= 1916 Nobel Prize in Literature =

- Verner von Heidenstam
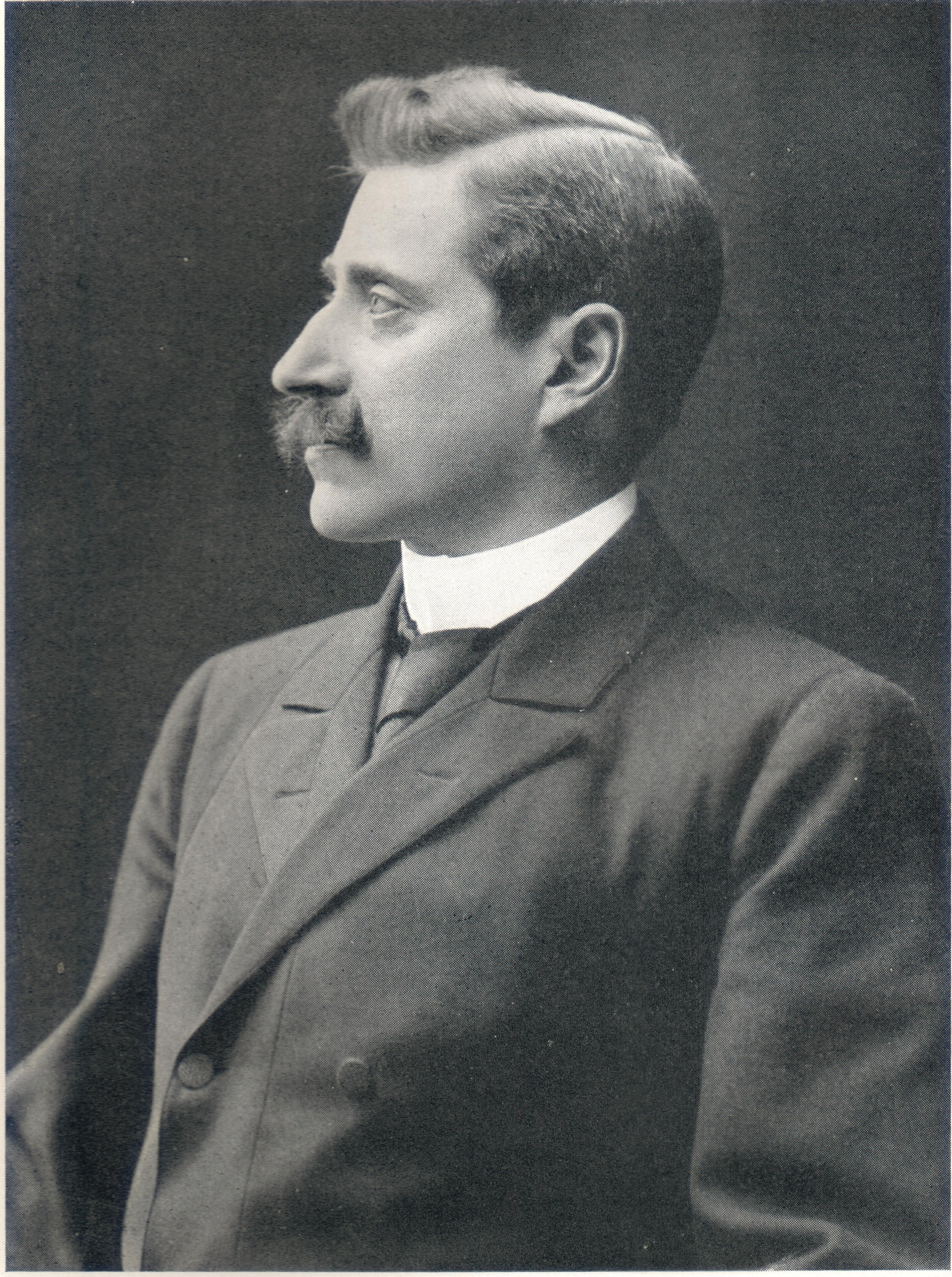
- "in recognition of his significance as the leading representative of a new era in our literature."
- Date: 9 November 1916 (Note: The Swedish Academy decided on 9 November 1916 that the 1915 Nobel Prize in Literature should be awarded to Romain Rolland and that this year's Nobel Prize in Literature should be awarded to Verner von Heidenstam.) (announcement); 10 December 1916 (ceremony)
- Location: Stockholm, Sweden
- Presented by: Swedish Academy
- First award: 1901
- Website: Official website

The 1916 Nobel Prize in Literature was awarded to the Swedish poet and prose writer Verner von Heidenstam (1859–1940) "in recognition of his significance as the leading representative of a new era in our literature." Heidenstam was the second Swedish Nobel laureate in Literature after Selma Lagerlöf in 1909.

== Laureate ==
Verner von Heidenstam was the leader of the generation of poets of the 1890s that regenerated Swedish poetry. His first collection of poems Vallfart och vandringsår ("Pilgrimage: The Wander Years", 1888), which contains predominantly Oriental themes, marked a new epoch in the modern literature of Sweden. A new form of poetry characterized by rich imagination and the worship of beauty in contrast to the gloomy realistic school which had been dominant in Swedish literature before. In major works such as Hans Alienus (1892) and especially in Dikter ("Poems", 1895) Heidenstam opens perspectives to an inner life.

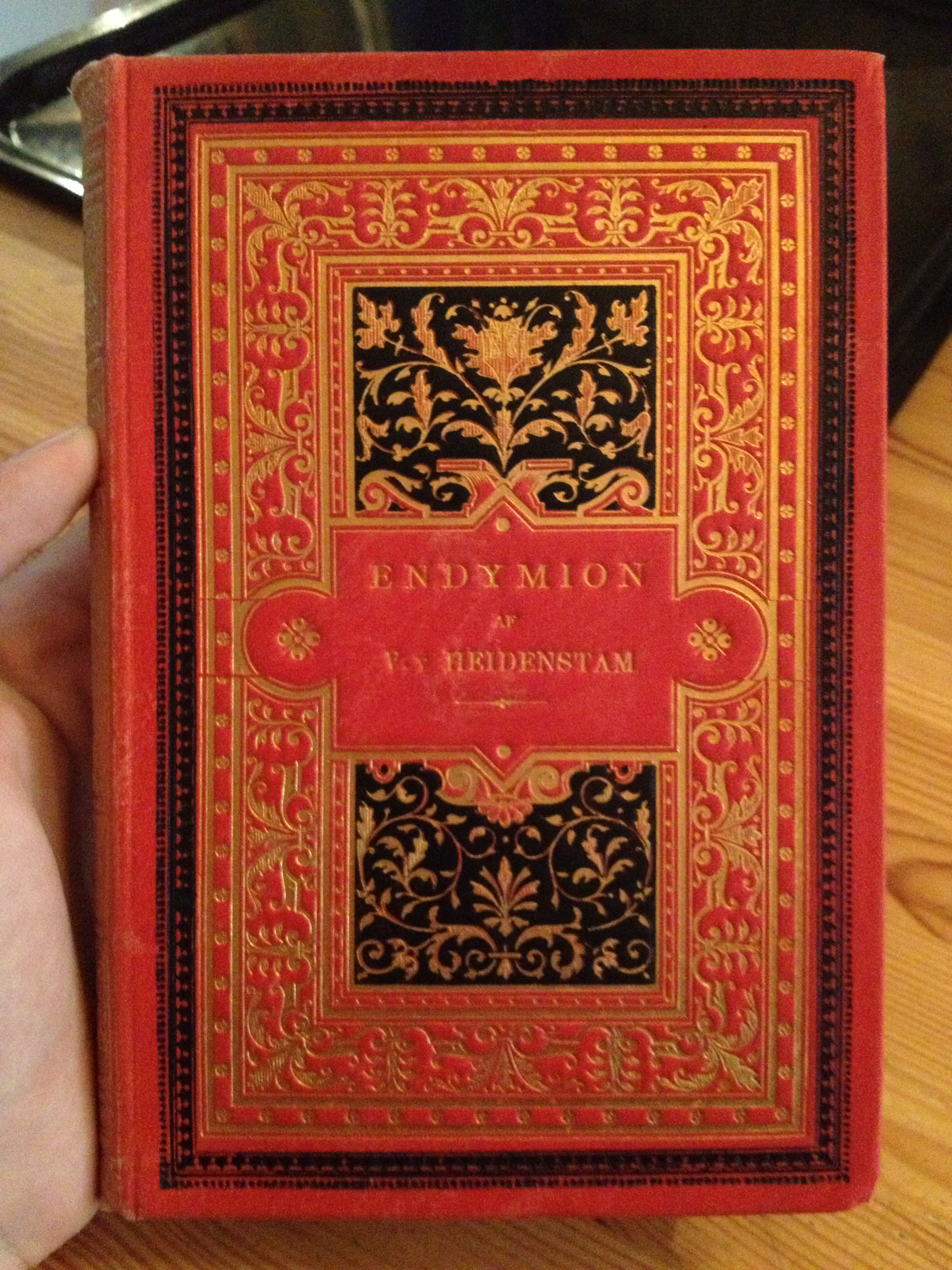
Verner von Heidenstam's first novel Endymion, first edition, 1889.

He was later noted for patriotic poetry linked to Swedish history in works such as Ett folk ("One People", 1902) and the prose poems in Karolinerna ("The Charles Men", 1897–98). These were followed by major works such as the epic historical prose work Folkunga Trädet ("The Tree of the Folkungs", 1905–07) including Folke Filbyter and Bjälboarvet ("The Bjälbo Inheritance"). In 1915, the year before Heidenstam was awarded the Nobel Prize in Literature, another aspect of his writing appeared in Nya dikter ("New poems"), a collection of mainly philosophical poems.

== Deliberations ==
=== Nominations ===
In 1916, the Nobel committee received 41 nominations for 24 writers including Romain Rolland (who was awarded the postponed prize for 1915), Georg Brandes, Henry James, Anatole France (awarded in 1921), and a proposed shared prize to the Swiss authors Adolf Frey and Carl Spitteler. The Nobel committee decided to add another five previously proposed authors as candidates for the 1916 prize: Benito Pérez Galdos, Juhani Aho, Adolf Harnack, Émile Verhaeren, Ernst von der Recke, and a single nomination for Carl Spitteler. One literary society was also nominated.

Verner von Heidenstam received his first nomination in 1909 from a Swedish politician and academic, Carl Carlson Bonde. Since then, he was nominated on 11 occasions before eventually being awarded in 1916 with which he received six nominations, including one nomination by the 1912 Nobel prize laureate Gerhard Hauptmann.

Nine of the nominees were nominated first-time, among them Erik Axel Karlfeldt (awarded posthumously in 1931), Per Hallström, Ivan Franko and Gunnar Heiberg. The Pāli Text Society, a text publication society established in 1881, was nominated by its founder Thomas William Rhys Davids. Since 1916, it remains the first and last literary society nominated for the Nobel Prize in Literature. The controversial German author Elisabeth Förster-Nietzsche was the only woman nominated. Karlfeldt was nominated by the Swedish bishop Nathan Söderblom.

The authors Sholom Aleichem, Rubén Darío, Richard Harding Davis, Mário de Sá-Carneiro, Jane Dieulafoy, Pierre Duhem, Carolina Freyre, Simon Frug, Olindo Guerrini, Petar Kočić, Jack London, João Simões Lopes Neto, Ernst Mach, Hector Hugh Munro (known as Saki), James Whitcomb Riley, Josiah Royce, Charles Taze Russell, Natsume Sōseki, Modest Ilyich Tchaikovsky, John Todhunter, Petko Todorov, and Francis Warre-Cornish died in 1916 without having been nominated for the prize.

Official list of nominees and their nominators for the prize
No.	Nominee	Country	Genre(s)	Nominator(s)
1	Juhani Aho (1861–1921)	Russia (Finland)	novel, short story	Karl Alfred Melin (1849–1919)
2	Georg Brandes (1842–1927)	Denmark	literary criticism, essays	Vilhelm Andersen (1864–1953)
3	Otokar Březina (1868–1929)	Austria-Hungary (Czechoslovakia)	poetry, essays	Arne Novák (1880–1939)
4	Rabindranath Datta (1883–1917)	India	poetry, pedagogy	Raya Yatindra Chondhury (–); Mano Gangedy (–)
5	Elisabeth Förster-Nietzsche (1846–1935)	Germany	essays, autobiography	Hans Vaihinger (1852–1933); Harald Hjärne (1848–1922)
6	Anatole France (1844–1924)	France	poetry, essays, drama, novel, literary criticism	Henrik Schück (1855–1947); Anton Wilhelm Brøgger (1884–1951)
7	Ivan Franko (1856–1916)	Russia (Ukraine)	poetry, novel, short story, drama, literary criticism, essays	Josef Zastyretz (1873–1943); Harald Hjärne (1848–1922)
8	Adolf Frey (1855–1920)	Switzerland	biography, history, essays	Wilhelm Oechsli (1851–1919)
9	Arne Garborg (1851–1921)	Norway	novel, poetry, drama, essays	Alexander Seippel (1851–1938); Oluf Kolsrud (1885–1945)
10	Karl Adolph Gjellerup (1857–1919)	Denmark	poetry, drama, novel	Claudius Wilkens (18844–1929); Harald Høffding (1843–1931)
11	Ángel Guimerá Jorge (1845–1924)	Spain	drama, poetry	Fredrik Wulff (1845–1930); members of the Real Academia Sevillana de Buenas Letras
12	Per Hallström (1866–1960)	Sweden	short story, drama, poetry	Karl Helm (1871–1960); Josef Collin (1864–1939); Conrad Borchling (1872–1946); Oskar Walzel (1864–1944); Andreas Heusler (1865–1940)
13	Gunnar Heiberg (1857–1929)	Norway	poetry, drama, literary criticism, essays	Jens Thiis (1870–1942)
14	Harald Høffding (1843–1931)	Denmark	philosophy, theology	Valdemar Vedel (1865–1942)
15	Henry James (1843–1916)	United States; Great Britain	novel, short story, drama, essays	Julio Nathaniel Reuter (1863–1937)
16	Erik Axel Karlfeldt (1864–1931)	Sweden	poetry	Nathan Söderblom (1866–1931)
17	Jakob Knudsen (1858–1917)	Denmark	novel, short story, pedagogy, theology	Valdemar Vedel (1865–1942)
18	Troels Frederik Lund (1840–1921)	Denmark	history	Frits Läffler (1847–1921)
19	Benito Pérez Galdós (1843–1920)	Spain	novel, short story, drama, essays	Harald Hjärne (1848–1922); Karl Alfred Melin (1849–1919)
20	Edmond Picard (1836–1924)	Belgium	drama, law, essays	3 members of the Royal Academy of Belgium
21	Henrik Pontoppidan (1857–1943)	Denmark	novel, short story	Otto Jespersen (1860–1943)
22	Romain Rolland (1866–1944)	France	novel, drama, essays	Fredrik Wulff (1845–1930); Erik Axel Karlfeldt (1864–1931); Henrik Schück (1855–1947)
23	Henrik Schück (1855–1947)	Sweden	literary criticism, essays	Rabbe Axel Wrede (1851–1938)
24	Carl Spitteler (1845–1924)	Switzerland	poetry, essays	Erik Axel Karlfeldt (1864–1931); Karl Alfred Melin (1849–1919); Wilhelm Oechsli (1851–1919)
25	Émile Verhaeren (1855–1916)	Belgium	poetry, essays	unnamed
26	Ernst von der Recke (1848–1933)	Denmark	poetry, drama	Karl Alfred Melin (1849–1919)
27	Adolf von Harnack (1851–1930)	Germany	history, theology	Karl Alfred Melin (1849–1919)
28	Verner von Heidenstam (1859–1940)	Sweden	novel, short story, poetry	Ruben G:son Berg (1876–1948); Fredrik Wulff (1845–1930); Jens Thiis (1870–1942); Bengt Hesselman (1875–1952); Gerhard Gran (1856–1925); Gerhart Hauptmann (1862–1946)
29	The Pāli Text Society (founded in 1881)	Great Britain	translation, history, publications	Thomas William Rhys Davids (1843–1922)

=== Prize decision ===
In his report to the Swedish Academy dated 21 September 1916, Nobel committee chairman Harald Hjärne, in reference to the ongoing World War I conflict, noted that "It must certainly be considered regrettable that so many of them [nominated candidates], like other prominent writers and scientists in almost all of Europe, have allowed themselves to make numerous passionate statements that make it difficult to achieve the Nobel Foundation's purpose of working for peace and harmony among peoples."

Hjärne proposed that the postponed prize for 1915 should be awarded to the Spanish novelist Benito Pérez Galdós. Hjärne noted Pérez Galdós major work Episodios Nacionales and said: "It seems to me obvious that he has made more and more efforts to set aside his own and his fellow-thinkers' special interests and prejudices in the pursuit of his great plan in comparison with the need of the entire Spanish people for mutual reconciliation and cohesion. There is certainly a tendency in this, but one which cannot be called unjustified even from an aesthetic point of view, since he does not seek to achieve his aim by argumentation and declamations in his own name, but uses only purely artistic means. It is Spain itself, the common fatherland, which emerges as the great controlling and self-developing personality over the countless people of different classes and conditions, characters and gifts, whose actions, intrigues and destinies are reflected against the background of the incessant civil wars, and it is Spain's own voice that is heard in the statements of the changing narrators and observers, from one generation to the next, of what is happening before their eyes or preserved in their memory."

For the 1916 prize, Hjärne mentioned several authors from the neutral country Denmark as candidates for the prize, with Karl Gjellerup as his first proposal, arguing that "In versatile and profound learning he probably stands high above his Danish competitors, and he has won a great reputation both in England and in Germany as one of the foremost men of contemporary literature." Hjärne also found the Danish writer Jakob Knudsen a worthy candidate for the prize: "Overall, his writing should be considered to be of such prominence that he may well be remembered when the Nobel Prize is awarded", while Henrik Pontoppidan (who subsequently shared the 1917 prize with Gjellerup) was dismissed: "His writing, which is increasingly limited to subtle depictions of uninteresting personalities and situations, seems to me, with its characteristic of tired indifference, its circumstantial and almost dry style of presentation, to lack the open-mindedness that could justify a Nobel Prize." Literary critic Georg Brandes was noted for his "groundbreaking significance", but his works had to Hjärne appeared to have lost some of its relevance.

Hjärne proposed that the postponed prize for 1915 should be awarded to Benito Pérez Galdós and the prize for 1916 to Karl Gjellerup. The members of the Swedish Academy did not follow Hjärnes recommendations, but voted on 9 November 1916 that the prize for 1915 should be awarded to the French author Romain Rolland, and the prize for 1916 to Verner von Heidenstam.

== Reactions ==
The decision to award Heidenstam, himself a member of the awarding institution the Swedish Academy, as the second Swedish Nobel laureate in just seven years provoked mixed reactions. The Swedish press was generally positive to the choice of Heidenstam, but internationally it was heavily criticized by many observers. The decision to award Heidenstam has been seen as a result of the strong tendency of nationalism in Sweden at the time.
