= 1917 Nobel Prize in Literature =

- Karl Adolph Gjellerup and Henrik Pontoppidan
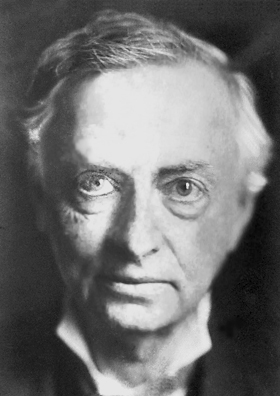
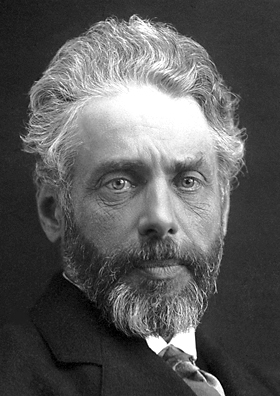
- Gjellerup "for his varied and rich poetry, which is inspired by lofty ideals," and Pontoppidan "for his authentic descriptions of present-day life in Denmark."
- Date: 8 November 1917 (announcement); 10 December 1917 (ceremony)
- Location: Stockholm, Sweden
- Presented by: Swedish Academy
- First award: 1901
- Website: Official website

The 1917 Nobel Prize in Literature was equally divided between the Danish authors Karl Adolph Gjellerup (1857–1919) "for his varied and rich poetry, which is inspired by lofty ideals," and Henrik Pontoppidan (1857–1943) "for his authentic descriptions of present-day life in Denmark." It is the second of four occasions when the Nobel Prize in Literature has been shared between two individuals.

== Laureates ==
=== Karl Adolph Gjellerup ===
The son of a parson, Gjellerup studied theology, but after coming under the influence of Darwinism and the ideas of fellow countryman Georg Brandes, he thought of himself as an atheist. Later in life, he turned to religion once more and discovered inspiration for his writing in Buddhism. Gjellerup moved to Dresden in 1923. The subject of Karl Gjellerup's debut book, En idealist shildring af Epigonus ("An Idealist, A Description of Epigonus", 1878), was his personal conversion to atheism. In Minna (1889) and Der Pilger Kamanita ("The Pilgrim Kamanita", 1906), an exotic tale of reincarnation set in India, he displays his interest in Buddhism. Up until around 1900, Gjellerup wrote in Danish. Then, he switched to write exclusively in German, which he believed helped him grow as an artist. Das heiligste Tier ("The Holiest Animal", 1919) was his last work.

=== Henrik Pontoppidan ===
Like Gjellerup, Pontoppidan himself is also a son of a clergyman. He partly revolted against his religious environment by studying engineering in Copenhagen in 1873. Becoming a primary school teacher for a short time, he started writing full-time and became a freelance journalist, making his debut in 1881. Most facets of Danish life are covered in his novels and short stories. He wrote his three main works between 1890 and 1920: Det forjættede Land ("The Promised Land", 1891–95), Lykke-Per ("Lucky Per", 1898–1904) – the partially autobiographical story of a self-assured, extraordinarily bright guy, who defies his religious family to become an engineer, free of heritage and cultural context, and De dødes Rige ("The Realm of the Dead", 1912–16). He depicts Denmark in these works during the time of the constitutional conflict between conservatives and liberals, the growth of industrialization, and the emergence of revolutionary groups.

== Deliberations ==
=== Nominations ===
In total, the Nobel Committee of the Swedish Academy received 26 nominations for 20 writers such as William Chapman, Arne Garborg, Carl Spitteler (awarded in 1919), Georg Brandes, Juhani Aho, and Àngel Guimerà. Most of the nominees were Scandinavian and six were newly nominated: Ivan Vazov, Otto Ernst, Jeppe Aakjær, Johan Bojer, and Bertel Gripenberg. Two female authors were nominated, the controversial Elisabeth Förster-Nietzsche and the Italian writer Grazia Deledda (awarded in 1926). The Swedish Academy's permanent secretary Erik Axel Karlfeldt received two nominations.

The authors Joseph Ashby-Sterry, Maksim Bahdanovič, Jane Barlow, Edmund Bishop, Léon Bloy, Oscar Blumenthal, Franz Brentano, Francis Cowley Burnand, William De Morgan, Mathilde-Marie de Peyrebrune, George Diamandy, Joaquín Dicenta, Émile Durkheim, António Feijó, Judith Gautier, Paul Hervieu, Agnes Leonard Hill, Emma Lili'uokalani, Katharine Sarah Macquoid, Titu Maiorescu, Octave Mirbeau, James Hope Moulton, Andrew Murray, José Enrique Rodó, and Mendele Mocher Sforim died without in 1917 without having been nominated for the prize.

Official list of nominees and their nominators for the prize
No.	Nominee	Country	Genre(s)	Nominator(s)
1	Jeppe Aakjær (1866–1930)	Denmark	novel, short story, drama, poetry, essays, autobiography	Christen Collin (1857–1926)
2	Juhani Aho (1861–1921)	Russia (Finland)	novel, short story	Erik Axel Karlfeldt (1864–1931)
3	Johan Bojer (1872–1959)	Norway	novel, drama	Christen Collin (1857–1926)
4	Georg Brandes (1842–1927)	Denmark	literary criticism, essays	Werner Söderhjelm (1859–1931); Karl Warburg (1852–1918); Henrik Schück (1855–1947)
5	Otokar Březina (1868–1929)	Austria-Hungary (Czechoslovakia)	poetry, essays	Arne Novák (1880–1939)
6	Olaf Bull (1883–1933)	Norway	poetry	Christen Collin (1857–1926)
7	William Chapman (1850–1917)	Canada	poetry, translation	rectors of the universities in Ottawa and Montreal
8	Grazia Deledda (1871–1936)	Italy	novel, short story, essays	Luigi Luzzatti (1841–1927); Carl Bildt (1850–1931)
9	Elisabeth Förster-Nietzsche (1846–1935)	Germany	essays, autobiography	Hans Vaihinger (1852–1933)
10	Adolf Frey (1855–1920)	Switzerland	biography, history, essays	Wilhelm Oechsli (1851–1919)
11	Arne Garborg (1851–1921)	Norway	novel, poetry, drama, essays	Oluf Kolsrud (1885–1945)
12	Karl Adolph Gjellerup (1857–1919)	Denmark	poetry, drama, novel	Ludwig Schemann (1852–1938); Several professors in Germany; Claudius Wilkens (1844–1929); Vilhelm Andersen (1864–1953)
13	Bertel Gripenberg (1878–1947)	Russia (Finland); Sweden	poetry, drama, essays	Harald Hjärne (1848–1922)
14	Ángel Guimerá Jorge (1845–1924)	Spain	drama, poetry	Fredrik Wulff (1845–1930); members of the Real Academia Sevillana de Buenas Letras
15	Erik Axel Karlfeldt (1864–1931)	Sweden	poetry	Ruben G:son Berg (1876–1948); Frits Läffler (1847–1921)
16	Edmond Picard (1836–1924)	Belgium	drama, law, essays	Adolphe Prins (1845–1919); Ernest Nys (1851–1920)
17	Henrik Pontoppidan (1857–1943)	Denmark	novel, short story	Adolf Noreen (1854–1925); Vilhelm Andersen (1864–1953)
18	Otto Ernst Schmidt (1862–1926)	Germany	poetry, drama, essays	Per Hallström (1866–1960)
19	Carl Spitteler (1845–1924)	Switzerland	poetry, essays	Verner von Heidenstam (1859–1940); Wilhelm Oechsli (1851–1919)
20	Ivan Vazov (1850–1921)	Bulgaria	novel, poetry, drama, essays	Ivan Shishmanov (1862–1928)

=== Prize decision ===
In 1916, a shared prize between the Danish authors Jakob Knudsen and Karl Gjellerup had been considered by the Nobel committee but was rejected by the Academy in favour of the Swedish author Verner von Heidenstam. With the death of Knudsen in January 1917, he was replaced by Pontoppidan as the committee paired him with Gjellerup for the 1917 prize.

== Reactions ==
The prize to Gjellerup and Pontoppidan was heavily criticised. In Denmark, the award to Gjellerup was particularly criticised as he was not writing in Danish but in German.
