= 1913 Nobel Prize in Literature =

- Rabindranath Tagore
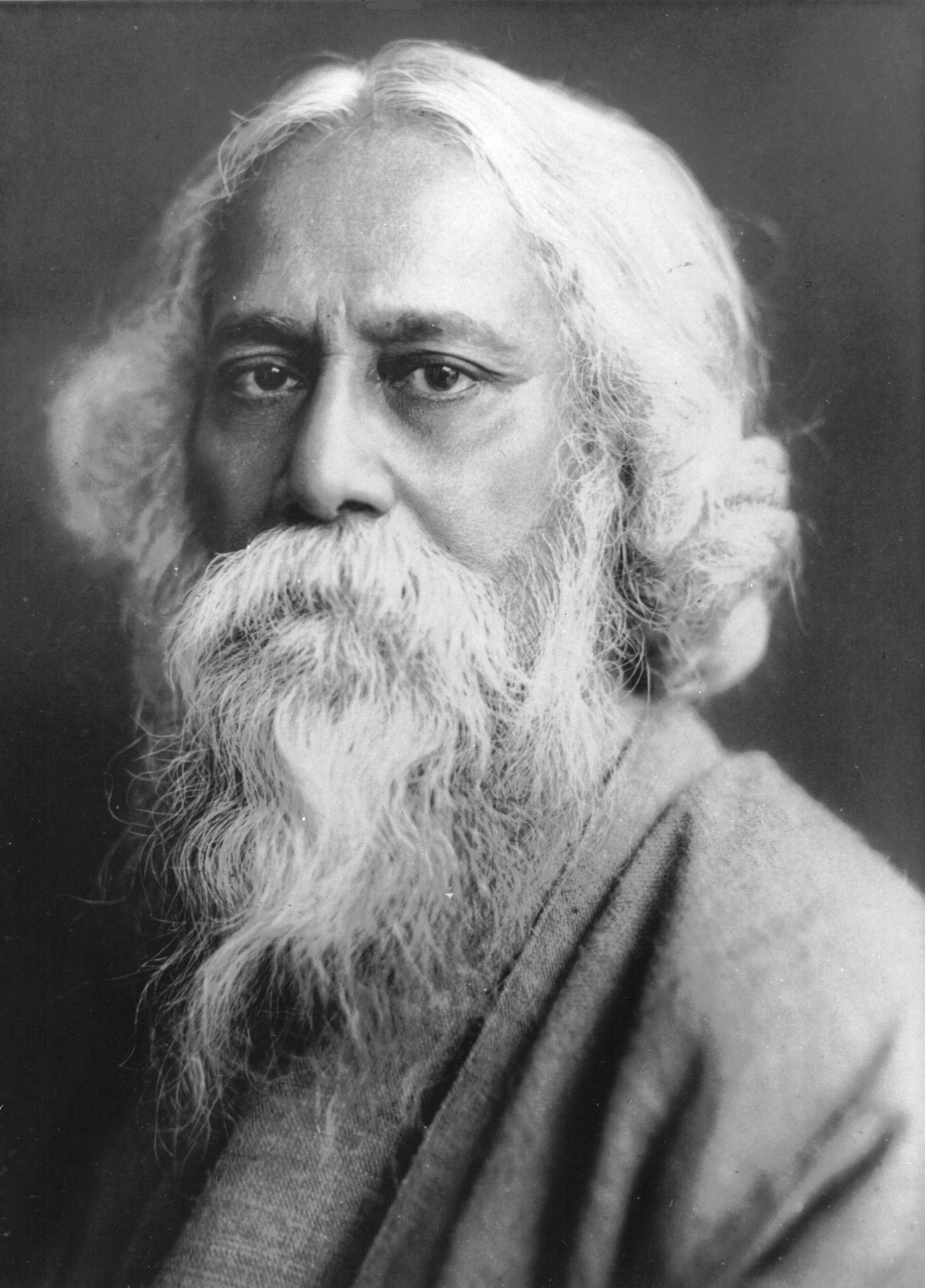
- "because of his profoundly sensitive, fresh and beautiful verse, by which, with consummate skill, he has made his poetic thought, expressed in his own English words, a part of the literature of the West."
- Date: 13 November 1913 (announcement); 10 December 1913 (ceremony)
- Location: Stockholm, Sweden
- Presented by: Swedish Academy
- First award: 1901
- Website: Official website

The 1913 Nobel Prize in Literature was awarded to the Bengali polymath Rabindranath Tagore (1861–1941) "because of his profoundly sensitive, fresh and beautiful verse, by which, with consummate skill, he has made his poetic thought, expressed in his own English words, a part of the literature of the West." He is the first and remains the only Indian recipient of the prize. The award stemmed from the idealistic and accessible (for Western readers) nature of a small body of translated material, including the translated Gitanjali.

== Laureate ==
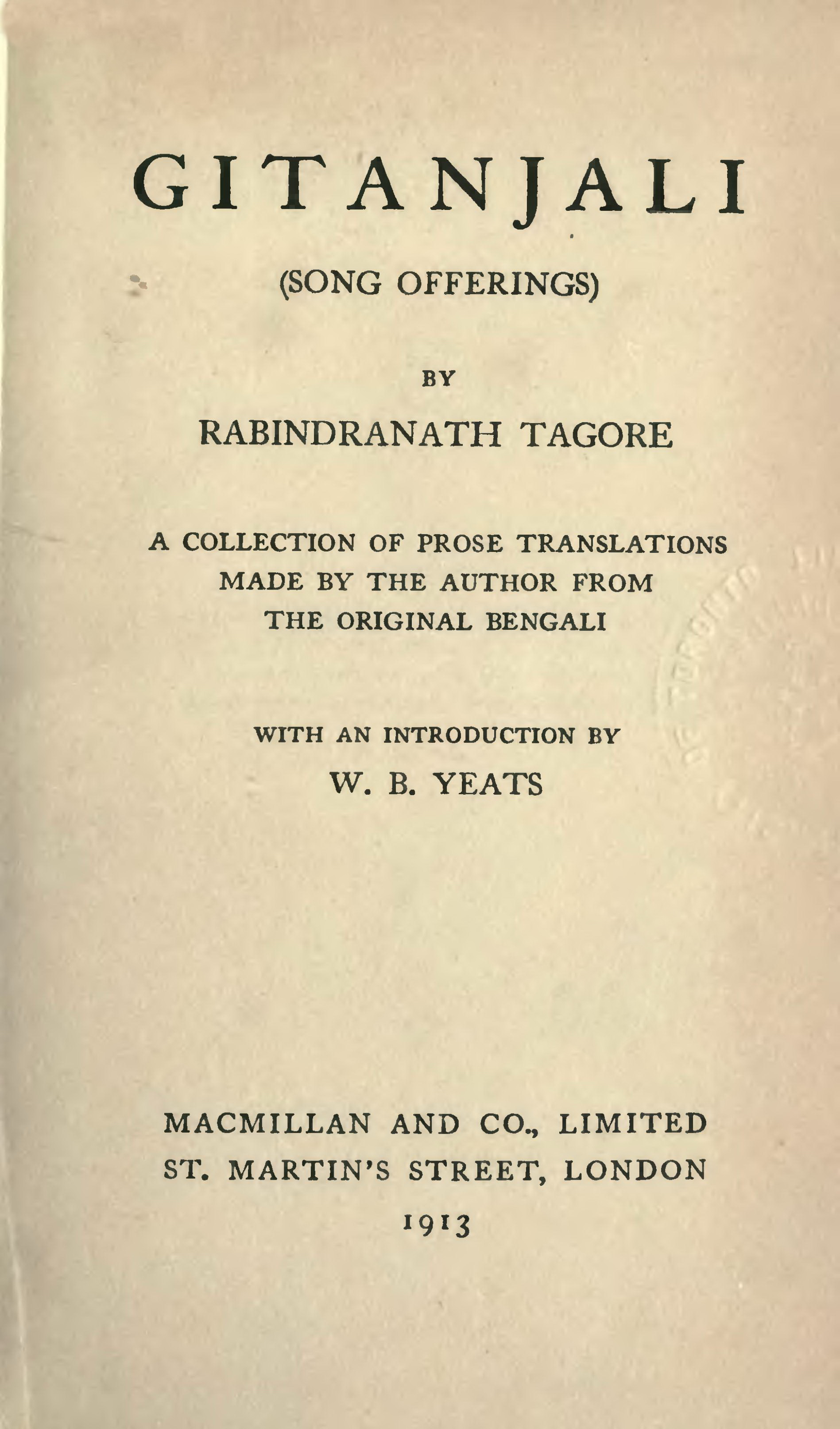
Title page of Rabindranath Tagore's Gitanjali (Macmillan, 1913)

The literary works of Rabindranath Tagore are well established in both Indian and Western academic traditions. In addition to fiction in the form of poetry, songs, stories, and dramas, it also incorporates literary criticism, philosophy, and social issues. After translating his poems into English, Tagore, who initially wrote in Bengali, was able to appeal to a large audience in the West. His poetry was believed to portray the tranquility of the spirit in connection with nature, in contrast to the frenzied existence in the West. His works include Gitanjali ("Song Offerings", 1910), Gora ("Fair-Faced", 1910) and Ghare-Baire ("The Home and the World", 1916).

== Deliberations ==
=== Nominations ===
Rabindranath Tagore had not been nominated for the prize before 1913, making it one of the rare occasions when an author have been awarded the Nobel Prize in Literature the same year they were first nominated. He was nominated by British poet Thomas Sturge Moore (1870–1944), which led him to being awarded with the prize.

In total, the Swedish Academy received 32 nominations for 28 writers. Among the repeated nominees include Pierre Loti, Verner von Heidenstam (awarded in 1916), Sven Hedin, Ángel Guimerá, Anatole France (awarded in 1921), John Morley, and Thomas Hardy. Nine of the nominees were newly nominated such as Edmond Picard, Jakob Knudsen, Henrik Pontoppidan (awarded in 1917), Émile Faguet, Edward Dowden, and John Lubbock, 1st Baron Avebury. The Italian writer Grazia Deledda, who was awarded in 1927 for the 1926 prize, was the only female nominee.

The authors Alfred Austin, Aluísio Azevedo, Eva Brag, Jules Claretie, Ferdinand de Saussure, Ferdinand Dugué, Louis Hémon, Friedrich Huch, Ștefan Octavian Iosif, Pauline Johnson, Ioan Kalinderu, Thomas Krag, Emily Lawless, Camille Lemonnier, Juhan Liiv, Charles Major, Oscar Méténier, Lesya Ukrainka, Alfred Russel Wallace, and Frances Julia Wedgwood died in 1913 without having been nominated for the prize. The Irish critic Edward Dowden and English polymath John Lubbock, 1st Baron Avebury died months before the announcement.

Official list of nominees and their nominators for the prize
No.	Nominee	Country	Genre(s)	Nominator(s)
1	Juhani Aho (1861–1921)	Russia (Finland)	novel, short story	Karl Alfred Melin (1849–1919)
2	Henri Bergson (1859–1941)	France	philosophy	Vitalis Norström (1856–1916)
3	Grazia Deledda (1871–1936)	Italy	novel, short story, essays	Ferdinando Martini (1840–1928); Luigi Luzzatti (1841–1927)
4	Edward Dowden (1843–1913)	Ireland	poetry, essays, literary criticism	James Lindsay, 26th Earl of Crawford (1847–1913)
5	Émile Faguet (1847–1916)	France	literary criticism, essays	Émile Boutroux (1845–1921)
6	Salvatore Farina (1846–1918)	Italy	novel, short story	members of the Istituto Lombardo Accademia di Scienze e Lettere
7	Anatole France (1844–1924)	France	poetry, essays, drama, novel, literary criticism	Richard Moritz Meyer (1860–1914)
8	Adolf Frey (1855–1920)	Switzerland	biography, history, essays	Wilhelm Oechsli (1851–1919)
9	Karl Adolph Gjellerup (1857–1919)	Denmark	poetry, drama, novel	several German professors; members of the Royal Danish Academy of Sciences and Letters
10	Ángel Guimerá Jorge (1845–1924)	Spain	drama, poetry	members of the Reial Acadèmia de Bones Lletres de Barcelona
11	Thomas Hardy (1840–1928)	Great Britain	novel, short story, poetry	97 members of the Royal Society of Literature
12	Sven Hedin (1865–1952)	Sweden	essays, autobiography, history	Fredrik Wulff (1845–1930)
13	Harald Høffding (1843–1931)	Denmark	philosophy, theology	members of the Royal Danish Academy of Sciences and Letters
14	Jakob Knudsen (1858–1917)	Denmark	novel, short story, pedagogy, theology	Per Hallström (1866–1960)
15	Ernest Lavisse (1842–1922)	France	history	Hans Hildebrand (1842–1913); Frédéric Masson (1847–1923); Raymond Poincaré (1860–1934); Paul Hervieu (1857–1915); Marcel Prévost (1862–1941)
16	Pierre Loti (1850–1923)	France	novel, short story, autobiography, essays	Ernest Lavisse (1842–1922); Gabriel Hanotaux (1853–1944)
17	John Lubbock (1834–1913)	Great Britain	essays	Hans Hildebrand (1842–1913)
18	John Morley (1838–1923)	Great Britain	biography, literary criticism, essays	John Lubbock, 1st Baron Avebury (1834–1913)
19	Benito Pérez Galdós (1843–1920)	Spain	novel, short story, drama, essays	members of the Royal Spanish Academy and several literary societies
20	Edmond Picard (1836–1924)	Belgium	drama, law, essays	Maurice Maeterlinck (1862–1949)
21	Henrik Pontoppidan (1857–1943)	Denmark	novel, short story	Adolf Noreen (1854–1925)
22	Peter Rosegger (1843–1918)	Austria-Hungary	poetry, essays	Karl Alfred Melin (1849–1919)
23	Salvador Rueda Santos (1857–1933)	Spain	poetry, essays	professors in Madrid
24	Rabindranath Tagore (1861–1941)	India	poetry, novel, drama, short story, essay, songwriting, translation	Thomas Sturge Moore (1870–1944)
25	Carl Spitteler (1845–1924)	Switzerland	poetry, essays	49 members of The Nobel Prize Committee of the Society of Authors; Wilhelm Oechsli (1851–1919)
26	Ernst von der Recke (1848–1933)	Denmark	poetry, drama	members of the Royal Danish Academy of Sciences and Letters
27	Verner von Heidenstam (1859–1940)	Sweden	novel, short story, poetry	Fredrik Wulff (1845–1930)
28	Francis Channing Welles (1887–1956)	Great Britain	essays	Carveth Read (1848–1931)

=== Prize decision ===
Considered for the 1913 prize included Thomas Hardy, Anatole France and Rabindranath Tagore. The candidacy of Hardy, nominated by 97 members of the Royal Society of Literature, were dismissed by the committee on the grounds that his writing were considered too "pessimistic" to be in line with the Nobel prize donor Alfred Nobel's will. Similarly, France was considered a "sceptic", although he was eventually awarded the prize several years later. In their report to the Swedish Academy, the committee recommended two other French writers as worthy of the prize, historian Ernest Lavisse and, in particular, literary critic and author Émile Fauget. Academy member Verner von Heidenstam however argued that the Academy should primarily award fiction writers and successfully advocated that Tagore should be awarded.

Poems of the newly nominated Tagore read in English translation was described by the Nobel committee as "a surprise of a peculiar kind". Committee member Per Hallström declared in a report that "...no poet in Europe since the death of Goethe in 1832 can rival Tagore....". To the poet Verner von Heidenstam, himself awarded in 1916, Tagore was the "discovering [of] a great name".

On 13 November 1913 the Swedish Academy decided that that year's Nobel Prize in Literature should be awarded to Rabindranath Tagore "because of his profoundly sensitive, fresh and beautiful verse, by which, with consummate skill, he has made his poetic thought, expressed in his own English words, a part of the literature of the West."

== Reactions ==
The choice of Rabindranath Tagore received intense reactions and substantial coverage in newspapers around the world.

In Stockholm, a correspondent for the London newspaper The Times reported that the general reaction were of both surprise and joy: "The newspapers this morning express some surprise at the unexpected decision by the Swedish Academy to confer the Nobel Prize for Literature on the Indian poet Rabindranath Tagore. The choice, however, is hailed as a very happy one, and extracts are quoted from the English translation of the poet's work Gitanjali.

The choice of Tagore was substantially recognised in The New York Times with several articles describing the previously "Entirely unknown outside of his own country" poet's quick rise to international fame and comparing him to Walt Whitman.

The French newspaper Le Figaro said it was an surprise choice of "an author without - until now - any significant world reputation but with a central position in his Bengali home country." The British Daily Mail expressed a delighted reaction to the prize decision.

== Other Nobel-related events ==
=== Theft of Nobel Prize ===
Tagore's Nobel Prize and a number of his other possessions were stolen from the Visva-Bharati University's security vault on March 25, 2004. The Swedish Academy decided to give the University two copies of Tagore's Nobel Prize, one made of gold and the other of bronze, on December 7, 2004. It inspired the fictional film Nobel Chor. A baul singer named Pradip Bauri was detained in 2016 after being suspected of providing the robbers with cover. The reward was then given back.
