= 1914 Nobel Prize in Literature =

- Date: 3 November 1914 (Note: By Royal Decree of 3rd November 1914, the decision of the Swedish Academy regarding the 1914 Nobel Prize in Literature was postponed until the following year.) (postponement)
- First award: 1901
- Website: Official website

The 1914 Nobel Prize in Literature was not awarded when the committee's deliberations were upset by the beginning of World War I (1914–1918). Thus, the prize money was allocated to the Special Fund of this prize section. This was the first occasion in Nobel history that the prize was not conferred.

== Nominations ==
The Nobel Committee of the Swedish Academy received received 26 nominations for 24 writers.

Seven of the nominees were nominated first-time including Willem Kloos, Dmitry Merezhkovsky, Antonio Serra Morant, Vilhelm Grønbech, René Bazin, and Josef Svatopluk Machar. The highest number of nominations – two nominations each – were for Harald Høffding, Ángel Guimerá Jorge, and Carl Spitteler (awarded in 1919). Two Italian female writers were nominated Dora Melegari and Grazia Deledda (awarded in 1926).

The authors Delmira Agustini, Dimitrie Anghel, Jakub Arbes, Robert Hugh Benson, Robert Jones Burdette, Nikolai Chayev, Mariana Cox Méndez, Alessandro d'Ancona, Danske Dandridge, Mircea Demetriade, Augusto dos Anjos, Edith Maude Eaton, Henri-Alban Fournier (known as Alain-Fournier), Jules Lemaître, Theodor Lipps, Isabella Fyvie Mayo, Christian Morgenstern, Charles Sanders Peirce, Charles Péguy, Bhaktivinoda Thakur, Brandon Thomas, Georg Trakl, Bertha von Suttner (who won the 1905 Nobel Peace Prize), Theodore Watts-Dunton, and Peyo Yavorov died in 1914 without having been nominated for the prize.

Official list of nominees and their nominators for the prize
No.	Nominee	Country	Genre(s)	Nominator(s)
1	Juhani Aho (1861–1921)	Russia (Finland)	novel, short story	Erik Axel Karlfeldt (1864–1931)
2	René Bazin (1853–1932)	France	novel	Pierre Loti (1850–1923)
3	Henri Bergson (1859–1941)	France	philosophy	Vitalis Norström (1856–1916)
4	Paul Bourget (1852–1935)	France	novel, short story, literary criticism, essays	René Bazin (1853–1932)
5	Grazia Deledda (1871–1936)	Italy	novel, short story, essays	Carl Bildt (1850–1931)
6	Jean-Henri Fabre (1823–1915)	France	short story, essays, poetry	Johan Vising (1855–1942)
7	Émile Faguet (1847–1916)	France	literary criticism, essays	Harald Hjärne (1848–1922)
8	Salvatore Farina (1846–1918)	Italy	novel, short story	members of the Istituto Lombardo Accademia di Scienze e Lettere
9	Adolf Frey (1855–1920)	Switzerland	biography, history, essays	Wilhelm Oechsli (1851–1919)
10	Karl Adolph Gjellerup (1857–1919)	Denmark	poetry, drama, novel	Harald Høffding (1843–1931); Several members of the Royal Danish Academy of Sciences and Letters
11	Vilhelm Grønbech (1873–1948)	Denmark	history, essays, poetry	Harald Hjärne (1848–1922)
12	Ángel Guimerá Jorge (1845–1924)	Spain	drama, poetry	Fredrik Wulff (1845–1930); members of the Real Academia Sevillana de Buenas Letras
13	Thomas Hardy (1840–1928)	Great Britain	novel, short story, poetry, drama	members of the Royal Society of Literature
14	Harald Høffding (1843–1931)	Denmark	philosophy, theology	Claudius Wilkens (1844–1929); Valdemar Vedel (1865–1942)
15	Willem Kloos (1859–1938)	Netherlands	poetry, essays, literary criticism	Maurice Maeterlinck (1862–1949); Several professors in Leiden and Groningen
16	Josef Svatopluk Machar (1864–1942)	Austria-Hungary (Czechoslovakia)	poetry, essays, novel	Arnošt Kraus (1859–1943); Several professors from Prague, Czechia
17	Dora Melegari (1849–1924)	Switzerland; Italy	novel, short story, essays, literary criticism	Louis Duchesne (1843–1922)
18	Dmitry Merezhkovsky (1865–1941)	Russia	novel, essays, poetry, drama	Nestor Kotlyarevsky (1863–1925)
19	Benito Pérez Galdós (1843–1920)	Spain	novel, short story, drama, essays	José Echegaray Eizaguirre (1832–1916); 2 members of the Royal Spanish Academy
20	Edmond Picard (1836–1924)	Belgium	drama, law, essays	Maurice Maeterlinck (1862–1949)
21	Antonio Serra Morant (1866–1939)	Spain	essays	Eloy Señán Alonso (1858–1923)
22	Carl Spitteler (1845–1924)	Switzerland	poetry, essays	49 members of The Nobel Prize Committee of the Society of Authors; Wilhelm Oechsli (1851–1919)
23	Ernst von der Recke (1848–1933)	Denmark	poetry, drama	11 professors from the Royal Danish Academy of Sciences and Letters
24	William Butler Yeats (1865–1939)	Ireland	poetry, drama, essays	George Noble Plunkett (1851–1948)

== Prize decision ==
In their report to the Swedish Academy dated 1 October 1914, the Nobel committee proposed that the 1914 Nobel Prize in Literature should be awarded to the Swiss author Carl Spitteler, but on 3 November 1914 the Swedish Academy decided that that year's prize should be postponed to the following year.

Carl Spitteler was subsequently awarded the 1919 Nobel Prize in Literature.
