= 1918 Nobel Prize in Literature =

- Date: 14 November 1918 (Note: The Swedish Academy decided on 14th November 1918 that this year's Nobel Prize in Literature would be reserved for the following year.) (postponement)
- First award: 1901
- Website: Official website

The 1918 Nobel Prize in Literature was withheld the second time since 1914 because the committee's deliberations were still disturbed by the ongoing First World War (1914–1918). The war ended on 11 November 1918, a month after the annual announcement ceremony. Thus, the prize money was allocated to the Special Fund of this prize section.

== Nominations ==
Despite the ongoing war, numerous literary circles and academics still sent nomination to the Nobel Committee of the Swedish Academy. In total, the academy received 19 nominations for 17 writers.

Five of the nominees were nominated first-time including Knut Hamsun (awarded in 1920), Gustav Frenssen, Alois Jirásek, Maxim Gorky, and Gunnar Gunnarsson. The highest number of nominations were for Finnish author Juhani Aho with 3 nominations. The Italian writer Grazia Deledda (awarded in 1926) was the only female writer nominated.

The authors Henry Brooks Adams, Guillaume Apollinaire, Hubert Howe Bancroft, Olavo Bilac, Neltje Blanchan, Arrigo Boito, Randolph Bourne, William Wilfred Campbell, Ivan Cankar, Hermann Cohen, George Coșbuc, Max Dauthendey, William Hope Hodgson, Margit Kaffka, Harald Kidde, Paul Margueritte, Peter Nansen, Wilfred Owen, Georgi Plekhanov, Dora Sigerson Shorter, Georg Simmel, Carlos Guido Spano, Richard Voss, Frank Wedekind, Julius Wellhausen, Andrew Dickson White, Fanny zu Reventlow, and Anna Radius Zuccari died in 1918 without having been nominated for the prize.

Official list of nominees and their nominators for the prize
No.	Nominee	Country	Genre(s)	Nominator(s)
1	Juhani Aho (1861–1921)	Finland	novel, short story	Yrjö Hirn (1870–1952); Finnish Literature Society; Finnish Society of Sciences and Letters
2	Henri Bergson (1859–1941)	France	philosophy	Verner von Heidenstam (1859–1940)
3	Georg Brandes (1842–1927)	Denmark	literary criticism, essays	Yrjö Hirn (1870–1952)
4	Otokar Březina (1868–1929)	Austria-Hungary (Czechoslovakia)	poetry, essays	Arne Novák (1880–1939)
5	Grazia Deledda (1871–1936)	Italy	novel, short story, essays	Carl Bildt (1850–1931); Ferdinando Martini (1840–1928)
6	Gustav Frenssen (1863–1945)	Germany	novel, drama	Bengt Hesselman (1875–1952)
7	Adolf Frey (1855–1920)	Switzerland	biography, history, essays	Wilhelm Oechsli (1851–1919)
8	Maxim Gorky (1868–1936)	Russia	novel, short story, drama, memoir, autobiography, essays, poetry	Bengt Hesselman (1875–1952)
9	Bertel Gripenberg (1878–1947)	Finland; Sweden	poetry, drama, essays	Harald Hjärne (1848–1922)
10	Ángel Guimerá Jorge (1845–1924)	Spain	drama, poetry	Fredrik Wulff (1845–1930)
11	Gunnar Gunnarsson (1889–1975)	Iceland	novel, short story, poetry	Adolf Noreen (1854–1925)
12	Knut Hamsun (1859–1952)	Norway	novel, short story, drama, poetry, essays	Harry Fett (1875–1962)
13	Alois Jirásek (1851–1930)	Austria-Hungary (Czechoslovakia)	novel, drama	Czech Academy of Sciences
14	Erik Axel Karlfeldt (1884–1931)	Sweden	poetry	Frits Läffler (1847–1921)
15	Peter Rosegger (1843–1918)	Austria-Hungary	poetry, essays	Karl Alfred Melin (1849–1919)
16	Carl Spitteler (1845–1924)	Switzerland	poetry, essays	Jonas Fränkel (1879–1965); Karl Alfred Melin (1849–1919); Wilhelm Oechsli (1851–1919)
17	William Butler Yeats (1865–1939)	Ireland	poetry, drama, essays	Per Hallström (1866–1960)
