= 1920 Nobel Prize in Literature =

Award

- Knut Hamsun
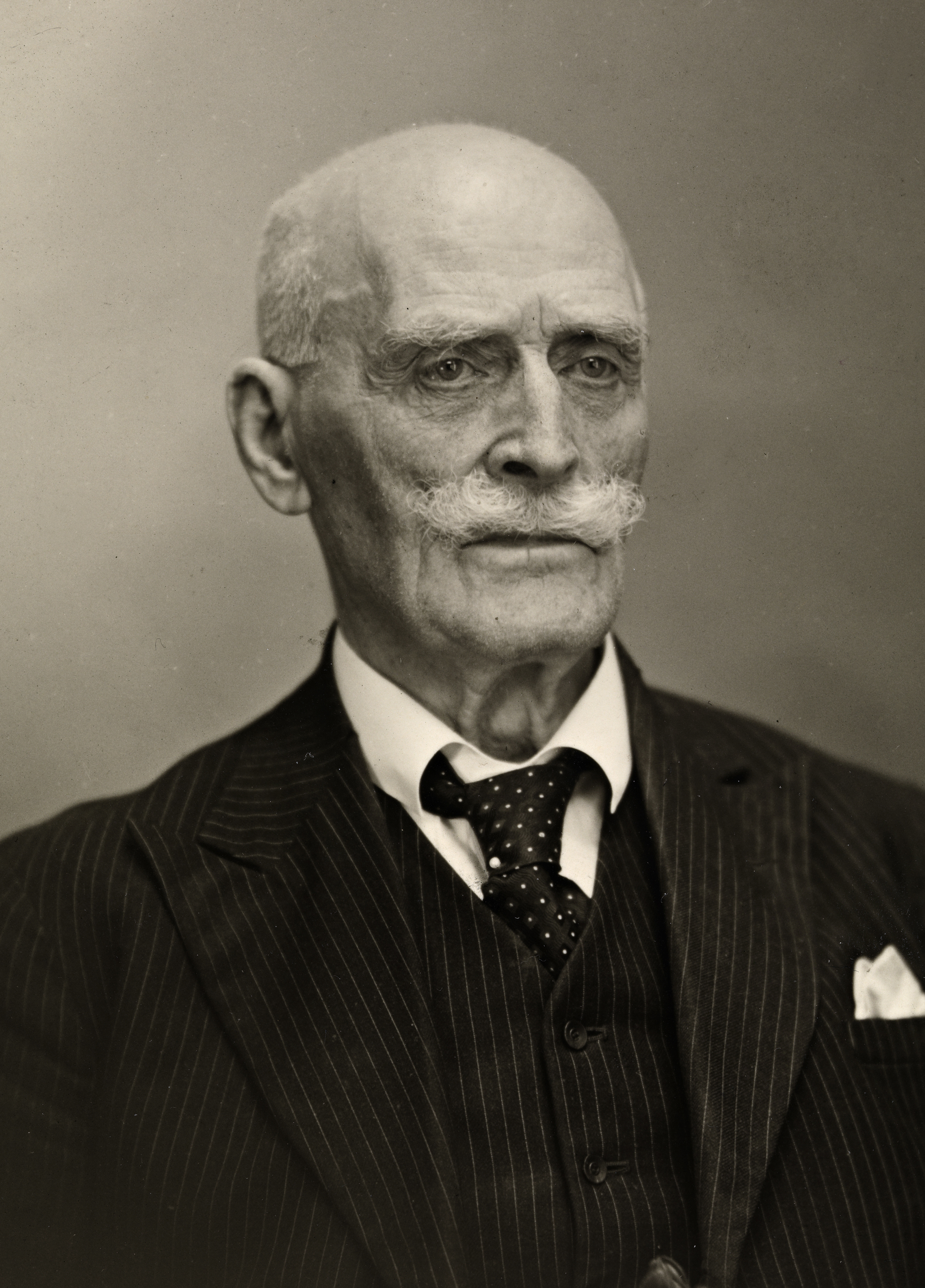
- "for his monumental work, Growth of the Soil."
- Date: 11 November 1920 (Note: The Swedish Academy decided on 11th November 1920 that the 1919 Nobel Prize in Literature should be awarded to Carl Spitteler and that the current year's Nobel Prize in Literature should be awarded to Knut Hamsun.) (announcement); 10 December 1920 (ceremony)
- Location: Stockholm, Sweden
- Presented by: Swedish Academy
- First award: 1901
- Website: Official website

The 1920 Nobel Prize in Literature was awarded to the Norwegian author Knut Hamsun (1859–1952) "for his monumental work, Growth of the Soil." He was the second Norwegian Nobel laureate in literature after Bjørnstjerne Bjørnson won in 1903.

== Laureate ==
The novel Sult ("Hunger", 1890), widely regarded as the first modern novel in Norwegian literature, marked Knut Hamsun's debut as a writer. In his writings, he basically highlights the simple life lived in harmony with nature and shows an aversion to civilization. He admired Germany, which made him sympathetic to the Nazi invasion of Norway in 1940. After the World War II, he was ordered to forfeit his possessions and placed under psychiatric monitoring for a period. He pioneered psychological literature with techniques of stream of consciousness and interior monologue influencing authors such as Kafka, Mann, Miller and Hesse. Among his famous oeuvres include Mysterier ("Mysteries", 1892), Pan (1894), and Victoria (1898), and published one poetry collection, Det vilde Kor ("The Wild Choir", 1904).

=== Growth of the Soil ===
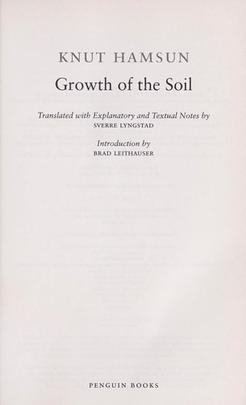

The Nobel Prize was given to Hamsun for his 1917 novel Markens Grøde ("Growth of the Soil"), which is regarded as an epic ode to labor and the interdependence of man and nature. The protagonists in the novel are portrayed as actual individuals, but Hamsun gives the settlers' attempts to develop the wilderness heroic aspects in the manner of the classical poet Hesiod. Employing stream of consciousness, the novel exemplified his aversion to modernity and inclination towards primitivism and the agrarian lifestyle.

== Nobel medal aftermath ==
In 1943, Hamsum met with propaganda minister Joseph Goebbels in Germany. When he came back to Norway that year, he sent his medal to Goebbels as a gesture of thanks for the meeting. Goebbels was honoured to receive it. As of 2025, the whereabouts of the medal are unknown.

== Deliberations ==
=== Nominations ===
Hamsun only received 3 nominations in total for consecutive two years. He first received his nomination in 1918 from Norwegian art historian Harry Fett, but no award was that year due to the deliberations being disrupted by World War I. He then received two nominations in 1920 once again from Harry Fett and Academy member Erik Axel Karlfeldt.

In total, the Nobel Committee earned 27 nominations for authors like Thomas Hardy, Grazia Deledda (awarded in 1926), Georg Brandes, John Galsworthy (awarded in 1932), Władysław Reymont (awarded in 1924), Ebenezer Howard and Juhani Aho. Only one author was newly recommended namely the American historian Wilbur Cortez Abbott and Italian writer Grazia Deledda was the only female nominee.

The authors Paul Adam, Alice E. Bartlett, Alberto Blest Gana, Rhoda Broughton, Giovanni Capurro, Bithia Mary Croker, Richard Dehmel, Paul Ferrier, Mary Evelyn Hitchcock, Matthías Jochumsson, Amanda Kerfstedt, Haralamb Lecca, Alexandru Macedonski, Alexius Meinong, Julia A. Moore, Panas Myrny, Manuel Pérez y Curis, Eleanor H. Porter, Shloyme Zanvl Rappoport (known as S. Ansky), Adolphe-Basile Routhier, Olive Schreiner, Ömer Seyfettin, Helen Ekin Starrett, Maria Antonietta Torriani, Mary Augusta Ward, Max Weber and Wilhelm Wundt died in 1920 died without having been nominated for the prize.

Official list of nominees and their nominators for the prize
No.	Nominee	Country	Genre(s)	Nominator(s)
1	Wilbur Cortez Abbott (1869–1947)	United States	history	Dana Carleton Munro (1866–1933)
2	Juhani Aho (1861–1921)	Finland	novel, short story	Yrjö Hirn (1870–1952)
3	Georg Brandes (1842–1927)	Denmark	literary criticism, essays	Selma Lagerlöf (1858–1940); Sven Hedin (1865–1952); Adolf Noreen (1854–1925); Henrik Schück (1855–1947)
4	Otokar Březina (1868–1929)	Czechoslovakia	poetry, essays	Arne Novák (1880–1939)
5	Grazia Deledda (1871–1936)	Italy	novel, short story, essays	Carl Bildt (1850–1931)
6	Adolf Frey (1855–1920)	Switzerland	biography, history, essays	Wilhelm Oechsli (1851–1919)
7	John Galsworthy (1867–1933)	Great Britain	novel, drama, essays, short story, memoir	Henrik Schück (1855–1947)
8	Arne Garborg (1851–1921)	Norway	novel, poetry, drama, essays	Marius Hægstad (1850–1927); Halvdan Koht (1873–1965); Olof Kolsrud (1885–1945); Norwegian Academy of Science and Letters
9	Ángel Guimerá Jorge (1845–1924)	Spain	drama, poetry	Reial Acadèmia de Bones Lletres de Barcelona
10	Knut Hamsun (1859–1952)	Norway	novel, short story, drama, poetry, essays	Harry Fett (1875–1962); Erik Axel Karlfeldt (1864–1931)
11	Thomas Hardy (1840–1928)	Great Britain	novel, short story, poetry, drama	Edmund Gosse (1849–1928); Anders Österling (1884–1981); Laurence Binyon (1869–1943); Edith Morley (1875–1964); John Bailey (1864–1931); Arthur Quiller-Couch (1863–1944); G. W. Dahlsten (–); English Association; Faculty of Arts and Letters of Durham University
12	Ebenezer Howard (1850–1928)	Great Britain	essays	Christen Collin (1857–1926)
13	Alois Jirásek (1851–1930)	Czechoslovakia	novel, drama	Czech Academy of Sciences
14	Hans Ernst Kinck (1865–1926)	Norway	philology, novel, short story, drama, essays	Gerhard Gran (1856–1925)
15	Władysław Reymont (1867–1925)	Poland	novel, short story	Per Hallström (1866–1960)
16	Carl Spitteler (1845–1924)	Switzerland	poetry, essays	Erik Axel Karlfeldt (1864–1931); Wilhelm Oechsli (1851–1919)

=== Prize decision ===
The Nobel committee of the Swedish Academy had strong doubts to award Knut Hamsun. The committee did not find that Hamsun's often decadent and cynical work represented "what is most excellent in an ideal direction", as was outlined in Alfred Nobel's will. Following the publication of his 1917 novel Growth of the Soil and a nomination for Hamsun in 1920 the committee nevertheless found Hamsun worthy of the prize, but struggled to come to a decision. One dissenting member expressed the view that Hamsun lacked "the culture, the considered world-view and humanity" that ought to suit a worthy recipient of the prize. To suit the "ideal direction", the committee's solution was ultimately to award Hamsun for the single work Growth of the Soil, rather than for his entire oeuvre.

In their report to the Swedish Academy, four members of the Nobel committee proposed that the postponed prize for 1919 should be awarded to the Swiss poet Carl Spitteler and the prize for 1920 to Knut Hamsun in recognition of Growth of the Soil. The fifth committee member, Henrik Schück, oppososed both proposals and in a separate opinion instead proposed that the prize for 1919 should be awarded to Danish literature scholar Georg Brandes, and the prize for 1920 to the Italian Sardinian writer Grazia Deledda.

Other considered but rejected candidates for the prize in 1920 included Thomas Hardy, Arne Garborg, Wladislaw Reymont and John Galsworthy.

On 11 November 1920, the Swedish Academy decided that the Nobel Prize for 1919 should be awarded to Carl Spitteler "in special appreciation of his epic, Olympian Spring", and the prize for 1920 to Knut Hamsun "for his monumental work, Growth of the Soil." Grazia Deledda was subsequently awarded the 1926 Nobel Prize in Literature, Wladislaw Reymont the 1925 Nobel Prize in Literature and John Galsworthy the 1932 Nobel Prize in Literature.
