= 1912 Nobel Prize in Literature =

- Gerhart Hauptmann
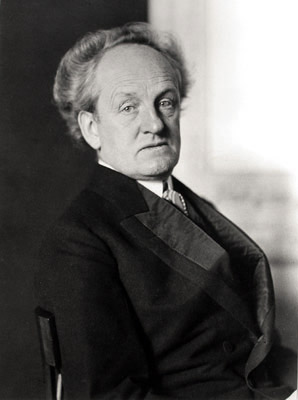
- "primarily in recognition of his fruitful, varied and outstanding production in the realm of dramatic art."
- Date: 13 November 1912 (announcement); 10 December 1912 (ceremony)
- Location: Stockholm, Sweden
- Presented by: Swedish Academy
- First award: 1901
- Website: Official website

The 1912 Nobel Prize in Literature was awarded to the German dramatist and novelist Gerhart Hauptmann (1862–1949) "primarily in recognition of his fruitful, varied and outstanding production in the realm of dramatic art." He is the fourth German author to become a recipient of the prize after Paul Heyse in 1910.

== Laureate ==
Gerhart Hauptmann achieved prominence as one of the pioneers of German Naturalism. Naturalism emphasizes observation and determinism as key concepts. Vor Sonnenaufgang ("Before Sunrise"), a drama he wrote in 1889, launched his career and received critical acclaim at the same time and was followed by other successful plays such as Die Weber ("The Weaver", 1892), Hanneles Himmelfahrt ("The Assumption of Hannele", 1893), and Die versunkene Glocke ("The Sunken Bell", 1896). Hauptmann was inspired by the discussion and quickly produced a series of works with realistic themes. He released Der Narr in Christo Emanuel Quint ("The Fool in Christ, Emanuel Quint)", his debut book, in 1910.

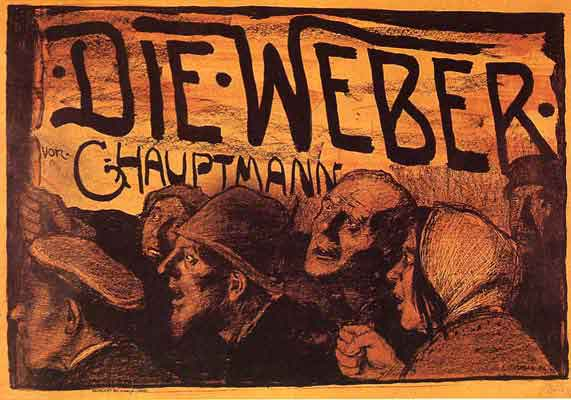
An 1897 poster for the play Die Weber.

== Deliberations ==
=== Nominations ===
Gerhart Huaptmann was nominated in 5 occasions (three in 1902 and one nomination in 1906). His nomination in 1912 was made Erich Schmidt (1853–1913), historian of literature and member of the Royal Prussian Academy of Sciences, which eventually led him to being awarded the prize.

In total, the Nobel Committee of the Swedish Academy received 40 nominations for 30 writers. The highest nominations was for Spanish novelist Benito Pérez Galdós with five nominations. Among the repeated nominees include Henry James, Thomas Hardy, George Bernard Shaw (awarded in 1925), William Chapman, Verner von Heidenstam (awarded in 1916), and Juhani Aho. Ten of the nominees were nominated first-time, among them Henri Bergson (awarded in 1927), Pencho Slaveykov, Sven Hedin, Carl Spitteler (awarded in 1919), Jean-Henri Fabre, Salvatore Farina, Benito Pérez Galdós, Adolf Frey, and James George Frazer. No female authors were nominated that year.

The authors Herman Bang, Robert Barr, Berta Behrens, Alexandre Bisson, Edward Wilmot Blyden, Felix Dahn, Louis de Gramont, Léon Dierx, Horace Howard Furness, Joseph Furphy, Jacques Futrelle, Girish Chandra Ghosh, Theodor Gomperz, George Grossmith, Bertha Jane Grundy, Mir Mosharraf Hossain, Alphonse Lemerre, Lie Kim Hok, Karl May, Gabriel Monod, Giovanni Pascoli, Rafael Pombo, Bolesław Prus, Addison Peale Russell, Bram Stoker, Aleksey Suvorin, Ion Luca Caragiale and Lady Welby died in 1912 without having been nominated for the prize. The Bulgarian poet Pencho Slaveykov died months before the announcement.

Official list of nominees and their nominators for the prize
No.	Nominee	Country	Genre(s)	Nominator(s)
1	Juhani Aho (1861–1921)	Russia (Finland)	novel, short story	Johan Wilhelm Ruuth (1854–1928)
2	Rafael Altamira Crevea (1866–1951)	Spain	history, pedagogy, law, essays	Fermín Canella Secades (1849–1924)
3	Henri Bergson (1859–1941)	France	philosophy	Andrew Lang (1844–1912)
4	William Chapman (1850–1917)	Canada	poetry, translation	Adrien-Bruno Roy (–)
5	Francesco D'Ovidio (1849–1925)	Italy	philology, literary criticism	Ernesto Monaci (1844–1918)
6	Jean-Henri Fabre (1823–1915)	France	short story, essays, poetry	Maurice Maeterlinck (1862–1949) (Note: The nomination was made by several scientists and other individuals, among those F. Mistral and Count M. Maeterlinck.); Frédéric Mistral (1830–1914); Jean Richepin (1849–1926)
7	Salvatore Farina (1846–1918)	Italy	novel, short story	3 members of the Istituto Lombardo Accademia di Scienze e Lettere
8	Anatole France (1844–1924)	France	poetry, essays, drama, novel, literary criticism	Paul Hervieu (1857–1915)
9	James George Frazer (1854–1941)	Great Britain	history, essays, translation	George Augustin Macmillan (1855–1936)
10	Adolf Frey (1855–1920)	Switzerland	biography, history, essays	Wilhelm Oechsli (1851–1919)
11	Karl Adolph Gjellerup (1857–1919)	Denmark	poetry, drama, novel	5 members of the Royal Danish Academy of Sciences and Letters
12	Ángel Guimerá Jorge (1845–1924)	Spain	drama, poetry	6 members of the Institute of Catalan Studies; 13 members of the Reial Acadèmia de Bones Lletres de Barcelona
13	Thomas Hardy (1840–1928)	Great Britain	novel, short story, poetry	70 members of the Royal Society of Literature
14	Gerhart Hauptmann (1862–1946)	Germany	drama, novel	Erich Schmidt (1853–1913)
15	Sven Hedin (1865–1952)	Sweden	essays, autobiography, history	Fredrik Wulff (1845–1930)
16	Harald Høffding (1843–1931)	Denmark	philosophy, theology	12 members of the Royal Danish Academy of Sciences and Letters
17	Henry James (1843–1916)	United States; Great Britain	novel, short story, drama, essays	Barrett Wendell (1855–1921); 2 members of the American Academy of Arts and Letters
18	Hans Ernst Kinck (1865–1926)	Norway	philology, novel, short story, drama, essays	Gerhard Gran (1856–1925)
19	Ernest Lavisse (1842–1922)	France	history	Hans Hildebrand (1842–1913)
20	Pierre Loti (1850–1923)	France	novel, short story, autobiography, essays	René Bazin (1853–1932); Charles de Freycinet (1828–1923); Gabriel Hanotaux (1853–1944); Paul Thureau-Dangin (1837–1913)
21	Benito Pérez Galdós (1843–1920)	Spain	novel, short story, drama, essays	more than 700 members of various literary societies in Spain (Note: The nomination was made by more than 700 members of various literary societies in Spain, divided in 4 nominations.); Jacinto Octavio Picón (1852–1923); José Echegaray Eizaguirre (1832–1916); Eugenio Sellés Ángel (1842–1926); José Rodríguez Carracido (1856–1928)
22	Salvador Rueda Santos (1857–1933)	Spain	poetry, essays	10 professors of the Cardenal Cisneros Institute
23	Karl Schönherr (1867–1943)	Austria-Hungary	drama, short story, poetry	Karl Johan Warburg (1852–1918)
24	George Bernard Shaw (1856–1950)	Great Britain and Ireland	drama, essays, novel	Kristian Birch-Reichenwald Aars (1868–1917)
25	Pencho Slaveykov (1866–1912)	Bulgaria	poetry, essays	Alfred Jensen (1859–1921)
26	Georgios Souris (1853–1919)	Greece	poetry, songwriting	Georgios Hatzidakis (1848–1941)
27	Carl Spitteler (1845–1924)	Switzerland	poetry, essays	professors in Bern and Zürich; Wilhelm Oechsli (1851–1919)
28	Émile Verhaeren (1855–1916)	Belgium	poetry, essays	2 professors of the Free University of Brussels
29	Ernst von der Recke (1848–1933)	Denmark	poetry, drama	Thor Lange (1851–1915); Ewert Wrangel (1863–1940)
30	Verner von Heidenstam (1859–1940)	Sweden	novel, short story, poetry	Fredrik Wulff (1845–1930)

=== Prize decision ===
Of the 30 nominated candidates, the Nobel committee shortlisted five authors as the final candidates considered for the prize. These were French entomologist Jean Henri Fabre, Gerhard Hauptmann, Austrian writer Karl Schönherr, Swisss author Carl Spitteler and French historian Ernest Lavisse. Fabre was considered to be awarded for his ten part series Souvenirs Entomologiques, but his candadicy was dismissed as the committee thought that just one work was not enough for being awarded the Nobel prize. Of the three German-language candidates Hauptmann, Schönherr and Spitteler, three members of the committee supported a prize to Hauptmann while one member proposed Schönherr, or, alternatively a shared prize to Schönherr and Spitteler. Historian Ernest Lavisse was recommended by the Nobel committee as worthy of the award.

On 14 November 1912 the members of the Swedish Academy decided that the Nobel Prize in Literature should be awarded to Gerhard Hauptmann "primarily in recognition of his fruitful, varied and outstanding production in the realm of dramatic art."

Carl Spitteler was subsequently awarded the 1919 Nobel Prize in Literature.
