= 1915 Nobel Prize in Literature =

- Romain Rolland
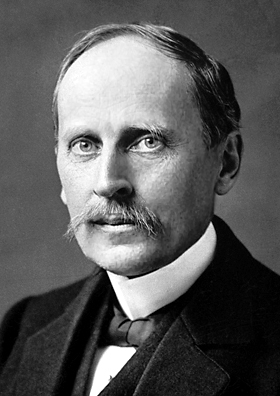
- "as a tribute to the lofty idealism of his literary production and to the sympathy and love of truth with which he has described different types of human beings."
- Date: 9 December 1915 (Note: The Swedish Academy decided on 9th December 1915 that the 1914 Nobel Prize in Literature would not be awarded and that the current year's Nobel Prize in Literature would be reserved for the following year.) (postponement); 9 November 1916 (announcement); 10 December 1916 (ceremony)
- Location: Stockholm, Sweden
- Presented by: Swedish Academy
- First award: 1901
- Website: Official website

The 1915 Nobel Prize in Literature was awarded to the French author Romain Rolland (1866–1944) "as a tribute to the lofty idealism of his literary production and to the sympathy and love of truth with which he has described different types of human beings." The prize was awarded the following year on November 9, 1916 and he is the third Frenchman who became a Nobel recipient for the literature category.

== Laureate ==
Rolland was a mystic and pacifist who studied spirituality, yoga, and Indian philosophy. He established the International Biogentic Society in 1929 to advance harmony, sustainability, and peace. Through communication, he spread the idea of the "oceanic feeling," which refers to the sensation of being at one with the universe, to people like Sigmund Freud and others. Regardless of genre, Rolland's literature centers on humanity's pursuit of pleasure, purpose, and the truth. Jean Christophe Krafft and Anette Rivière, the main protagonists in the novel series Jean-Christophe (1904–1912) and L'Ame enchantée ("The Enchanted Soul", 1922–1933) are in a struggle for both their physical and spiritual existence. In order to define the style of the collection of works, Rolland coined the term "roman-fleuve," which translates to "river-novel." He argued for the democratization of theater in his essay "The People's Theatre."

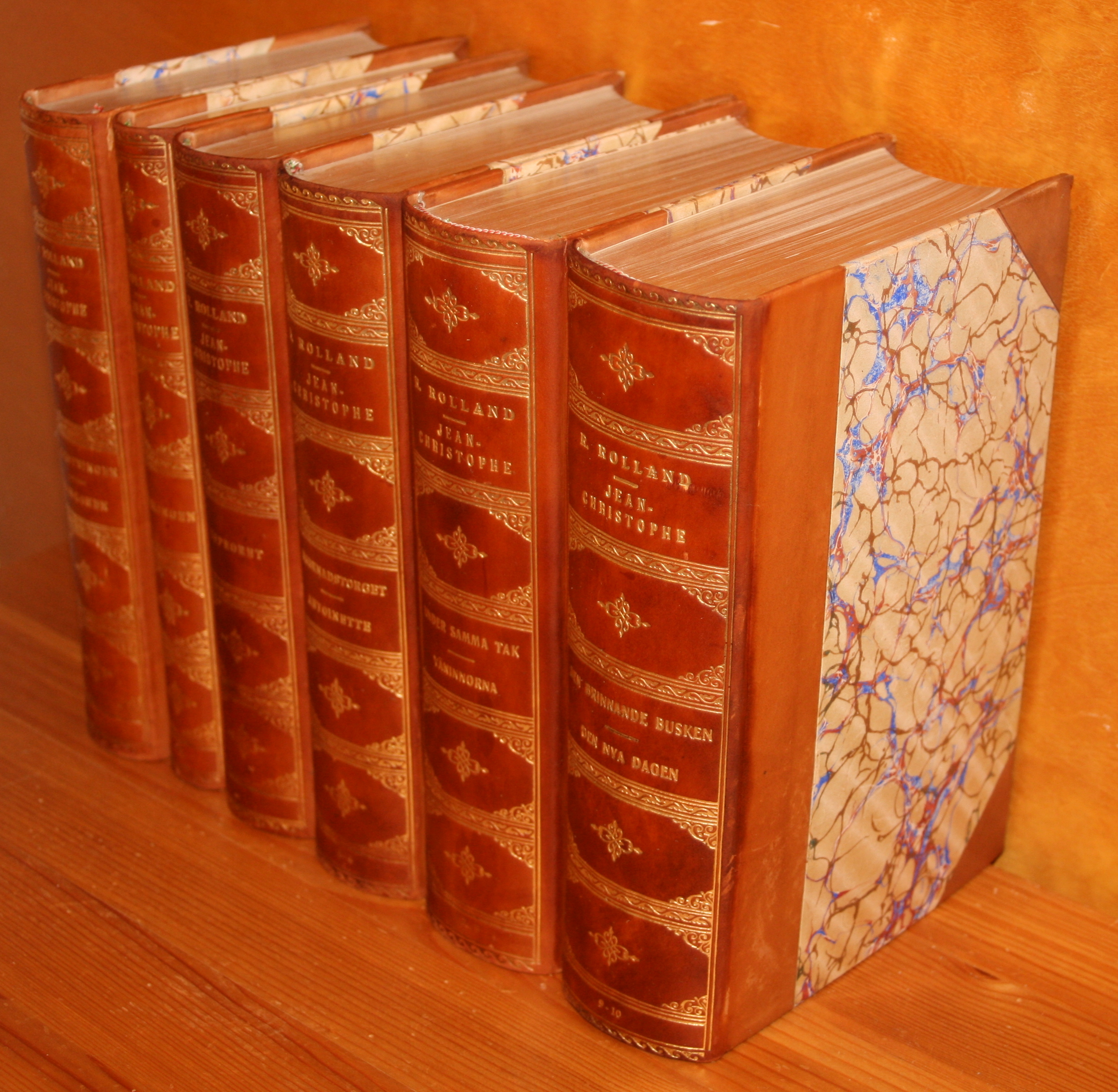
A Swedish translation of Jean-Christophe, 10 parts in 6 volumes

In 1936 Rolland nominated the Austrian neurologist Sigmund Freud for the same category which led the academy's Nobel Committee to a great deal of discussion.

== Deliberations ==
=== Nominations ===
For the 1915 Nobel Prize in Literature, the Swedish Academy received nominations for only 11 writers and therefore decided to add another 11 candidates nominated by committee members. Among these were Romain Rolland, who was awarded the following year after only three nominations. Other newly nominated authors were British explorer Charles Montagu Doughty and German poet Ferdinand Avenarius. The Italian writer Grazia Deledda (subsequently awarded the 1926 Nobel Prize in Literature) – the only female nominee – received the highest number of nominations.

The authors Mary Elizabeth Braddon, Thomas Alexander Browne, Saturnino Calleja, Luigi Capuana, Gaston Arman de Caillavet, Remy de Gourmont, Francisco Giner de los Ríos, Tevfik Fikret, James Elroy Flecker, Justus Miles Forman, Elizabeth Boynton Harbert, Elbert Hubbard, Charles Klein, Aurelio Tolentino, Lucy Bethia Walford, Booker T. Washington, Ellen Gould White, and Julia Ditto Young died in 1915 without having been nominated for the prize.

Official list of nominees and their nominators for the prize
No.	Nominee	Country	Genre(s)	Nominator(s)
1	Juhani Aho (1861–1921)	Russia (Finland)	novel, short story	Karl Alfred Melin (1849–1919)
2	Ferdinand Avenarius (1856–1923)	Germany	poetry	Walther Schmied-Kowarzik (1885–1958); Harald Hjärne (1848–1922)
3	René Bazin (1853–1932)	France	novel	Harald Hjärne (1848–1922)
4	Henri Bergson (1859–1941)	France	philosophy	Per Hallström (1866–1960)
5	Paul Bourget (1852–1935)	France	novel, short story, literary criticism, essays	Karl Alfred Melin (1849–1919)
6	Grazia Deledda (1871–1936)	Italy	novel, short story, essays	Carl Bildt (1850–1931); Ferdinando Martini (1840–1928); Luigi Luzzatti (1841–1927)
7	Charles Montagu Doughty (1843–1926)	Great Britain	poetry, essays	Herbert Warren (1853–1930)
8	Anatole France (1844–1924)	France	poetry, essays, drama, novel, literary criticism	Haakon Shetelig (1877–1955); Henrik Schück (1855–1947)
9	Karl Adolph Gjellerup (1857–1919)	Denmark	poetry, drama, novel	Harald Hjärne (1848–1922)
10	Vilhelm Grønbech (1873–1948)	Denmark	history, essays, poetry	Harald Hjärne (1848–1922)
11	Angel Guimerà y Jorge (1845–1924)	Spain	drama, poetry	Fredrik Wulff (1845–1930); members of the Reial Acadèmia de Bones Lletres de Barcelona
12	Willem Kloos (1859–1938)	Netherlands	poetry, essays, literary criticism	Per Hallström (1866–1960)
13	Josef Svatopluk Machar (1864–1942)	Austria-Hungary (Czechoslovakia)	poetry, essays, novel	professors in Prague
14	Dmitry Merezhkovsky (1865–1941)	Russia	novel, essays, poetry, drama	Karl Alfred Melin (1849–1919)
15	Benito Pérez Galdós (1843–1920)	Spain	novel, short story, drama, essays	Per Hallström (1866–1960)
16	Romain Rolland (1866–1944)	France	novel, drama, essays	Henrik Schück (1855–1947)
17	Salvador Rueda Santos (1857–1933)	Spain	poetry, essays	professors in Madrid
18	Carl Spitteler (1845–1924)	Switzerland	poetry, essays	Jonas Fränkel (1879–1965)
19	Émile Verhaeren (1855–1916)	Belgium	poetry, essays	Christen Collin (1857–1926)
20	Ernst von der Recke (1848–1933)	Denmark	poetry, drama	Karl Alfred Melin (1849–1919)
21	Verner von Heidenstam (1859–1940)	Sweden	novel, short story, poetry	Fredrik Wulff (1845–1930)
22	William Butler Yeats (1865–1939)	Ireland	poetry, drama, essays	Per Hallström (1866–1960)

=== Prize decision ===
The Nobel committee proposed that the 1915 Nobel prize in Literature should be awarded to the Spanish author Benito Pérez Galdós, and the postponed prize for 1914 to the Swiss writer Carl Spitteler. Two members of the committee opposed that Pérez Galdos was awarded and instead proposed the French writer Romain Rolland.

No prize was awarded in 1915, but in 1916 the prize for 1915 was awarded to Romain Rolland. A politically controversial choice as Rolland at the time of World War I had made himself unpopular in both Germany and his native France.

Carl Spitteler was subsequently awarded the 1919 Nobel Prize in Literature.
