= Wilbur Cortez Abbott =

American historian and educator

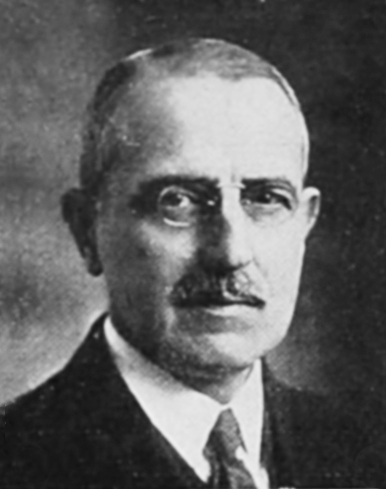
- Born: December 28, 1869; Kokomo, Indiana, U.S.
- Died: February 3, 1947 (aged 77); Boston, Massachusetts, U.S.
- Education: Wabash College; Cornell University
- Scientific career
- Fields: History
- Workplaces: Cornell University; University of Michigan; Dartmouth College; University of Kansas; Yale University; Harvard University
- Notable students: Robert G. Albion

Wilbur Cortez Abbott (December 28, 1869 – February 3, 1947) was an American historian and educator, born at Kokomo, Indiana.

== Career ==
He graduated from Wabash College in 1892. Afterward, he studied at Cornell University (1892–95) and at Oxford in 1897 where he received the degree of B.Litt.

In the United States, he worked at various institutions of higher learning including Cornell, University of Michigan, Dartmouth, University of Kansas, before being hired in 1908 at Yale. During his time at Yale he gained wide scholastic attention with the publication of The Expansion of Europe in 1917.

In 1920 he was offered a position at Harvard University, in substitution of Harold Laski. At Harvard Abbott became the Francis Lee Higginson Professor of History. There he also became a stock-holder in the Harvard Cooperative Society, and an Associate of Lowell House.

Abbott was elected a Fellow of the American Academy of Arts and Sciences in 1921.

Abbott was an admirer of Oliver Cromwell (a notable English military and political leader in the 17th century), owning memorabilia of his and authoring a bibliography book of Cromwell's works.

Abbott advised Robert G. Albion in his notable doctoral thesis Forests and Sea Power: The Timber Problem of the Royal Navy, published in 1926.

== Author ==
He wrote

- Colonel Thomas Blood, Crown Stealer (1911)
- Expansion of Europe (1917)
- Colonel John Scott of Long Island (1918)
- Conflicts with Oblivion (1924)
- The War and American Democracy
- The New Barbarians (1925)
- A Bibliography of Oliver Cromwell (1929)
- New York in the American revolution (1929)

== Honors ==
Around 1930 Abbott visited Finland, where The Harvard Crimson recounts "the Professor landed in Finland only to discover that he was something of a national figure. He was feted; he was invited to important function; his picture was printed in the papers. Professor Abbott has always been fond of Finland"

In 1920, Abbott was nominated for the Nobel Prize in Literature by American historian Dana Carleton Munro.

== Bibliography ==
Essays in Modern English History in Honor of Wilbur Cortez Abbott, Harvard University Press, 1941
