= Ragnar Josephson =

Swedish art historian and writer

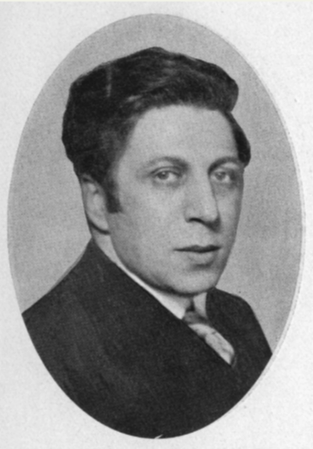
Ragnar Josephson

Ragnar Josephson (Stockholm 8 March 1891 - Lund 27 March 1966) was a Swedish art historian and writer.

Josephson was professor of art history at Lund University 1929-1957 and founder of the Archive for Decorative Art there. He was director of the Royal Dramatic Theatre in Stockholm 1948–1951, and was elected a member of the Swedish Academy in 1960.

== Notes ==
Cultural offices
Preceded by Per Hallström	Swedish Academy, Seat No.14; 1960–1966	Succeeded by Lars Gyllensten
