= Jakob Frey =

Swiss writer (1824–1875)

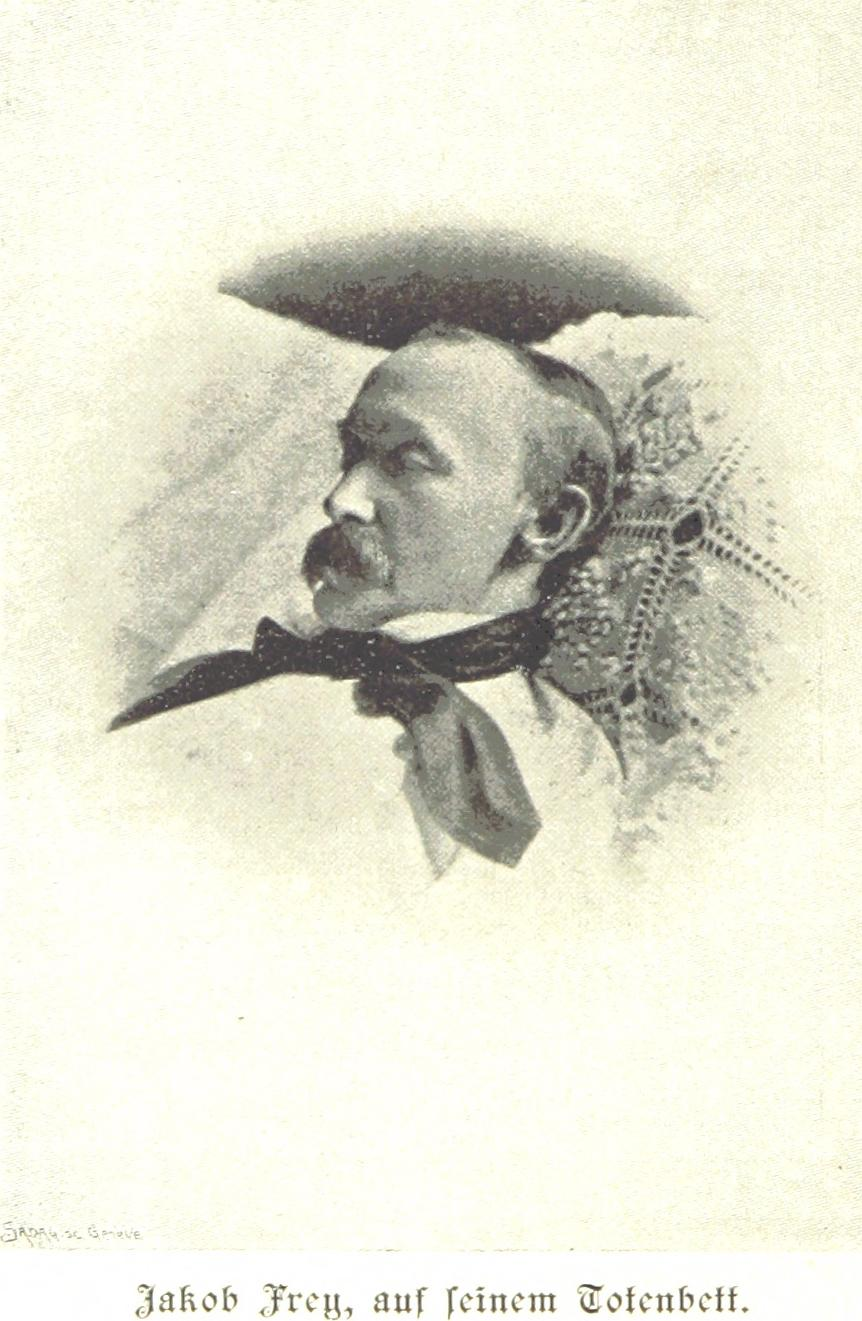
Post mortem photograph of Jakob Frey.

Jakob Frey (13 May 1824 ‒ 30 December 1875) was a Swiss writer of short stories about peasant life. He used the pseudonyms J. Reif, F. Kuhn, F. Imhoof, and J. A.

== Life ==
Jakob Frey was born into a large farming family in Gontenschwil. He studied philology and philosophy in Tübingen, Munich and Zürich. From 1851 he lived in Aarau where he edited Der Schweizerbote. He was elevated to the Grand Council of Aargau where he was elected secretary. However this work was unappealing to him and in 1856 he moved to Bern, where he began editing the Berner Zeitung. In 1861 he moved to Basel, and in 1865 he went back to Bern before returning to Aarau in 1868. He died in Bern.

Frey was not a particularly prolific writer of short stories, but those he wrote are often considered to be among the best of Swiss literature. His son Adolf Frey (1855–1920) published his remaining manuscripts and wrote a biography.

== Works ==
- Zwischen Jura und Alpen. Erzählungen und Lebensbilder. 2 vols. Weber, Leipzig 1858
- Die Waise von Holligen. Erzählung aus den Tagen des Untergangs der alten Eidgenossenschaft. Krüsi, Basel 1863
- Schweizerbilder. Erzählungen aus der Heimath. 2 vols. Sauerländer, Aarau 1864
- Neue Schweizerbilder. Erzählungen. Frobeen, Bern 1877
- Gesammelte Erzählungen. 5 vols. Sauerländer, Aarau 1897

== Bibliography ==
- Adolf Frey: Jakob Frey. Ein Lebensbild. In: Gesammelte Erzählungen, Band 5, Aarau 1897
- Albert Schumann (1877). "Frey, Jakob" . Allgemeine Deutsche Biographie (in German). Vol. 7. Leipzig: Duncker & Humblot. pp. 360–361.
