= Antonio Serra Morant =

Spanish lawyer

- Born: 17 December 1866; Alicante, Kingdom of Spain
- Died: 7 August 1939 (aged 72); Madrid, Spanish State
- Citizenship: Spanish
- Occupations: Lawyer and writer
- Spouse: María del Carmen Piñar Espejo
- Children: Antonio Serra Piñar
- Writing career
- Language: Spanish
- Notable work: "La Casa de la Paz"

Antonio Serra Morant (17 December 1866, Alicante – 7 August 1939, Madrid) was a Spanish lawyer and juridical writer.

== Biography ==
Serra Morant in Alicante on 17 December 1866.

=== Career ===
At the age of just 23, Serra Morant obtained his law degree from the University of Valencia. In March 1892, he was located in Madrid, where he read his thesis: "El derecho internacional privado. Sus orígenes, sus principios fundamentales y unificación del mismo", which is now in his personal file at the National Historical Archive at the Central University. Subsequently, he became a member of the Ilustre Colegio de la Abogacía de Madrid.

Serra Morant worked as a "lawyer for the poor" until 1897, according to the register of the Madrid Bar Association, and then obtained a position as a court clerk in Alcalá la Real. He arrived in Granada two years later, after winning the position of rapporteur of the Court by competitive examination. In the capital of Granada, Serra Morant played a very important role that extended beyond the magistracy.

=== "La Casa de la Paz" ===
In 1913, Serra Morant wrote a pamphlet that earned him nominations for the Nobel Prize. "La Casa de la Paz", published by Artes Gráficas Casa Sabatel, was an immediate success, as can be seen from the almost instantaneous reissue that was made of it and from the glowing reviews that appeared in newspapers such as La Gaceta del Sur or Iris.

==== Nobel Prize ====
In the book, Serra Morant himself explains the reasons for writing the work and refers directly to the members of the Nobel jury in the preliminary warning: "We ask readers, and especially the gentlemen who make up the learned Nobel Committee of the Norwegian Parliament, to forgive us this kind of anachronism."

A year later, in 1914, Serra Morant was proposed as a candidate for the Nobel Prize in Literature and the Nobel Peace Prize. The first nomination was headed by Eloy Señán Alonso, professor at the Faculty of Philosophy and Letters of the University of Granada, an institution of which he would be rector years later. Ángel Garrido Quintana, professor of Universal History at the same university and treasurer of the Centre for Historical Studies of Granada, was responsible for the second nomination, citing the creation of "La Casa de la Paz" as the motivation for the proposal in 1915 and 1916.

The outbreak of the World War I prevented the jury from delivering its verdict, which resulted in the cancellation of the 1914 edition of the awards.

Ángel Garrido did not give up after what happened. A year later, in 1915, the professor again nominated Serra Morant in the Peace category with the same motivation. "The nominator made reference to 'La Casa de la Paz'," recalls the Nobel archive. However, the prize was not awarded at that edition either. The last nomination came in 1926, also in the same category. The proposal was sent by José Cesare García, professor of history at the University of Valencia, the institution where the candidate from Granada had trained decades earlier.

Before his Nobel nominations, Serra Morant campaigned for the historian Marcelino Menéndez Pelayo for the Nobel Prize by writing an article in La Gaceta del Sur entitled "Menéndez Pelayo y la Premio Nobel". In a letter to the writer, Serra Morant expressed his admiration and saying the historian deserved such a prize.

=== Later life ===
Serra Morant later resettled in Madrid, where he worked as secretary of the Contentious-Administrative Chamber of the Supreme Court.

He died on 7 August 1939 at his residence.

== Personal life ==
He married María del Carmen Piñar Espejo, daughter of the writer Carmen Espejo, who was responsible for publishing his works in newspapers at the time. They had a son named Antonio Serra Piñar, who also became a lawyer and academic.
