= Thor Lange (writer) =

Danish writer

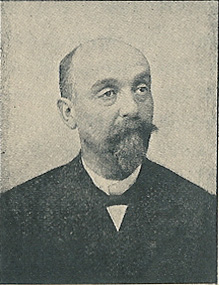
Thor Lange

Thor Næve Lange (9 April 1851 – 22 February 1915) was a Danish author.

== Biography ==
He was born in Copenhagen. About 1877 he went to Moscow as Danish consul. His works include translations from ancient Greek, Old French, and Russian, and he made a good translation of Longfellow's Golden Legend (3d ed. 1891). He also compiled Skildringer fra den russiske Literatur (1886). His original volumes include: En maaned i Orienten; Flygtize Skizzer (1887); Skitser og Phantaseir (1890); and a collection of his poems, Gennem farret Glas (1894).
