= Jakob Knudsen =

Danish author, educator and clergyman

Jakob Christian Lindberg Knudsen
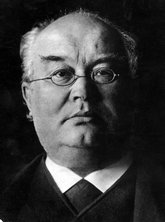
- Born: 14 September 1858
- Died: 21 January 1917 (aged 58)

Jakob Christian Lindberg Knudsen (14 September 1858 – 21 January 1917) was a Danish author, educator and clergyman.

== Biography ==
Jakob Knudsen was born in Rødding, in the south of Denmark. Knudsen spent much of his childhood at Aggersborg in Hanherred. In his youth, he was largely home schooled by his parents who followed the spiritual principals of Grundtvig. In 1862, the family moved to Dalum, where his father was a teacher at Christen Kold Folk High School. In 1872, the family moved to Lunderskov where his father served the parishes of Jordrup and Lejrskov.

From 1875 to 1881, Jakob Knudsen studied theology at the University of Copenhagen. He graduated in 1881 with a Cand.theol. He started his career as a teacher at Askov folk high school and later worked as a priest at the village of Mellerup in Randers.

His breakthrough as a writer came in 1899 with the book Den gamle præst (The Old Priest). In 1901, he moved with his family to Hillerød and in 1909 to Birkerød, where he devoted himself to writing.

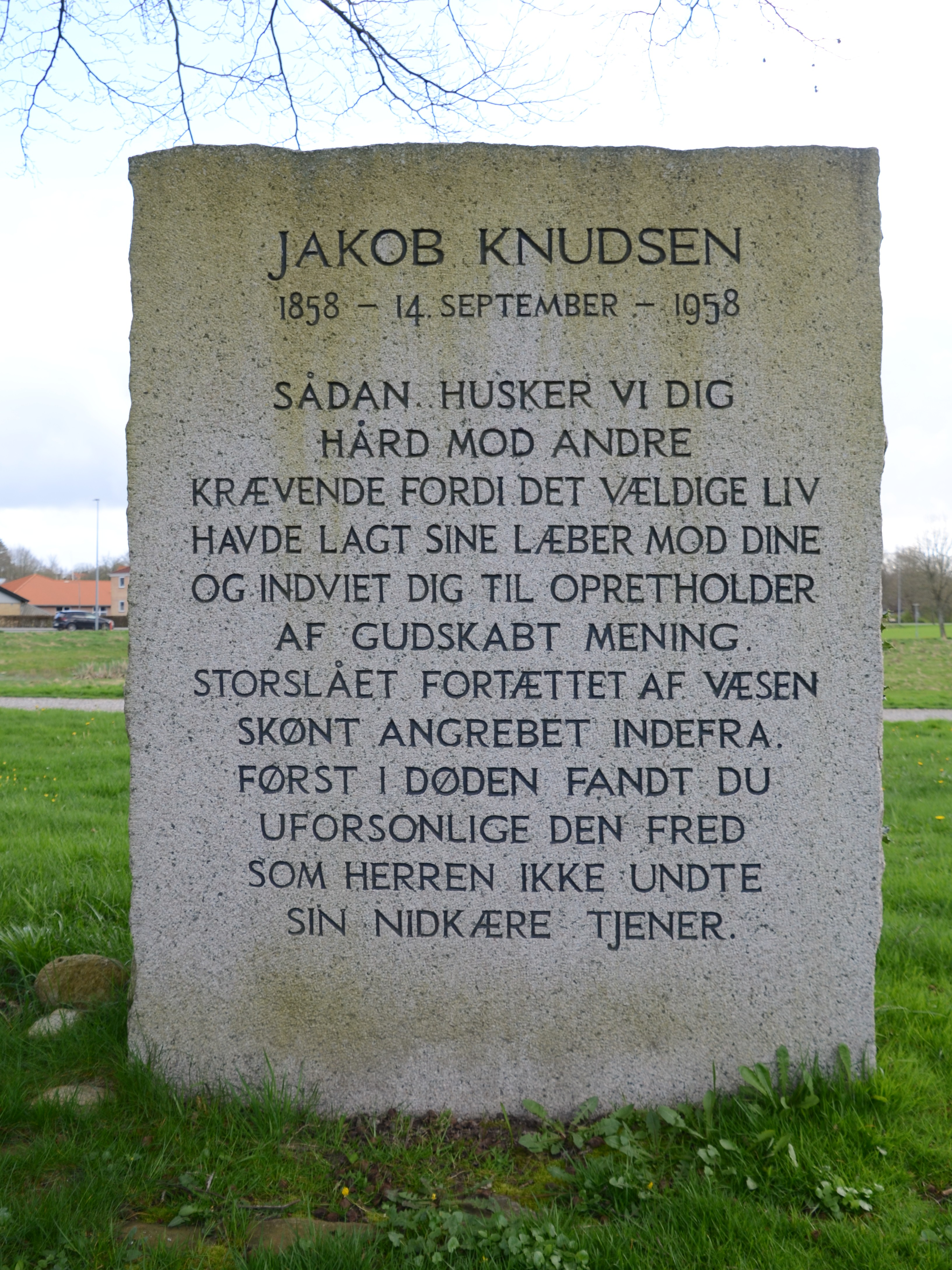
Memorial stone near the folk high school in Rødding

== Selected works ==
- Den gamle præst (1899)
- Gjæring – Afklaring (1902)
- Inger (1906)
- Fremskridt (1907)
- Lærer Urup (1909)
- To slægter (1910)
- Rodfæstet (1911)
- Angst (1912)
- Mod (1914)
