= Otokar Březina =

Czech poet and essayist

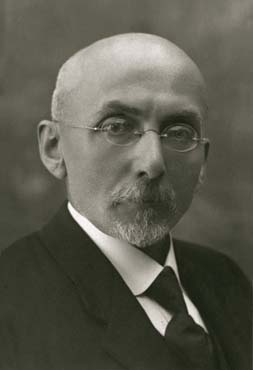
- Writing career
- Movement: Symbolism

Václav Jebavý (13 September 1868 – 25 March 1929); mostly known by his pen name of Otokar or Otakar Březina (Czech pronunciation: [ˈotokar ˈbr̝ɛzɪna]); was a Czech poet and essayist, considered the greatest of Czech Symbolists.

== Biography ==
Březina was born in the small town of Počátky, Pelhřimov District, and took his inspiration from the mysterious landscape of the Českomoravská Vrchovina region, straddling Bohemia and Moravia, where he spent his whole life.

Almost all of his works were created during a period of 13 years while he was working as a teacher in Nová Říše, a small town with a monastery; he regularly visited the large library to study various books by medieval philosophers, especially German and French mysticists, and thus recovered from the shock caused by the sudden death of both his parents. Around 1895 he pondered questions regarding the meaning of life, and wrote his first book of poems Tajemné dálky, expressing his separation from the outer world and his seeking solace in the arts.

In his second book, Svítání na západě (1896), Březina explored pain as a means of cognition, and held death to be the key to understanding the mystery of life. His third book, Větry od pólů (1897), shows him shifting focus from his personal pain to the issue of human solidarity, as well as his endeavor to merge with the life energy of the Cosmos; the feeling of belonging to "Everything" is more perceptible in his next book Stavitelé chrámu (where he glorified the ingenious personalities as the bearers of development.), and culminates in his last book of poems, Ruce (1901), in a vision of a magical chain formed by all hands, building up the external world. Březina's sixth book of poems, Země, remained unfinished.

Březina's poetical expression, very rich in metaphors and parables, religious elements and philosophical and even scientific terms, merged gradually from rhythmical alexandrines into broad free verse, filled with sensual images, rich in thought and musical taste. His books of essays constitute the integral part of his work, and his extensive correspondence serves as a commentary on his creative activities and philosophy. Březina is also noted for the friendships which he formed with other Czech cultural figures, including the Symbolist sculptor František Bílek, the literary critic, sociologist and political scientist Emanuel Chalupný, the poet, prose writer, and priest Jakub Deml, and the philosopher and writer Ladislav Klíma.

Březina was nominated multiple times for the Nobel Prize in Literature by Arne Novak and other Czech literature professors.

He died in Jaroměřice nad Rokytnou. There are various discourses and monographs on Otokar Březina, of which arguably the largest is the one written by Oldřich Králík in 1948; an English-language study and translation of Březina, Otokar Březina: a Study in Czech Literature, was written by Paul Selver in 1921. Březina's original and soaring poetry influenced a considerable number of Czech modern poets.

== Works ==
- Tajemné dálky ("Mysterious Ranges") – 1895, poems
- Svítání na západě ("Sunrise in the West") – 1896, poems
- Větry od pólů ("Winds from the Poles") – 1897, poems
- Stavitelé chrámu ("Builders of the Temple") – 1899, poems
- Ruce ("Hands") – 1901, poems
- Hudba pramenů ("Music of the Springs") – 1903, essays
- Skryté dějiny ("Hidden History") – essays (published posthumously). English translation: Březina, Otokar. 1997. Hidden history. Prague: Twisted Spoon Press.
