= Henrik Schück =

Swedish university professor (1855–1947)

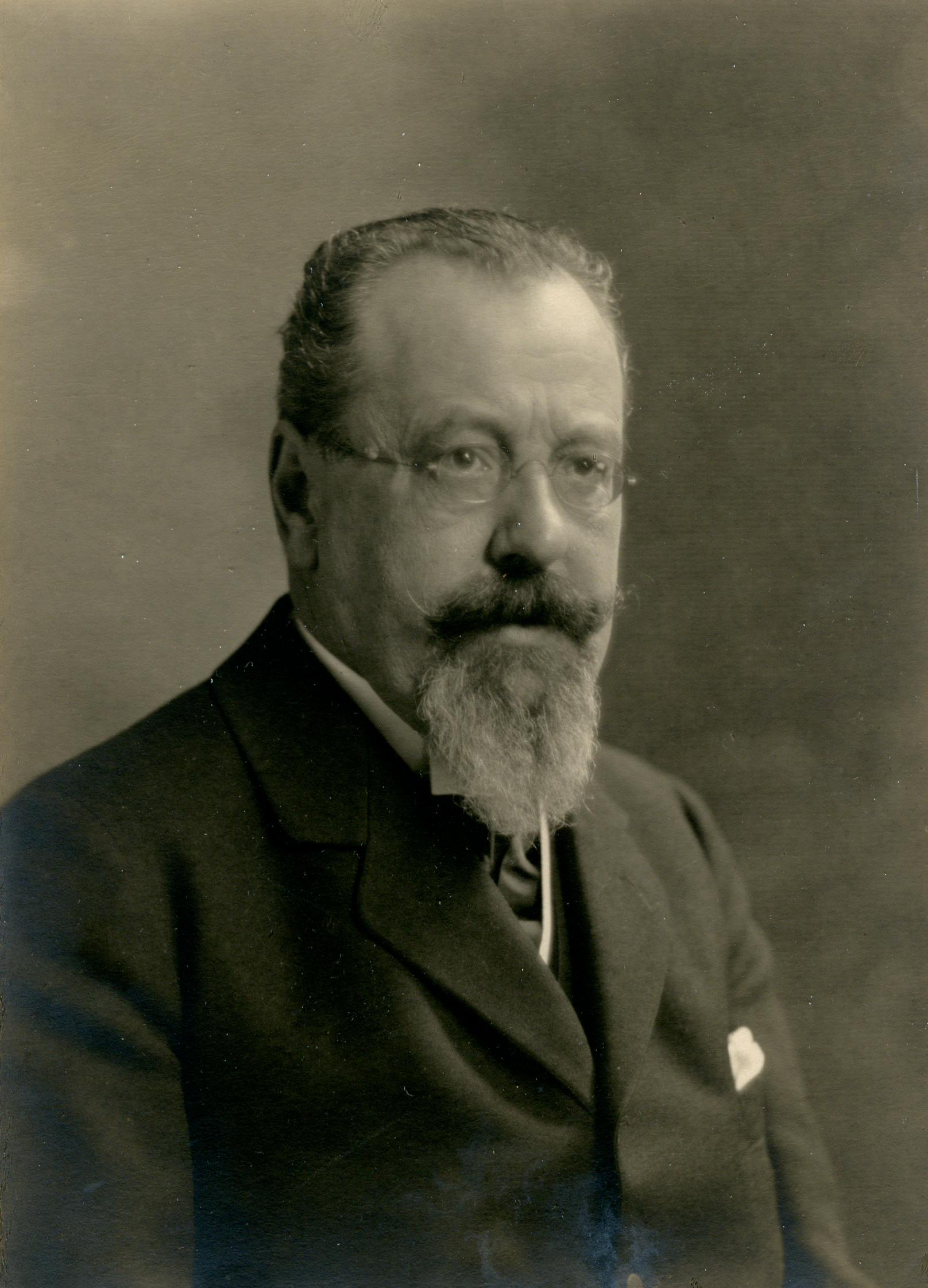
- Born: 2 November 1855
- Died: 3 October 1947 (aged 91)

Academic work
- Discipline: literary history
- Institutions: Lund University; Uppsala University
- Notable works: Illustrerad svensk litteraturhistoria

Henrik Schück (2 November 1855 – 3 October 1947) was a Swedish literary historian, university professor and author.

== Biography ==
Johan Henrik Emil Schück was a professor at the Lund University 1890–1898. He was a professor at Uppsala University from 1898 to 1920 and later Rector from 1905 to 1918. He was a member of the Swedish Academy 1913–1947, holding seat 3. He served as a member of the Nobel Committee of the academy from 1920 to 1936. He was Chairman of the Board of the Nobel Foundation 1918–1929. He was also a member of the Royal Swedish Academy of Letters, History and Antiquities and the Royal Swedish Academy of Sciences.

In 1880, Schück was one of the founders of the Swedish Literature Society in Uppsala. He developed a reputation as a foremost literary historical researchers. He worked on the development of historic literature studies with university professor and librarian of the Nobel Library of the Swedish Academy, Karl Johan Warburg (1852-1918). They jointed edited Illustrerad svensk litteraturhistoria which covers Swedish literature for the period up to 1870. He also wrote a series of biographies of historic figures including Engelbrekt Engelbrektsson, Olaus Petri, King Gustav III as well as William Shakespeare.

== Selected works ==
- William Schakspere, hans lif och verksamhet, (1883–84)
- Skrifter i svensk litteraturhistoria, (1887)
- Våra äldsta historiska folkvisor, (1891)
- Lars Wivallius, hans lif och dikter, 2 vol., (1893–95)
- Allmän litteraturhistoria, (several versions)
- Bidrag till svensk bokhistoria, (1900)
- Engelbrekt (1915)
- Illustrerad svensk litteraturhistoria, three volumes; with Karl Warburg (1917–18)

== Sources ==
- Johannesson, Hans-Erik and Lars Lönnroth (1990) Den Svenska Litteraturen VII ISBN 91-34-51422-8
- This article is fully or partially based on material from Nordisk familjebok, Schück, Johan Henrik Emil 1855-1947.

Cultural offices
Preceded by Carl Gustaf Malmström	Swedish Academy, Seat No 3; 1913–1947	Succeeded by Henrik Samuel Nyberg
Non-profit organization positions
Preceded by Fredrik Wachtmeister	Chairman of the Nobel Foundation; 1918–1929	Succeeded by Hjalmar Hammarskjöld
Academic offices
Preceded by Olof Hammarsten	Rector of Uppsala University; 1905 – 1918	Succeeded by Ludvig Stavenow
