= Edmond Picard =

Belgian jurist and writer

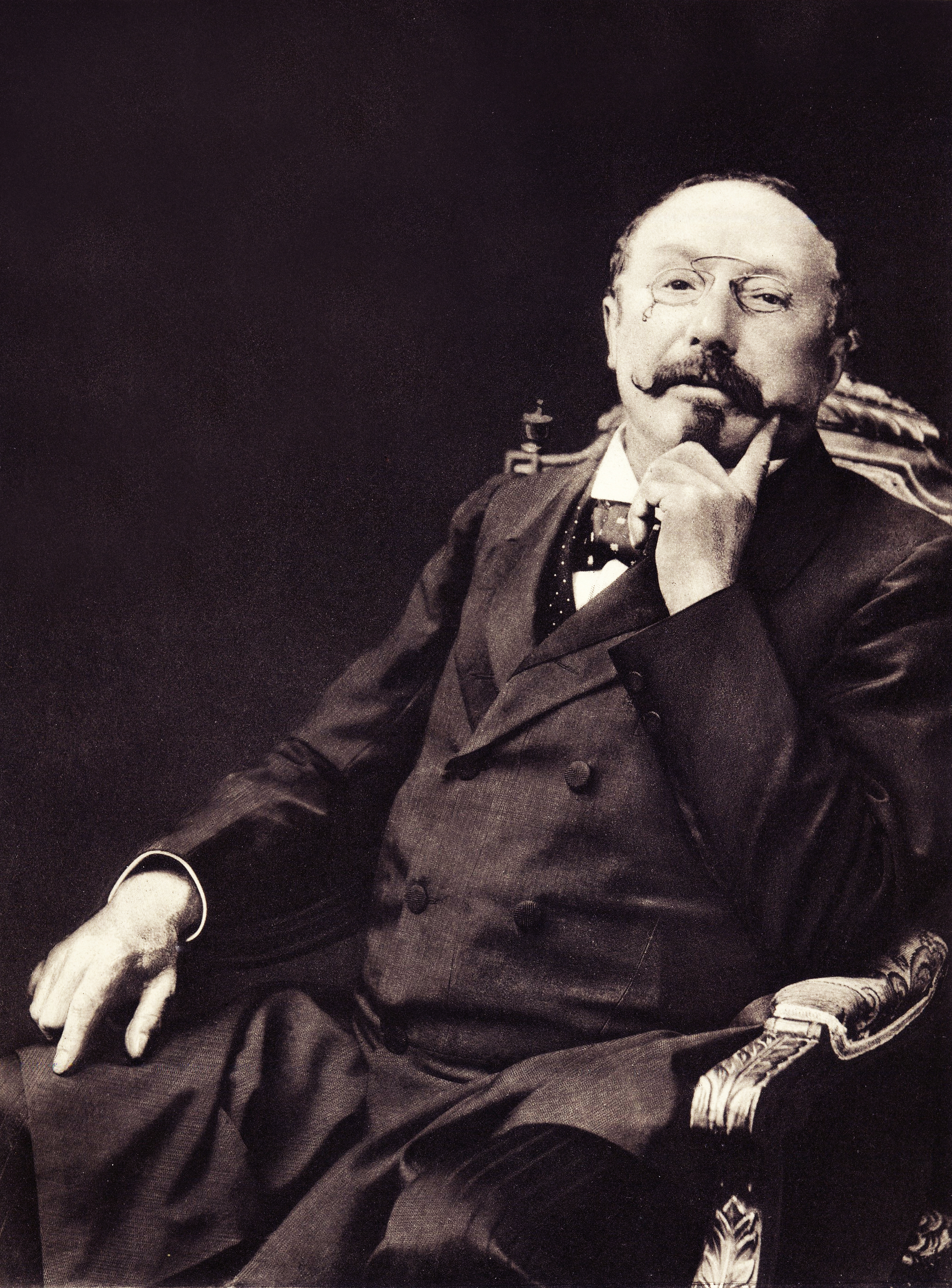
- Born: 15 December 1836; Brussels, Belgium
- Died: 19 February 1924 (aged 87); Namur, Belgium
- Occupations: jurist, playwright, journalist

Edmond Picard (15 December 1836 – 19 February 1924) was a Belgian jurist and writer. He was a leading theoretician of antisemitism and racism in Belgium, as well as a champion of Belgian nationalism through his notions of the "Belgian soul" and Belgian martyrdom in World War I. He was nominated for the Nobel Prize in Literature five times.

== Career ==
He was lawyer at the court of appeal and the Court of Cassation of Belgium. He was also head of the Belgian bar association, professor of law, playwright and journalist. Involved in politics, he was senator for the Belgian Labour Party. He also was a patron of the arts.

The Symbolist poet Émile Verhaeren frequented Picard's literary salon and worked as a law intern at Picard's office between 1881 and 1884 before abandoning his legal career in favour of writing; Verhaeren too went on to receive multiple nominations for the Nobel Prize in Literature.

== Views ==
Picard propagated virulent racism and antisemitism in his works, such as Synthèse de l'antisémitisme (1892, reprinted 1942) and En Congolie (1896). He interpreted human society and its conflicts through the prism of race, claiming that Jews are "parasitic" and that Black people are "imitators like the apes". On account of his extremism he has been compared with the proto-fascist Édouard Drumont in France. Bernard-Henri Lévy considers him to have been the "first consistent disciple of Arthur de Gobineau" and "the inventor of French-style national socialism".

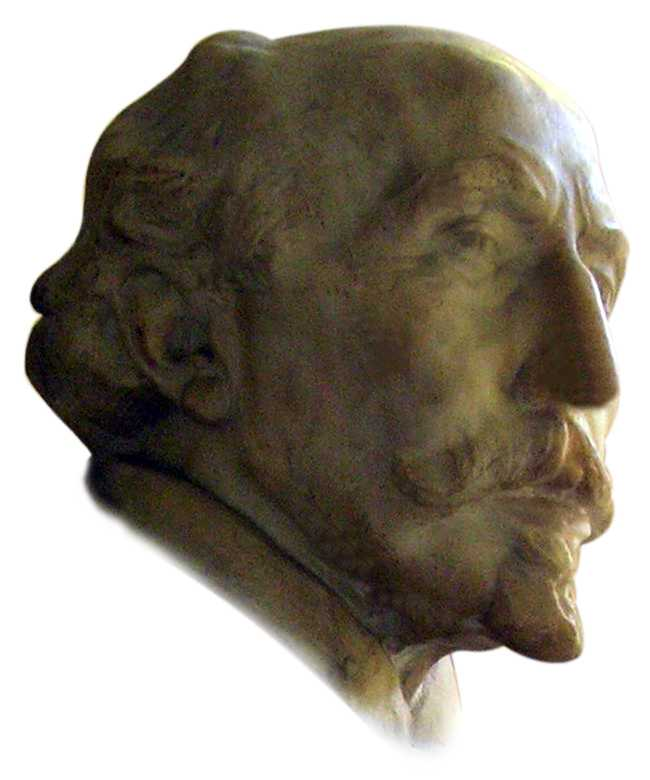
Bust of Edmond Picard by Louis Mascré 1910

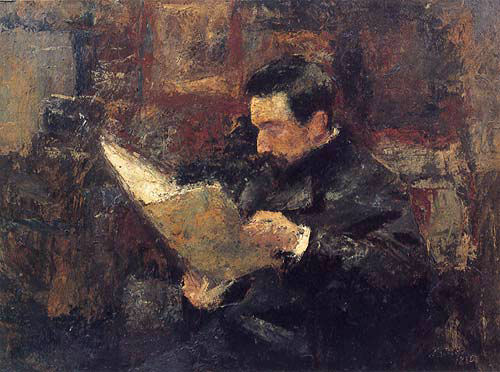
Portrait of Edmond Picard by Jan Toorop

== Bibliography ==
- Aron, Paul; Vanderpelen-Diagre, Cécile (2013), Edmond Picard (1836-1924): un bourgeois socialiste belge à la fin du dix-neuvième siècle, Brussels: Musées royaux des Beaux-Arts de Belgique, ISBN 978-9077013007
- Lévy, Bernard-Henri (1981), L'Idéologie française, Paris: Grasset, ISBN 9782253031376
- Ringelheim, Foulek (1999), Edmond Picard, jurisconsulte de race, Brussels: Larcier, ISBN 2804404331
