= Arne Novák =

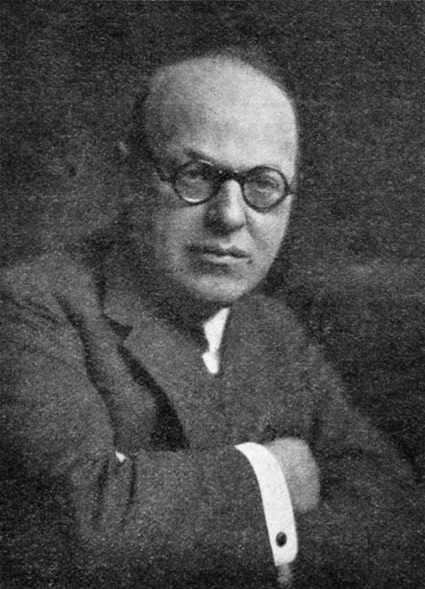
Arne Novák before 1929

Arne Novák, born as Arnošt Novák (2 March 1880 – 26 November 1939), was a Czech literary historian and critic. He specialised in German and Czech studies.

== Life ==
Arne Novák was born on 2 March 1880 in Litomyšl, Bohemia, Austria-Hungary. He was the son of the high school teacher Josef Novák (born March 3, 1847, in Prague) and writer Teréza Nováková, née Langhaus, and attended secondary school in Litomyšl and Prague. Between 1898 and 1902, he studied German and Czech philology at Charles University in Prague, as well as in Berlin, Heidelberg, and Munich, earning his doctorate in philosophy in Prague in 1902. He qualified as a university lecturer in the history of Czech literature there in 1906 and subsequently served as a secondary school professor until 1920.

From 1920 to 1939, he was a full professor of Czech literature at Masaryk University in Brno. He served twice as rector of the university between 1938 and 1939. From 1921 onward, he also worked as a regular contributor to the newspaper Lidové noviny. From 1930 to 1939, he was editor of the encyclopedia Ottův slovník naučný nové doby and contributed to the journals Volné směry, Lumír, and Rozhledy among others. He died on 26 November 1939 in Polička.

Novák was a member of the Royal Bohemian Society of Sciences and the National Council for Scientific Research in Prague, among other organizations.

Arne Novák made a significant contribution to the understanding of Czech literary culture, and his work has been widely translated into numerous European languages. He remains an influential essayist to this day, although his works were not republished after the February Uprising of 1948 until the 1990s.

== See also ==
- List of Czech writers
