= Harald Hjärne =

Swedish historian

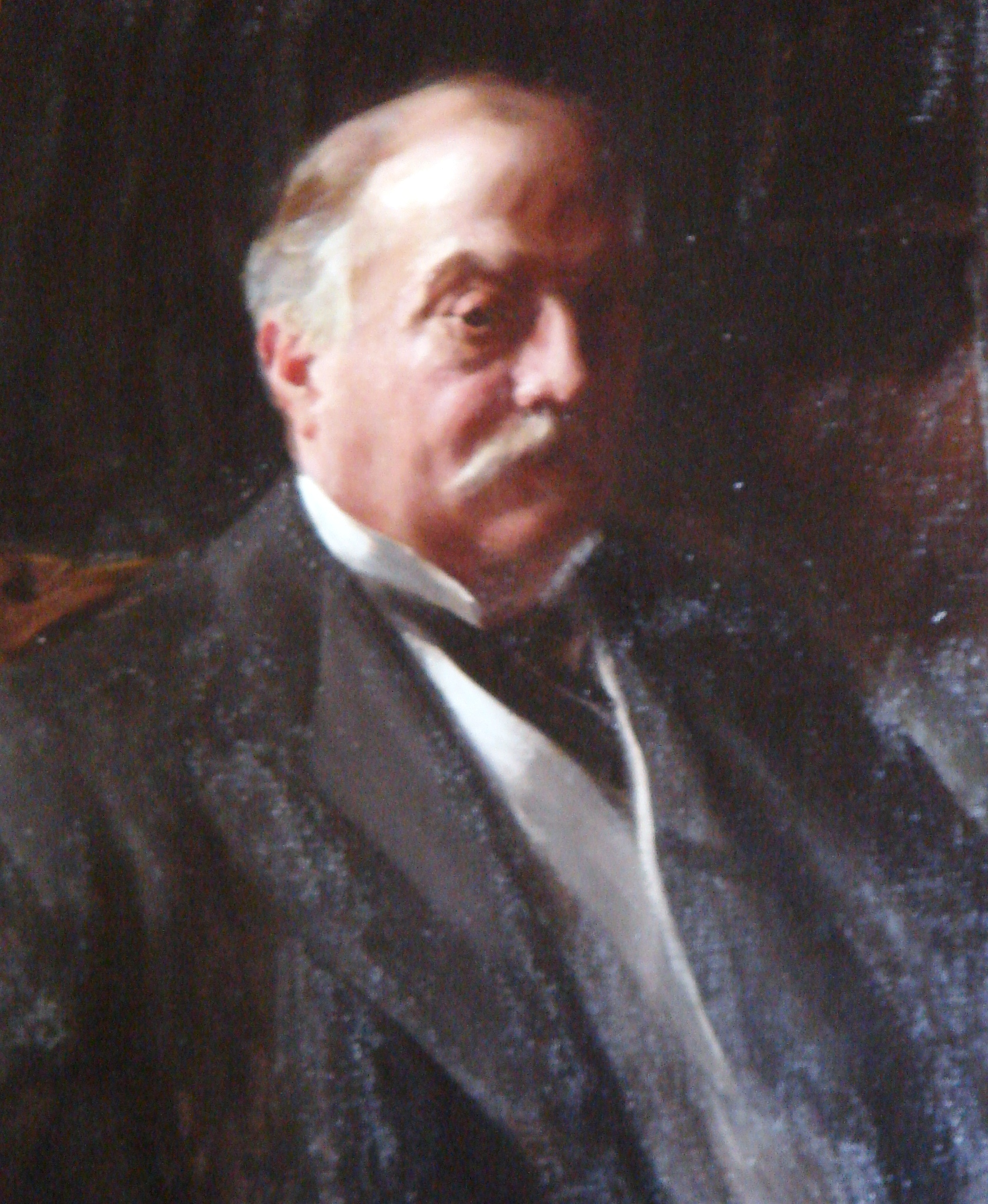
Harald Hjärne

Harald Gabriel Hjärne (2 May 1848, in Klastorp, Skövde – 6 January 1922, in Uppsala) was a Swedish historian.

Hjärne held one of the chairs of history at Uppsala University from 1889 until 1913, and was a member of the Swedish Academy 1903 - 1922. He was a member of the Second Chamber of the Riksdag 1902-1908 and of its First Chamber 1912-1918.

Cultural offices
Preceded by Carl Snoilsky	Swedish Academy; Seat No.10; 1903-22	Succeeded by Fredrik Böök
