= Per Hallström =

Swedish author, short-story writer, dramatist and poet

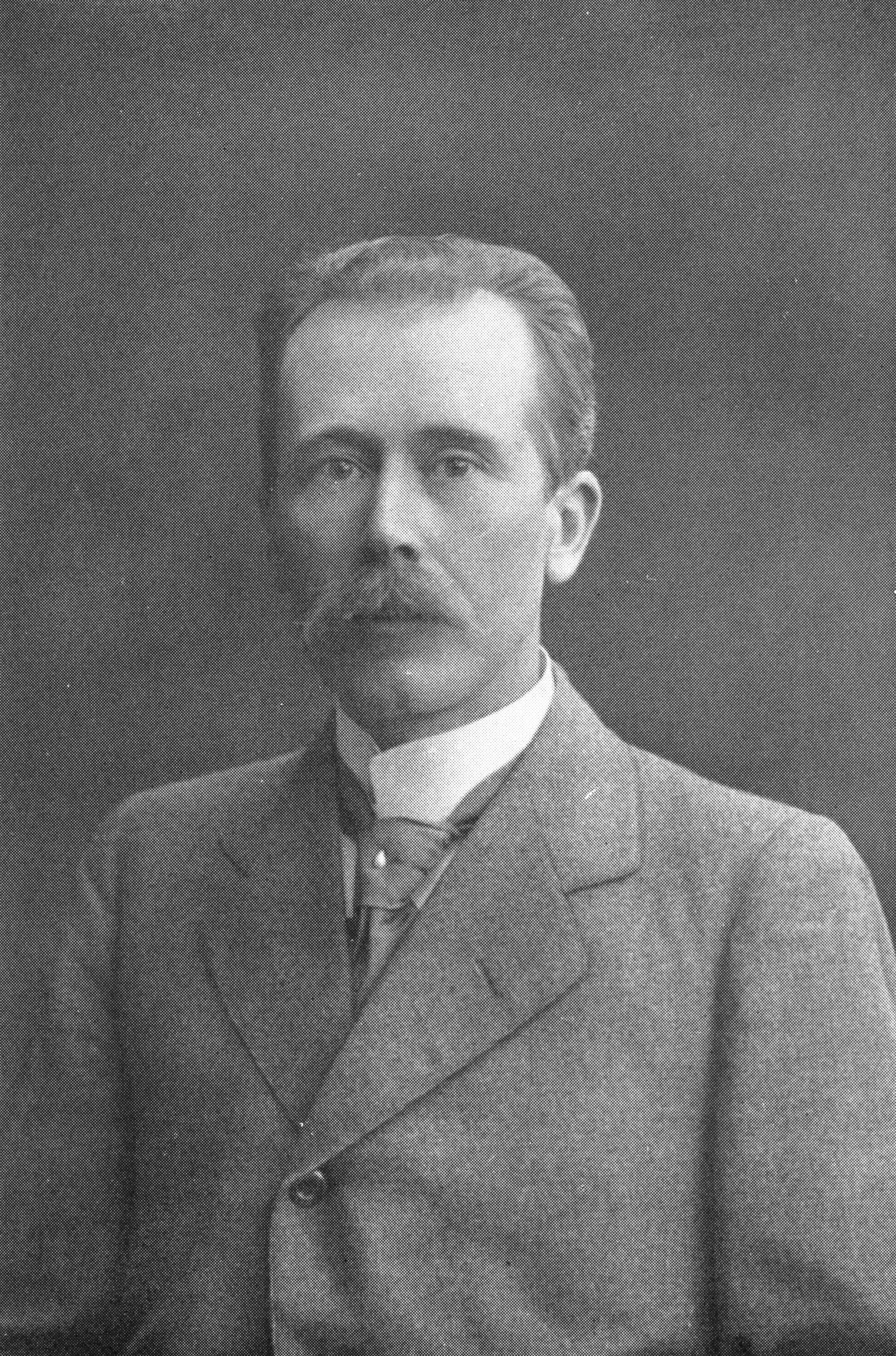
- Born: Per August Leonard Hallström; 29 September 1866; Stockholm, Sweden
- Died: 18 February 1960 (aged 93); Nacka, Sweden
- Occupations: dramatist, poet, and short story writer

Member of the Swedish Academy (Seat No. 14)
- In office 20 December 1908 – 18 February 1960
- Preceded by: Carl Rupert Nyblom
- Succeeded by: Ragnar Josephson

Permanent Secretary of the Swedish Academy
- In office April 1931 – December 1941
- Preceded by: Erik Axel Karlfeldt
- Succeeded by: Anders Österling

Per August Leonard Hallström (29 September 1866 – 18 February 1960) was a Swedish author, short-story writer, dramatist, poet and member of the Swedish Academy. He joined the academy in 1908, and served as its Permanent Secretary from 1931 to 1941.

== Life ==
Before devoting himself to writing, Hallström worked in London and Chicago as a chemist. He is appreciated primarily for his collections of short stories, such as Purpur [Purple] (1895) and Thanatos [Death] (1900). His major works, written before 1910, combine profound compassion with a sensitive awareness of beauty. Between 1922 and 1946, Hallström served as Chairman of the Nobel Committee of the Swedish Academy for the Nobel Prize in Literature.

Per was grandfather to Anders Hallström, who was also a writer.

== Selected short stories ==
"The Falcon" (April 1950), in Argosy, Australia/New Zealand edition

Cultural offices
Preceded by Carl Rupert Nyblom	Swedish Academy, Seat No.14; 1908–1960	Succeeded by Ragnar Josephson
