= Adolf Frey (writer) =

Swiss writer and literary historian

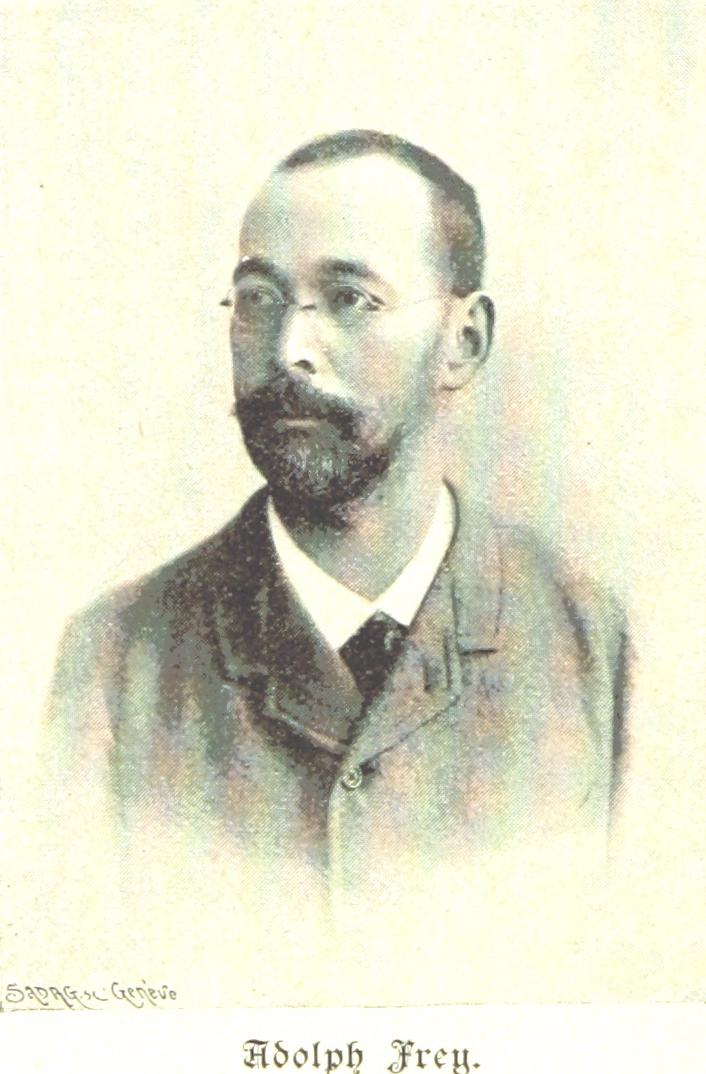

Adolf Frey (18 February 1855, Küttigen – 12 February 1920, Zurich) was a Swiss writer and literary historian. The son of popular writer Jakob Frey (1824–1875), he studied at various universities, including from 1879 to 1881 literature and history at the University of Leipzig.

In 1882, he became a German teacher at the high school in Aarau and in 1898 professor of German literature at the University of Zurich. He died at age 64, from cancer.

== Works ==
- Schweizersagen, Leipzig 1881
- Erinnerungen an Gottfried Keller, 1892
- Conrad Ferdinand Meyer, sein Leben und seine Werke, 1900
- Aus versunkenen Gärten
