= Wilhelm Oechsli =

Swiss historian

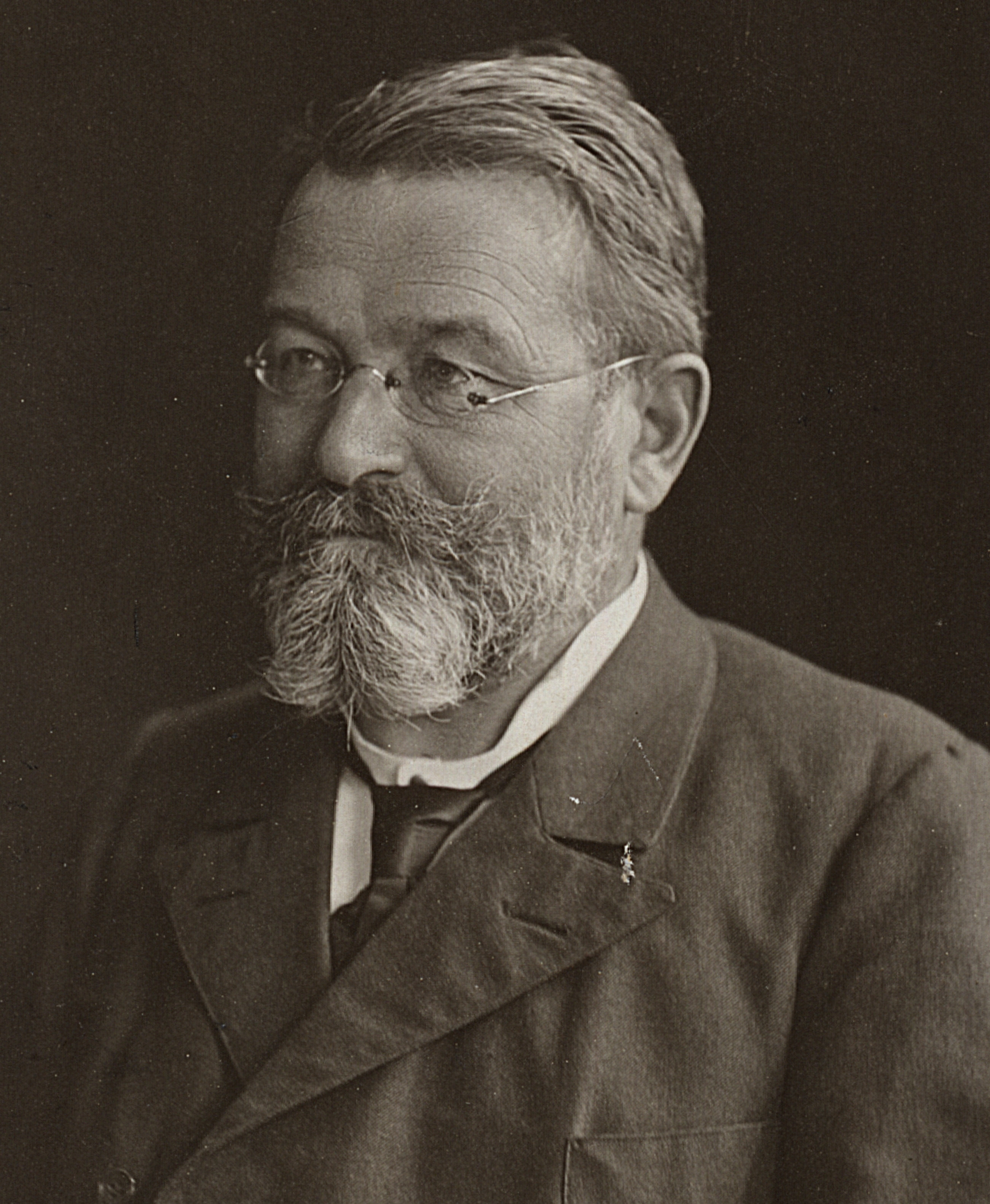
Wilhelm Oechsli

Wilhelm Oechsli (6 October 1851, Riesbach – 26 April 1919) was a Swiss historian.

Oechsli studied theology and history at Berlin and Zürich, under Theodor Mommsen among others. In 1887 he took up the new chair of Swiss history at the Swiss Federal Institute of Technology Zurich. From 1893 to 1919 he was professor of history at the University of Zürich. He tried to popularize critical historiography, challenging the legendary traditions about the Swiss national past:

However painful it may be to the Swiss to do without their Tell and their Rütli, in the field of scholarly inquiry the search for truth must prevail over any other consideration. For, as things stand today, there can be no doubt that the old and much-loved notions not only do not correspond with the sources of our national history, but also are frankly contradicted by the available sources... the legend as a whole is indeed a creation of fantasy, particularly in the form in which it was first recorded by Tschudi and subsequently adopted in the influential works of Johannes von Müller and Friedrich Schiller's Wilhelm Tell,

== Works ==
- Die Anfänge der Schweizerischen Eidgenossenschaft zur sechsten Säkularfeier des ersten ewigen Bundes vom 1. August 1291, Zürich: Ulrich, 1891.
- Geschichte der Schweiz im Neunzehnten Jahrhundert, 2 vols, Leipzig: S. Hirzel, 1903
- History of Switzerland, 1499–1914, Cambridge: Cambridge University Press, 1922. Translated from the German by Eden and Cedar Paul.
