= Fredrik Wulff =

Swedish linguist and translator (1845–1930)

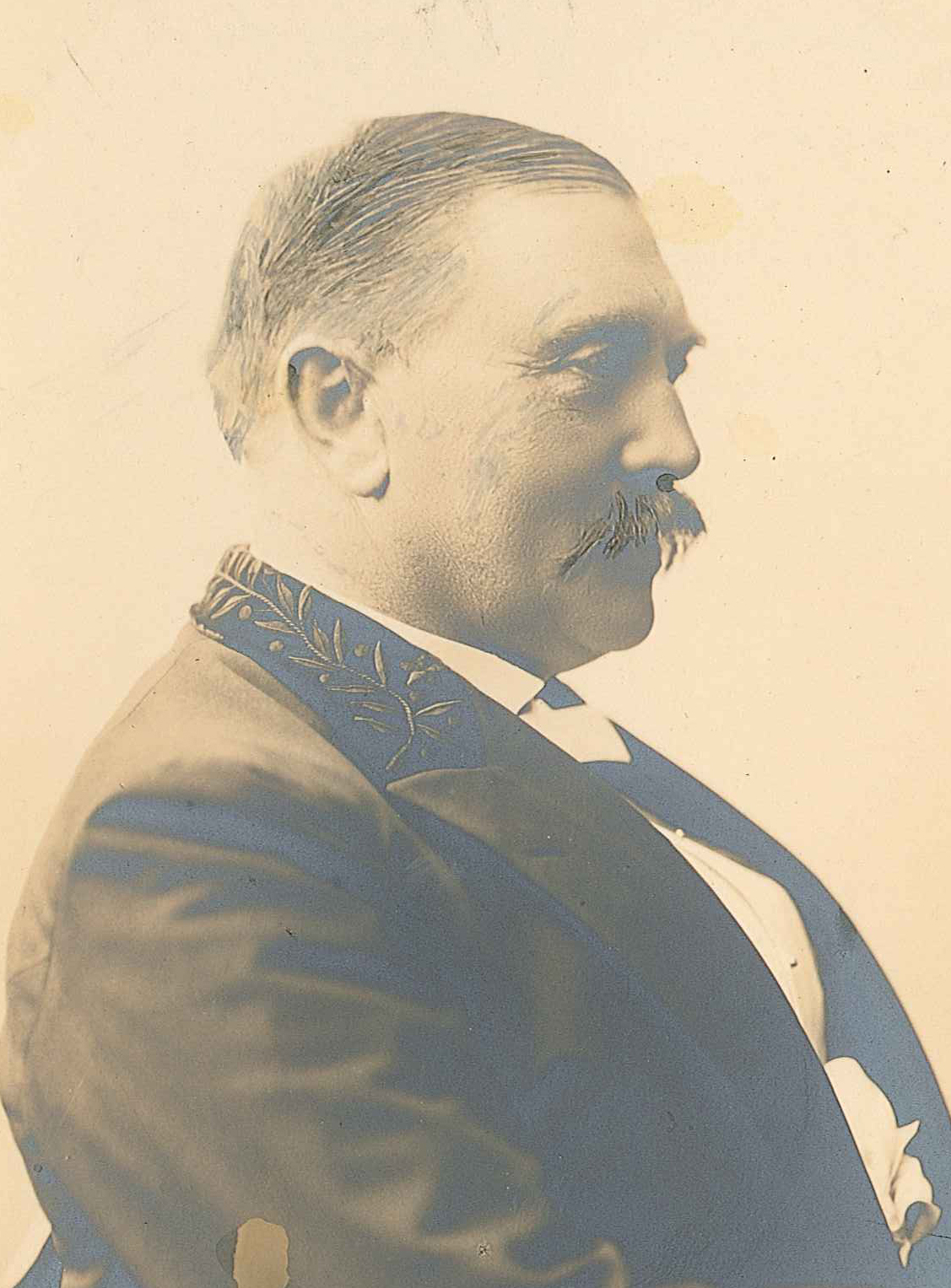
Fredrik Wulff

Fredrik Amadeus Wulff (11 February 1845 in Gothenburg – 31 December 1930 in Lund) was a Swedish phonetician and philologist. A student of Edvard Lidforss He is best known for his collaboration with Ivar Adolf Lyttkens on the pronunciation, phonology, phonotactics, and vocabulary of Swedish. Wulff became the first professor of Romance languages at the Lund University in 1888.

Wulff is buried at Easstern Cemetery, Lund.

== Gallery ==

Chart of Wulff's phonetic transcription system from 1888. Many of the symbols would end up being used by the International phonetic alphabet (IPA), but others, such as Greek τ δ ν for dental [t̪ d̪ n̪] and π μ for [p̪ m̪], would not be. Script and rotated letters would be used by the IPA, but not bold or italic typeface. This system includes a level of phonetic detail in its letters that the IPA transcribes with diacritics.
