= List of Nobel laureates in Literature =

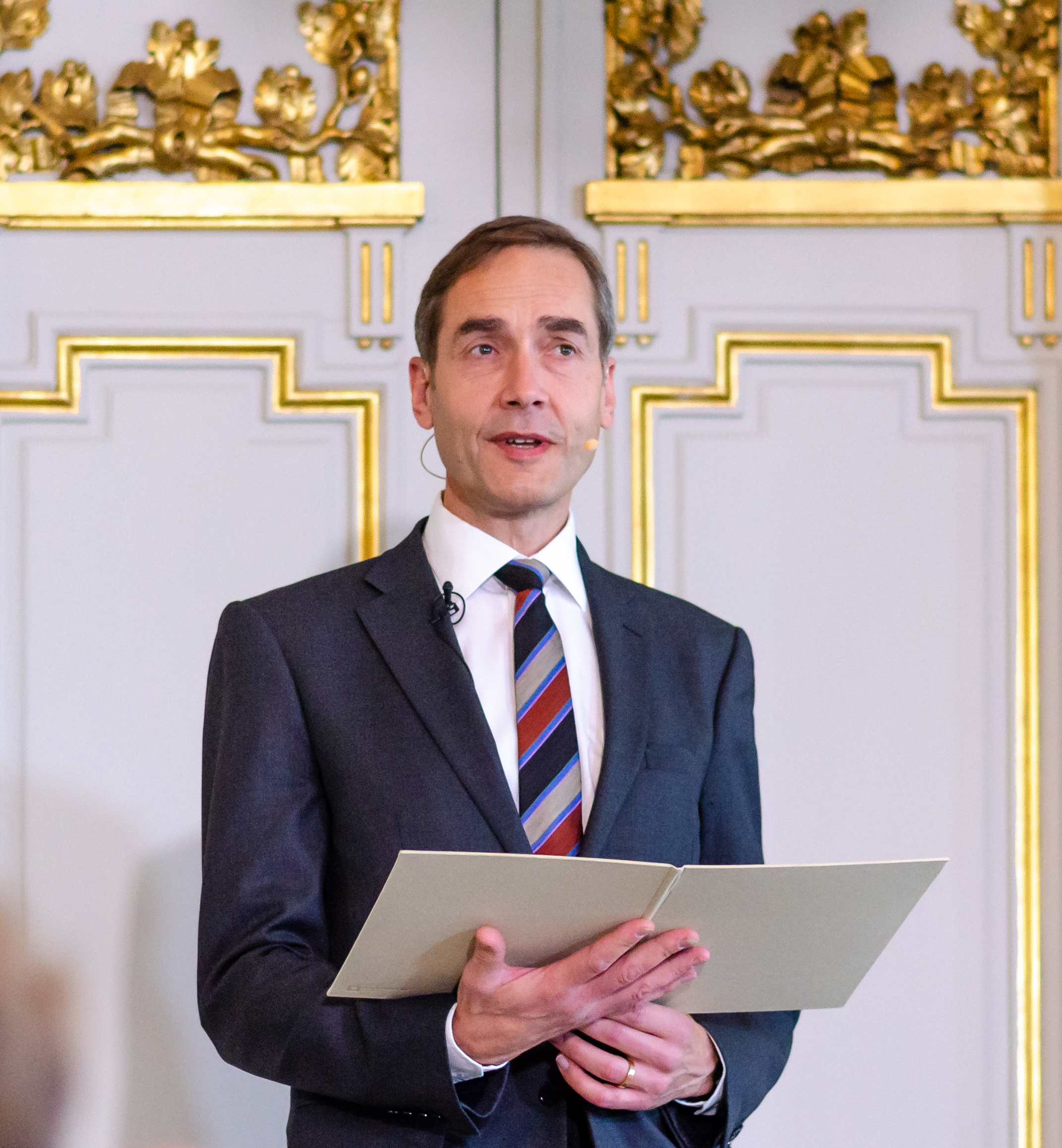
Mats Malm, permanent secretary of the Swedish Academy, announcing the 2022 Nobel Prize in Literature

The Nobel Prize in Literature (Swedish: Nobelpriset i litteratur) is awarded annually by the Swedish Academy to authors for outstanding contributions in the field of literature. It is one of the five Nobel Prizes established by the 1895 will of Alfred Nobel, which are awarded for outstanding contributions in chemistry, physics, literature, peace, and physiology or medicine. As dictated by Nobel's will, the award is administered by the Nobel Foundation and awarded by the Swedish Academy. Each recipient receives a medal, a diploma and a monetary award prize that has varied throughout the years. In 1901, the first laureate Sully Prudhomme received 150,782 SEK, which was equivalent to 8,824,000 SEK in January 2018. The award is presented in Stockholm at an annual ceremony on December 10, the anniversary of Nobel's death.

As of 2026, the Nobel Prize in Literature has been awarded to 123 individuals. 19 women have been awarded the Nobel Prize in Literature, the second highest number of any of the Nobel Prizes behind the Nobel Peace Prize. As of 2026, there have been 30 English-speaking laureates of the Nobel Prize in Literature, followed by French with 16 laureates and German with 14 laureates. France has the highest number of Nobel laureates.

== Laureates ==
Year	Image	Name	Country (Note: The information in the country column is according to nobelprize.org, the official website of the Nobel Foundation. This information may not necessarily reflect the recipient's birthplace or citizenship.) (Language)	Citation
1901		Sully Prudhomme (1839–1907)	France (French)	"in special recognition of his poetic composition, which gives evidence of lofty idealism, artistic perfection and a rare combination of the qualities of both heart and intellect"
1902		Theodor Mommsen (1817–1903)	Germany (German)	"the greatest living master of the art of historical writing, with special reference to his monumental work A History of Rome"
1903		Bjørnstjerne Bjørnson (1832–1910)	Norway (Norwegian)	"as a tribute to his noble, magnificent and versatile poetry, which has always been distinguished by both the freshness of its inspiration and the rare purity of its spirit"
1904		José Echegaray (1832–1916)	Spain (Spanish)	"in recognition of the numerous and brilliant compositions which, in an individual and original manner, have revived the great traditions of the Spanish drama"
1904		Frédéric Mistral (1830–1914)	France (French and Provençal)	"in recognition of the fresh originality and true inspiration of his poetic production, which faithfully reflects the natural scenery and native spirit of his people, and, in addition, his significant work as a Provençal philologist"
1905		Henryk Sienkiewicz (1846–1916)	Poland (Polish)	"because of his outstanding merits as an epic writer"
1906		Giosuè Carducci (1835–1907)	Italy (Italian)	"not only in consideration of his deep learning and critical research, but above all as a tribute to the creative energy, freshness of style, and lyrical force which characterize his poetic masterpieces"
1907		Rudyard Kipling (1865–1936)	United Kingdom (English)	"in consideration of the power of observation, originality of imagination, virility of ideas and remarkable talent for narration that characterize the creations of this world-famous author"
1908		Rudolf Christoph Eucken (1846–1926)	Germany (German)	"in recognition of his earnest search for truth, his penetrating power of thought, his wide range of vision, and the warmth and strength in presentation with which in his numerous works he has vindicated and developed an idealistic philosophy of life"
1909		Selma Lagerlöf (1858–1940)	Sweden (Swedish)	"in appreciation of the lofty idealism, vivid imagination and spiritual perception that characterize her writings"
1910		Paul Heyse (1830–1914)	Germany (German)	"as a tribute to the consummate artistry, permeated with idealism, which he has demonstrated during his long productive career as a lyric poet, dramatist, novelist and writer of world-renowned short stories"
1911		Maurice Maeterlinck (1862–1949)	Belgium (French)	"in appreciation of his many-sided literary activities, and especially of his dramatic works, which are distinguished by a wealth of imagination and by a poetic fancy, which reveals, sometimes in the guise of a fairy tale, a deep inspiration, while in a mysterious way they appeal to the readers' own feelings and stimulate their imaginations"
1912		Gerhart Hauptmann (1862–1946)	Germany (German)	"primarily in recognition of his fruitful, varied and outstanding production in the realm of dramatic art"
1913		Rabindranath Tagore (1861–1941)	India (British Raj) (Bengali and English)	"because of his profoundly sensitive, fresh and beautiful verse, by which, with consummate skill, he has made his poetic thought, expressed in his own English words, a part of the literature of the West"
1914	Not awarded			
1915		Romain Rolland (1866–1944)	France (French)	"as a tribute to the lofty idealism of his literary production and to the sympathy and love of truth with which he has described different types of human beings"
1916		Verner von Heidenstam (1859–1940)	Sweden (Swedish)	"in recognition of his significance as the leading representative of a new era in our literature"
1917		Karl Adolph Gjellerup (1857–1919)	Denmark (Danish and German)	"for his varied and rich poetry, which is inspired by lofty ideals"
1917		Henrik Pontoppidan (1857–1943)	Denmark (Danish)	"for his authentic descriptions of present-day life in Denmark"
1918	Not awarded			
1919		Carl Spitteler (1845–1924)	Switzerland (German)	"in special appreciation of his epic, Olympian Spring"
1920		Knut Hamsun (1859–1952)	Norway (Norwegian)	"for his monumental work, Growth of the Soil"
1921		Anatole France (1844–1924)	France (French)	"in recognition of his brilliant literary achievements, characterized as they are by a nobility of style, a profound human sympathy, grace, and a true Gallic temperament"
1922		Jacinto Benavente (1866–1954)	Spain (Spanish)	"for the happy manner in which he has continued the illustrious traditions of the Spanish drama"
1923		W. B. Yeats (1865–1939)	Ireland (English)	"for his always inspired poetry, which in a highly artistic form gives expression to the spirit of a whole nation"
1924		Władysław Reymont (1867–1925)	Poland (Polish)	"for his great national epic, The Peasants"
1925		George Bernard Shaw (1856–1950)	Ireland; United Kingdom (English)	"for his work which is marked by both idealism and humanity, its stimulating satire often being infused with a singular poetic beauty"
1926		Grazia Deledda (1871–1936)	Italy (Italian)	"for her idealistically inspired writings, which with plastic clarity picture the life on her native island and with depth and sympathy deal with human problems in general"
1927		Henri Bergson (1859–1941)	France (French)	"in recognition of his rich and vitalizing ideas and the brilliant skill with which they have been presented"
1928		Sigrid Undset (1882–1949)	Denmark; Norway (Norwegian)	"principally for her powerful descriptions of Northern life during the Middle Ages"
1929		Thomas Mann (1875–1955)	Germany (German)	"principally for his great novel, Buddenbrooks, which has won steadily increased recognition as one of the classic works of contemporary literature"
1930		Sinclair Lewis (1885–1951)	United States (English)	"for his vigorous and graphic art of description and his ability to create, with wit and humour, new types of characters"
1931		Erik Axel Karlfeldt (1864–1931)	Sweden (Swedish)	"The poetry of Erik Axel Karlfeldt"
1932		John Galsworthy (1867–1933)	United Kingdom (English)	"for his distinguished art of narration, which takes its highest form in The Forsyte Saga"
1933		Ivan Bunin (1870–1953)	Stateless (born in Russian Empire) (Russian)	"for the strict artistry with which he has carried on the classical Russian traditions in prose writing"
1934		Luigi Pirandello (1867–1936)	Italy (Italian)	"for his bold and ingenious revival of dramatic and scenic art"
1935	Not awarded			
1936		Eugene O'Neill (1888–1953)	United States (English)	"for the power, honesty and deep-felt emotions of his dramatic works, which embody an original concept of tragedy"
1937		Roger Martin du Gard (1881–1958)	France (French)	"for the artistic power and truth with which he has depicted human conflict as well as some fundamental aspects of contemporary life in his novel cycle Les Thibault"
1938		Pearl S. Buck (1892–1973)	United States (English)	"for her rich and truly epic descriptions of peasant life in China and for her biographical masterpieces"
1939		Frans Eemil Sillanpää (1888–1964)	Finland (Finnish)	"for his deep understanding of his country's peasantry and the exquisite art with which he has portrayed their way of life and their relationship with Nature"
1940	Not awarded			
1941	Not awarded			
1942	Not awarded			
1943	Not awarded			
1944		Johannes Vilhelm Jensen (1873–1950)	Denmark (Danish)	"for the rare strength and fertility of his poetic imagination with which is combined an intellectual curiosity of wide scope and a bold, freshly creative style"
1945		Gabriela Mistral (1889–1957)	Chile (Spanish)	"for her lyric poetry, which inspired by powerful emotions, has made her name a symbol of the idealistic aspirations of the entire Latin American world"
1946		Hermann Hesse (1877–1962)	Germany; Switzerland (German)	"for his inspired writings, which while growing in boldness and penetration, exemplify the classical humanitarian ideals and high qualities of style"
1947		André Gide (1869–1951)	France (French)	"for his comprehensive and artistically significant writings, in which human problems and conditions have been presented with a fearless love of truth and keen psychological insight"
1948		T. S. Eliot (1888–1965)	United Kingdom (born in the United States) (English)	"for his outstanding, pioneer contribution to present-day poetry"
1949		William Faulkner (1897–1962)	United States (English)	"for his powerful and artistically unique contribution to the modern American novel"
1950		Bertrand Russell (1872–1970)	United Kingdom (English)	"in recognition of his varied and significant writings in which he champions humanitarian ideals and freedom of thought"
1951		Pär Lagerkvist (1891–1974)	Sweden (Swedish)	"for the artistic vigour and true independence of mind with which he endeavours in his poetry to find answers to the eternal questions confronting mankind"
1952		François Mauriac (1885–1970)	France (French)	"for the deep spiritual insight and the artistic intensity with which he has in his novels penetrated the drama of human life"
1953		Winston Churchill (1874–1965)	United Kingdom (English)	"for his mastery of historical and biographical description as well as for brilliant oratory in defending exalted human values"
1954		Ernest Hemingway (1899–1961)	United States (English)	"for his mastery of the art of narrative, most recently demonstrated in The Old Man and the Sea, and for the influence that he has exerted on contemporary style"
1955		Halldór Laxness (1902–1998)	Iceland (Icelandic)	"for his vivid epic power, which has renewed the great narrative art of Iceland"
1956		Juan Ramón Jiménez (1881–1958)	Spain (Spanish)	"for his lyrical poetry, which in Spanish language constitutes an example of high spirit and artistical purity"
1957		Albert Camus (1913–1960)	France (born in French Algeria); French	"for his important literary production, which with clear-sighted earnestness illuminates the problems of the human conscience in our times"
1958		Boris Pasternak (1890–1960)	Soviet Union (Russian)	"for his important achievement both in contemporary lyrical poetry and in the field of the great Russian epic tradition"
1959		Salvatore Quasimodo (1901–1968)	Italy (Italian)	"for his lyrical poetry, which with classical fire expresses the tragic experience of life in our own times"
1960		Saint-John Perse (1887–1975)	France (born in Guadeloupe) (French)	"for the soaring flight and the evocative imagery of his poetry, which in a visionary fashion reflects the conditions of our time"
1961		Ivo Andrić (1892–1975)	Yugoslavia (born in Austria-Hungary) (Serbo-Croatian)	"for the epic force with which he has traced themes and depicted human destinies drawn from the history of his country"
1962		John Steinbeck (1902–1968)	United States (English)	"for his realistic and imaginative writings, combining as they do sympathetic humour and keen social perception"
1963		Giorgos Seferis (1900–1971)	Greece (born in the Ottoman Empire) (Greek)	"for his eminent lyrical writing, inspired by a deep feeling for the Hellenic world of culture"
1964		Jean-Paul Sartre (1905–1980)	France (French)	"for his work, which rich in ideas and filled with the spirit of freedom and the quest for truth, has exerted a far-reaching influence on our age"
1965		Mikhail Sholokhov (1905–1984)	Soviet Union (Russian)	"for the artistic power and integrity with which, in his epic of the Don, he has given expression to a historic phase in the life of the Russian people"
1966		Shmuel Yosef Agnon (1888–1970)	Israel (born in Austria-Hungary) (Hebrew)	"for his profoundly characteristic narrative art with motifs from the life of the Jewish people"
1966		Nelly Sachs (1891–1970)	Sweden; West Germany (German)	"for her outstanding lyrical and dramatic writing, which interprets Israel's destiny with touching strength"
1967		Miguel Ángel Asturias (1899–1974)	Guatemala (Spanish)	"for his vivid literary achievement, deep-rooted in the national traits and traditions of Indian peoples of Latin America"
1968		Yasunari Kawabata (1899–1972)	Japan (Japanese)	"for his narrative mastery, which with great sensibility expresses the essence of the Japanese mind"
1969		Samuel Beckett (1906–1989)	Ireland (French and English)	"for his writing, which – in new forms for the novel and drama – in the destitution of modern man acquires its elevation"
1970		Aleksandr Solzhenitsyn (1918–2008)	Soviet Union (Russian)	"for the ethical force with which he has pursued the indispensable traditions of Russian literature"
1971		Pablo Neruda (1904–1973)	Chile (Spanish)	"for a poetry that with the action of an elemental force brings alive a continent's destiny and dreams"
1972		Heinrich Böll (1917–1985)	West Germany (German)	"for his writing, which through its combination of a broad perspective on his time and a sensitive skill in characterization has contributed to a renewal of German literature"
1973		Patrick White (1912–1990)	Australia (born in the United Kingdom) (English)	"for an epic and psychological narrative art, which has introduced a new continent into literature"
1974		Eyvind Johnson (1900–1976)	Sweden (Swedish)	"for a narrative art, farseeing in lands and ages, in the service of freedom"
1974		Harry Martinson (1904–1978)	Sweden (Swedish)	"for writings that catch the dewdrop and reflect the cosmos"
1975		Eugenio Montale (1896–1981)	Italy (Italian)	"for his distinctive poetry, which, with great artistic sensitivity, has interpreted human values under the sign of an outlook on life with no illusions"
1976		Saul Bellow (1915–2005)	Canada; United States (English)	"for the human understanding and subtle analysis of contemporary culture that are combined in his work"
1977		Vicente Aleixandre (1898–1984)	Spain (Spanish)	"for a creative poetic writing, which illuminates man's condition in the cosmos and in present-day society, at the same time representing the great renewal of the traditions of Spanish poetry between the wars"
1978		Isaac Bashevis Singer (1902–1991)	Poland; United States (Yiddish)	"for his impassioned narrative art which, with roots in a Polish-Jewish cultural tradition, brings universal human conditions to life"
1979		Odysseas Elytis (1911–1996)	Greece (Greek)	"for his poetry, which, against the background of Greek tradition, depicts with sensuous strength and intellectual clear-sightedness modern man's struggle for freedom and creativeness"
1980		Czesław Miłosz (1911–2004)	Poland (Polish)	"who with uncompromising clear-sightedness voices man's exposed condition in a world of severe conflicts"
1981		Elias Canetti (1905–1994)	Bulgaria; United Kingdom (German)	"for writings marked by a broad outlook, a wealth of ideas and artistic power"
1982		Gabriel García Márquez (1927–2014)	Colombia (Spanish)	"for his novels and short stories, in which the fantastic and the realistic are combined in a richly composed world of imagination, reflecting a continent's life and conflicts"
1983		William Golding (1911–1993)	United Kingdom (English)	"for his novels, which with the perspicuity of realistic narrative art and the diversity and universality of myth, illuminate the human condition in the world of today"
1984		Jaroslav Seifert (1901–1986)	Czechoslovakia (born in Austria-Hungary) (Czech)	"for his poetry, which endowed with freshness, and rich inventiveness provides a liberating image of the indomitable spirit and versatility of man"
1985		Claude Simon (1913–2005)	France (born in French Madagascar) (French)	"who in his novel combines the poet's and the painter's creativeness with a deepened awareness of time in the depiction of the human condition"
1986		Wole Soyinka (1934–present)	Nigeria (English)	"who in a wide cultural perspective and with poetic overtones fashions the drama of existence"
1987		Joseph Brodsky (1940–1996)	Soviet Union; United States (Russian and English)	"for an all-embracing authorship, imbued with clarity of thought and poetic intensity"
1988		Naguib Mahfouz (1911–2006)	Egypt (Arabic)	"who, through works rich in nuance – now clear-sightedly realistic, now evocatively ambiguous – has formed an Arabian narrative art that applies to all mankind"
1989		Camilo José Cela (1916–2002)	Spain (Spanish)	"for a rich and intensive prose, which with restrained compassion forms a challenging vision of man's vulnerability"
1990		Octavio Paz (1914–1998)	Mexico (Spanish)	"for impassioned writing with wide horizons, characterized by sensuous intelligence and humanistic integrity"
1991		Nadine Gordimer (1923–2014)	South Africa (English)	"who through her magnificent epic writing has – in the words of Alfred Nobel – been of very great benefit to humanity"
1992		Derek Walcott (1930–2017)	Saint Lucia (English)	"for a poetic oeuvre of great luminosity, sustained by a historical vision, the outcome of a multicultural commitment"
1993		Toni Morrison (1931–2019)	United States (English)	"who in novels characterized by visionary force and poetic import, gives life to an essential aspect of American reality"
1994		Kenzaburō Ōe (1935–2023)	Japan (Japanese)	"who with poetic force creates an imagined world, where life and myth condense to form a disconcerting picture of the human predicament today"
1995		Seamus Heaney (1939–2013)	Ireland (English)	"for works of lyrical beauty and ethical depth, which exalt everyday miracles and the living past"
1996		Wisława Szymborska (1923–2012)	Poland (Polish)	"for poetry that with ironic precision allows the historical and biological context to come to light in fragments of human reality"
1997		Dario Fo (1926–2016)	Italy (Italian)	"who emulates the jesters of the Middle Ages in scourging authority and upholding the dignity of the downtrodden"
1998		José Saramago (1922–2010)	Portugal (Portuguese)	"who with parables sustained by imagination, compassion and irony continually enables us once again to apprehend an elusory reality"
1999		Günter Grass (1927–2015)	Germany (born in Free City of Danzig) (German)	"whose frolicsome black fables portray the forgotten face of history"
2000		Gao Xingjian (1940–present)	(Taiwan) China; France (Chinese and French)	"for an oeuvre of universal validity, bitter insights and linguistic ingenuity, which has opened new paths for the Chinese novel and drama"
2001		V. S. Naipaul (1932–2018)	Trinidad and Tobago; United Kingdom (English)	"for having united perceptive narrative and incorruptible scrutiny in works that compel us to see the presence of suppressed histories"
2002		Imre Kertész (1929–2016)	Hungary (Hungarian)	"for writing that upholds the fragile experience of the individual against the barbaric arbitrariness of history"
2003		J. M. Coetzee (1940–present)	South Africa (English)	"who in innumerable guises portrays the surprising involvement of the outsider"
2004		Elfriede Jelinek (1946–present)	Austria (German)	"for her musical flow of voices and counter-voices in novels and plays that with extraordinary linguistic zeal reveal the absurdity of society's clichés and their subjugating power"
2005		Harold Pinter (1930–2008)	United Kingdom (English)	"who in his plays uncovers the precipice under everyday prattle and forces entry into oppression's closed rooms"
2006		Orhan Pamuk (1952–present)	Turkey (Turkish)	"who in the quest for the melancholic soul of his native city has discovered new symbols for the clash and interlacing of cultures"
2007		Doris Lessing (1919–2013)	United Kingdom (born in Iran) (English)	"that epicist of the female experience, who with scepticism, fire and visionary power has subjected a divided civilisation to scrutiny"
2008		J. M. G. Le Clézio (1940–present)	France; Mauritius (French)	"author of new departures, poetic adventure and sensual ecstasy, explorer of a humanity beyond and below the reigning civilization"
2009		Herta Müller (1953–present)	Germany; Romania (German)	"who, with the concentration of poetry and the frankness of prose, depicts the landscape of the dispossessed"
2010		Mario Vargas Llosa (1936–2025)	Peru; Spain (Spanish)	"for his cartography of structures of power and his trenchant images of the individual's resistance, revolt, and defeat"
2011		Tomas Tranströmer (1931–2015)	Sweden (Swedish)	"because, through his condensed, translucent images, he gives us fresh access to reality"
2012		Mo Yan (1955–present)	China (Chinese)	"who with hallucinatory realism merges folk tales, history and the contemporary"
2013		Alice Munro (1931–2024)	Canada (English)	"master of the contemporary short story"
2014		Patrick Modiano (1945–present)	France (French)	"for the art of memory with which he has evoked the most ungraspable human destinies and uncovered the life-world of the Occupation"
2015		Svetlana Alexievich (1948–present)	Belarus (born in Soviet Ukraine) (Russian)	"for her polyphonic writings, a monument to suffering and courage in our time"
2016		Bob Dylan (1941–present)	United States (English)	"for having created new poetic expressions within the great American song tradition"
2017		Kazuo Ishiguro (1954–present)	United Kingdom (born in Japan) (English)	"who, in novels of great emotional force, has uncovered the abyss beneath our illusory sense of connection with the world"
2018		Olga Tokarczuk (1962–present)	Poland (Polish)	"for a narrative imagination that with encyclopedic passion represents the crossing of boundaries as a form of life"
2019		Peter Handke (1942–present)	Austria (German)	"for an influential work that with linguistic ingenuity has explored the periphery and the specificity of human experience"
2020		Louise Glück (1943–2023)	United States (English)	"for her unmistakable poetic voice that with austere beauty makes individual existence universal"
2021		Abdulrazak Gurnah (1948–present)	Tanzania; United Kingdom (born in the Sultanate of Zanzibar) (English)	"for his uncompromising and compassionate penetration of the effects of colonialism and the fate of the refugee in the gulf between cultures and continents"
2022		Annie Ernaux (1940–present)	France (French)	"for the courage and clinical acuity with which she uncovers the roots, estrangements and collective restraints of personal memory"
2023		Jon Fosse (1959–present)	Norway (Norwegian)	"for his innovative plays and prose which give voice to the unsayable"
2024		Han Kang (1970–present)	South Korea (Korean)	"for her intense poetic prose that confronts historical traumas and exposes the fragility of human life"
2025		László Krasznahorkai (1954–present)	Hungary (Hungarian)	"for his compelling and visionary oeuvre that, in the midst of apocalyptic terror, reaffirms the power of art"
2026		Anne Carson (1950–present)	Canada; Iceland (English)	"for her bold and inventive oeuvre that, in playful dialogue with the classical tradition, has created new forms for contemporary literature"

== Nobel laureates by country ==
The 122 Nobel laureates in literature from 1901 to 2026 came from the following countries:

Country	Number
France	16
United Kingdom	13
United States	12
Germany	9
Sweden	8
Poland	6
Spain	6
Italy	6
Russia/USSR	5
Ireland	4
Norway	4
Canada	3
Denmark	3
Austria	2
Chile	2
Greece	2
Hungary	2
Iceland	2
Japan	2
South Africa	2
Switzerland	2
China	2
Australia	1
Belarus	1
Belgium	1
Bulgaria	1
Colombia	1
Czechoslovakia	1
Egypt	1
Finland	1
Guatemala	1
India	1
Israel	1
Mauritius	1
Mexico	1
Nigeria	1
Peru	1
Portugal	1
Romania	1
Saint Lucia	1
South Korea	1
Tanzania	1
Turkey	1
Yugoslavia	1

== Nobel laureates by language ==
The 122 Nobel laureates in literature from 1901 to 2025 wrote in the following languages:

Language	Number
English	29 (32) (Note: Rabindranath Tagore (Nobel Prize in Literature 1913) wrote in Bengali and English, Samuel Beckett (Nobel Prize in Literature 1969) wrote in French and English and Joseph Brodsky (Nobel Prize in Literature 1987) wrote poetry in Russian and prose in English. These three Nobel laureates have been sorted under Bengali, French and Russian, respectively.)
French	16
German	14 (15) (Note: Karl Adolph Gjellerup (Nobel Prize in Literature 1917) wrote in Danish and German.)
Spanish	11
Swedish	7
Italian	6
Russian	6
Polish	5
Norwegian	4
Danish	3
Chinese	2
Greek	2
Hungarian	2
Japanese	2
Arabic	1
Bengali	1
Czech	1
Finnish	1
Hebrew	1
Icelandic	1
Korean	1
Provençal (Occitan)	1
Portuguese	1
Serbo-Croatian	1
Turkish	1
Yiddish	1

== Nobel laureates by gender ==
The 123 Nobel laureates in literature from 1901 to 2026 were from the following genders:

Decade	Male	Female
1900–1909	9	1
1910–1919	9	0
1920–1929	8	2
1930–1939	8	1
1940–1949	5	1
1950–1959	10	0
1960–1969	10	1
1970–1979	11	0
1980–1989	10	0
1990–1999	7	3
2000–2009	7	3
2010–2019	7	3
2020–2026	3	4
Total	104	18
