= 1949 Nobel Prize in Literature =

- William Faulkner
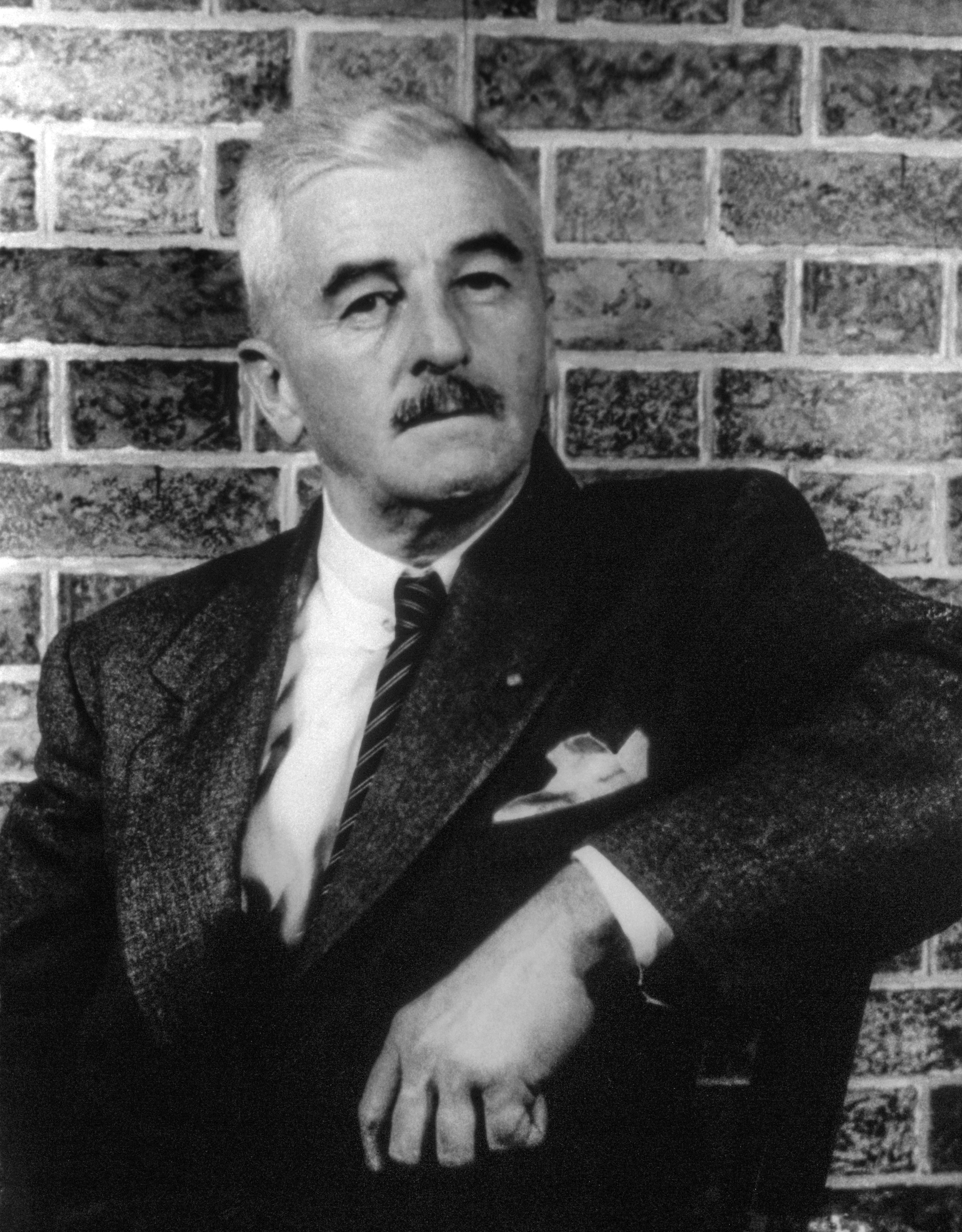
- "for his powerful and artistically unique contribution to the modern American novel."
- Date: 3 November 1949 (Note: The Swedish Academy decided on 3rd November 1949 that this year's Nobel Prize in Literature would be reserved for the following year.) (postponement); 10 November 1950 (announcement); 10 December 1950 (ceremony)
- Location: Stockholm, Sweden
- Presented by: Swedish Academy
- First award: 1901
- Website: Official website

The 1949 Nobel Prize in Literature was awarded to the American novelist and short story writer William Faulkner (1897–1962) "for his powerful and artistically unique contribution to the modern American novel." The prize was awarded the following year in October 1950. The Nobel Committee for Literature had decided that none of the nominations for 1949 met the criteria as outlined in the will of Alfred Nobel, and the prize was reserved until the following year.

== Laureate ==
William Faulkner generally is regarded as one of the most significant American writers of all time. Faulkner wrote 13 novels and many short stories but started as a poet. With his breakthrough novel, The Sound and the Fury (1929), he began to use stream of consciousness to portray a character's flow of inner thoughts. His books often are told from the point of view of several characters and contain accurately rendered colloquialisms combined with long sentences full of imagery and language that is sometimes surreal. Among his other famous works include As I Lay Dying (1930), Light In August (1934) and Absalom! Absalom! (1936).

== Deliberations ==
=== Nominations ===
William Faulkner was not nominated for the prize in 1949, but he was nominated the following year and in 1950 the Swedish Academy decided to award Faulkner the Nobel Prize in Literature for 1949. Faulkner was nominated by Prince Wilhelm, Duke of Södermanland who became the president of the Swedish PEN Centre. Faulkner had not been nominated for the prize before, making it a rare occasion when an author have been awarded the Nobel Prize in Literature the same year they were first nominated.

In total, the Nobel Committee received 43 nominations for authors such as Benedetto Croce, Thornton Wilder, Winston Churchill (awarded in 1953), François Mauriac (awarded in 1952), Carl Sandburg, Georges Duhamel, and Pär Lagerkvist (awarded in 1951). 9 of the nominees were nominated first-time among them Albert Camus (awarded in 1957), Leonid Leonov, Enrique González Martínez, Alfonso Reyes, Taha Hussein, and Alberto Moravia. Three of the nominees were women: Marie Under, Henriette Charasson, and Dorothy Canfield Fisher.

The authors James Truslow Adams, Hervey Allen, Chairil Anwar, Rex Beach, Elsa Bernstein, Maurice Blondel, Jacques Copeau, Will Cuppy, Lucien Descaves, Ali Douagi, William Price Drury, Inés Echeverría Bello, Herbert Eulenberg, Martin Grabmann, Yaroslav Halan, Edmond Jaloux, Klaus Mann, Sarojini Naidu, Elin Pelin, Gustav Radbruch, Alexander Serafimovich, George Shiels, Elin Wägner, and Oton Župančič died in 1949 without having been nominated for the prize.

Official list of nominees and their nominators for the prize
No.	Nominee	Country	Genre(s)	Nominator(s)
1	Shmuel Yosef Agnon (1887–1970)	Israel	novel, short story	Hugo Bergmann (1883–1975)
2	Mark Aldanov (1886–1957)	Soviet Union (Ukraine); France	biography, novel, essays, literary criticism	Ivan Bunin (1870–1953)
3	Riccardo Bacchelli (1891–1985)	Italy	novel, drama, essays	Thomas Stearns Eliot (1888–1965); Accademia dei Lincei
4	Eugène Baie (1874–1964)	Belgium	law, essays	Maurice Maeterlinck (1862–1949)
5	Albert Camus (1913–1960)	France	novel, short story, essays, philosophy, drama	Hjalmar Gullberg (1898–1961)
6	Dorothy Canfield Fisher (1879–1958)	United States	novel, short story, pedagogy, essays	David Baumgardt (1890–1963)
7	Hans Carossa (1878–1956)	Germany	poetry, autobiography, essays	Henry Olsson (1896–1985)
8	Henriette Charasson (1884–1972)	France	poetry, essays, drama, novel, literary criticism, biography	Serge Barrault (1887–1976)
9	Winston Churchill (1874–1965)	United Kingdom	history, essays, memoir	Nils Ahnlund (1889–1957); Birger Nerman (1888–1971)
10	Benedetto Croce (1866–1952)	Italy	history, philosophy, law	Fritz Strich (1882–1963); Accademia dei Lincei
11	Georges Duhamel (1884–1966)	France	novel, short story, poetry, drama, literary criticism	Martin Lamm (1880–1950); Hjalmar Hammarskjöld (1862–1953)
12	Johan Falkberget (1879–1967)	Norway	novel, short story, essays	Richard Beck (1897–1980); Andreas Hofgaard Winsnes (1889–1972)
13	Enrique González Martínez (1871–1952)	Mexico	poetry	Antonio Castro Leal (1896–1981)
14	Jacinto Grau Delgado (1877–1958)	Spain	drama, essays, short story, literary criticism	Hjalmar Gullberg (1898–1961)
15	Taha Hussein (1889–1973)	Egypt	novel, short story, poetry, translation	Ahmed Lutfi el-Sayed (1872–1963) (Note: Several other members of the King Fuad I University also nominated Taha Hussein.)
16	Pär Lagerkvist (1891–1974)	Sweden	poetry, novel, short story, drama	Erik Ekelund (1897–1976)
17	Halldór Laxness (1902–1998)	Iceland	novel, short story, drama, poetry	Jón Helgason (1899–1986)
18	Leonid Leonov (1899–1994)	Soviet Union	drama, novel, short story	Valentin Kiparsky (1904–1983)
19	André Malraux (1901–1976)	France	novel, essays, literary criticism	Martin Lamm (1880–1950)
20	François Mauriac (1885–1970)	France	novel, short story	Henri Peyre (1901–1988); Gustaf Hellström (1882–1953)
21	Ramón Menéndez Pidal (1869–1968)	Spain	philology, history	Gunnar Tilander (1894–1973)
22	Alberto Moravia (1907–1990)	Italy	novel, literary criticism, essays, drama	Hjalmar Gullberg (1898–1961)
23	Charles Langbridge Morgan (1894–1958)	United Kingdom	drama, novel, essays, poetry	Elias Wessén (1889–1981)
24	Seán O'Casey (1880–1964)	Ireland	drama, memoir	Oscar Wieselgren (1886–1971)
25	Arnulf Øverland (1889–1968)	Norway	poetry, essays	Martin Lamm (1880–1950); Lorentz Eckhoff (1884–1974); Harry Fett (1875–1962)
26	Boris Pasternak (1890–1960)	Soviet Union	poetry, novel, translation	Maurice Bowra (1898–1971)
27	Alfonso Reyes Ochoa (1889–1959)	Mexico	philosophy, essays, novel, poetry	Gabriela Mistral (1889–1957) (Note: Other nominations were made of Alfonso Reyes.)
28	Carl Sandburg (1878–1967)	United States	poetry, essays, biography	Einar Tegen (1884–1965)
29	George Santayana (1863–1952)	Spain; United States	philosophy, essays, poetry, novel	Giuseppe Antonio Borgese (1882–1952)
30	Mikhail Sholokhov (1905–1984)	Soviet Union	novel	Valentin Kiparsky (1904–1983)
31	Angelos Sikelianos (1884–1951)	Greece	poetry, drama	Sigfrid Siwertz (1882–1970)
32	John Steinbeck (1902–1968)	United States	novel, short story, screenplay	Henri Peyre (1901–1988)
33	Reinaldo Temprano Azcona (1911–1954)	Spain	essays	Emilio Alarcos García (1895–1986)
34	Marie Under (1883–1980)	Soviet Union (Estonia)	poetry	Hjalmar Hammarskjöld (1862–1953)
35	Thornton Wilder (1897–1975)	United States	drama, novel, short story	Yngve Brilioth (1891–1959)

=== Prize decision ===
On 3 November 1949 the Swedish Academy announced that no Nobel Prize in Literature would be awarded that year: "No Nobel Prize in Literature will be awarded this year. And the justification, in short, is that none of this year's candidates has been able to gather the absolute majority required according to the statutes for the prize to be awarded. For the time being, two literature prizes are therefore at the Academy's disposal next year. In 1918 and 1935 the same measure was taken on the same grounds."

Considered candidates for the 1949 prize included the French novelist Georges Duhamel and the Greek writer Angelos Sikelianos, but none of them received any strong support from the members of the Nobel committee. The German writer Hans Carossa were also mentioned as a possible candidate. The 83 year old Italian philosopher Benedetto Croce's candidacy was dismissed because of his advanced age, while the 35 year old Albert Camus were thought too young to be considered a candidate for the 1949 prize. Pär Lagerkvist who had some support in Nobel committee and eventually was awarded the 1951 Nobel Prize in Literature had in 1949 declined to be considered for the prize.

The Academy awarded the prize for 1949 the following year to William Faulkner, while Bertrand Russell was awarded the 1950 Nobel Prize in Literature. Faulkner's candidacy for the prize was launched by Academy member Gustaf Hellström who in a report praised Faulkner's "narrative genius" and called him "for the time being, one of the fore-most figures not only in the American novel but in English fiction in general". Nobel committee chairman Anders Österling had doubts that Faulkner's "deeply depressing themes" met “the demand of a consolatory or in some way positive view of life which was in all likelihood intended in the [by donor Alfred Nobel] guidelines of an idealistic direction", but concluded that "his artistic integrity is so strong and original that one finally hesitates to apply such a measurement to his novels". Faulkner's candidacy was not fully supported by the 1950 Nobel committee, but won the majority of the votes from the members of the Swedish Academy and Faulkner was awarded the Nobel Prize in Literature for 1949.

== Award ceremony speech ==
In his award ceremony speech on 10 December 1950, Gustaf Hellström, member of the Swedish Academy, said of Faulkner:

As a probing psychologist he is the unrivalled master among all living British and American novelists. Neither do any of his colleagues possess his fantastic imaginative powers and his ability to create characters. His subhuman and superhuman figures, tragic or comic in a macabre way, emerge from his mind with a reality that few existing people – even those nearest to us – can give us [...] Moreover – side by side with Joyce and perhaps even more so – Faulkner is the great experimentalist among twentieth-century novelists. Scarcely two of his novels are similar technically. It seems as if by this continuous renewal he wanted to achieve the increased breadth which his limited world, both in geography and in subject matter, cannot give him. The same desire to experiment is shown in his mastery, unrivalled among modern British and American novelists, of the richness of the English language, a richness derived from its different linguistic elements and the periodic changes in style – from the spirit of the Elizabethans down to the scanty but expressive vocabulary of the Negroes of the southern states.

== Acceptance speech ==
At the banquet, Faulkner read his acceptance speech, which he ended with an affirmation of faith:

I believe that man will not merely endure: he will prevail. He is immortal, not because he alone among creatures has an inexhaustible voice, but because he has a soul, a spirit capable of compassion and sacrifice and endurance.

The speech was later made available in print.

== Reactions ==
The choice of William Faulkner as the Nobel Prize Laureate was well received. Faulkner himself at first refused to travel to Sweden to accept the award, but was persuaded by friends and his wife to travel. At the banquet in Stockholm on 10 December 1950 he held a memorable acceptance speech. Faulkner eventually gave away the prize money in scholarships and other bequests.
