= 1957 Nobel Prize in Literature =

- Albert Camus
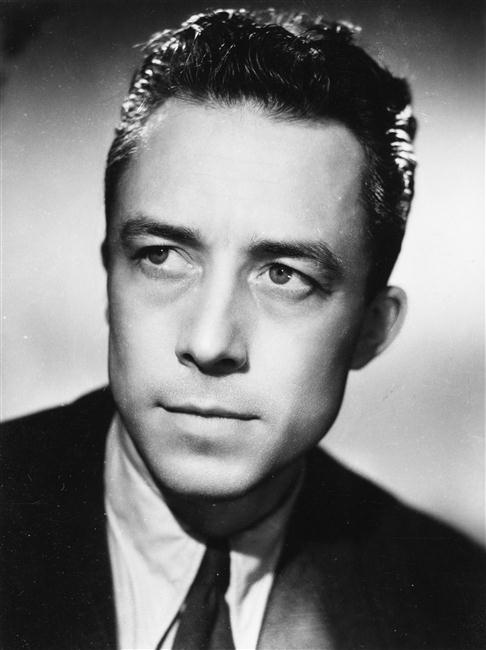
- "for his important literary production, which with clear-sighted earnestness illuminates the problems of the human conscience in our times."
- Date: 17 October 1957 (announcement); 10 December 1957 (ceremony)
- Location: Stockholm
- Country: Sweden
- Presented by: Swedish Academy
- First award: 1901
- Website: Official website

The 1957 Nobel Prize in Literature was awarded the French writer Albert Camus (1913–1960) "for his important literary production, which with clear-sighted earnestness illuminates the problems of the human conscience in our times." He is the ninth French author to become a recipient of the prize after Catholic novelist François Mauriac in 1952, and the fourth philosopher after British analytic philosopher Bertrand Russell in 1950.

Aged 44 when he received the prize, Camus is the second youngest recipient of the Nobel Prize in Literature, after only Rudyard Kipling (41).

== Laureate ==
Camus made his debut as a writer in 1937, but his breakthrough came with the novel L’étranger ("The Stranger"), published in 1942. It concerns the absurdity of life, a theme he returns to in other books, including his philosophical work Le mythe de Sisyphe ("The Myth of Sisyphus", 1942). He also worked as a journalist and playwright with Caligula (1944), which received praises from theatre critics. Because of his friendship with Jean-Paul Sartre, Camus was labeled an existentialist, but he preferred not to be linked with any ideology. His other successful novels include La peste ("The Plague", 1947), La chute ("The Fall", 1956), and an unfinished autobiography, Le Premier homme ("The First Man"), was published posthumously.

== Deliberations ==
=== Nominations ===
Albert Camus was nominated for the Nobel Prize in literature on 11 occasions, the first time in 1949. He was nominated once in 1957 by a French professor of Anglo-Saxon language and literature from the Caen University, which he was awarded afterwards.

In total, the Nobel committee received 66 nominations for 49 writers including Nikos Kazantzakis, E. M. Forster, Alberto Moravia, Georges Duhamel, Jules Romains, Ezra Pound, Saint-John Perse (awarded in 1960), Carlo Levi, Boris Pasternak (awarded in 1958) and Robert Frost. 12 of the nominees were nominated first-time among them Jean-Paul Sartre (awarded in 1964), Lennox Robinson, Jan Parandowski, Samuel Beckett (awarded in 1969), Jarosław Iwaszkiewicz, André Chamson, Väinö Linna and Carlo Levi. The nominee with the highest number of nominations – 4 nominations – was for André Malraux. Four of the nominees were women namely Gertrud von Le Fort, Karen Blixen, Henriette Charasson, and Maria Dąbrowska.

The authors Nurullah Ataç, Erich Auerbach, Arturo Barea, Ernst Bertram, Roy Campbell, Joyce Cary, José Lins do Rego, Alfred Döblin, Claude Farrère, Peter Freuchen, Rose Fyleman, Oliver St. John Gogarty, Sacha Guitry, Laura Ingalls Wilder, Eric Alfred Knudsen, Barbu Lăzăreanu, Wyndham Lewis, Malcolm Lowry, Mait Metsanurk, Christopher Morley, Gilbert Murray, Ralph Barton Perry, Clemente Rebora, Aleksey Remizov, Umberto Saba, Dorothy L. Sayers, and Giuseppe Tomasi di Lampedusa died in 1957 without having been nominated for the prize. French poet Valery Larbaud died before the only chance to be rewarded.

Official list of nominees and their nominators for the prize
No.	Nominee	Country	Genre(s)	Nominator(s)
1	Mark Aldanov (1886–1957)	Ukraine; France	biography, novel, essays, literary criticism	Samson Soloveitchik (1887–1974)
2	Riccardo Bacchelli (1891–1985)	Italy	novel, drama, essays	Mario Fubini (1901–1977); Alfredo Schiaffini (1895–1971); Paolo Toschi (1893–1973)
3	Knuth Becker (1891–1974)	Denmark	poetry, novel	Sven Clausen (1893–1961)
4	Samuel Beckett (1906–1989)	Ireland	novel, drama, poetry	Robert-Léon Wagner (1905–1982)
5	Karen Blixen (1885–1962)	Denmark	novel, short story, memoir	Harry Martinson (1904–1978); Elias Wessén (1889–1981)
6	Albert Camus (1913–1960)	France (Algeria)	novel, short story, essays, philosophy, drama	Sylvère Monod (1921–2006)
7	André Chamson (1900–1983)	France	novel, essays	Jean-Baptiste Fort (1870-1942)
8	Henriette Charasson (1884–1972)	France	poetry, essays, drama, novel, literary criticism, biography	Serge Barrault (1887–1976)
9	Maria Dąbrowska (1889–1965)	Poland	novel, short story, essays, drama, literary criticism	Charles Hyatt (1931–2007)
10	Gonzague de Reynold (1880–1970)	Switzerland	history, essays, biography, memoir	Pierre-Henri Simon (1903–1972)
11	Henry de Montherlant (1895–1972)	France	essays, novel, drama	Eugène Napoleon Tigerstedt (1907–1979)
12	Georges Duhamel (1884–1966)	France	novel, short story, poetry, drama, literary criticism	André Plassart (1889–1978)
13	Mircea Eliade (1907–1986)	Romania; United States	history, philosophy, essays, autobiography, novel, short story	Ernest Koliqi (1903–1975)
14	Johan Falkberget (1879–1967)	Norway	novel, short story, essays	Norwegian Authors' Union
15	Lion Feuchtwanger (1884–1958)	Germany; United States	novel, drama	Viktor Klemperer (1881–1960)
16	Edward Morgan Forster (1879–1970)	United Kingdom	novel, short story, drama, essays, biography, literary criticism	The English PEN-Club; Herbert Koziol (1903–1986)
17	Robert Frost (1874–1963)	United States	poetry, drama	The American PEN-Club
18	Jean Giono (1895–1970)	France	novel, short story, essays, poetry, drama	Robert-Léon Wagner (1905–1982)
19	Armand Godoy (1880–1964)	Cuba; France	poetry, translation	Antonio Iraizoz Villar (1890–1976); Claude Farrère (1876–1957)
20	Hu Shih (1891–1962)	China	essays, philosophy, history, poetry, pedagogy	The Chinese PEN-Club
21	Jarosław Iwaszkiewicz (1894–1980)	Poland	poetry, essays, drama, translation, short story, novel	Charles Hyatt (1931–2007)
22	Nikos Kazantzakis (1883–1957)	Greece	novel, philosophy, essays, drama, memoir, translation	Samuel Baud-Bovy (19061986); Society of Men of Letters of Greece
23	Valery Larbaud (1881–1957)	France	novel, poetry, literary criticism	Pierre Costil (1901–1968)
24	Carlo Levi (1902–1975)	Italy	memoir, novel, short story	Mario Praz (1896–1892)
25	Väinö Linna (1920–1992)	Finland	novel	Rolf Lagerborg (1874–1959)
26	André Malraux (1901–1976)	France	novel, essays, literary criticism	Claude Backvis (1910–1998); Jacques-Henry Bornecque (1910–1995); Société des gens de lettres; Erik Hjalmar Linder (1906–1994)
27	Gabriel Marcel (1889–1973)	France	philosophy, drama	Charles Dédéyan (1910–2003)
28	Ramón Menéndez Pidal (1869–1968)	Spain	philology, history	Gunnar Tilander (1894–1973); Hans Rheinfelder (1898–1971); André Burger (1896–1985)
29	Alberto Moravia (1907–1990)	Italy	novel, literary criticism, essays, drama	Gennaro Perrotta (1900–1962)
30	Seán O'Casey (1880–1964)	Ireland	drama, memoir	Oscar Cargill (1898–1972)
31	Jan Parandowski (1895–1978)	Poland	essays, translation	Charles Hyatt (1931–2007)
32	Boris Pasternak (1890–1960)	Russia	poetry, novel, translation	Harry Martinson (1904–1978)
33	Saint-John Perse (1887–1975)	France	poetry	Dag Hammarskjöld (1905–1961)
34	Ezra Pound (1885–1972)	United States	poetry, essays	Ingvar Andersson (1899–1974)
35	Sarvepalli Radhakrishnan (1888–1975)	India	philosophy, essays, law	Arthur John Arberry (1905–1969); Hywel Lewis (1910–1992)
36	Lennox Robinson (1886–1958)	Ireland	drama, poetry	The Irish PEN-Club
37	Jules Romains (1885–1972)	France	poetry, drama, screenplay	Alfonso Reyes Ochoa (1889–1959); Society of Authors and Composers of Drama; Société des Auteurs et Compositeurs Dramatiques
38	Jean-Paul Sartre (1905–1980)	France	philosophy, novel, drama, essays, screenplay	Jacques Scherer (1912–1997)
39	Zalman Shneour (1887–1959)	Belarus; United States	poetry, essays	Simon Rawidowicz (1897–1957)
40	Ignazio Silone (1900–1978)	Italy	novel, short story, essays, drama	Gennaro Perrotta (1900–1962)
41	Stijn Streuvels (1871–1969)	Belgium	novel, short story	Pierre Brachin (1914–2004); Royal Academy of Dutch Language and Literature
42	Jules Supervielle (1884–1960)	France; Uruguay	poetry, novel, short story	Maurice Le Boucher (1882–1964)
43	Herman Teirlinck (1879–1967)	Belgium	novel, poetry, essays, drama	François Closset (1900–1964); Royal Academy of Dutch Language and Literature; Royal Flemish Academy of Belgium for Science and the Arts
44	Frank Thiess (1890–1977)	West Germany	novel	Kasimir Edschmid (1890–1966)
45	Arnold Joseph Toynbee (1889–1975)	United Kingdom	history, philosophy	Claude Backvis (1910–1998)
46	George Macauley Trevelyan (1876–1962)	United Kingdom	biography, autobiography, essays, history	Elias Wessén (1889–1981)
47	Tarjei Vesaas (1897–1970)	Norway	poetry, novel	Sigmund Skard (1903–1995)
48	Simon Vestdijk (1898–1971)	Netherlands	novel, poetry, essays, translation	The Belgian PEN-Club
49	Gertrud von Le Fort (1876–1971)	West Germany	novel, short story, essays, poetry	Poetry Department of the Prussian Academy of Arts

== Prize decision ==
According to the New York Times, the members of the Swedish Academy voted unanimously for Albert Camus as the 1957 laureate. Anders Österling, permanent secretary of the Academy, said that Camus work "can unhesitatingly be said to conform with the idealistic aim which is the very base of the Nobel Prize." The Danish author Karen Blixen was told by a Swedish journalist the she was the favourite among the judges to be awarded the 1957 Nobel Prize in Literature and expected to win the prize.

== Reactions ==
The choice of Albert Camus was well received in France. Following the prize announcement, author and literature critic Émile Henriot wrote in Le Monde: "He is one of the men whose thought and talent honor France, and it is wonderful that this title is recognized with such brilliance abroad. The high literary qualities of his work have, with five or six important books, undoubtedly deserved the place he occupies at the forefront of our writers". Camus himself modestly said: "I wish Malraux had got the prize. He deserved it more than I did".

== Award ceremony ==
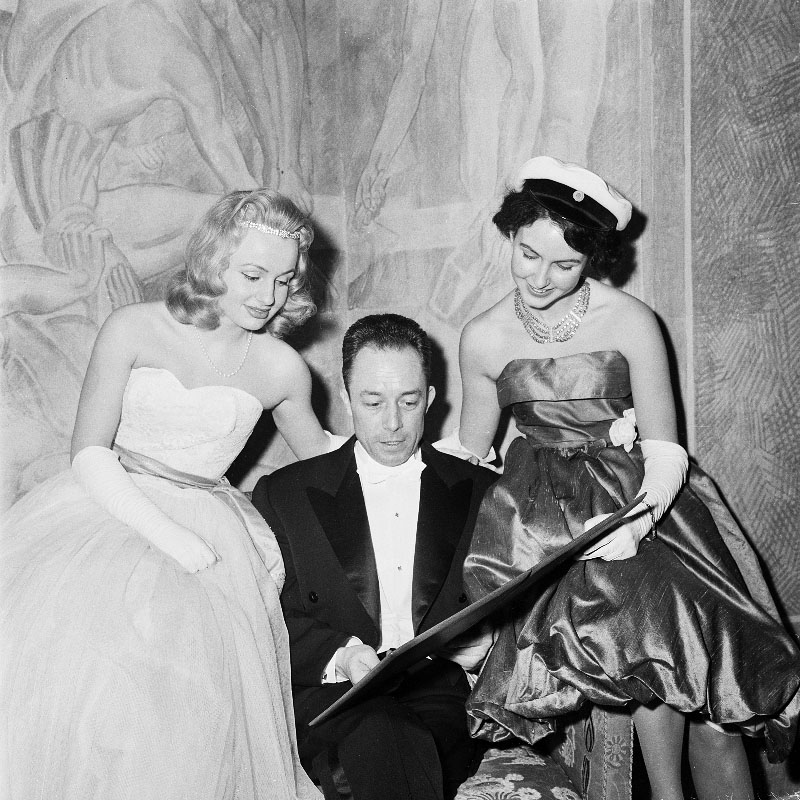
Camus in Stockholm for the Nobel Prize

At the award ceremony in Stockholm on 10 December 1957 Anders Österling, permanent secretary of the Swedish Academy, said:

Active and highly creative, Camus is in the centre of interest in the literary world, even outside of France. Inspired by an authentic moral engagement, he devotes himself with all his being to the great fundamental questions of life, and certainly this aspiration corresponds to the idealistic end for which the Nobel Prize was established. Behind his incessant affirmation of the absurdity of the human condition is no sterile negativism. This view of things is supplemented in him by a powerful imperative, a nevertheless, an appeal to the will which incites to revolt against absurdity and which, for that reason, creates a value.

== Nobel banquet ==
At the Nobel banquet in Stockholm City Hall on 10 December 1957, Albert Camus held a speech in which he spoke about his idea of his art and the role of the writer. Prior to the speech, Bernard Karlgren, a member of the Swedish Royal Academy of Sciences, addressed Camus, pointing out the prominent role of France in Western culture and said:

In your writings we find manifested to a high degree the clarity and the lucidity, the penetration and the subtlety, the inimitable art inherent in your literary language, all of which we admire and warmly love. We salute you as a true representative of that wonderful French spirit.
