= 1953 Nobel Prize in Literature =

- Sir Winston Churchill
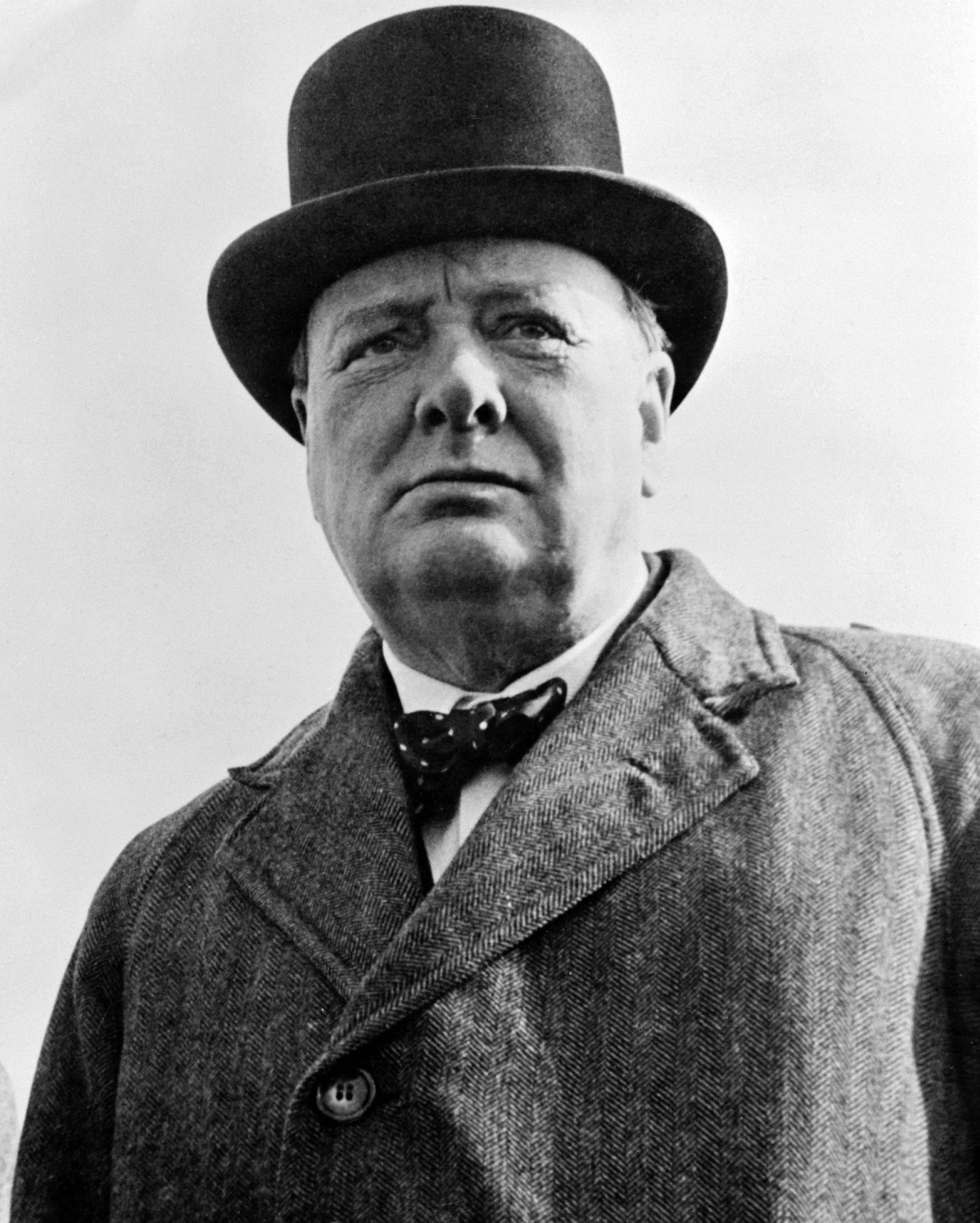
- "for his mastery of historical and biographical description as well as for brilliant oratory in defending exalted human values".
- Date: 13 October 1953 (announcement); 10 December 1953 (ceremony)
- Location: Stockholm, Sweden
- Presented by: Swedish Academy
- First award: 1901
- Website: Official website

The 1953 Nobel Prize in Literature was awarded to the prime minister of the United Kingdom Sir Winston Churchill (1874–1965) "for his mastery of historical and biographical description as well as for brilliant oratory in defending exalted human values". He is the sixth British writer to receive the prize, coming after the philosopher Bertrand Russell in 1950.

== Laureate ==
One of the most well-known leaders of the 20th century, Winston Churchill, also left behind a sizable corpus of writing. His writings include a multivolume study about the First and Second World Wars, a thorough history of his ancestor the first Duke of Marlborough, and an autobiography in which he recounts his exciting years as an officer and war journalist. The books' entertaining writing style is combined with their neutrality. Churchill's memorable and historic speeches delivered during World War II are among his most significant literary compositions. Among his famous non-fiction works include Arms and the Covenant (1938), The World Crisis (1923–1931), The Second World War (1948–1953), and A History of the English-Speaking Peoples (1956–1958).

== Deliberations ==
=== Nominations ===
Churchill was nominated for the prize on 23 occasions since 1946, the first time made by Axel Romdahl, a member of the Royal Swedish Academy of Letters, History and Antiquities. He received the highest number of nominations – six nominations from academics and writers – for the year 1950. In 1953, he received a single nomination from Birger Nerman, member of the same academy, which eventually led to him being awarded.

In total, the Nobel Committee of the Swedish Academy received 34 nominations for 24 writers. The highest number of nominations – 3 nominations each – were for Johan Falkberget, Tarjei Vesaas, and Rudolf Kassner. Three of the nominees were nominated first-time, namely the German poet Gottfried Benn, Peruvian Alberto Hidalgo, and the Austrian writer Max Mell. No women were nominated for the prize that year.

The authors Hilaire Belloc, Henri Bernstein, Elsa Beskow, Ugo Betti, Émile Cammaerts, Idris Davies, Julia de Burgos, Ellen Hørup, C. E. M. Joad, Elizabeth Mary Jones (known as Moelona), Alice Milligan, Theodore Francis Powys, Hans Reichenbach, Marjorie Rawlings, Dylan Thomas, Marguerite Vallette-Eymery (known as Rachilde), John van Melle, and Alfred Vierkandt died in 1953 without having been nominated for the prize.

Official list of nominees and their nominators for the prize
No.	Nominee	Country	Genre(s)	Nominator(s)
1	Mark Aldanov (1886–1957)	Soviet Union (Ukraine); France	biography, novel, essays, literary criticism	Ivan Bunin (1870–1953)
2	Julien Benda (1867–1956)	France	novel, philosophy, essays, literary criticism	Holger Sten (1907–1971)
3	Gottfried Benn (1886–1956)	West Germany	poetry, essays	Heinrich Kuen (1899–1989)
4	Werner Bergengruen (1892–1964)	West Germany	novel, short story, poetry	Paulus Svendsen (1904–1989)
5	Winston Churchill (1874–1965)	United Kingdom	history, essays, memoir	Birger Nerman (1888–1971)
6	Walter de la Mare (1873–1956)	United Kingdom	novel, short story, poetry, literary criticism, essays	Harry Martinson (1904–1978)
7	Johan Falkberget (1879–1967)	Norway	novel, short story, essays	Andreas Hofgaard Winsnes (1889–1972); Richard Beck (1897–1980); Paulus Svendsen (1904–1989)
8	Edward Morgan Forster (1879–1970)	United Kingdom	novel, short story, drama, essays, biography, literary criticism	Prince Wilhelm, Duke of Södermanland (1884–1965)
9	Robert Frost (1874–1963)	United States	poetry, drama	Hjalmar Gullberg (1898–1961)
10	Graham Greene (1904–1991)	United Kingdom	novel, short story, autobiography, essays	Oscar Wieselgren (1886–1971)
11	Franz Hellens (1881–1972)	Belgium	novel, poetry, literary criticism	Gustave Charlier (1885–1959)
12	Ernest Hemingway (1899–1961)	United States	novel, short story, screenplay	Elias Wessén (1889–1981)
13	Alberto Hidalgo Lobato (1897–1967)	Peru	poetry, essays	Gabriela Mistral (1889–1957)
14	Juan Ramón Jiménez (1881–1958)	Spain	poetry, novel	Hjalmar Gullberg (1898–1961)
15	Rudolf Kassner (1873–1959)	Austria	philosophy, essays, translation	Werner Bergengruen (1892–1964); Friedrich Bischoff (1896–1976); Hermann Kasack (1896–1966); Erich Kästner (1899–1974); Martin Kessel (1901–1990); Annette Kolb (1870–1967); Ernst Penzoldt (1892–1955); Frank Thiess (1890–1977); Carl August Emge (1886–1970); Rudolf Pechel (1882–1961)
16	Nikos Kazantzakis (1883–1957)	Greece	novel, philosophy, essays, drama, memoir, translation	Hans Heiberg (1904–1978)
17	Halldór Laxness (1902–1998)	Iceland	novel, short story, drama, poetry	Steingrímur Þorsteinsson (1911–1973); Jón Helgason (1899–1986); Sigurður Nordal (1886–1974)
18	Max Mell (1882–1971)	Austria	novel, drama, screenplay	Austrian Academy of Sciences
19	Alfonso Reyes Ochoa (1889–1959)	Mexico	philosophy, essays, novel, poetry	Fidelino de Figueiredo (1888–1967)
20	Jules Romains (1885–1972)	France	poetry, drama, screenplay	Lorentz Eckhoff (1884–1974)
21	Carl Sandburg (1878–1967)	United States	poetry, essays, biography	Harry Martinson (1904–1978)
22	Zalman Shneour (1887–1959)	Soviet Union (Belarus); United States	poetry, essays	Naftali Herz Tur-Sinai (1886–1973); Joseph Klausner (1874–1958)
23	Stijn Streuvels (1871–1969)	Belgium	novel, short story	The Vlaanderen PEN-Club; Royal Academy of Dutch Language and Literature
24	Tarjei Vesaas (1897–1970)	Norway	poetry, novel	Olav Midttun (1883–1972); Sigmund Skard (1903–1995); Harald Beyer (1891–1960)

=== Prize decision ===
Churchill was first nominated for the Nobel Prize in Literature in 1946, but his candidacy was then rejected. In 1948 academy member Nils Ahnlund wrote in a report that Churchill is "not entirely qualified for the literature prize", but considering his rhetorics Ahnlund said he was qualified: "This rhetoric, by turns simple, by turns elevated but always comprehensible for each and everyone, has the mark of genuine art." The Swedish Academy was however worried that a prize to Churchill would be seen as politically motivated, and his candidacy was postponed. By 1953, the academy thought that enough time had passed since the end of the war and hoped that a prize to Churchill would be regarded as a literary award.

== Reactions ==
The decision to award Winston Churchill the Nobel Prize in Literature has been questioned. "Winston Churchill is historical but he belongs only to a little extent to the history of literature," wrote Helmer Lång in his 2001 book about the Nobel Prizes in literature, "It was the defender of democracy, the winner against fascism, that was awarded a Nobel Prize". Lång said that "for once it was also a master of eloquence that was awarded", that it was Churchill's speeches during World War II and his recently completed non-fiction work The Second World War that got him the prize.

Churchill himself said: "I think it a very great honour to receive from the Swedish Academy of Literature this distinction gained among all the other writers of the world." But according to his private secretary Anthony Montague Browne, Churchill was disappointed that he had not been awarded the Nobel Peace Prize: “Churchill deeply wished to be remembered as a peacemaker.... I remember vividly his early and touching joy, which turned to indifference when he learned that it was for Literature and not for Peace.”

== Award ceremony ==
Due to health concerns, Churchill did not go to Sweden for the award ceremony. Instead, Lady Clementine Churchill, his wife, accompanied by their daughter Mary Soames, travelled to Stockholm to receive the Prize on his behalf in December of the same year.
