= 1951 Nobel Prize in Literature =

- Pär Lagerkvist
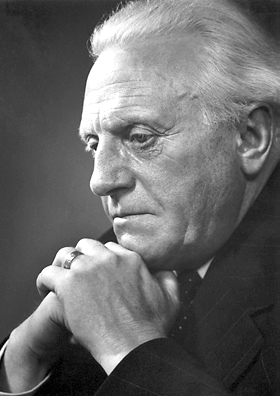
- "for the artistic vigour and true independence of mind with which he endeavours in his poetry to find answers to the eternal questions confronting mankind."
- Date: November 1951 (announcement); 10 December 1951 (ceremony)
- Location: Stockholm, Sweden
- Presented by: Swedish Academy
- First award: 1901
- Website: Official website

The 1951 Nobel Prize in Literature was awarded the Swedish author Pär Lagerkvist "for the artistic vigour and true independence of mind with which he endeavours in his poetry to find answers to the eternal questions confronting mankind." Lagerkvist is the fourth Swedish recipient of the Nobel Prize in Literature after Lagerlöf in 1909, Von Heidenstam in 1916, and Karlfeldt in 1931.

== Laureate ==
Pär Lagerkvist wrote novels, poetry, plays, short stories and essays and were one of major Swedish literary figures of the first half of the 20th century. In his early years Lagerkvist supported modernist and aesthetically radical views, as shown by his manifesto Ordkonst och bildkonst ("Word Art and Picture Art", 1913) and the play Den Svåra Stunden ("The Difficult Hour", 1918). In 1916, he published Ångest ("Anguish"), a violent and disillusioned collection of poems. The novel Bödeln ("The Hangman", 1933) and the play Mannen utan själ ("The Man Without a Soul", 1936) expresses Lagerkvist's indignation over rising fascism. A recurring theme in his writings is the fundamental question of good and evil, and the problem of man's relation to God. This theme is particularly notable in the 1944 novel Dvärgen ("The Dwarf"), which became his first major success, followed by Barabbas (1950), a novel that won Lagerkvist world recognition. His works also include the notable autobiographical novel Gäst hos verkligheten ("Guest of Reality", 1925), and two of his most important works, the collection of poems Aftonland ("Evening Land", 1953) and the novel Sibyllan ("The Sibyl", 1956), which were published after he was awarded the Nobel prize.

== Deliberations ==
=== Nominations ===
Pär Lagerkvist had first been proposed for the prize in 1947. Following the publication of his novel Barabbas, Lagerkvist had been one of the favorites to be awarded the Nobel Prize in Literature in 1950. In 1951, the Nobel committee for literature received nine nominations for Lagerkvist, including nominations from the French authors and previous laureates André Gide and Roger Martin du Gard, and the Swedish Academy decided to award him the prize.

In total the Nobel committee received 44 nominations for 25 writers including Taha Hussein, Paul Claudel, Winston Churchill (awarded in 1953), Ramón Menéndez Pidal, Tarjei Vesaas and Halldór Kiljan Laxness (awarded in 1955). The Greek authors Nikos Kazantzakis and Angelos Sikelianos were nominated both individually and for a shared prize by academy member Sigfrid Siwertz. The Spanish writer José Ortega y Gasset were nominated by 18 members of the Royal Spanish Academy. Six of the nominees were newly nominated among them Ezequiel Martínez Estrada, Katharine Susannah Prichard, Rómulo Gallegos, José Maria Ferreira de Castro, and María Enriqueta Camarillo. Two women were nominated namely the Australian author Katherine Susannah Prichard and the Mexican writer Maria Enriqueta Camarillo.

The authors Antoine Bibesco, Algernon Blackwood, Tadeusz Borowski, James Bridie, Abraham Cahan, Émile Chartier, Lloyd C. Douglas, René Guénon, Fumiko Hayashi, Sadegh Hedayat, Louis Lavelle, Henri-René Lenormand, Richard Malden, Margaret Mayo, Oscar Micheaux, Takashi Nagai, Andrei Platonov, Pedro Salinas, Božena Slančíková (known as Timrava), Henry De Vere Stacpoole, Vsevolod Vishnevsky, Henrik Visnapuu, Ludwig Wittgenstein, and Miyamoto Yuriko died in 1951 without having been nominated for the prize.

Official list of nominees and their nominators for the prize
No.	Nominee	Country	Genre(s)	Nominator(s)
1	Shmuel Yosef Agnon (1887–1970)	Israel	novel, short story	Simon Halkin (1899–1987)
2	Mark Aldanov (1886–1957)	Soviet Union (Ukraine); France	biography, novel, essays, literary criticism	Ivan Bunin (1870–1953)
3	María Enriqueta Camarillo (1872–1968)	Mexico	novel, short story, drama, poetry, translation	Leavitt Olds Wright (1891–1980)
4	Winston Churchill (1874–1965)	United Kingdom	history, essays, memoir	Birger Nerman (1888–1971); George Macauley Trevelyan (1876–1962)
5	Paul Claudel (1868–1955)	France	poetry, drama, essays, memoir	Kåre Foss (1895–1967)
6	Júlio Dantas (1876–1962)	Portugal	poetry, drama, novel, essays	Brazilian Academy of Letters; Hjalmar Hammarskjöld (1862–1953)
7	Georges Duhamel (1884–1966)	France	novel, short story, poetry, drama, literary criticism	Hjalmar Hammarskjöld (1862–1953)
8	José Maria Ferreira de Castro (1898–1978)	Portugal	novel	Holger Sten (1907–1971)
9	Rómulo Gallegos (1884–1969)	Venezuela	novel, short story	Margot Arce de Vázquez (1904–1990); Francisco Matos Paoli (1915–2000); Julia Braschi (–); Ángel Luis Morales (–); Manuel Siaca Rivera (1906–1984); Lewis Richardson (–); Luis Alberto Sánchez (1900–1994); Manuel Garcia Díaz (–); David Jackson McWilliams (1909–1986); Siguen Firmas (–); Asociación des Escritores Venezolanos
10	Manuel Gálvez (1882–1962)	Argentina	novel, poetry, drama, essays, history, biography	Manuel Alcobre (1900–1977)
11	Taha Hussein (1889–1973)	Egypt	novel, short story, poetry, translation	Academy of the Arabic Language
12	Nikos Kazantzakis (1883–1957)	Greece	novel, philosophy, essays, drama, memoir, translation	Sigfrid Siwertz (1882–1970)
13	Pär Lagerkvist (1891–1974)	Sweden	poetry, novel, short story, drama	Oscar Wieselgren (1886–1971); Paulus Svendsen (1904–1989); Lorentz Eckhoff (1884–1974); Fernand Baldensperger (1871–1958); Roger Martin du Gard (1881–1958); André Gide (1869–1951); Norwegian Authors' Union; Prince Wilhelm, Duke of Södermanland (1884–1965); Hjalmar Gullberg (1898–1961)
14	Halldór Laxness (1902–1998)	Iceland	novel, short story, drama, poetry	Einar Ólafur Sveinsson (1899–1984); Sigurður Nordal (1886–1974)
15	Ezequiel Martínez Estrada (1895–1964)	Argentina	poetry, essays, literary criticism, biography	Sociedad Argentina de Escritores
16	Ramón Menéndez Pidal (1869–1968)	Spain	philology, history	Gunnar Tilander (1894–1973); Walther von Wartburg (1888–1971); Alonso Zamora Vicente (1916–2006); Academia Chilena de la Lengua
17	Alfred Noyes (1880–1958)	United Kingdom	poetry, drama, essays, biography, novel, short story, literary criticism	Laurence McGinley, S.J. (1905–1992)
18	José Ortega y Gasset (1883–1955)	Spain	philosophy, essays	Ramón Menéndez Pidal (1869–1968); Julio Casares Sánchez (1877–1964); Agustín González de Amezúa (1881–1956); Jacobo Fitz-James Stuart (1878–1953); Francisco Javier Sánchez Cantón (1891–1971); Emilio García Gómez (1905–1995); José María de Cossío (1892–1977); Luis Martínez Kléiser (1883–1971); Manuel Gómez-Moreno Martínez (1870–1970); Emilio Fernández Galiano (1885–1953); Gerardo Diego Cendoya (1896–1987); Juan Ignacio Luca de Tena (1897–1975); Gregorio Marañón Posadillo (1887–1960); Gabriel Maura Gamazo (1879–1963); Vicente García de Diego (1878–1978); Wenceslao Fernández Flórez (1885–1964); Ramón Cabanillas Enríquez (1876–1959); Eugenio d'Ors i Rovira (1881–1954)
19	Katharine Susannah Prichard (1883–1969)	Australia	novel, short story, drama, poetry, autobiography	William Allan Edwards (1909–1995); Fellowship of Australian Writers
20	Zalman Shneour (1887–1959)	Soviet Union (Belarus); United States	poetry, essays	Joseph Klausner (1874–1958); The Hebrew PEN-Club
21	Angelos Sikelianos (1884–1951)	Greece	poetry, drama	Sigfrid Siwertz (1882–1970)
22	Sotíris Skipis (c. 1881–1952)	Greece	poetry, drama, translation	unnamed
23	Tarjei Vesaas (1897–1970)	Norway	poetry, novel	Olav Midttun (1883–1972); Sigmund Skard (1903–1995)
24	Mika Waltari (1908–1979)	Finland	short story, novel, poetry, drama, essays, screenplay	Aarne Anttila (1892–1952)

=== Prize decision ===
Pär Lagerkvist was first nominated for the prize in 1947. In 1947 and 1949 Lagerkvist, himself a member of the Swedish Academy, declined to be considered for the prize and the Nobel committee did thus not discuss his candidacy. While respecting his will, the committee the latter year still urged the Academy to "take notice of the proposition". Lagerkvist was nominated again in 1950 and nominators argued that his prominent role as a pioneer and innovator in Swedish-language literature and his humanity qualified him for the prize. The international success of Lagerkvist's 1950 novel Barabbas and the nominations from the French Nobel laureates André Gide and Roger Martin du Gard became decisive for the Academy to award Lagerkvist the prize in 1951.

== Reactions ==
Although several Nordic and Swedish authors had been awarded the Nobel Prize in Literature before and Lagerkvist himself was a member of the awarding institution the Swedish Academy, the decision to award him was defended as a legitimate choice in the Swedish press by critics Erik Hjalmar Linder and Sten Selander, saying the internationally recognised Lagerkvist undoubtedly deserved the prize. Selander argued that Lagerkvist was a classic modernist in the same class as the two recent laureates William Faulkner and T. S. Eliot.

== Award ceremony ==
At the award ceremony in Stockholm on 10 December 1951, Anders Österling, permanent secretary of the Swedish Academy, spoke about Lagerkvist's writing and also spent a part of the speech justifying the Academy's decision to award a Swedish author:

Nobel’s will explicitly prescribes that the Prizes should be awarded«without any consideration of nationality, so that they should be awarded to the worthiest, be he Scandinavian or not.» That should also signify that if a writer seems worthy of the Nobel Prize, the fact that he is Swedish, for example, should not in the end hinder him from obtaining it. As for Pär Lagerkvist, we must consider another factor, which pleases us very much: his last work has attracted much sympathy and esteem outside our frontiers. This was further proved by the insistent recommendations with which Lagerkvist’s candidacy has been sustained by a majority of foreign advisers. He does not owe his Prize to the Academy circle itself.

Österling then further explained the decision to award Pär Lagerkvist the Nobel Prize in Literature:

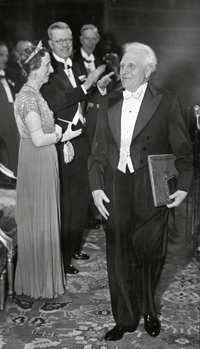
Pär Lagerkvist at the Nobel ceremony.

On each page of Pär Lagerkvist’s work are words and ideas which, in their profound and fearful tenderness, carry at the very heart of their purity a message of terror. Their origin is in a simple, rustic life, laborious and frugal of words. But these words, these thoughts, handled by a master, have been placed at the service of other designs and have been given a greater purpose, that of raising to the level of art an interpretation of the time, the world, and man’s eternal condition. That is why in the statement of the reasons for awarding the Nobel Prize to Pär Lagerkvist, it seems legitimate to us to affirm that this national literary production has risen to the European level.

== Banquet speech ==
At the banquet at Stockholm City Hall on 10 December 1951, Pär Lagerkvist thanked his colleagues in the Swedish Academy for the honour of awarding him the Nobel Prize and then read a piece from an unpublished novel written in 1922 called Myten om människorna ("The Myth of Mankind"). "I found that the beginning of it roughly includes just what I was going to say here today, but in the form of fiction, which undeniebly suits me better", Lagerkvist said, "It is about the mysterious of our essence and our existence, about this what makes the destiny of the human being so grand - and so difficult."
