= 1950 Nobel Prize in Literature =

- Bertrand Russell
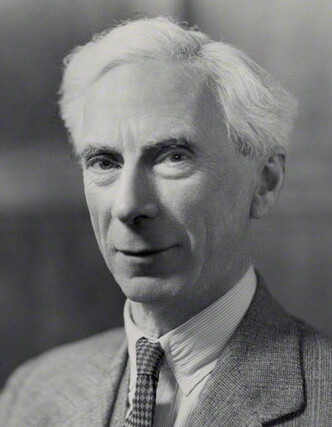
- Date: 10 November 1950 (Note: The Swedish Academy decided on 10th November 1950 that the 1949 Nobel Prize in Literature should be awarded to William Faulkner and that this year's Nobel Prize in Literature should be awarded to Bertrand Russell.) (announcement); 10 December 1950 (ceremony)
- Location: Stockholm, Sweden
- Presented by: Swedish Academy
- First award: 1901
- Website: Official website

The 1950 Nobel Prize in Literature was awarded to the British philosopher Bertrand Russell (1872–1970) "in recognition of his varied and significant writings in which he champions humanitarian ideals and freedom of thought." He is the third philosopher to become a recipient of the prize after the German philosopher Rudolf Christoph Eucken in 1908 and the French analytic-continental philosopher Henri Bergson in 1927, and the fifth British author to be awarded.

== Laureate ==
Bertrand Russell made his first pioneering contributions within the branch of philosophy that deals with logic and mathematics. But his influence eventually spread across much more ground. His work is known for its lightheartedness and humor, and it has helped a large audience of readers learn about science and philosophy. His writings cover a variety of subjects, including social and moral challenges, and his opinions were frequently divisive. Russell was a fierce champion of the right to free speech and thinking as well as a strong supporter of reason and humanism. His most famous philosophical works include Principia Mathematica (1910–1913), The Problems of Philosophy (1912), Why I Am Not a Christian (1927), Power: A New Social Analysis (1938), and A History of Western Philosophy (1945).

== Deliberations ==
=== Nominations ===
Russell had not been nominated for the prize before 1950, making it one of the rare occasions when an author have been awarded the Nobel Prize in Literature the same year they were first nominated. He was only nominated once by nominator Eugen Tigerstedt (1907–1979), professor of Swedish literature at the University of Helsinki.

In total, the Nobel committee received 79 nominations for 54 writers. Pär Lagerkvist (awarded in 1951) received seven nominations and was named a favorite following the publication of his novel Barabbas, while Winston Churchill (awarded in 1953) received six nominations. Twenty of the nominees were nominated first-time such as Simon Vestdijk, Graham Greene, Mika Waltari, Martin Buber, Robert Frost, Karl Jaspers, Alfred Noyes, John Dewey, Hermann Broch, and Robert Graves. Four of the nominees were women namely Karen Blixen, Marie Under, Gertrud von Le Fort, and Henriette Roland Holst. The American author William Faulkner was nominated in 1950 and was awarded retroactively with the 1949 prize.

The authors Edgar Rice Burroughs, Augusto d'Halmar, Albert Ehrenstein, John Gould Fletcher, Nicolai Hartmann, George Cecil Ives, Alfred Korzybski, Sigizmund Krzhizhanovsky, Elisabeth Langgässer, Marcel Mauss, Edna St. Vincent Millay, Emmanuel Mounier, Cesare Pavese, Ernest Poole, Hilda D. Oakeley, George Orwell, Alykul Osmonov, Rafael Sabatini, Agnes Smedley, Olaf Stapledon, Xavier Villaurrutia, and Yi Gwangsu (nominated posthumously in 1970) died in 1950 without having been nominated.

Official list of nominees and their nominators for the prize
No.	Nominee	Country	Genre(s)	Nominator(s)
1	Mark Aldanov (1886–1957)	Soviet Union (Ukraine); France	biography, novel, essays, literary criticism	Ivan Bunin (1870–1953)
2	Eugène Baie (1874–1964)	Belgium	law, essays	Paul Saintenoy (1862–1952)
3	Karen Blixen (1885–1962)	Denmark	novel, short story, memoir	Cai Woel (1895–1963)
4	Jacobus Cornelis Bloem (1887–1966)	Netherlands	poetry, essays	Victor Emanuel van Vriesland (1892–1974)
5	Hermann Broch (1886–1951)	Austria	novel, essays	The Austrian PEN-Club
6	Martin Buber (1878–1965)	Austria; Israel	philosophy	Hermann Hesse (1877–1962)
7	Albert Camus (1913–1960)	France	novel, short story, essays, philosophy, drama	Gustaf Hellström (1882–1953)
8	Hans Carossa (1878–1956)	West Germany	poetry, autobiography, essays	Axel Lindqvist (1873–1953)
9	Winston Churchill (1874–1965)	United Kingdom	history, essays, memoir	Wilhelm Keilhau (1888–1954); Heinrich Wolfgang Donner (1904-1980); Ture Johnsson Arne (1879–1965); Harald Hagendahl (1889–1986); Birger Nerman (1888–1971); Axel Romdahl (1880–1951)
10	Paul Claudel (1868–1955)	France	poetry, drama, essays, memoir	Fernand Gregh (1873–1960); French Centre – PEN International; Hjalmar Gullberg (1898–1961)
11	Benedetto Croce (1866–1952)	Italy	history, philosophy, law	Gösta Säflund (1903–2004); Società Italiana degli Autori ed Editori
12	Júlio Dantas (1876–1962)	Portugal	poetry, drama, novel, essays	Lisbon Academy of Sciences
13	John Dewey (1859–1952)	United States	philosophy, pedagogy, essays	Henry Steele Commager (1902–1998)
14	Georges Duhamel (1884–1966)	France	novel, short story, poetry, drama, literary criticism	French Centre – PEN International; Hjalmar Hammarskjöld (1862–1953)
15	Johan Falkberget (1879–1967)	Norway	novel, short story, essays	Torstein Høverstad (1880–1959); Richard Beck (1897–1980)
16	William Faulkner (1897–1962)	United States	novel, short story, screenplay, poetry, essays	Prince Wilhelm, Duke of Södermanland (1884–1965)
17	Robert Frost (1874–1963)	United States	poetry, drama	American Academy of Arts and Letters
18	Edward Morgan Forster (1879–1970)	United Kingdom	novel, short story, drama, essays, biography, literary criticism	English PEN Centre
19	Robert Graves (1895–1985)	United Kingdom	history, novel, poetry, literary criticism, essays	Harry Martinson (1904–1978)
20	Graham Greene (1904–1991)	United Kingdom	novel, short story, autobiography, essays	Gustaf Hellström (1882–1953); Einar Löfstedt (1880–1955)
21	Ernest Hemingway (1899–1961)	United States	novel, short story, screenplay	Anders Österling (1884–1981)
22	Taha Hussein (1889–1973)	Egypt	novel, short story, poetry, translation	Bernard Guyon (1904–1975)
23	Nikos Kazantzakis (1883–1957)	Greece	novel, philosophy, essays, drama, memoir, translation	Hjalmar Gullberg (1898–1961)
24	Karl Jaspers (1883–1969)	West Germany; Switzerland	philosophy	Ernst Levy (1881–1968)
25	Johannes Jørgensen (1866–1956)	Denmark	novel, poetry, biography	Cai Woel (1895–1963)
26	Pär Lagerkvist (1891–1974)	Sweden	poetry, novel, short story, drama	Hans Heiberg (1904–1978); Harry Martinson (1904–1978); Hjalmar Gullberg (1898–1961); Martin Lamm (1880–1950); Cai Woel (1895–1963); Gunnar Beskow (1901–1991); Ragnar Ekelund (1892–1960)
27	Halldór Laxness (1902–1998)	Iceland	novel, short story, drama, poetry	Dag Strömbäck (1900–1978); Halldór Stefánsson (1892–1979); Jón Helgason (1899–1986)
28	Enrique Larreta (1875–1961)	Argentina	history, essays, drama, novel	José Antonio Oría Mestres (1896–1970); Álvaro Melián Lafinur (1889–1958)
29	Leonid Leonov (1899–1994)	Soviet Union	drama, novel, short story	Valentin Kiparsky (1904–1983)
30	Lin Yutang (1895–1976)	China	novel, philosophy, essays, translation	Pearl Buck (1892–1973)
31	François Mauriac (1885–1970)	France	novel, short story	Fernand Gregh (1873–1960); French Centre – PEN International
32	Ramón Menéndez Pidal (1869–1968)	Spain	philology, history	Gunnar Tilander (1894–1973)
33	Martin Andersen Nexø (1869–1954)	Denmark	novel, short story	Kai Friis Møller (1888–1960); Cai Woel (1895–1963)
34	Alfred Noyes (1880–1958)	United Kingdom	poetry, drama, essays, biography, novel, short story, literary criticism	Frederick Samuel Boas (1862–1957)
35	Seán O'Casey (1880–1964)	Ireland	drama, memoir	Mary Elizabeth Morton (1876–1957); Oscar Wieselgren (1886–1971)
36	Arnulf Øverland (1889–1968)	Norway	poetry, essays	Cai Woel (1895–1963)
37	Boris Pasternak (1890–1960)	Soviet Union	poetry, novel, translation	Martin Lamm (1880–1950)
38	Edward Plunkett (1878–1957)	Ireland	short story, novel, drama, poetry, essays, history, autobiography	Irish PEN Centre
39	Thomas Head Raddall (1903–1994)	Canada	novel, short story, history, essays, memoir	Will Richard Bird (1891–1984)
40	Henriette Roland Holst (1869–1952)	Netherlands	poetry, essays, biography	Victor Emanuel van Vriesland (1892–1974)
41	Jules Romains (1885–1972)	France	poetry, drama, screenplay	Fernand Gregh (1873–1960); French Centre – PEN International
42	Bertrand Russell (1872–1970)	United Kingdom	philosophy, essays, history	Eugen Tigerstedt (1907–1979)
43	Jean Schlumberger (1877–1968)	France	poetry, essays	French Centre – PEN International
44	Mikhail Sholokhov (1905–1984)	Soviet Union	novel	Valentin Kiparsky (1904–1983)
45	Angelos Sikelianos (1884–1951)	Greece	poetry, drama	Hjalmar Gullberg (1898–1961); Hellenic Authors' Society
46	Leopold Staff (1878–1957)	Poland	poetry, translation	Jan Parandowski (1895–1978)
47	Albert Steffen (1884–1963)	Switzerland	poetry, essays, drama, novel	Kersti Bergroth (1886–1975)
48	Stijn Streuvels (1871–1969)	Belgium	novel, short story	Franz De Backer (1891–1961)
49	Arnold Joseph Toynbee (1889–1975)	United Kingdom	history, philosophy	Fredrik Böök (1883–1961)
50	Marie Under (1883–1980)	Soviet Union (Estonia)	poetry	Johannes Aavik (1880–1973)
51	Tarjei Vesaas (1897–1970)	Norway	poetry, novel	Olav Midttun (1883–1972)
52	Simon Vestdijk (1898–1971)	Netherlands	novel, poetry, essays, translation	Victor Emanuel van Vriesland (1892–1974)
53	Gertrud von Le Fort (1876–1971)	West Germany	novel, short story, essays, poetry	Hermann Hesse (1877–1962)
54	Mika Waltari (1908–1979)	Finland	short story, novel, poetry, drama, essays, screenplay	Yrjö Soini (1896–1975); Aarne Anttila (1892–1952)

== Prize decision ==
In 1950, the Nobel committee's shortlisted candidates were Bertrand Russell, William Faulkner, Ernest Hemingway, Graham Greene and the Greek writers Angelos Sikelianos and Nikos Kazantzakis for a proposed shared prize. The committee unanimously proposed that Bertrand Russell should be awarded the prize for 1950. In the committee's report to the Swedish Academy, committee chairman Anders Österling wrote that Russell "should be given a definite priority both because of his superior intellectual equipment and his far-reaching influence as a modern Enlightenment philosopher (...) Through his liberal humanism, Russell also seems to me to correspond in the best sense precisely to the wishes and the way of thinking that guided Alfred Nobel when he established his prizes."

For the reserved 1949 prize, the Nobel committee proposed William Faulkner, a shared prize to Sikeleanos and Kazantzakis and Pär Lagerkvist (subsequently awarded the 1951 Nobel Prize in Literature).

On 10 November 1950, the Swedish Academy decided the prize for 1949 should be awarded to William Faulkner and the prize for 1950 to Bertrand Russell.

== Award Ceremony ==
During the award ceremony held at Stockholm City Hall on 10 December 1950, Anders Österling of the Swedish Academy, said:

"With his superior intellect, Russell has, throughout half a century, been at the centre of public debate, watchful and always ready for battle, as active as ever to this very day, having behind him a life of writing of most imposing scope. His works in the sciences concerned with human knowledge and mathematical logic are epoch-making and have been compared to Newton's fundamental results in mechanics. Yet it is not these achievements in special branches of science that the Nobel Prize is primarily meant to recognize. What is important, from our point of view, is that Russell has so extensively addressed his books to a public of laymen, and, in doing so, has been so eminently successful in keeping alive the interest in general philosophy."

== Nobel lecture ==
Russell delivered a Nobel lecture entitled "What Desires Are Politically Important?" at the Swedish Academy on 11 December 1950. The lecture addresses the political ramifications of desires that are considered infinite in their ability to be satisfied but not necessary for immediate human survival. He highly stressed the importance of neutral and socially beneficial venues for the venting of passions and suggests the cultivation of intelligence as the best antidote for social strife.
