= Paulus Svendsen =

Norwegian historian (1904–1989)

Paulus Svendsen (17 April 1904 – 21 April 1989) was a Norwegian professor and literary historian. He is mainly remembered for his biographies of notable thinkers of Western philosophy.

== Biography ==
He was born in Egersund, Norway. He was the son of Oscar Svendsen (1876–1967), and his wife, Dagmar Marie Steffensen (born 1882). His father was a Methodist priest. He started studying at the University of Oslo in 1923, and graduated with a cand.philol. degree seven years later. In 1940, he defended a thesis titled Gullalderdrøm og utviklingstro, which earned him a dr.philos. degree in the subsequent year.

He taught as an associate professor at the University of Berlin 1931–1933, lecturer at Trondheim Cathedral School from 1933 and head teacher at Trondheim Handelsgymnasium from 1937. He was hired as a senior lecturer in comparative literature at the University of Oslo in 1946. He was appointed professor of European literature three years later. From 1960 to 1974 he held a professorship in Intellectual history.

Paulus Svendsen was interested in the evolution of philosophical thought of the western world, in particular the philosophical view of the world known as weltanschaaungen. He wrote biographies on Dutch philosopher Erasmus, Danish philosopher and theologian Søren Kierkegaard, Norwegian short story writer and novelist Maurits Hansen and Norwegian poet Conrad Nicolai Schwach. He was also one of the editors of the biographical dictionary Norsk biografisk leksikon.

He died during 1989 and was buried at Vestre gravlund in Oslo.

== Selected works ==
- Gullalderdrøm og utviklingstro (1940)
- Maurits Christopher Hansen (1942)
- Renessanse-humanistene og humanitas (1959)
- Zur Frage der Humanitas Erasmiana (1967)
- Kristianismen : kulturfornyer eller kulturforstyrrer? (1978)
- Enhet og mangfold i europeisk kultur (1980)
- Forelesninger og studier (1982)
