= Nobel Prize in Literature =

Prize established in 1895 by Alfred Nobel

- Awarded for: Outstanding contributions in literature
- Location: Stockholm, Sweden
- Presented by: Swedish Academy
- Reward: 12 million SEK (2026)
- First award: 1901; 125 years ago
- Most recent recipient: Anne Carson (2026)
- Website: nobelprize.org/literature

The Nobel Prize in Literature, here meaning for Literature (Swedish: Nobelpriset i litteratur), is a Swedish literature prize that is awarded annually to an author from any country who has, in the words of Alfred Nobel, "in the field of literature, produced the most outstanding work in an idealistic direction". Though individual works are sometimes cited as being particularly noteworthy, the award is based on an author's body of work as a whole. The Swedish Academy decides who, if anyone, will receive the prize.

The academy announces the name of the laureate in early October. It is one of the five Nobel Prizes established by the will of Alfred Nobel in 1895. Literature is traditionally the final award presented at the Nobel Prize ceremony. On some occasions, the award has been postponed to the following year, most recently in 2018.

== Background ==
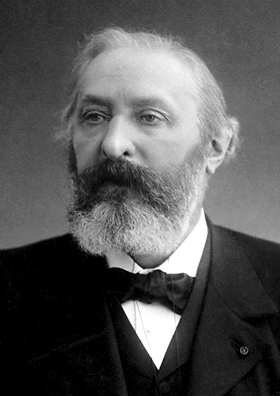
In 1901, French poet and essayist Sully Prudhomme (1839–1907) was the first person to be awarded the Nobel Prize in Literature, "in special recognition of his poetic composition, which gives evidence of lofty idealism, artistic perfection, and a rare combination of the qualities of both heart and intellect."

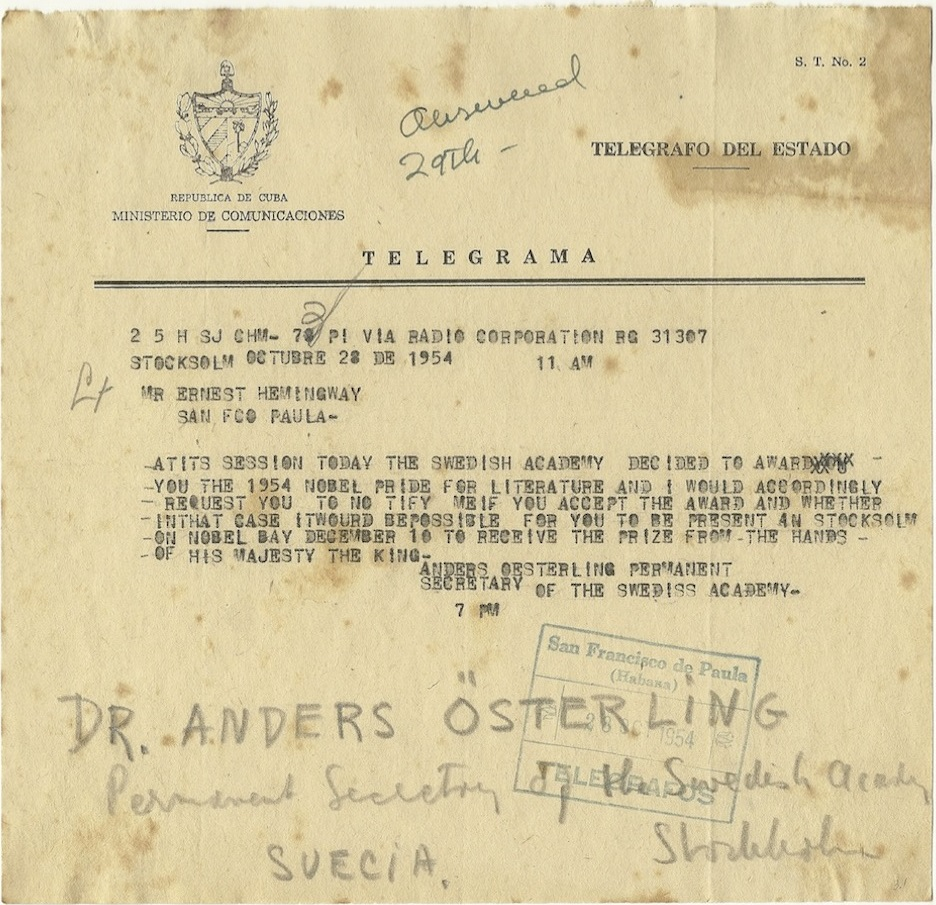
Hemingway's telegram in 1954 (The academy has alternately used for Literature and in Literature over the years, the latter becoming the norm today.)

Alfred Nobel stipulated in his last will and testament that his money be used to create a series of prizes for those who confer the "greatest benefit on mankind" in physics, chemistry, peace, physiology or medicine, and literature. Although Nobel wrote several wills during his lifetime, the last was written a little over a year before he died, and it was signed at the Swedish-Norwegian Club in Paris on 27 November 1895. Nobel bequeathed 94% of his total assets, 31 million Swedish kronor (US$198 million, €176 million in 2016), to establish and endow the five Nobel Prizes. Due to the level of scepticism surrounding the will, it was not until 26 April 1897 that the Storting (Norwegian Parliament) approved it. The executors of his will were Ragnar Sohlman and Rudolf Lilljequist, who formed the Nobel Foundation to take care of Nobel's fortune and organise the prizes.

The members of the Norwegian Nobel Committee that were to award the Peace Prize were appointed shortly after the will was approved. The prize-awarding organisations followed: the Karolinska Institutet on 7 June, the Swedish Academy on 9 June, and the Royal Swedish Academy of Sciences on 11 June. The Nobel Foundation then reached an agreement on guidelines for how the Nobel Prize should be awarded. In 1900, the Nobel Foundation's newly created statutes were promulgated by King Oscar II. According to Nobel's will, the prize in literature should be determined by "the Academy in Stockholm", which was specified by the statutes of the Nobel Foundation to mean the Swedish Academy.

== Nomination and award procedure ==
Each year, the Swedish Academy sends out requests for nominations of candidates for the Nobel Prize in Literature. Members of the Academy, members of literature academies and societies, professors of literature and language, former Nobel literature laureates, and the presidents of writers' organisations are all allowed to nominate a candidate. One cannot nominate oneself.

Between 1901 and 1950, around 20 to 35 nominations were usually received each year. Since then, thousands of requests are sent out each year, and as of 2011 about 220 proposals were returned. These proposals must be received by the Academy by 1 February, after which they are examined by the Nobel Committee, a working group within the Academy comprising four to five members. By April, the committee narrows the field to around 20 candidates. By May, a shortlist of five names is approved by the Academy. The next four months are spent reading and reviewing the works of the five candidates. In October, members of the Academy vote, and the candidate who receives more than half of the votes is named the Nobel laureate in Literature. No one can get the prize without being on the shortlist at least twice; thus, many authors reappear and are reviewed repeatedly over the years. The academicians read works in their original language, but when a candidate is shortlisted from a language that no member masters, they call on translators and oath-sworn experts to provide samples of that writer's work. Other elements of the process are similar to those of other Nobel Prizes. The Swedish Academy is composed of 18 members who are elected for life and, until 2018, not technically permitted to leave. On 2 May 2018, King Carl XVI Gustaf amended the rules of the academy and made it possible for members to resign. The new rules also mention that a member who has been inactive in the work of the academy for more than two years can be asked to resign. The members of the Nobel committee are elected for a period of three years from among the members of the academy and are assisted by specially appointed expert advisers.

The award is usually announced in October. Sometimes, however, the award has been announced the year after the nominal year, the latest such case being the 2018 award. In the midst of controversy surrounding claims of sexual assault, conflict of interest, and resignations by officials, on 4 May 2018, the Swedish Academy announced that the 2018 laureate would be announced in 2019 along with the 2019 laureate. Some years, such as in 1949, no candidate received the required majority of the votes, and for that reason, the prize was postponed and announced the following year.

=== Withdrawn, invalidated and unarchived nominations ===
Between 1901 and 1970, literary historians and archivists noted that there were official nominees who were either withdrawn, invalidated or not archived in the Academy's nomination database. In 1911, the Swedish playwright August Strindberg was nominated for the first time by Academy member Nathan Söderblom but because the nomination "arrived too late", it was withdrawn and unarchived unlike any other nominations that were moved to the succeeding year. In 1904, José Echegaray's nomination letter "arrived late due to slow mail service" and Rudyard Kipling's had been temporarily misplaced. It was then decided by the Nobel committee to include both the nominations for 1904 and not moved for 1905.

There have been nine recorded occasions when the nominations were declared invalid. The only nominations for Pedro Pablo Figueroa, Max Haushofer Jr., William Booth and Armando Alvares Pedroso were declared invalid by the Nobel committee because their respective nominators were found to be ineligible. Such declarations also occurred to Ernest Lavisse in 1911, Henriette Charasson in 1945, Teixeira de Pascoaes in 1945 and Enrique Larreta in 1945. Therefore, their names were withdrawn from the archives in those specific years. John Macmillan Brown's self-nomination under the pseudonym "Godfrey Sweven" was declared invalid due to the rule that nominations of oneself is impermissible.

Permanent Secretary of the Swedish Academy Anders Österling revealed to the New York Times days before the announcement that Willa Cather, together with Ernest Hemingway, John Steinbeck, and Gabriela Mistral, was among the contenders for the 1944 prize. Despite the revelation, Cather's name was not included in the archives. The prize was eventually given to Johannes V. Jensen.

== Prizes ==
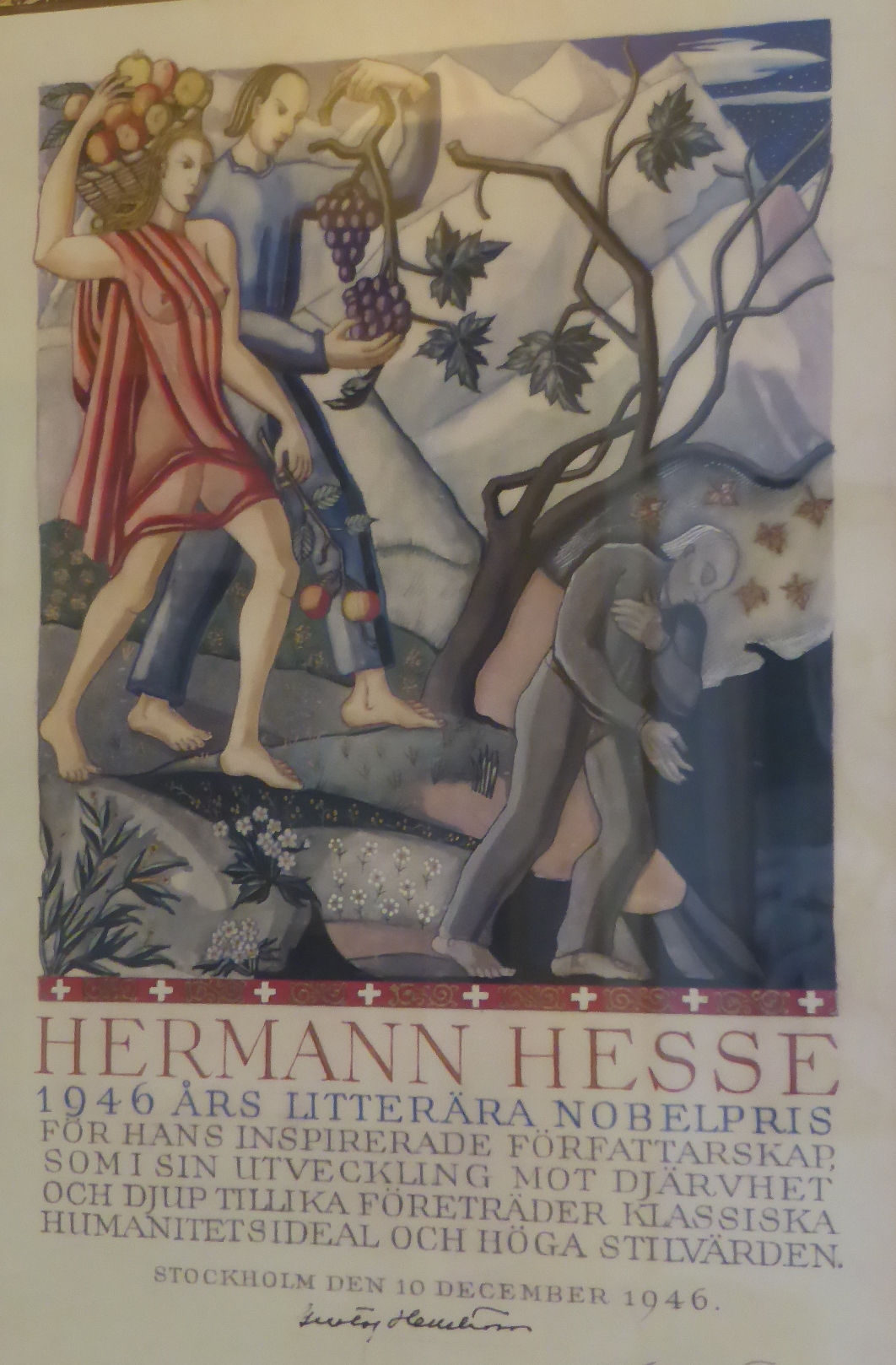
The Nobel diploma awarded to Hermann Hesse in 1946

A Literature Nobel Prize laureate receives a gold medal, a diploma bearing a citation, and a sum of money. The amount of money awarded depends on the income of the Nobel Foundation that year.

The literature prize can be shared between two, but not three, laureates. If a prize is awarded jointly, the prize money is split equally between them.

The prize money of the Nobel Prize has been fluctuating since its inauguration but as of 2026 it stood at kr 11,000,000 (about US$1,150,000); previously it was kr 10,000,000.

This was not the first time the prize amount was decreased—beginning with a nominal value of kr 150,782 in 1901 (worth 8,123,951 in 2011 SKr) the nominal value has been as low as kr 121,333 (2,370,660 in 2011 SKr) in 1945—but it has been uphill or stable since then, peaking at an SKr-2011 value of 11,659,016 in 2001.

The laureate is also invited to give a lecture during "Nobel Week" in Stockholm; the highlight is the prize-giving ceremony and banquet on 10 December. It is the third richest literary prize in the world.

=== Medals ===
The literature medal was designed by Erik Lindberg. It features a portrait of Alfred Nobel in left profile on the obverse; the reverse of the medal depicts a 'young man sitting under a laurel tree who, enchanted, listens to and writes down the song of the Muse'. It is inscribed "Inventas vitam iuvat excoluisse per artes" ("It is beneficial to have improved (human) life through discovered arts"), an adaptation of "inventas aut qui vitam excoluere per artes" from line 663 of book 6 of the Aeneid by the Roman poet Virgil. A plate below the figures is inscribed with the name of the recipient. The text "ACAD. SUEC." denoting the Swedish Academy is also inscribed on the reverse.

Between 1902 and 2010, the Nobel Prize medals were struck by the Myntverket, the Swedish royal mint, located in Eskilstuna. In 2011, the medals were made by the Det Norske Myntverket in Kongsberg. The medals have been made by Svenska Medalj in Eskilstuna since 2012.

=== Diplomas ===
Nobel laureates receive a diploma directly from the King of Sweden. Each diploma is uniquely designed by the prize-awarding institutions for the laureate who receives it. The diploma contains a picture and text that states the name of the laureate and normally a citation of why they received the prize.

== Laureates ==
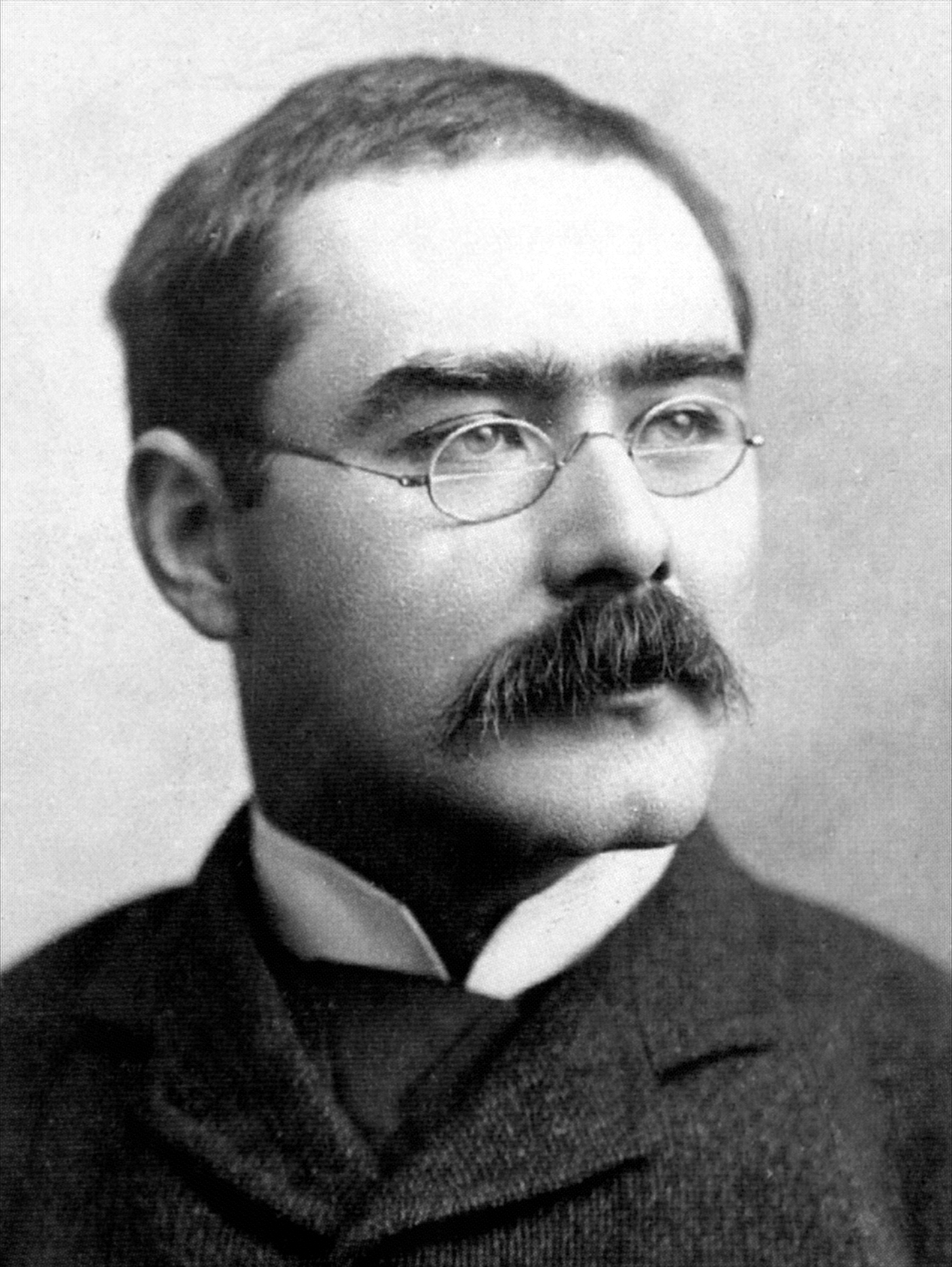
Rudyard Kipling, the youngest recipient of the Nobel Prize in Literature

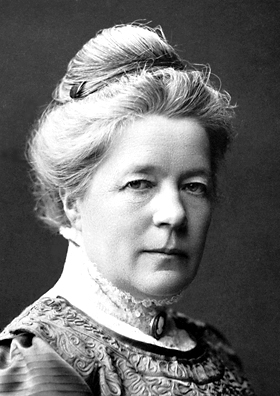
Selma Lagerlöf, the first female author awarded the prize

The Nobel Prize in Literature has been awarded 119 times between 1901 and 2026 to 123 individuals: 104 men and 19 women. The prize has been shared between two individuals on four occasions. It was not awarded on seven occasions. The laureates have included writers in 25 languages. The youngest laureate was Rudyard Kipling, who was 41 years old when he was awarded in 1907. The oldest laureate to receive the prize was Doris Lessing, who was 88 when she was awarded in 2007. It has been awarded posthumously once, to Erik Axel Karlfeldt in 1931. On some occasions, the awarding institution, the Swedish Academy, has awarded the prize to its own members; Verner von Heidenstam in 1916, the posthumous prize to Karlfeldt in 1931, Pär Lagerkvist in 1951, and the shared prize to Eyvind Johnson and Harry Martinson in 1974. Selma Lagerlöf was elected a member of the Swedish Academy in 1914, five years after she was awarded the Nobel Prize in 1909. Three writers have declined the prize, Erik Axel Karlfeldt in 1919, Boris Pasternak in 1958 ("Accepted first, later caused by the authorities of his country (Soviet Union) to decline the Prize", according to the Nobel Foundation) and Jean-Paul Sartre in 1964.

=== Interpretations of Nobel's guidelines ===
Alfred Nobel's guidelines for the prize, stating that the candidate should have bestowed "the greatest benefit on mankind" and written "in an idealistic direction," have sparked much discussion. In the early history of the prize, Nobel's "idealism" was read as "a lofty and sound idealism." The set of criteria, characterised by its conservative idealism, holding church, state, and family sacred, resulted in prizes for Bjørnstjerne Bjørnson, Rudyard Kipling, and Paul Heyse. During World War I, there was a policy of neutrality, which partly explains the number of awards to Scandinavian writers. In the 1920s, "idealistic direction" was interpreted more generously as "wide-hearted humanity," leading to awards for writers like Anatole France, George Bernard Shaw, and Thomas Mann. In the 1930s, "the greatest benefit on mankind" was interpreted as writers within every person's reach, with authors like Sinclair Lewis and Pearl Buck receiving recognition. In 1946, a renewed Academy changed focus and began to award literary pioneers like Hermann Hesse, André Gide, T. S. Eliot, and William Faulkner. During this era, "the greatest benefit on mankind" was interpreted in a more exclusive and generous way than before. Since the 1970s, the Academy has often given attention to important but internationally unnoticed writers, awarding writers like Elias Canetti and Jaroslav Seifert.

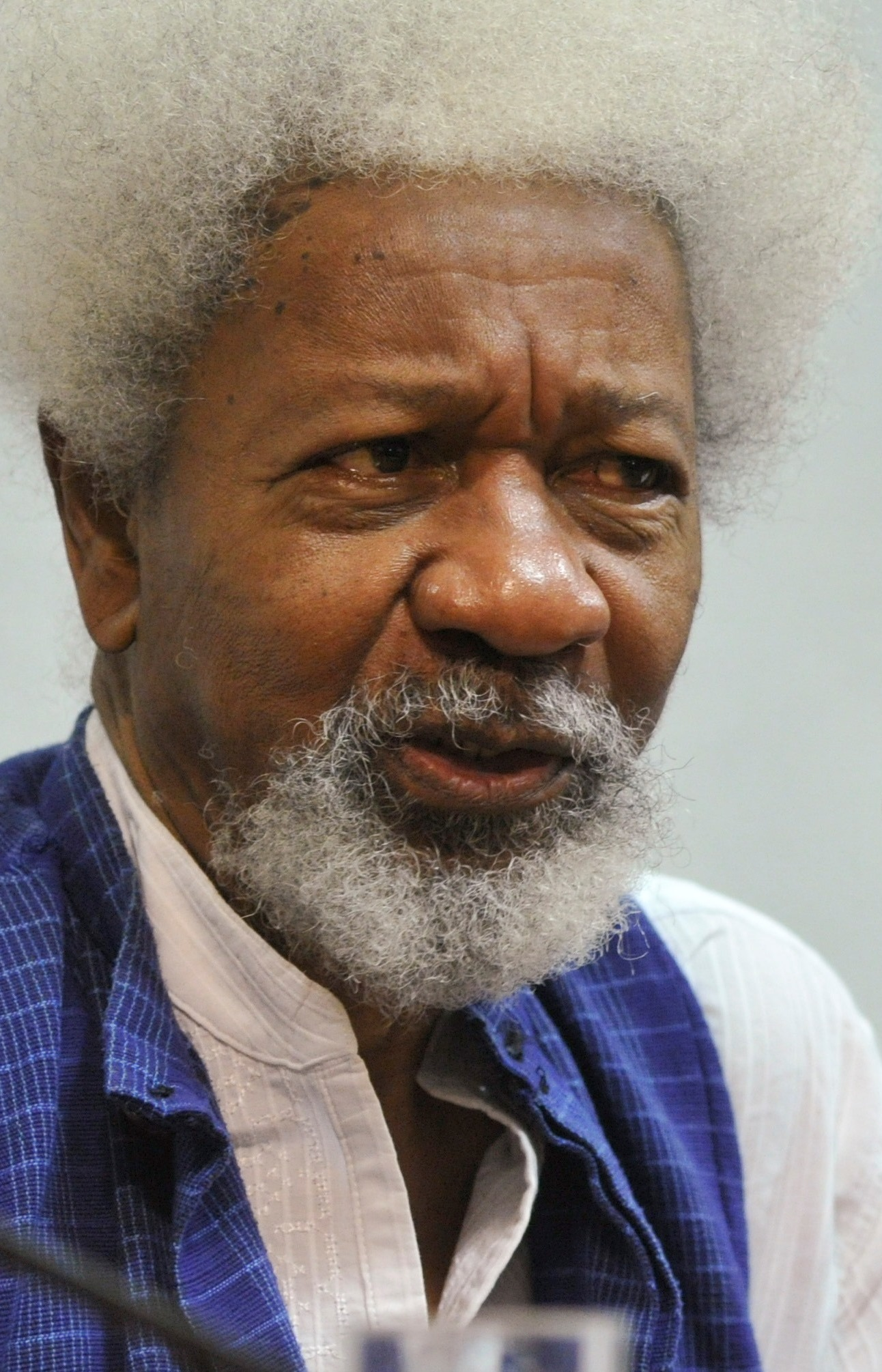
Wole Soyinka, the first Black African writer awarded the prize

Beginning in 1986, the Academy acknowledged the international aspect in Nobel's will, which rejected any consideration of the nationality of the candidates, and awarded authors from all over the world, such as Wole Soyinka from Nigeria, Naguib Mahfouz from Egypt, Octavio Paz from Mexico, Nadine Gordimer from South Africa, Derek Walcott from St. Lucia, Toni Morrison, the first African-American on the list, Kenzaburo Oe from Japan, and Gao Xingjian, the first laureate to write in Chinese. In the 2000s, V. S. Naipaul, Mario Vargas Llosa, and the Chinese writer Mo Yan have been awarded, but the policy of "a prize for the whole world" has been less noticeable as the Academy has mostly continued to award European and English-language writers from the Western literary tradition. In 2015, a rare prize to a non-fiction writer was awarded to Svetlana Alexievich.

=== Shared prize ===
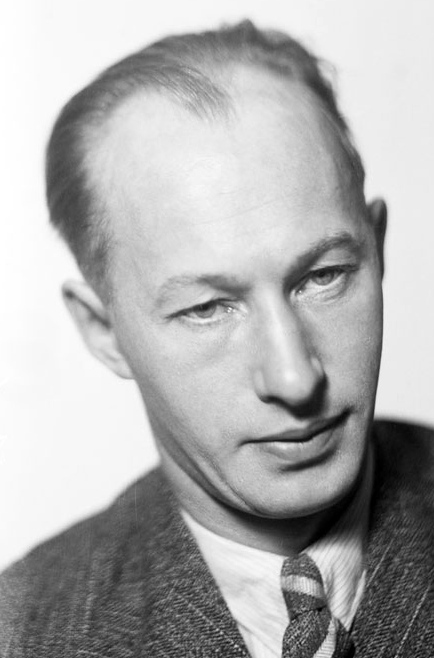
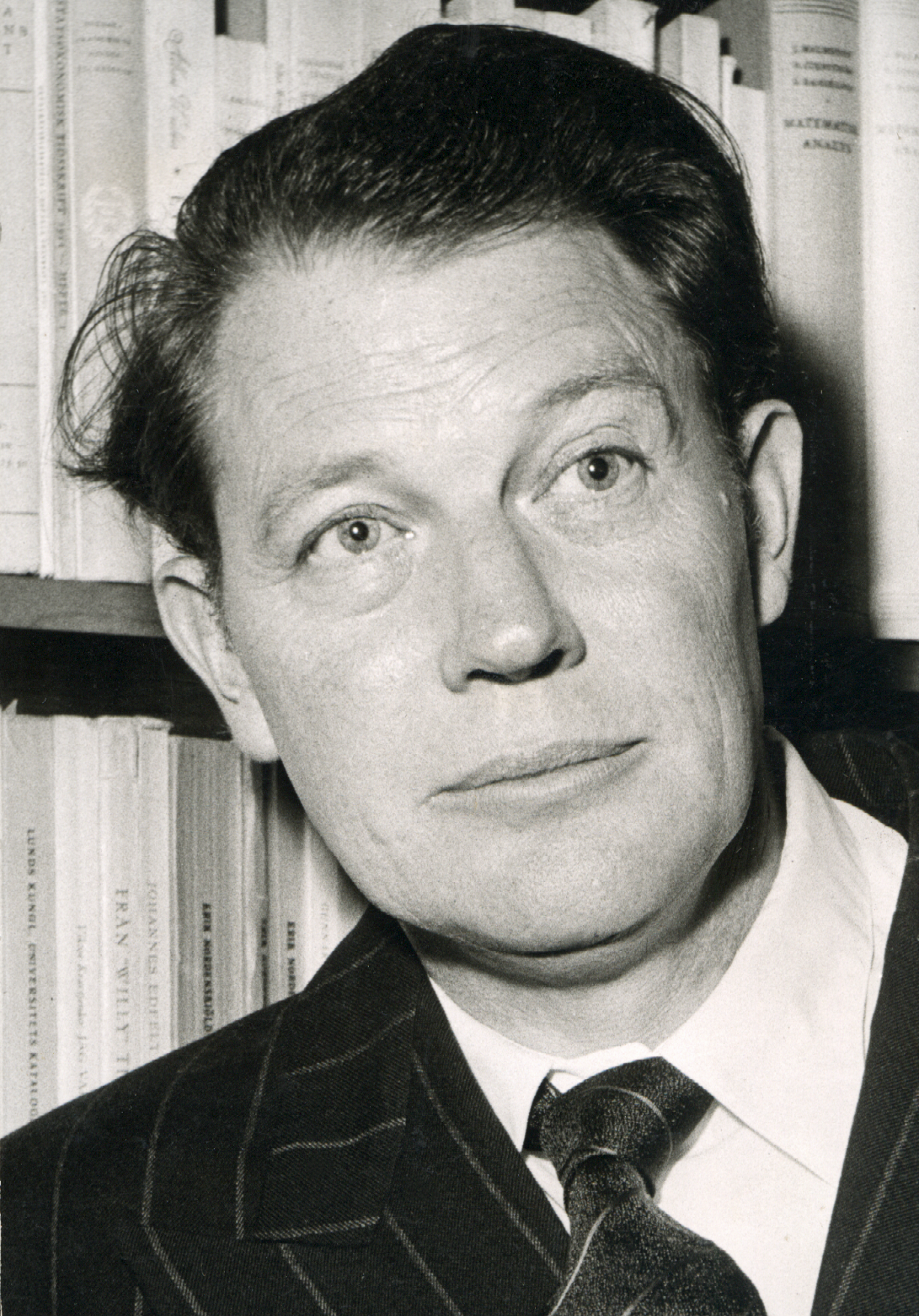
Eyvind Johnson and Harry Martinson were awarded a shared prize in 1974.

The Nobel Prize in Literature can be shared between two individuals. However, the Academy has been reluctant to award shared prizes, because divisions are liable to be interpreted as a result of a compromise. The shared prizes awarded to Frédéric Mistral and José Echegaray in 1904 and to Karl Gjellerup and Henrik Pontoppidan in 1917 were, in fact, both results of compromises. Shared prizes are exceptional, and more recently, the Academy has awarded a shared prize on only two occasions, to Shmuel Yosef Agnon and Nelly Sachs in 1966, and to Eyvind Johnson and Harry Martinson in 1974.

=== Recognition of a specific work ===
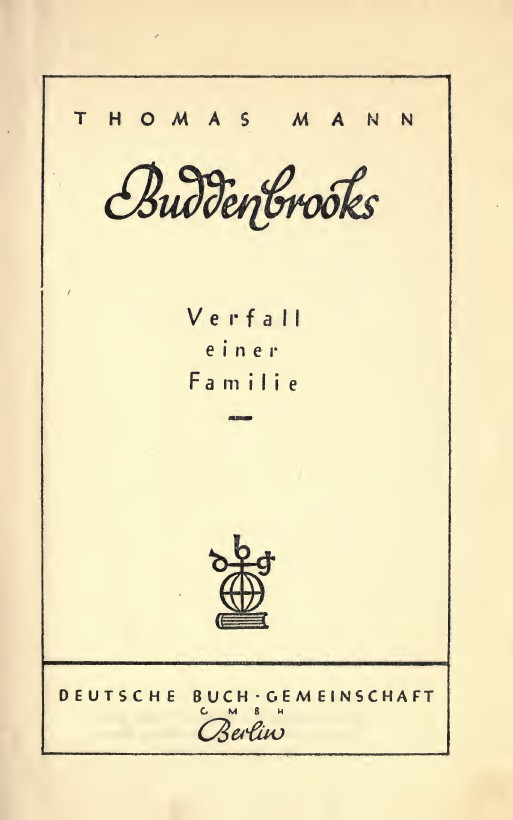
Thomas Mann's Buddenbrooks

Nobel Prize Laureates in Literature are awarded for the author's life work, but on some occasions, the Academy has singled out a specific work for particular recognition. For example, Knut Hamsun was awarded in 1920 "for his monumental work, Growth of the Soil"; Thomas Mann in 1929 "principally for his great novel, Buddenbrooks, which has won steadily increased recognition as one of the classic works of contemporary literature"; John Galsworthy in 1932 "for his distinguished art of narration which takes its highest form in The Forsyte Saga"; Roger Martin du Gard in 1937 "for the artistic power and truth with which he has depicted human conflict as well as some fundamental aspects of contemporary life in his novel-cycle Les Thibault"; Ernest Hemingway in 1954 "for his mastery of the art of narrative, most recently demonstrated in The Old Man and the Sea; and for the influence that he has exerted on contemporary style"; and Mikhail Sholokhov in 1965 "for the artistic power and integrity with which, in his epic of the Don, he has given expression to a historic phase in the life of the Russian people".

=== Potential candidates ===
Nominations are kept secret for at least 50 years before they are publicly available at The Nomination Database for the Nobel Prize in Literature. As of 2025, only nominations submitted between 1901 and 1973 are available for public viewing.

What about the rumours circling around the world about certain people being nominated for the Nobel Prize this year? – Well, either it's just a rumour, or someone among the invited nominators has leaked information. Since the nominations are kept secret for 50 years, you'll have to wait until then to find out.

— Nomination FAQ – Frequently Asked Questions about the Nomination and Selection of Nobel Laureates

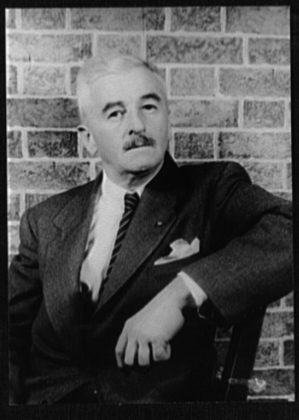
William Faulkner, one of the authors who were instantly awarded after just one nomination

Nominated candidates are usually considered by the Nobel committee for years, but it has happened on a number of occasions that an author has been instantly awarded after just one nomination. Apart from the first laureate in 1901, Sully Prudhomme, these include Theodor Mommsen in 1902, Rudolf Eucken in 1908, Paul Heyse in 1910, Rabindranath Tagore in 1913, Sinclair Lewis in 1930, Luigi Pirandello in 1934, Pearl Buck in 1938, William Faulkner in 1950 (the prize for 1949) and Bertrand Russell in 1950.

Former recipients of the Nobel Prize in Literature are allowed to nominate their candidates for the prize and sometimes their proposals have subsequently been awarded the prize. The 1912 laureate Gerhart Hauptmann nominated Verner von Heidenstam (awarded in 1916) and Thomas Mann (awarded in 1929), the 1915 laureate Romain Rolland proposed Ivan Bunin (awarded in 1933), Thomas Mann nominated Hermann Hesse (awarded in 1946) in 1931, the 1951 laureate Pär Lagerkvist was proposed by both André Gide and Roger Martin du Gard, and the 1960 laureate Saint-John Perse was nominated several times by the 1948 laureate T. S. Eliot.

== Media attention ==
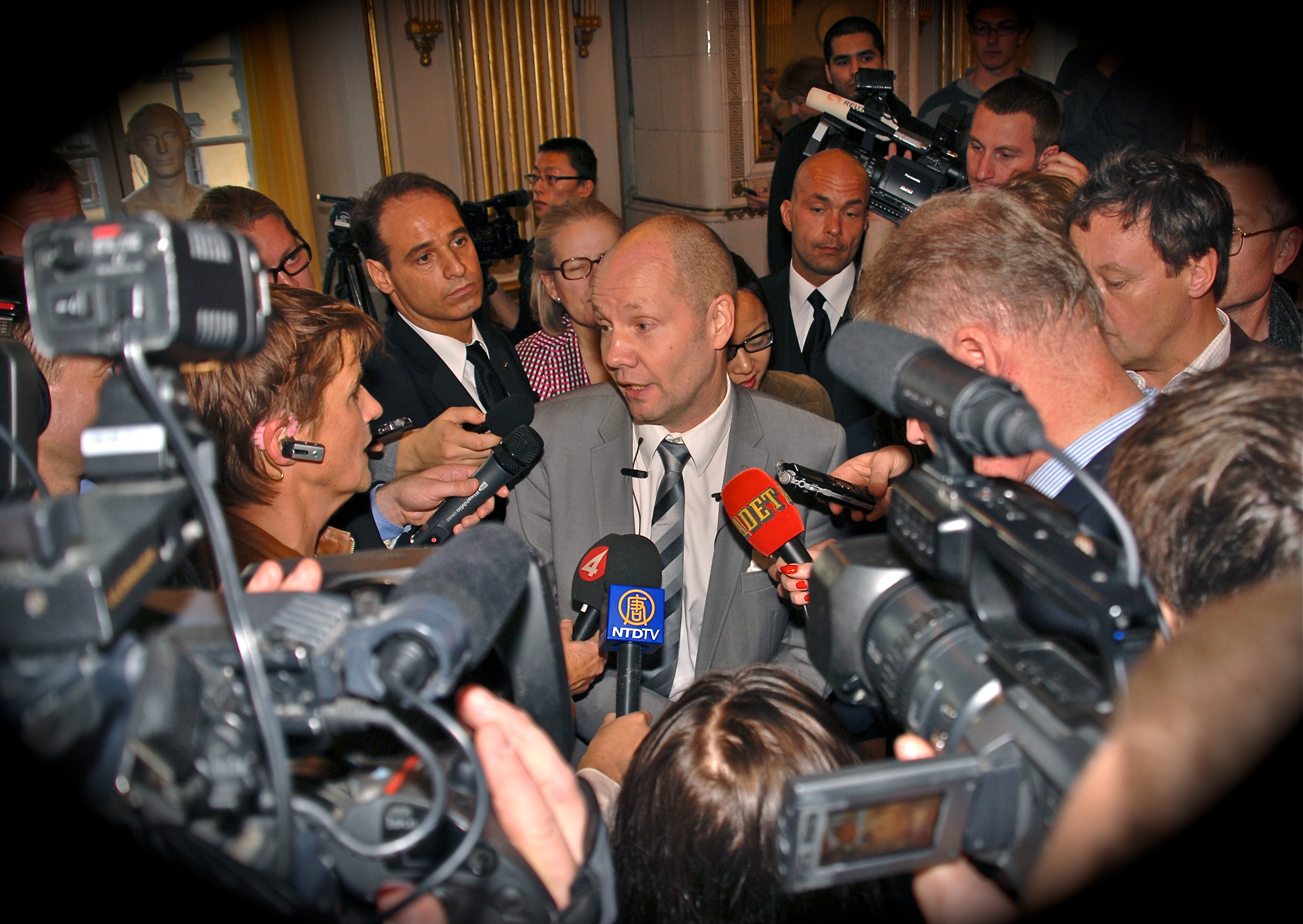
The Swedish Academy's permanent secretary Peter Englund at the announcement of the 2010 Nobel Prize in Literature

From the start the Nobel Prize in Literature attracted much media attention. The first prize in 1901 was reported in hundreds of newspapers in different parts of the world. The prizes to Rudyard Kipling in 1907 and Rabindranath Tagore in 1913 helped to establish the prize as a central phenomenon in world literature. After World War II, the prize has earned more intense media attention with dramatic news reports and in-depth comments from around the world, further establishing its central position in the global literary space. Days before the announcement of the year's Nobel laureate in Literature, potential winners are widely guessed in the media, and controversial and surprising choices have often caused much media discussion.

== Criticism ==
Although the Nobel Prize in Literature is widely regarded as the world's most prestigious literary prize, the Swedish Academy has attracted significant criticism for its handling of the award.

Many authors who have won the prize have fallen into obscurity, while others rejected by the jury remain widely studied and read. In the Wall Street Journal, Joseph Epstein wrote, "You might not know it, but you and I are members of a club whose fellow members include Leo Tolstoy, Henry James, Anton Chekhov, Mark Twain, Henrik Ibsen, Marcel Proust, James Joyce, Jorge Luis Borges and Vladimir Nabokov. The club is the Non-Winners of the Nobel Prize in Literature. All these authentically great writers, still alive when the prize, initiated in 1901, was being awarded, didn't win it."

Other notable names from the non-western canon who were ignored despite being nominated several times for the prize include Sri Aurobindo and Sarvepalli Radhakrishnan. The prize has "become widely seen as a political one – a peace prize in literary disguise", whose judges are prejudiced against authors with political tastes different from theirs.

Tim Parks has expressed skepticism that it is possible for "Swedish professors ... [to] compar[e] a poet from Indonesia, perhaps translated into English with a novelist from Cameroon, perhaps available only in French, and another who writes in Afrikaans but is published in German and Dutch...".

The Academy has often been alleged to be biased towards European, and in particular Swedish, authors. As of 2021, 16 of the 118 recipients have been of Scandinavian origin.

Nobel's "vague" wording for the criteria for the prize has led to recurrent controversy. In the original Swedish, the word idealisk translates as "ideal." The Nobel Committee's interpretation has varied over the years. In recent years, this means a kind of idealism championing human rights on a broad scale.

=== Controversies about Nobel laureate selections ===
From 1901 to 1912, the committee, led by the conservative Carl David af Wirsén, assessed the literary quality of a work in relation to its contribution to humanity's pursuit of the "ideal." Leo Tolstoy, Henrik Ibsen, Émile Zola, and Mark Twain were rejected in favour of authors who mostly are little read today.

Later, the prize has often been controversial due to the Swedish Academy's Eurocentric choices of laureates, or for political reasons, as seen in the years 1970, 2005, and 2019, and for the Academy awarding its own members, as happened in 1974.

=== Nationality-based criticism ===
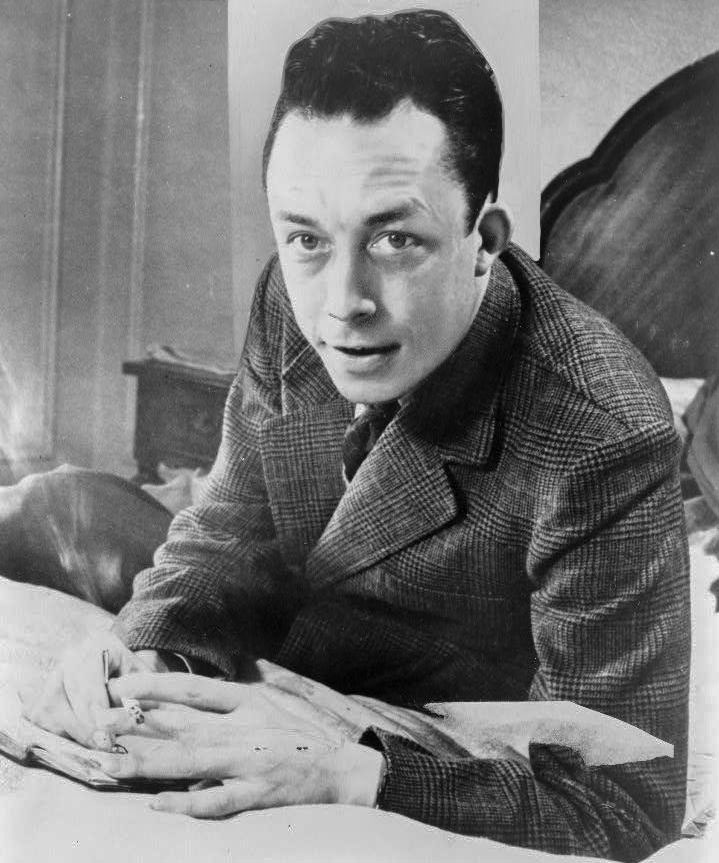
French author Albert Camus was the first African-born writer to receive the award.

The prize's focus on European men, and Swedes in particular, has been the subject of criticism, even from Swedish newspapers. The majority of laureates have been European, with Sweden itself receiving more prizes (8) than all of Asia (7, if Turkish Orhan Pamuk is included), as well as all of Latin America (7, if Saint Lucian Derek Walcott is included). In 2009, Horace Engdahl, then the permanent secretary of the Academy, declared that "Europe still is the centre of the literary world" and that "the US is too isolated, too insular. They don't translate enough and don't really participate in the big dialogue of literature."

In 2009, Engdahl's replacement, Peter Englund, rejected this sentiment ("In most language areas ... there are authors that really deserve and could get the Nobel Prize and that goes for the United States and the Americas, as well") and acknowledged the Eurocentric nature of the award, saying that, "I think that is a problem. We tend to relate more easily to literature written in Europe and in the European tradition." American critics are known to object that those from their own country, like Philip Roth, Thomas Pynchon, and Cormac McCarthy, have been overlooked, as have Latin Americans such as Jorge Luis Borges, Julio Cortázar, and Carlos Fuentes, while in their place Europeans lesser-known to that continent have triumphed. The 2009 award to Herta Müller, previously little-known outside Germany but many times named favourite for the Nobel Prize, re-ignited the viewpoint that the Swedish Academy was biased and Eurocentric.

The 2010 prize was awarded to Mario Vargas Llosa, a native of Peru in South America, a generally well-regarded decision. When the 2011 prize was awarded to the Swedish poet Tomas Tranströmer, permanent secretary of the Swedish Academy Peter Englund said the prize was not decided based on politics, describing such a notion as "literature for dummies." The Swedish Academy awarded the next two prizes to non-Europeans, Chinese author Mo Yan and Canadian short story writer Alice Munro. French writer Patrick Modiano's win in 2014 renewed questions of Eurocentrism; when asked by The Wall Street Journal "So no American this year, yet again. Why is that?", Englund reminded Americans of the Canadian origins of the previous year's recipient, the Academy's desire for literary quality and the impossibility of rewarding everyone who deserves the prize.

== Similar international prizes ==
The Nobel Prize in Literature is not the only literary prize for which all nationalities are eligible. Other notable international literary prizes include the Neustadt International Prize for Literature, the Jerusalem Prize, Franz Kafka Prize, the International Booker Prize, and the Formentor Prix International. The journalist Hephzibah Anderson has noted that the International Booker Prize "is fast becoming the more significant award, appearing an ever more competent alternative to the Nobel". However, since 2016, the International Booker Prize now recognises an annual book of fiction translated into English. Previous winners of the International Booker Prize who have gone on to win the Nobel Prize in Literature include Alice Munro, Olga Tokarczuk, and Han Kang.

The Neustadt International Prize for Literature is regarded as one of the most prestigious international literary prizes, often referred to as the American equivalent of the Nobel Prize. Like the Nobel Prize, it is awarded not for any one work but for an entire body of work. It is frequently seen as an indicator of who may be awarded the Nobel Prize in Literature. Gabriel García Márquez (1972 Neustadt, 1982 Nobel), Czesław Miłosz (1978 Neustadt, 1980 Nobel), Octavio Paz (1982 Neustadt, 1990 Nobel), Tomas Tranströmer (1990 Neustadt, 2011 Nobel) were first awarded the Neustadt International Prize for Literature before being awarded the Nobel Prize in Literature.

Another award of note is the Spanish Princess of Asturias Award (formerly Prince of Asturias Award) in Letters. During the first years of its existence it was almost exclusively awarded to writers in the Spanish language, but in more recent times, writers in other languages have been awarded as well. Writers who have won both the Asturias Award in Letters and the Nobel Prize in Literature include Camilo José Cela, Günter Grass, Doris Lessing, and Mario Vargas Llosa.

The non-monetary America Award in Literature presents itself as an alternative to the Nobel Prize. Peter Handke, Harold Pinter, José Saramago, and Mario Vargas Llosa are the only writers to have received both the America Award and the Nobel Prize in Literature.

There are also prizes for honouring the lifetime achievement of writers in specific languages, like the Miguel de Cervantes Prize (for Spanish language, established in 1976) and the Camões Prize (for Portuguese language, established in 1989). Nobel laureates who were also awarded the Miguel de Cervantes Prize include Octavio Paz (1981 Cervantes, 1990 Nobel); Mario Vargas Llosa (1994 Cervantes, 2010 Nobel); and Camilo José Cela (1995 Cervantes, 1989 Nobel). José Saramago is the only author to receive both the Camões Prize (1995) and the Nobel Prize (1998) to date.

The Hans Christian Andersen Award is sometimes referred to as "the Little Nobel". The award has earned this appellation since, in a similar manner to the Nobel Prize in Literature, it recognises the lifetime achievement of writers, though the Andersen Award focuses on a single category of literary works (children's literature).

== See also ==
- List of Nobel laureates in Literature
- List of nominees for the Nobel Prize in Literature
- List of Nobel laureates
- The Big Read
- List of literary awards
- Lists of 100 best books
- Nobel Library
- Swedish Academy Nordic Prize
- World literature
