= Elias Wessén =

Swedish linguist (1889–1981)

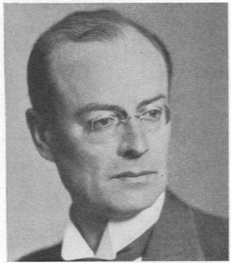
Elias Wessén

Elias Wessén (15 April 1889 – 30 January 1981) was a prominent Swedish linguist and a professor of Scandinavian languages at Stockholm University (1928–1956). In 1947, he was honoured with seat 16 in the Swedish Academy, which he held until his death.

His earliest work concerned morphological problems in the Germanic languages, Onomasiology and Norse mythology. He published parts of Sveriges runinskrifter, editions of medieval texts and together with Åke Holmbäck, a translation of the Swedish medieval province laws (with commentaries). He published several reference works, such as Svensk språkhistoria in three tomes, and a grammar for modern Swedish Vårt svenska språk. In 1944, he initiated Nämnden för svensk språkvård (nowadays Språkrådet, the Swedish Language Council).

Cultural offices
Preceded by Tor Andræ	Swedish Academy, Seat No 16; 1947–1981	Succeeded by Kjell Espmark
