= Richard Beck (scholar) =

American literary historian and author

- Born: June 9, 1897; Svínaskálastekkur, Reyðarfjörður, Iceland
- Died: July 20, 1980 (aged 83); Victoria, British Columbia, Canada
- Education: Cornell University
- Spouses: Olöf Daníelsdóttir (m. 1920; died 1921) Bertha Una Samson (m. 1925; died 1958) Jacobina Einarsdottir Brandson (m. 1961–1980)
- Children: 2
- Scientific career
- Fields: Literary history
- Institutions: St. Olaf College; Thiel College; University of North Dakota

Richard Beck (June 9, 1897 – July 20, 1980) was an Icelandic-born American literary historian, author, and poet. He was for many years a professor of Scandinavian languages and literature at the University of North Dakota and a prominent leader of the Icelandic American community.

== Biography ==
Richard Beck was born at Svínaskálastekkur in Reyðarfjörður, Iceland on June 9, 1897. His parents, Hans Kjartan Beck and Thorunn Vigfúsina Vigfúsdóttir, lived in Litlu-Breidavik at Reyðarfjörður. His father died in December 1907 while Richard was still a boy. Graduating from high school in Reykjavík in 1920, Beck married Olöf Daníelsdóttir on October 10, 1920. She died on March 22, 1921. Shortly afterwards Beck and his widowed mother emigrated to Winnipeg, Canada.

In 1922 Beck entered Cornell University to study English and Scandinavian languages and literature. Here he received his M.A. in 1924, and his Ph.D. in 1926. His Ph.D. thesis was on the English poet John Milton and his Icelandic translator Jón Þorláksson. Beck taught at St. Olaf College in Northfield, Minnesota from 1926 to 1928, and at Thiel College in Greenville, Pennsylvania from 1928 to 1929.

In 1929 he joined the staff of the University of North Dakota. Here he became a professor of Scandinavian languages and literature. He served as head of the department of modern and classical languages there for nine years. Beck retired from the University of North Dakota in 1967.

Throughout his career, Beck published more than fifteen books, including several works of poetry, and more than five hundred articles. He received plenty of honors for his work, including an honorary doctor of literature degree from the University of North Dakota and two honorary doctorates from the University of Iceland. He was the president of the Society for the Advancement of Scandinavian Study in 1940–1942, 1950–1951 and 1957–1958.

Throughout his life, Beck was very active in Icelandic and other Scandinavian organizations. Beck was invited to speak in Iceland on June 17, 1944, the date on which the Icelandic Republic was founded. He later served as Honorary Consul of Iceland for North Dakota and President of the Icelandic National League of North America. Beck was a special guest of the Icelandic government for the 1969 celebration of the 25th anniversary of the founding of the Icelandic Republic and the 1974 celebration of the 1,100th anniversary of the settlement of Iceland.

Beck married Bertha Una Samson in Ithaca, New York on April 9, 1925, with whom he had two children. Bertha died on October 21, 1958. He married Margaret Jacobina Einarsdottir Brandson in June 1961. She was the daughter of a family of Icelandic pioneers in Victoria, British Columbia.

Beck moved to Victoria, British Columbia in 1967 after his retirement. He died at Victoria General Hospital on July 20, 1980. He was survived by his wife, two children and many grandchildren. His extensive collection of Scandinavian literature was donated to the University of Victoria following his death.

== Selected works ==
- History of Icelandic Poets 1800–1940, 1950
