= Jón Helgason (poet) =

Icelandic philologist and poet

Jón Helgason (June 30, 1899 – January 19, 1986) was an Icelandic philologist and poet. He was head of the Danish Árni Magnússon Institute for Icelandic Studies from 1927 to 1972 and professor of Icelandic studies at the University of Copenhagen from 1929 to 1969. He made significant contributions to his field. As a poet, he was not prolific but noted for his highly polished and effective traditional poetry. His best-known poems are Áfangar and Í Árnasafni.

One of his discoveries at the institute is the pair of glossaries that are the only documentation on Basque–Icelandic pidgin.

In 1923, he married Þórunn Ástriður Björnsdóttir (1895–1966) and in 1975 married Agnete Loth (1921-1990).
