= 1956 Nobel Prize in Literature =

- Juan Ramón Jiménez
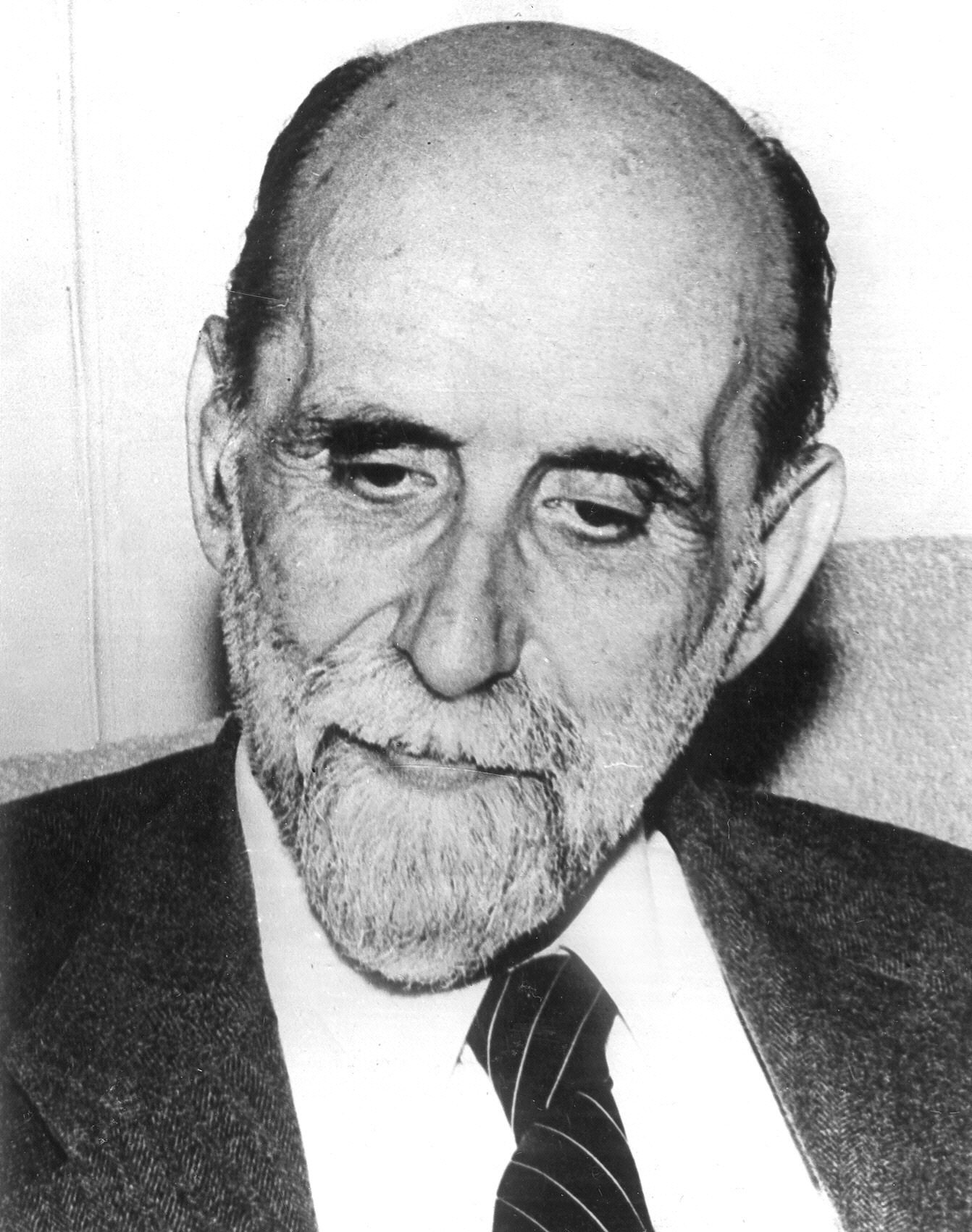
- "for his lyrical poetry, which in Spanish language constitutes an example of high spirit and artistical purity."
- Date: 25 October 1956 (announcement); 10 December 1956 (ceremony)
- Location: Stockholm, Sweden
- Presented by: Swedish Academy
- First award: 1901
- Website: Official website

The 1956 Nobel Prize in Literature was awarded to the Spanish poet Juan Ramón Jiménez (1881–1958) "for his lyrical poetry, which in Spanish language constitutes an example of high spirit and artistical purity" He is the third Spanish recipient of the prize after the dramatist Jacinto Benavente in 1922.

== Laureate ==
Juan Ramón Jiménez belonged to the literary movement called modernismo. His early poetry was inspired by German romanticism and French symbolism that is visual and full of imagery and predominated by the colors yellow and green. Then he later turned to poetic prose in which the color white predominates; this is clearly evident in Diario de un poeta recién casado ("Diary of a Recently Married Poet", 1917). Jimenez worked as a poet, literary critic and editor of a literary magazine. Among his famous poem collections include Platero y yo ("Platero and I", 1956), Piedra y cielo ("Stones and Sky", 1919), and Voces de mi copla ("Voices of My Song", 1945)

== Deliberations ==
=== Nominations ===
Jiménez was first nominated in 1952 before being awarded the 1956 Nobel Prize in Literature. Each year he received a single nomination, summing up to 5 nominations in all. His last nomination was made by the Swedish academy member, Harry Martinson.

In total, the Nobel committee received 158 nominations for 44 writers. Among the nominees include Graham Greene, Nikos Kazantzakis, André Malraux, Albert Camus (awarded in 1957), Zalman Shneour, Johan Falkberget, Ezra Pound, and Giuseppe Ungaretti. The most nominations were for Ramón Menéndez Pidal with 95 nominations, but was not awarded. Seventeen of the nominees were nominated first-time including Henry de Montherlant, Jorge Luis Borges, Marcel Pagnol, Gabriel Marcel, Gonzague de Reynold, Pablo Neruda (awarded in 1971), and Jules Supervielle. Four of the nominees were women: Melpo Axioti, Elizabeth Goudge, Marthe Bibesco, and Karen Blixen.

The authors Pío Baroja, Devorah Baron, Edmund Clerihew Bentley, Louis Bromfield, Carlos Bulosan, Ion Călugăru, Owen Davis, Alexander Fadeyev, Reşat Nuri Güntekin, Sheila Kaye-Smith, Yakub Kolas, Paul Léautaud, Louis Madelin, Henry Louis Mencken, Alan Alexander Milne, Leonora Speyer, Michael Ventris, Samad Vurgun, and Robert Walser died in 1956 without having been nominated for the prize. German playwright Bertolt Brecht died before the only chance to be rewarded.

Official list of nominees and their nominators for the prize
No.	Nominee	Country	Genre(s)	Nominator(s)
1	Mark Aldanov (1886–1957)	Soviet Union (Ukraine); France	biography, novel, essays, literary criticism	Samson Soloveitchik (1887–1974)
2	Melpo Axioti (1905–1973)	Greece	novel, short story, poetry	André Bonnard (1888–1959)
3	Eugène Baie (1874–1964)	Belgium	law, essays	Royal Academy of Science, Letters and Fine Arts of Belgium; Nils Ahnlund (1889–1957)
4	Gottfried Benn (1886–1956)	West Germany	poetry, essays	Ernst Alker (1895–1972)
5	Marthe Bibesco (1886–1973)	Romania; France	novel, poetry, memoir	Marie-Jeanne Durry (1901–1980); Fernand Desonay (1899–1973); Henri Davignon (1879–1964); Auguste-Armand de la Force (1878–1961)
6	Karen Blixen (1885–1962)	Denmark	novel, short story, memoir	Birger Ekeberg (1880–1968); Nils Ahnlund (1889–1957)
7	Jorge Luis Borges (1899–1986)	Argentina	poetry, essays, translation, short story	René Étiemble (1909–2002)
8	Henri Bosco (1888–1976)	France	novel, short story	Raymond Las Vergnas (1902–1994)
9	Bertolt Brecht (1898–1956)	East Germany	drama, screenplay, poetry, novel, essays	André Bonnard (1888–1959)
10	Albert Camus (1913–1960)	France (Algeria)	novel, short story, essays, philosophy, drama	Bo Bergman (1869–1967); Birger Ekeberg (1880–1968)
11	Hans Carossa (1878–1956)	West Germany	poetry, autobiography, essays	Maurice Le Boucher (1882–1964)
12	Francesco Chiesa (1871–1973)	Switzerland	poetry, short story, essays	Henri de Ziégler (1885–1970); Giovanni Laini (1899–1985)
13	Henry de Montherlant (1895–1972)	France	essays, novel, drama	Henri Morier (1910–2004)
14	Gonzague de Reynold (1880–1970)	Switzerland	history, essays, biography, memoir	Pierre-Henri Simon (1903–1972)
15	Georges Duhamel (1884–1966)	France	novel, short story, poetry, drama, literary criticism	Jean Carrière (1928–2005); Pierre Jourda (1898–1978); Odette Bornand (1924–2009); Jacqueline Duchemin (1910–1988); Jean François-Anatole Ricci (–)
16	Johan Falkberget (1879–1967)	Norway	novel, short story, essays	Harald Beyer (1891–1960)
17	Lion Feuchtwanger (1884–1958)	Germany	novel, drama	Walter Arthur Berendsohn (1884–1984)
18	Edward Morgan Forster (1879–1970)	United Kingdom	novel, short story, drama, essays, biography, literary criticism	Pierre Legouis (1891–1973)
19	Christopher Fry (1907–2005)	United Kingdom	poetry, drama, screenplay	Werner Kohlschmidt (1904–1983)
20	Graham Greene (1904–1991)	United Kingdom	novel, short story, autobiography, essays	Kristian Smidt (1916–2013); Hans Walter Häusermann (1902–1973)
21	Armand Godoy (1880–1964)	Cuba; France	poetry, translation	Antonio Iraizoz Villar (1890–1976)
22	Elizabeth Goudge (1900–1984)	United Kingdom	novel, short story, biography, autobiography	Edmond Privat (1889–1962)
23	Jean Guitton (1901–1999)	France	philosophy, theology	Édouard Delebecque (1910–1990)
24	Juan Ramón Jiménez (1881–1958)	Spain	poetry, novel	Harry Martinson (1904–1978)
25	Ernst Jünger (1895–1998)	West Germany	philosophy, novel, memoir	Maurice Le Boucher (1882–1964)
26	Nikos Kazantzakis (1883–1957)	Greece	novel, philosophy, essays, drama, memoir, translation	Samuel Baud-Bovy (1906–1986); Johannes Andreasson Dale (1898–1975); Society of Men of Letters of Greece
27	André Malraux (1901–1976)	France	novel, essays, literary criticism	Marius-François Guyard (1921–2011); Pierre-Georges Castex (1915–1995); Marcel Ruff (1896–1993)
28	Gabriel Marcel (1889–1973)	France	philosophy, drama	Jules-Augustin Bizet (1908–1977)
29	Ramón Menéndez Pidal (1869–1968)	Spain	philology, history	Ángel Rosenblat (1902–1984); 9 professors at the Central University of Venezuela; José Ramón de Ayala Duarte (1878–1966); Mariano Picón Salas (1901–1965); William Fortune Smith (1931–2016); María Concepción Zardoya (1914–2004); Raymond Smith Willis (1906–1991); Tomás Navarro Tomás (1884–1979); Amelia Agostini de Del Río (1896–1996); Joaquín Casalduero (1903–1990); Norman Torrey (1894–1980); Vicente Gaos (1919–1980); Ernesto Guerra Da Cal (1911–1994); Hispanic Society of America; Francisco Sánchez-Castañer (1908–1981); Harry Kurz (1889–1973); John Joseph Spagnoli (1914–2008); René Taupin (1905–1981); Maír José Benardete (1895–1989); Ángel del Río (1900–1962); Leo Spitzer (1887–1960); Edwin Morby (1909–1985); Juan López-Morillas (1913–1997); Raimundo Lida (1908–1979); Sylvanus Griswold Morley (1896–1969); William Fichter (1892–1985); Joan Coromines (1905–1997); María Rosa Lida de Malkiel (1910–1962); Yakov Malkiel (1914–1998); Edmund Schramm (1902–1974); Erich von Richthofen (1913–1988); Hans Rheinfelder (1898–1971); Günther Reichenkron (1907–1966); Fritz Neubert (1886–1970); Harri Meier (1905–1990); Wilhelm Neuss (1880–1965); Erhard Lommatzsch (1886–1975); Wilhelm Kellermann (1907–1980); Rudolf Großmann (1882–1941); Hugo Friedrich (1904–1978); Hans Flasche (1911–1994); Khalil Mardam Bey (1895–1959); Gunnar Tilander (1894–1973); Manuel Muñoz Cortés (1915–2000); Ángel Valbuena Prat (1900–1977); Mariano Baquero Goyanes (1923–1984); Luciano de la Calzada Rodríguez (1909–1974); Alonso Zamora Vicente (1916–2006); 16 members of the Real Academia de la Historia; Alfredo Kindelán (1879–1962); Gabriel Maura (1879–1963); Luis Redonet López-Dóriga (1875–1972); Rafael Benítez Claros (1919–1972); Emilio Alarcos Llorach (1922–1998); Martí de Riquer i Morera (1914–2013); 14 professors at the University of Barcelona; Antoni Maria Badia i Margarit (1920–2014); Antonio Llorente Maldonado (1922–1998); Antonio Gallego Morell (1923–2009); Emilio Orozco Díaz (1909–1987); Manuel Alvar (1923–2001); Emilio Alarcos García (1895–1986); Vicente Palacio Atard (1920–2013); Juan José Martín González (1923–2009); Alfonso Corral Castanedo (1921–2014); Francisco Ynduráin (1910–1994); professors at the University of Sevilla; 12 professors of the National Hispanic Institute; Joan Maluquer de Motes (1915–1988); Ramon d'Abadal i de Vinyals (1888–1970); 13 members of the Royal Spanish Academy; Gerardo Diego (1896–1987); Melchor Fernández Almagro (1893–1966); Rafael Lapesa (1908–2001); Vicente García de Diego (1878–1978); Julio Casares (1877–1964); Royal Swedish Academy of Letters, History and Antiquities; Walther von Wartburg (1888–1971); Ramon Sugranyes de Franch (1911–2011); Academia Salvadoreña de la Lengua; Júlio Dantas (1876–1962); Nobumoto Ōhama (1891–1976); Fukutarō Okui (1939–1965); Fouad Ephrem Boustany (1904–1994); Angelo Monteverdi (1886–1967); Alfonsina Braun (1906–1970); Felice Battaglia (1902–1977); Edward Riley (1933–2001); Jonas Andries van Praag (1895–1969); Aurelio Viñas (1892–1958); Robert Ricard (1900–1984); William Nitze (1876–1957); Pierre Le Gentil (1906–1989); Elie Lambert (1888–1961); Raymond Cantel (1914–1986); Veikko Väänänen (1905–1997); Manuel Briones (1893–1957); Philippine Academy of the Spanish Language; Edward Meryon Wilson (1906–1977); Albert Sloman (1921–2012); Peter Edward Lionel Russell (1913–2006); Joseph Watkin Rees (1894–1976); Alexander Augustine Parker (1908–1989); William Christopher Atkinson (1902–1992); Andreas Blinkenberg (1893–1982); Academia Cubana de la Lengua; Honoré Marie van Waeyenbergh (1891–1971); Fritz Krüger (1889–1974); James Shearer (–); Gilles-Gaston Granger (1920–2016); Lawton P. G. Peckham (1904–1979); Olaf Deutschmann (1912–1989); Leonida Biancolini (1890–1968); Emiliano Diez Echarri (–); Martín Ruipérez (1923–2015); Eric Jules François Arnould (–); E. Kohler (–); Jesús Castañon (1897–1960); Fredrik Norman (–); João Paulo do Vale de Medeiros (–); Luis Suárez Fernández (1924–2024)
30	Pablo Neruda (1904–1973)	Chile	poetry	André Joucla-Ruau (1923–1972)
31	Marcel Pagnol (1895–1974)	France	novel, memoir, drama, screenplay	Jean Ricci (1933–2011)
32	Saint-John Perse (1887–1975)	France	poetry	Marcel Raymond (1897–1981); Roger Martin du Gard (1881–1958)
33	Ezra Pound (1885–1972)	United States	poetry, essays	Erik Hjalmar Linder (1906–1994)
34	Vasco Pratolini (1913–1991)	Italy	novel, short story	Paul Renucci (1915–1976)
35	Sarvepalli Radhakrishnan (1888–1975)	India	philosophy, essays, law	Nirmal Kumar Sidhanta (1929–2014)
36	Alfonso Reyes Ochoa (1889–1959)	Mexico	philosophy, essays, novel, poetry	National Autonomous University of Mexico
37	Jean Schlumberger (1877–1968)	France	poetry, essays	Pierre Legouis (1891–1973)
38	Zalman Shneour (1887–1959)	Soviet Union (Belarus); United States	poetry, essays	Robert Henry Pfeiffer (1892–1958)
39	Mikhail Sholokhov (1905–1984)	Soviet Union	novel	Johannes Andreasson Dale (1898–1975); André Bonnard (1888–1959)
40	Stijn Streuvels (1871–1969)	Belgium	novel, short story	Pierre Brachin (1914–2004)
41	Jules Supervielle (1884–1960)	France; Uruguay	poetry, novel, short story	Maurice Le Boucher (1882–1964)
42	George Macauley Trevelyan (1876–1962)	United Kingdom	biography, autobiography, essays, history	Nils Ahnlund (1889–1957)
43	Giuseppe Ungaretti (1888–1970)	Italy	poetry, essays, literary criticism	Marcel Raymond (1897–1981)
44	Tarjei Vesaas (1897–1970)	Norway	poetry, novel	Sigmund Skard (1903–1995); Harald Beyer (1891–1960)

== Reactions ==
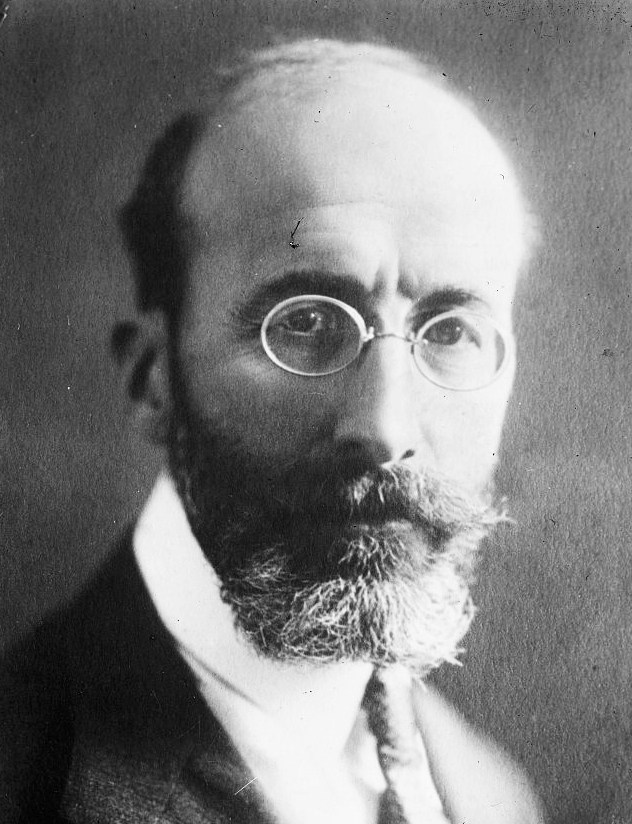
Ramón Menéndez Pidal received 95 nominations only for the year 1956, becoming the author with the highest nominations in the Academy's archives.

The strongest contender for the 1956 Nobel Prize was the Spanish historian and philologist Ramón Menéndez Pidal with 95 nominations from academics, critics, authors, literary societies and politicians. His surmounting nomination was snubbed instead by the Swedish Academy and given to the poet, Juan Ramón Jiménez, who was nominated by Harry Martinson, an academy member. The rejection of Menéndez Pidal sparked heavy criticisms from the literary world. He received 154 nominations in all since 1931 up to 1968, the year he died.

The Nobel citation for Juan Ramón Jiménez, says:

"This year's laureate is the last survivor of the famous "generation of 1898". For a generation of poets on both sides of the ocean which separates, and at the same time, unites the Hispanic countries, he has been a master – the master, in effect. When the Swedish Academy renders homage to Juan Ramón Jiménez, it renders homage also to an entire epoch in the glorious Spanish literature."

According to Burton Feldman, in his book The Nobel Prize: A History of Geniuses Controversy, and Prestige, the selection of Jiménez was made as form of recompense for the neglected past generation of writers who had set out a unique revival of Spanish writing in 1898, which includes Antonio and Manuel Machado, Ramón del Valle-Inclán, Miguel de Unamuno, the Nicaraguan Rubén Darío (then living in Spain), and Jiménez among them. Feldman said: "But making him a stand-in for a neglected generation renders his own honor ambiguous. Did he deserve the honor on his own, or because the others died ignored and he happened to live so long?"

== Award Ceremony ==
At the award ceremony in Stockholm on 10 December 1956, Hjalmar Gullberg of the Swedish Academy said:

A long life consecrated to poetry and to beauty has been honoured this year with the Nobel Prize in Literature. He is an old gardener, this Juan Ramón, who has dedicated half a century to the creation of a new rose, a white mystical rose, which will bear his name. (...) In the annals of the Nobel Prize, Spanish literature has been one of the distant gardens. Very rarely have we cast a glance inside. This year’s laureate is the last survivor of the famous “generation of 1898”. For a generation of poets on both sides of the ocean which separates, and at the same time, unites the Hispanic countries, he has been a master – the master, in effect. When the Swedish Academy renders homage to Juan Ramón Jiménez, it renders homage also to an entire epoch in the glorious Spanish literature.

== Nobel banquet ==
Jiménez was unable to be present at the award ceremony and the Nobel Banquet in Stockholm, December 10, 1956, thus his speech was read by Jaime Benítez Rexach, Rector of the University of Puerto Rico. He was unable to participate in the event because he was emotionally devastated over the death of his wife, Zenobia Camprubí, from ovarian cancer and because of his intermittent sickness caused by old age. In his sorrow, Jiménez said: "Besieged by sorrow and sickness, I must remain in Puerto Rico, unable to participate directly in the solemnities... My wife Zenobia is the true winner of this Prize. Her companionship, her help, her inspiration made, for forty years, my work possible. Today, without her, I am desolate and helpless."

Prior to the speech, Ragnar Granit, a member of the Swedish Royal Academy of Sciences, said of Juan Ramón Jiménez:

Juan Ramón has been called a poet for poets, but the layman can approach him if willing first to partake passively of the sheer visual beauty of his landscape, lovely Andalusia, its birds, its flowers, pomegranates, and oranges. Once inside his world, by leisurely reading and rereading, one gradually awakens to a new «living insight» into it, refreshed by the depth and richness of a rare poetical imagination.
