= 1946 Nobel Prize in Literature =

- Hermann Hesse
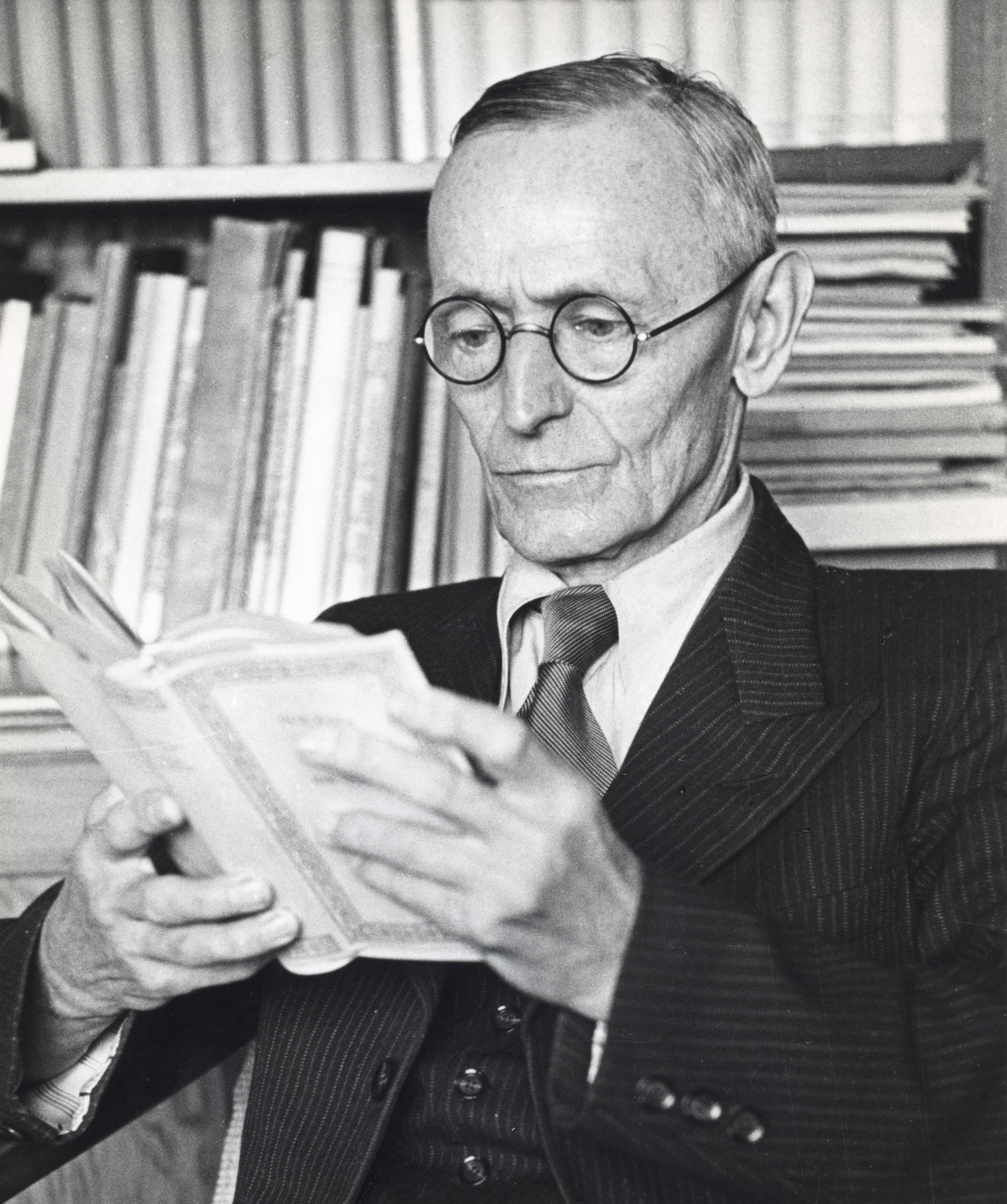
- "for his inspired writings which, while growing in boldness and penetration, exemplify the classical humanitarian ideals and high qualities of style"
- Date: 14 November 1946 (announcement); 10 December 1946 (ceremony)
- Location: Stockholm, Sweden
- Presented by: Swedish Academy
- First award: 1901
- Website: Official website

The 1946 Nobel Prize in Literature was awarded to the German author Hermann Hesse (1877–1962) "for his inspired writings which, while growing in boldness and penetration, exemplify the classical humanitarian ideals and high qualities of style".

== Laureate ==
Hermann Hesse was a novelist and a poet whose writings are influenced by the likes of Francis of Assisi, Buddha, Nietzsche and Dostoyevsky. His best known works – Demian (1919), Siddhartha (1922), Der Steppenwolf (1927), and Das Glasperlenspiel ("The Glass Bead Game", 1943) – deal with the individual's search for self-knowledge and spirituality, often through mysticism.

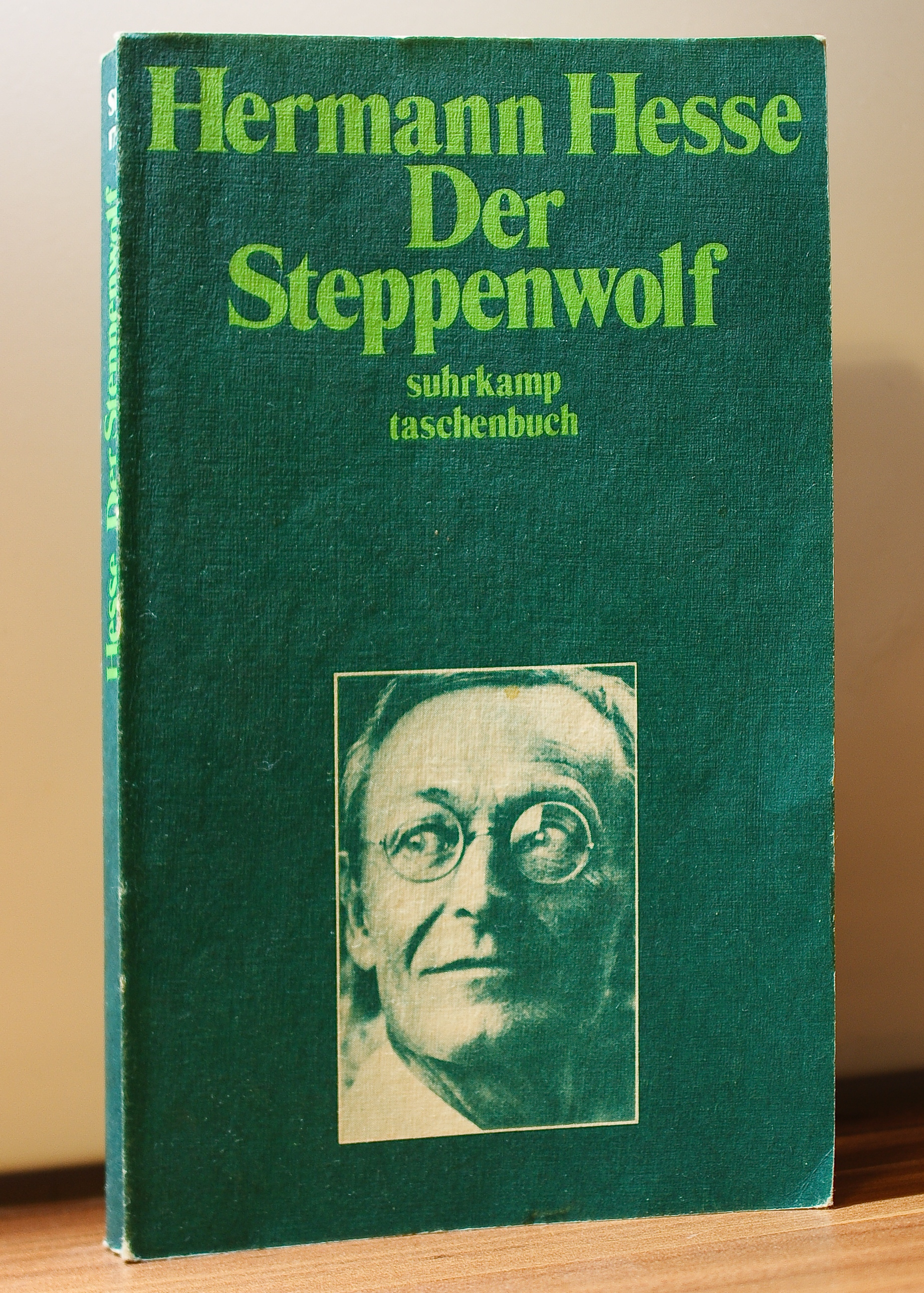
Der Steppenwolf was wildly popular and has been a perpetual success across the decades, but Hesse later asserted that the book was largely misunderstood.

== Deliberations ==
=== Nominations ===
Hermann Hesse was nominated for the prize eight times, first in 1931 by the 1929 Nobel Prize laureate Thomas Mann. In 1946 the Nobel committee received one nomination for Hesse by the Swiss literature professor and author Robert Faesi, and one nomination by Anders Österling of the Swedish Academy.

In total, the Nobel committee received 32 nominations for 22 writers including Nikolai Berdyaev, T. S. Eliot (awarded in 1948), E. M. Forster, H. G. Wells, Arnulf Øverland, Georges Duhamel, and Marie Under. Nine of the authors were first-time nominated namely André Gide (awarded in 1947), François Mauriac (awarded in 1952), Winston Churchill (awarded in 1953), Boris Pasternak (awarded in 1958), Sholem Asch, Tarjei Vesaas, Angelos Sikelianos and Ignazio Silone. The Swiss author Charles Ferdinand Ramuz was the most nominated with four nominations. Marie Under and Maria Madalena de Martel Patrício were the only women nominated.

The authors Marion Angus, Octave Aubry, Eduard Bass, John Langalibalele Dube, Ronald Fangen, Constance Garnett, Harley Granville-Barker, Amir Hamzah, Pedro Henríquez Ureña, Violet Jacob, Orrick Glenday Johns, Nikolai Alexandrovich Morozov, Ernest Rhys, Alfred Rosenberg, Damon Runyon, Thomas Scott-Ellis, Edward Sheldon, Mary Amelia St. Clair (known as May Sinclair), Gertrude Stein, Alcides Arguedas,Booth Tarkington and Ibn Zaydan died in 1946 without having been nominated for the prize.

Official list of nominees and their nominators for the prize
No.	Nominee	Country	Genre(s)	Nominator(s)
1	Sholem Asch (1880–1957)	Poland; United States	novel, short story, drama, essays	Walter Arthur Berendsohn (1884–1984)
2	Nikolai Berdyaev (1874–1948)	Soviet Union (Ukraine)	philosophy, theology	Alf Nyman (1884–1968)
3	Winston Churchill (1874–1965)	United Kingdom	history, essays, memoir	Axel Romdahl (1880–1951)
4	Maria Madalena de Martel Patrício (1884–1947)	Portugal	poetry, essays	António Baião (1878–1961)
5	Georges Duhamel (1884–1966)	France	novel, short story, poetry, drama, literary criticism	Hjalmar Hammarskjöld (1862–1953)
6	Thomas Stearns Eliot (1888–1965)	United States; United Kingdom	poetry, essays, drama	Gustaf Hellström (1882–1953); Anders Österling (1884–1981)
7	Edward Morgan Forster (1879–1970)	United Kingdom	novel, short story, drama, essays, biography, literary criticism	Gustaf Hellström (1882–1953)
8	André Gide (1869–1951)	France	novel, short story, poetry, drama, memoir, essays	Giuseppe Antonio Borgese (1882–1952)
9	Herbert J. C. Grierson (1866–1960)	United Kingdom	essays, literary criticism	William James Entwistle (1895–1952)
10	Hermann Hesse (1877–1962)	Germany; Switzerland	novel, poetry, essays, short story	Anders Österling (1884–1981); Robert Faesi (1883–1972)
11	Ricarda Huch (1864–1947)	Germany	history, essays, novel, poetry	Fritz Strich (1882–1963)
12	François Mauriac (1885–1970)	France	novel, short story	Sigfrid Siwertz (1882–1970); Henry Olsson (1896–1985)
13	Charles Langbridge Morgan (1894–1958)	United Kingdom	drama, novel, essays, poetry	Sigfrid Siwertz (1882–1970); Henning Söderhjelm (1888–1967)
14	Arvid Mörne (1876–1946)	Finland	poetry, drama, novel, essays	Rolf Pipping (1889–1963); Olaf Homén (1879–1949)
15	Arnulf Øverland (1889–1968)	Norway	poetry, essays	Andreas Hofgaard Winsnes (1889–1972); Francis Bull (1887–1974); Rolv Thesen (1896–1966)
16	Boris Pasternak (1890–1960)	Soviet Union	poetry, novel, translation	Maurice Bowra (1898–1971)
17	Charles Ferdinand Ramuz (1878–1947)	Switzerland	novel, poetry, short story	Hjalmar Hammarskjöld (1862–1953); Albert Béguin (1901–1957); Henri de Ziégler (1885–1970); Marcel Raymond (1897–1981)
18	Angelos Sikelianos (1884–1951)	Greece	poetry, drama	Anders Österling (1884–1981)
19	Ignazio Silone (1900–1978)	Italy	novel, short story, essays, drama	Hjalmar Gullberg (1898–1961)
20	Marie Under (1883–1980)	Soviet Union (Estonia)	poetry	Hjalmar Hammarskjöld (1862–1953)
21	Tarjei Vesaas (1897–1970)	Norway	poetry, novel	Olav Midttun (1883–1972)
22	Herbert George Wells (1866–1946)	United Kingdom	novel, short story, essays, history, biography	Carl Adolf Bodelsen (1894–1978)

== Prize decision ==
In the Nobel committee's report to the Swedish Academy dated 13 September 1946, committee chairman Per Hallström wrote of Hermann Hesse's candidacy that the committee has "remained with the opinion expressed several times before, that this author's prose works really only reached real stylistic mastery during one of his periods of development, which, however, is not matched by the value of the content. His creations in verse do not give rise to such reservations; he is undoubtedly a very outstanding lyricist, in my opinion, however, not of sufficient magnitude to justify a Nobel Prize." Three other members of the committee Anders Österling, Fredrik Böök and Sigfrid Siwertz, however supported a prize to Hesse. In a separate report, Österling advocated a prize to Hesse, noting that "His storytelling is bold, penetrating and imaginative, even if it is not at the same height in all his works (...) As a lyricist he combines exquisite purity of tone with gripping warmth of feeling, and his noble musical form is unsurpassed in his time."

For the 1946 prize, the French novelist Georges Duhamel were also considered with the committee unanimously stating that he was worthy of the prize, committee member Hjalmar Hammarskjöld however noted that he would place the candidacy of the Swiss writer Charles Ferdinand Ramuz ahead of Duhamel's. Committee member Sigfrid Siewertz proposed François Mauriac, subsequently awarded the 1952 Nobel Prize in Literature, which received some support in the committee. The candidacy of André Gide, subsequently awarded the 1947 Nobel Prize in Literature, was dismissed, as were T. S. Eliot, awarded in 1948,: "With all due respect for Eliot's high and strict idealism, the statement could not, however, advocate the awarding of a Nobel Prize, with its universal purpose, to such a self-isolated and elusive poet.", committee chairman Per Hallström wrote.

On 14 November 1946, the Swedish Academy decided that that year's Nobel Prize in Literature should be awarded to Hermann Hesse "for his inspired writings which, while growing in boldness and penetration, exemplify the classical humanitarian ideals and high qualities of style".

== Award ceremony ==
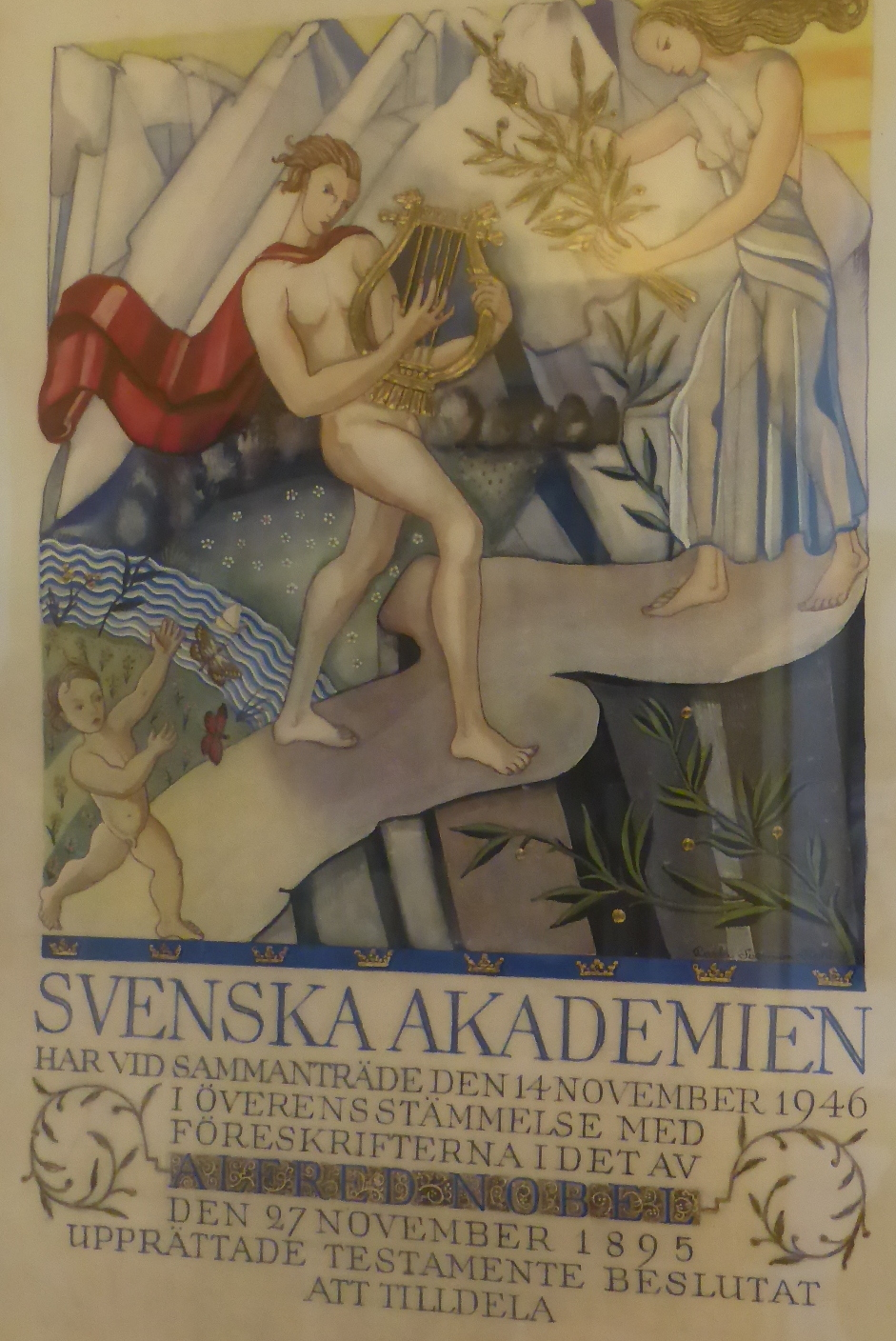
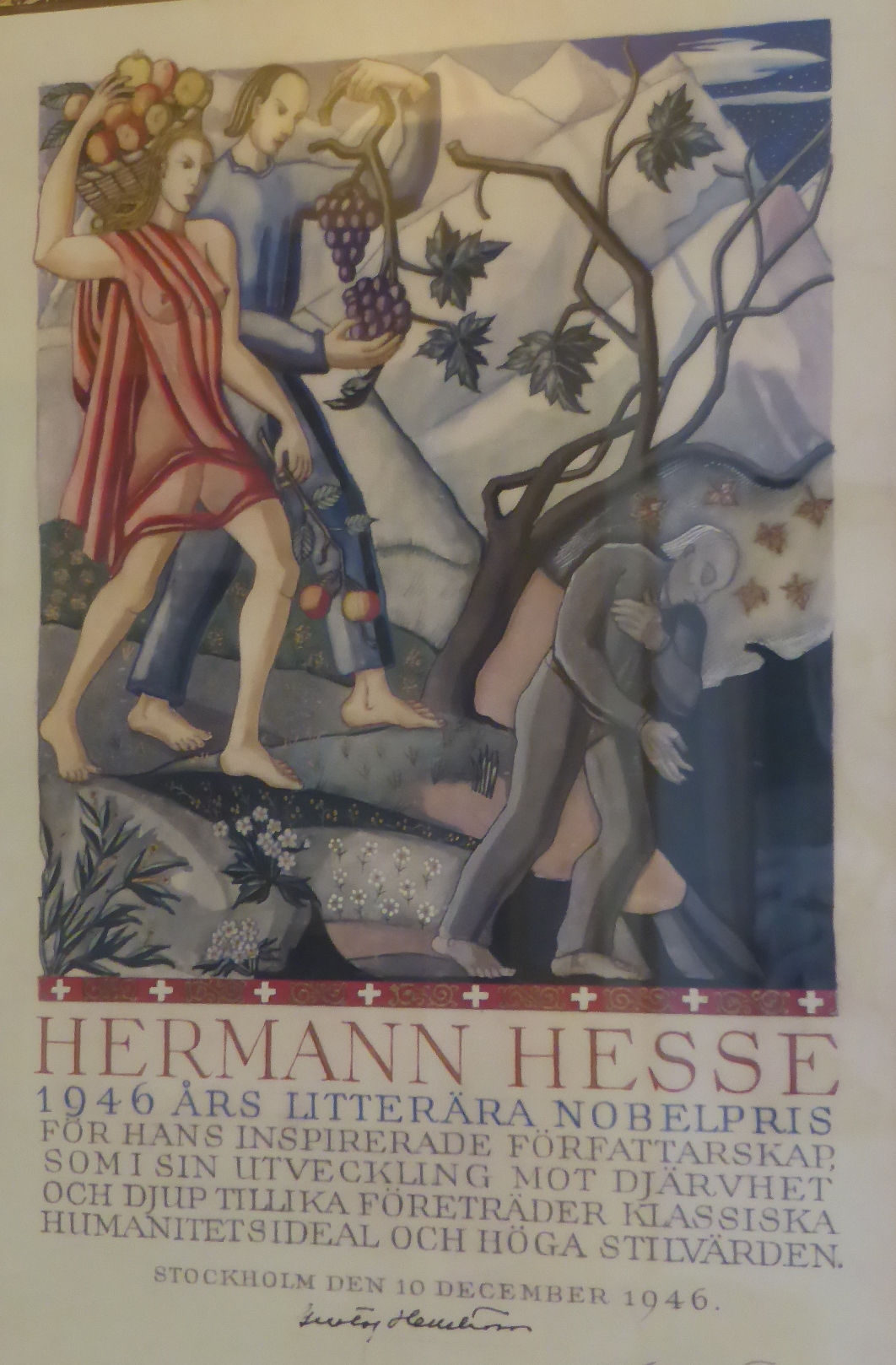
The Nobel diploma awarded to Herman Hesse.

At the award ceremony in Stockholm on 10 December 1946, Anders Österling, permanent secretary of the Swedish Academy, said:

This year’s Nobel Prize in literature has been awarded to a writer of German origin who has had wide critical acclaim and who has created his work regardless of public favour. The sixty-nine-year-old Hermann Hesse can look back on a considerable achievement consisting of novels, short stories, and poems, partly available in Swedish translation. (...) at present Hesse, together with Mann, is the best representative of the German cultural heritage in contemporary literature. (...)

Hesse’s award is more than the confirmation of his fame. It honours a poetic achievement which presents throughout the image of a good man in his struggle, following his calling with rare faithfulness, who in a tragic epoch succeeded in bearing the arms of true humanism.

Reasons of health prevented Hermann Hesse to travel to Stockholm for the award ceremony. In his stead, the prize was accepted by the envoy of the Swiss republic.
