= 1945 Nobel Prize in Literature =

- Gabriela Mistral
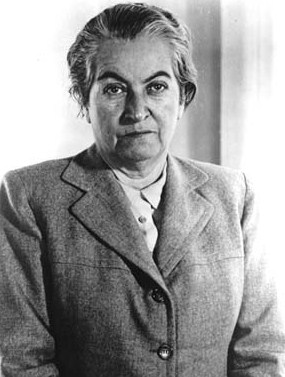
- "for her lyric poetry, which inspired by powerful emotions, has made her name a symbol of the idealistic aspirations of the entire Latin American world"
- Date: 15 November 1945 (announcement); 10 December 1945 (ceremony)
- Location: Stockholm, Sweden
- Presented by: Swedish Academy
- First award: 1901
- Website: Official website

The 1945 Nobel Prize in Literature was awarded to the Chilean poet Gabriela Mistral (1889–1957) "for her lyric poetry, which inspired by powerful emotions, has made her name a symbol of the idealistic aspirations of the entire Latin American world." She is the fifth female and first Latin American recipient of the literature prize.

== Laureate ==
Lucila Godoy Alcayaga borrowed the pseudonym, Gabriela Mistral, from her favorite poets, Gabriele D'Annunzio and Frédéric Mistral. Her poetry is distinguished by intense emotion and straightforward language, having been influenced also by the modernist movement. Affection, deceit, sorrow, nature, travel, and love for children are some of their major themes. Mistral's first prominent poetry collection was Desolación ("Despair"), published in 1922. Ternura ("Tenderness"), published in 1924, contains nursery rhymes and lullabies for children whereas Tala ("Harvesting", 1938) makes use of strange imagery and free verse. She was well-known for writing op-eds for major Chilean newspapers such as El Coquimbo: Diario Radical and La Voz de Elqui. In her country, she became the first female to be awarded the National Prize for Literature.

== Deliberations ==
=== Nominations ===
Mistral received eight nominations beginning in 1940. For 1945, she was nominated by the newly inducted Swedish Academy member Elin Wägner (1882–1949) by which she was eventually awarded. In total, the Nobel Committee received 27 nominations for 22 writers. Five of the nominees were nominated first-time: Thomas Stearns Eliot (awarded in 1948), Yiorgos Theotokas, Edward Morgan Forster, and Marie Under. There were five female nominees namely Elisaveta Bagryana, Maria Madalena de Martel Patrício, Gabriela Mistral, Henriette Charasson and Marie Under. The nominations of the Armando Alvares Pedroso, Henriette Charasson, Teixeira de Pascoaes and Enrique Larreta were declared invalid by the Nobel Committee.

The French poet Paul Valéry was nominated for the tenth, eleventh and twelfth time by three members of the Swedish Academy. It is believed that the Academy intended to award Valéry the prize in 1945, but he died in July.

The authors Maurice Baring, Ursula Bethell, Robert Brasillach, Dietrich Bonhoeffer, Ernst Cassirer, Mário de Andrade, Margaret Deland, Lucie Delarue-Mardrus, Robert Desnos, Jelena Dimitrijević, Pierre Drieu La Rochelle, Maurice Donnay, Alfred Douglas, E. R. Eddison, Ioan Constantin Filitti, Zinaida Gippius, Ellen Glasgow, Josef Hora, Else Lasker-Schüler, Régis Messac, Arthur Morrison, Otto Neurath, Kitaro Nishida, Charles Gilman Norris, Maria Pawlikowska-Jasnorzewska, Alexander Roda Roda, Felix Salten, Lurana W. Sheldon, Antal Szerb, Aleksey Nikolayevich Tolstoy, Charles Williams, Emmanuel Bove died in 1945 without having been nominated for the prize. The Dutch historian Johan Huizinga and Austrian-Bohemian author Franz Werfel died months before the announcement.

Official list of nominees and their nominators for the prize
No.	Nominee	Country	Genre(s)	Nominator(s)
1	Armando Alvares Pedroso (1907–1990)	Cuba	biography, essays	unnamed (Note: Nomination was declared invalid by the Nobel Committee)
2	Elisaveta Bagryana (1893–1991)	Bulgaria	poetry, translation	Stefan Mladenov (1880–1963) (Note: Nomination was originally sent in 1943, but was moved to the nomination list for 1945.)
3	Nikolai Berdyaev (1874–1948)	Soviet Union (Ukraine)	philosophy, theology	Alf Nyman (1884–1968)
4	Edmund Blunden (1896–1974)	United Kingdom	poetry, essays, biography	Heinrich Wolfgang Donner (1904-1980)
5	Henriette Charasson (1884–1972)	France	poetry, essays, drama, novel, literary criticism, biography	unnamed
6	Maria Madalena de Martel Patrício (1884–1947)	Portugal	poetry, essays	António Baião (1878–1961)
7	Teixeira de Pascoaes (1877–1952)	Portugal	poetry	unnamed
8	Georges Duhamel (1884–1966)	France	novel, short story, poetry, drama, literary criticism	Hjalmar Hammarskjöld (1862–1953)
9	Thomas Stearns Eliot (1888–1965)	United States; United Kingdom	poetry, essays, drama	Anders Österling (1884–1981)
10	Johan Falkberget (1879–1967)	Norway	novel, short story, essays	Eugenia Kielland (1878–1969)
11	Edward Morgan Forster (1879–1970)	United Kingdom	novel, short story, drama, essays, biography, literary criticism	Greta Hedin (1889–1949)
12	Johan Huizinga (1872–1945)	Netherlands	history	Willem van Eysinga (1878–1961); Hjalmar Hammarskjöld (1862–1953)
13	Enrique Larreta (1875–1961)	Argentina	history, essays, drama, novel	unnamed
14	Gabriela Mistral (1889–1957)	Chile	poetry	Elin Wägner (1882–1949)
15	Arvid Mörne (1876–1946)	Finland	poetry, drama, novel, essays	Gustav Suits (1883–1956)
16	Charles Ferdinand Ramuz (1878–1947)	Switzerland	novel, poetry, short story	Marcel Raymond (1897–1981) (Note: Ramuz was nominated by M. Raymond and a number of professors of French, German and Italian literature at Swiss universities.)
17	Jules Romains (1885–1972)	France	poetry, drama, screenplay	Holger Sten (1907–1971)
18	John Steinbeck (1902–1968)	United States	novel, short story, screenplay	Gustaf Munthe (1896–1962)
19	Yiorgos Theotokas (1906–1966)	Greece	novel, short story, drama, essays	Sigfrid Siwertz (1882–1970)
20	Marie Under (1883–1980)	Soviet Union (Estonia)	poetry	Ants Oras (1900–1982)
21	Paul Valéry (1871–1945)	France	poetry, philosophy, essays, drama	Anders Österling (1884–1981); Sigfrid Siwertz (1882–1970); Fredrik Böök (1883–1961)
22	Franz Werfel (1890–1945)	Czechoslovakia	novel, short story, drama, poetry	Ragnar Josephson (1891–1966); John Landquist (1881–1974); Walter Arthur Berendsohn (1884–1984)

== Prize decision ==
Gabriela Mistral had been proposed several times by the Nobel committee of the Swedish Academy since 1940 before she was awarded in 1945. The Swedish poet and Academy member Hjalmar Gullberg's acclaimed translations of Mistral's poetry is believed to have been a crucial factor for the Academy to award Mistral the prize.

Three committee members, Fredrik Böök, Anders Österling and Sigfrid Siwertz, initially advocated that the 1945 Nobel Prize in Literature should be awarded to the French poet and essayist Paul Valéry. But after Valéry had died during the deliberations that year, Österling and Siwertz dropped their support for the proposal arguing that the Nobel prize should not be awarded posthumously, an opinion that was supported by committee member Hjalmar Hammarskjöld. Böök stuck with the proposal to award Valéry, arguing that there were no obstacle for awarding the prize posthumously, as had happened in 1931. After initial misgivings that Valéry's work was too esoteric, committee chairman Per Hallström joined Böök's proposal to award Valéry.

After Valéry had died, Österling and Siwertz supported Hammarskjöld's proposal to award Gabriela Mistral, thus giving Mistral's candidacy the majority of support in the Nobel committee.

The committee also considered the French author Jules Romains as a contender for the prize, but decided to await further volumes of his novel cycle Les Hommes de bonne volonté. The candidacy of T. S. Eliot (subsequently awarded the 1948 Nobel Prize in Literature) was rejected by committee chairman Per Hallström: "The extremely exclusive nature of the poetry in question makes it hardly suitable for an award with the Nobel Prize in Literature, which has to answer to a fairly universal forum".

On 15 November 1945, the Swedish Academy decided that that year's Nobel Prize in Literature should be awarded to Gabriela Mistral "for her lyric poetry, which inspired by powerful emotions, has made her name a symbol of the idealistic aspirations of the entire Latin American world."
