= 1948 Nobel Prize in Literature =

- Thomas Stearns Eliot
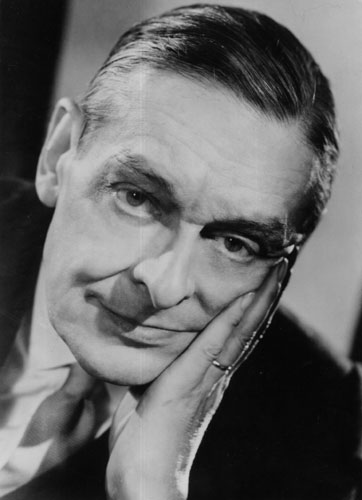
- "for his outstanding, pioneer contribution to present-day poetry."
- Date: 4 November 1948 (announcement); 10 December 1948 (ceremony)
- Location: Stockholm, Sweden
- Presented by: Swedish Academy
- First award: 1901
- Website: Official website

The 1948 Nobel Prize in Literature was awarded to British-American poet Thomas Stearns Eliot (pen name, T. S. Eliot) (1888–1965) "for his outstanding, pioneer contribution to present-day poetry." Eliot is the fourth British (born in the United States) recipient of the prize after John Galsworthy in 1932.

== Laureate ==
T.S. Eliot was a highly influential poet known for works such as The Waste Land (1922) and Four Quartets (1940). His belief that poetry should aim to represent the complexities of modern civilization made him one of the most daring innovators of 20th century poetry. He also wrote essays and plays such as Murder in the Cathedral (1935).

== Deliberations ==
=== Nominations ===
T.S. Eliot was nominated for the Nobel Prize in Literature on seven occasions, the first time in 1945. In 1948, three nominations for Eliot were submitted which eventually led to him being awarded the prize.

In total, the Nobel committee received 45 nominations for 32 writers including André Malraux, Georges Duhamel, Winston Churchill (awarded in 1953), Toyohiko Kagawa, Boris Pasternak (awarded in 1958), Nikolai Berdyaev, Mikhail Sholokov (awarded in 1965), Shmuel Yosef Agnon (awarded in 1966), Angelos Sikelianos, Mark Aldanov, and Arnulf Øverland. Seven of the nominees were nominated first-time among them George Santayana, Zalman Shneur, George Macauley Trevelyan, Halldór Laxness (awarded in 1955), and Riccardo Bacchelli. Three of the nominees were women: Marie Under, Sidonie-Gabrielle Colette and Dorothy Canfield Fisher.

The 1929 Nobel Prize laureate Thomas Mann was unconventionally nominated for a second prize by two members of the Swedish Academy. The authors Antonin Artaud, Charles A. Beard, Georges Bernanos, Alice Brown, Wilbur Lucius Cross, Osamu Dazai, André Fontainas, Susan Glaspell, Frederick Philip Grove, Victor Ido, Klara Johanson, Aldo Leopold, Monteiro Lobato, Emil Ludwig, Claude McKay, Thomas Mofolo, Na Hye-sok, Sextil Pușcariu, Antonin Sertillanges, Montague Summers, and Marcelle Tinayre died in 1948 without having been nominated for the prize. Russian philosopher Nikolai Berdyaev died months before the announcement.

Official list of nominees and their nominators for the prize
No.	Nominee	Country	Genre(s)	Nominator(s)
1	Mark Aldanov (1886–1957)	Soviet Union (Ukraine); France	biography, novel, essays, literary criticism	Ivan Bunin (1870–1953)
2	Shmuel Yosef Agnon (1887–1970)	Israel	novel, short story	Martin Lamm (1880–1950)
3	Eugène Baie (1874–1964)	Belgium	law, essays	Maurice Maeterlinck (1862–1949); Académie Royale de Belgique
4	Riccardo Bacchelli (1891–1985)	Italy	novel, drama, essays	Accademia dei Lincei
5	Nikolai Berdyaev (1874–1948)	Soviet Union (Ukraine)	philosophy, theology	Alf Nyman (1884–1968)
6	René Béhaine (1880–1966)	France	novel, short story, essays	Maurice Mignon (1882–1962)
7	Dorothy Canfield Fisher (1879–1958)	United States	novel, short story, pedagogy, essays	David Baumgardt (1890–1963) (Note: Dorothy Fisher was also nominated by other, undisclosed nominators.)
8	Winston Churchill (1874–1965)	United Kingdom	history, essays, memoir	Birger Nerman (1888–1971); Oscar Wieselgren (1886–1971); Einar Löfstedt (1880–1955); Birger Ekeberg (1880–1968); Nils Ahnlund (1889–1957); Harald Hagendahl (1889–1986)
9	Sidonie-Gabrielle Colette (1873–1954)	France	novel, short story	Claude Farrère (1876–1957)
10	Benedetto Croce (1866–1952)	Italy	history, philosophy, law	Accademia dei Lincei
11	Teixeira de Pascoaes (1877–1952)	Portugal	poetry	João António Mascarenhas Júdice (1898–1957)
12	Georgios Drossinis (1859–1951)	Greece	poetry, novel, short story	Geōrgios Oikonomos (1882–1951)
13	Georges Duhamel (1884–1966)	France	novel, short story, poetry, drama, literary criticism	Georges Lecomte (1867–1958); Jean-Marie Carré (1887–1958)
14	Thomas Stearns Eliot (1888–1965)	United States; United Kingdom	poetry, essays, drama	Justin O'Brien (1906–1968); Oscar Wieselgren (1886–1971); Donald Alfred Stauffer (1902–1952)
15	Johan Falkberget (1879–1967)	Norway	novel, short story, essays	Andreas Hofgaard Winsnes (1889–1972); Sigrid Undset (1882–1949)
16	Franz Hellens (1881–1972)	Belgium	novel, poetry, literary criticism	Anders Österling (1884–1981)
17	Toyohiko Kagawa (1888–1960)	Japan	essays	Sven Hedin (1865–1952)
18	Rudolf Kassner (1873–1959)	Austria	philosophy, essays, translation	Theophil Spoerri (1890–1974)
19	Halldór Laxness (1902–1998)	Iceland	novel, short story, drama, poetry	Jón Helgason (1899–1986); Einar Sveinsson (1906–1973); Sigurður Nordal (1886–1974)
20	André Malraux (1901–1976)	France	novel, essays, literary criticism	Justin O'Brien (1906–1968)
21	Thomas Mann (1875–1955)	Germany	novel, short story, essays	Einar Löfstedt (1880–1955); Hjalmar Gullberg (1898–1961)
22	Ramón Menéndez Pidal (1869–1968)	Spain	philology, history	Gunnar Tilander (1894–1973)
23	Charles Langbridge Morgan (1894–1958)	United Kingdom	drama, novel, essays, poetry	Otto Funke
24	Arnulf Øverland (1889–1968)	Norway	poetry, essays	Sigurd Erixon (1888–1968); Andreas Hofgaard Winsnes (1889–1972)
25	Boris Pasternak (1890–1960)	Soviet Union	poetry, novel, translation	Martin Lamm (1880–1950)
26	Jules Romains (1885–1972)	France	poetry, drama, screenplay	Alfred Jolivet (1885–1966)
27	George Santayana (1863–1952)	Spain; United States	philosophy, essays, poetry, novel	Justin O'Brien (1906–1968)
28	Zalman Shneour (1887–1959)	Soviet Union (Belarus); United States	poetry, essays	Joseph Klausner (1874–1958)
29	Mikhail Sholokhov (1905–1984)	Soviet Union	novel	Nobel Committee (unspecified)
30	Angelos Sikelianos (1884–1951)	Greece	poetry, drama	Axel Waldemar Persson (1888–1951); Elin Wägner (1882–1949)
31	George Macauley Trevelyan (1876–1962)	United Kingdom	biography, autobiography, essays, history	Nils Ahnlund (1889–1957)
32	Marie Under (1883–1980)	Soviet Union (Estonia)	poetry	Hjalmar Hammarskjöld (1862–1953)

== Prize decision ==
For the 1948 Nobel Prize in Literature, the Nobel committee shortlisted T. S. Eliot, Greek poet Angelos Sikelianos and the British playwright and novelist Charles Langbridge Morgan. A majority of the committee advocated a prize to Eliot, while committee member Sigfrid Siwertz placed Sikelianos as his first proposal. As Eliot and Sikelianos were both considered worthy of the prize, the possibility of a shared prize between the two was considered but rejected by the committee, with chairman Anders Österling referring to it "as where both are considered, it would certainly be considered a disparagement".

Österling said of Eliot's works: "However the assessment may vary, it is impossible to deny that in his era he has played the role of an eminent questioner with a master's art of formulation both in poetic imagery and in the timely answers of the essays. His most talked-about work, The Waste Land, is now 26 years old, a risky age when it comes to literary experiments. But it has been proven that this bitterly ingenious composition on the theme of the drought and impotence of modern civilization has an absolutely undiminished topicality after the Second World War and cuts through the phenomena of the time with its sharp edge, that of catastrophic vision."

Of the two main candidates, Österling argued that Eliot should have precedence to the award: "Since a prize for Sikelianos this year would probably be perceived as a bypassing of the figure that is obviously more interesting to world opinion in favor of a less famous poet in a difficult-to-access language field, and since according to information from a reliable source, a prize for Sikelianos would not be greeted with general approval in his violently divided homeland at the moment, I find it ultimately wisest from the Academy's point of view to leave the lead to Eliot without in any way pushing the Greek candidacy aside."

Committee member Hjalmar Gullberg also placed Eliot ahead of Sikeleanos, saying of the latter: "By the very isolation and limitation of his native language, this modern heir of Pindar and Hesiod is prevented from exerting any influence on world literature; his strength lies in the surging tide of words more than in originality, in the obscure primordiality of inspiration more than in the sharpness of thought."

In advocating that Sikeleanos should have precedence, Sigfrid Siwertz said of his poetry: "it seems to me that even in the lyrical translations a peculiar sublimity and beauty shines through. A mixed light, a double exposure of classical and modern, gives a deep time perspective and a sculptural relief", and argued that "It seems to me that the Academy should not disadvantage poets belonging to smaller linguistic and cultural circles. It can hardly be in the spirit of Nobel to only register the great world successes (...) The Academy may thereby secure its own position, but what does it do for literature?"

On 4 November 1948, the Swedish Academy decided that that year's Nobel Prize in Literature should be awarded to T. S. Eliot "for his outstanding, pioneer contribution to present-day poetry".

== Award ceremony speech ==
At the award ceremony in Stockholm on 10 December 1948, Anders Österling, permanent secretary of the Swedish Academy, said of Eliot:

His career is remarkable in that, from an extremely exclusive and consciously isolated position, he has gradually come to exercise a very far-reaching influence. At the outset he appeared to address himself to but a small circle of initiates, but this circle slowly widened, without his appearing to will it himself. Thus in Eliot's verse and prose there was quite a special accent, which compelled attention just in our own time, a capacity to cut into the consciousness of our generation with the sharpness of a diamond.
