= 1919 Nobel Prize in Literature =

Award

- Carl Spitteler
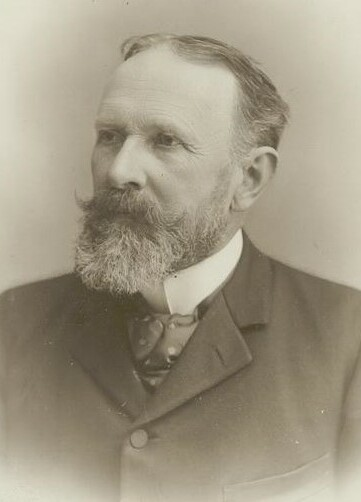
- "in special appreciation of his epic, Olympian Spring."
- Date: 13 November 1919 (Note: The Swedish Academy decided on 13th November 1919 that the 1918 Nobel Prize in Literature would not be awarded and that the current year's Nobel Prize in Literature would be reserved for the following year.) (postponement); 11 November 1920 (announcement); 10 December 1920 (ceremony)
- Location: Stockholm, Sweden
- Presented by: Swedish Academy
- First award: 1901
- Website: Official website

The 1919 Nobel Prize in Literature was awarded to the Swiss poet Carl Spitteler (1845–1924) "in special appreciation of his epic, Olympian Spring." Spitteler received his prize the following year after the Nobel Committee decided that none of the 1919 nominations met the criteria as outlined in Alfred Nobel's will. He is the first Swiss recipient of the literature prize.

== Laureate ==
Under the pseudonym of Carl Felix Tandem, Spitteler published his first poetry collection, Prometheus und Epimetheus ("Prometheus und Epithemus") in 1881, showing contrasts between ideals and dogmas through the two mythological figures of the titles. From 1900 to 1905, he wrote the epic Der olympische Frühling ("Olympian Spring"), an allegory written in iambic hexameter, mixing fantastic, naturalistic, religious and mythological themes that deal with human relationship with the universe. The novel Imago (1906) which examines the role of the unconscious in the conflict between a creative mind and the middle-class restrictions with internal monologue, influenced Carl Jung in his usage of "imago" in Jungian psychoanalysis.

=== Olympian Spring ===
Spitteler's epic Der olympische Frühling ("Olympian Spring"), written between 1900 and 1905, is about the establishment of the rule of the Greek gods over the world. An iambic hexameter allegory, the epic explores universal concerns such as faith, morality, hope, despair, and ethics in a setting among the Greek gods, at the same time, examining themes related to fantasy, religion, and mythology. It is originally published in four volumes: "Overture," "Hera the Bride," "High Tide," and "End and Change." He later revised the epic in 1909 after which it achieved immediate popularity in Switzerland and Germany, gaining thousands of publications.

== Deliberations ==
=== Nominations ===
Spitteler was first nominated in 1912 by professors in Bern and Zurich after gaining steady success in revising Olympian Spring in 1910. Since then, he received annual recommendations from various academics and Nobel Committee members – eighteen nominations in total – until he was eventually awarded in 1920.

In total, the Nobel Committee for Literature received 18 nominations for 12 authors such as Juhani Aho, Hans E. Kinck, Erik Axel Karlfeldt (awarded in 1931) and Per Hallström. Five of the nominees were newly nominated: Władysław Reymont (awarded in 1924), John Galsworthy (awarded in 1932), Ebenezer Howard, Hugo von Hofmannsthal and Arno Holz. No women were nominated for this year.

The authors Leonid Andreyev, L. Frank Baum, Matilda Betham-Edwards, Andrew Carnegie, Petre P. Carp, Ada Langworthy Collier, Ferdinando Fontana, John Fox Jr., Weedon Grossmith, Ernst Haeckel, Gustav Landauer, Paul Lindau, Rosa Luxemburg, Mary Ann Maitland, Alice Moore McComas, Barbu Nemțeanu, Jane Lippitt Patterson, Anne Isabella Thackeray Ritchie, Kolachalam Srinivasa Rao, Abraham Valdelomar, Guido von List, Ella Wheeler Wilcox, Kazimierz Zalewski died in 1919 without having been nominated for the prize.

Official list of nominees and their nominators for the prize
No.	Nominee	Country	Genre(s)	Nominator(s)
1	Juhani Aho (1861–1921)	Finland	novel, short story	Eemil Nestor Setälä (1864–1935); Verner von Heidenstam (1859–1940)
2	John Galsworthy (1867–1933)	Great Britain	novel, drama, essays, short story, memoir	Erik Axel Karlfeldt (1864–1931)
3	Ángel Guimerá Jorge (1845–1924)	Spain	drama, poetry	unnamed nominator
4	Per Hallström (1866–1960)	Sweden	short story, drama, poetry	Nathan Söderblom (1866–1931)
5	Arno Holz (1863–1929)	Germany	poetry, drama, essays	40 German authors
6	Ebenezer Howard (1850–1928)	Great Britain	essays	Christen Collin (1857–1926)
7	Alois Jirásek (1851–1930)	Czechoslovakia	novel, drama	Czech Academy of Sciences
8	Erik Axel Karlfeldt (1864–1931)	Sweden	poetry	Frits Läffler (1847–1921); Gottfrid Billing (1841–1925); Carl Bildt (1850–1931)
9	Hans Ernst Kinck (1865–1926)	Norway	philology, novel, short story, drama, essays	Gerhard Gran (1856–1925); Jens Thiis (1870–1942); Harry Fett (1875–1962); Anton Wilhelm Brøgger (1884–1951)
10	Władysław Reymont (1867–1925)	Poland	novel, short story	Polish Academy of Arts and Sciences
11	Carl Spitteler (1845–1924)	Switzerland	poetry, essays	Verner von Heidenstam (1859–1940)
12	Hugo von Hofmannsthal (1874–1929)	Austria	novel, poetry, drama, essays	Gerhart Hauptmann (1862–1946)

=== Prize decision ===
The members of the Swedish Academy wished that the 1919 Nobel Prize in Literature should be awarded to the Swedish poet and Swedish Academy member Erik Axel Karlfeldt. But Karlfeldt promptly declined the prize, explaining that he could not accept it because of his position as the permanent secretary of the Swedish Academy. Although the Academy wanted to award him, Karlfeldts reasons for not accepting the prize he was offered was met with admiration from his colleagues in the Academy. Shortly after his death, Karlfeldt was posthumously awarded the 1931 Nobel Prize in Literature.

In 1919, the Nobel committee had only 11 other nominated candidates to consider, including the subsequently awarded authors Carl Spitteler, Wladyslaw Reymont and John Galsworthy, but found none of them fully recommendable for the prize and thus proposed that the Nobel Prize in Literature should not be awarded that year.

On 13 November 1919, the Swedish Academy decided that the postponed prize for 1918 should not be awarded and that the prize for 1919 should be reserved to the following year. In 1920, the Nobel Prize for 1919 was awarded to the Swiss poet Carl Spitteler.

== Reactions ==
The choice of Carl Spitteler was seen as a surprise. "The Swedish Academy has awarded the Nobel Prize for literature in 1919 to the Swiss poet Carl Spitteler, of Lucerne, and for 1920 to the Norwegian writer Knut Hamsun. The latter choice has been fully expected and is generally approved. But much astonishment is felt as to the former", the London newspaper The Times reported in an article after the prize announcements in 1920. The English novelist and poet Thomas Hardy had been expected to win the prize, and two Swedish newspapers were quoted criticizing the Swedish Academy for ignoring Hardy.
