= Ahnlund =

Ahnlund is a surname. Notable people with the surname include:

- Knut Ahnlund (1923–2012), Swedish literary historian and writer
- Nils Ahnlund (1889–1957), Swedish historian
