= 1931 Nobel Prize in Literature =

- Erik Axel Karlfeldt
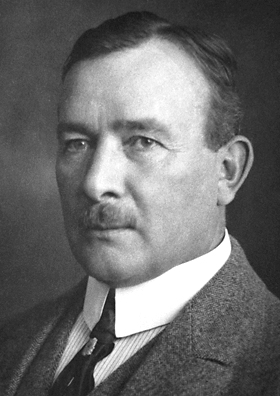
- "The poetry of Erik Axel Karlfeldt."
- Date: 8 November 1931 (announcement); 10 December 1931 (ceremony)
- Location: Stockholm, Sweden
- Presented by: Swedish Academy
- First award: 1901
- Website: Official website

The 1931 Nobel Prize in Literature was awarded posthumously to the Swedish poet Erik Axel Karlfeldt (1864–1931) with the citation: "The poetry of Erik Axel Karlfeldt." He was the third Swede to win the prize and remains the only recipient to be posthumously awarded. Karlfeldt had been offered the award already in 1919 but refused to accept it, because of his position as permanent secretary to the Swedish Academy (1913–1931), which awards the prize.

== Laureate ==
Karlfeldt's poetry is strongly influenced by the customs and environment of his childhood. But the area started to mirror the universal by becoming more and more of a microcosm. His art is primarily wild in character, marked by austerity and an antipathy to egotism. His alter ego, Fridolin, frequently appears in his poetry to convey his humor, sadness, longings, and mood. His poetry exhibits a superb command of words. Karlfeldt explored the potential offered by his imagination and poetry as an artistic medium, even though he had a strong bond with his home country and its customs.

== Deliberations ==
=== Nominations ===
Karlfeldt was nominated in 10 different occasions starting in 1916. In 1931, he received a single nomination from the 1930 Nobel Peace Prize laureate Nathan Söderblom, also a member of the Swedish Academy, with which he was awarded posthumously afterwards.

In total, the Nobel committee received 49 nominations for 29 writers. Ten of the nominees are nominated first-time among them Hermann Hesse (awarded in 1946), Francis Jammes, Ole Edvart Rølvaag, Erich Maria Remarque, Ramón Pérez de Ayala, and Ramón Menéndez Pidal. The highest number of nominations were for the Spanish philologist Ramón Menéndez Pidal with 8 nominations followed by Concha Espina de la Serna with 6 nominations. Three of the nominees were women namely Concha Espina de la Serna, Laura Mestre Hevia, and Ivana Brlić-Mažuranić.

The authors Arnold Bennett, Hjalmar Bergman, Rachel Bluwstein, Hall Caine, Enrico Corradini, Ernst Didring, Khalil Gibran, Frank Harris, Mary St. Leger Kingsley (known as Lucas Malet), Vachel Lindsay, George Herbert Mead, John Gambril Nicholson, Arthur Schnitzler, Hara Prasad Shastri, John Lawson Stoddard, Milan Šufflay, Ida B. Wells, Xu Zhimo, and Ieronim Yasinsky died in 1931 without having been nominated for the prize. Norwegian-American author Ole Edvart Rølvaag died weeks before the announcement.

Official list of nominees and their nominators for the prize
No.	Nominee	Country	Genre(s)	Nominator(s)
1	Georg Bonne (1859–1945)	Germany	essays	Carl Heldmann (1869–1943) (Note: Georg Bonne was nominated by a number of other professors, of which at least 4 were eligible to make a nomination for the Prize.)
2	Ivana Brlić-Mažuranić (1874–1938)	Yugoslavia (Croatia)	novel, short story	Gavro Manojlović (1856–1939)
3	Olaf Bull (1883–1933)	Norway	poetry	Jens Thiis (1870–1942)
4	Ivan Bunin (1870–1953)	Soviet Union	short story, novel, poetry	Sigurd Agrell (1881–1937) (Note: Sigurd Agrell proposes that the Prize be shared by both Ivan Bunin and Dmitry Merezhkovsky); Nikolaj Kullmann (?) (Note: Kullmann's nomination (he appeared to be eligible to make a nomination), along with that of three other Russians living in Paris, France, was forwarded by cabinet minister Emanuel Nobel.); Bernard Pares (1867–1949); Alexander Kaun (1889–1944); Vladimir Andreevich Frantsev (1867–1942); Olaf Broch (1867–1961)
5	Olav Duun (1876–1939)	Norway	novel, short story	Helga Eng (1875–1966)
6	Paul Ernst (1866–1933)	Germany	novel, short story, drama, essays	6 professors of the University of Zurich (Note: Paul Ernst was nominated by 6 professors of the University in Zurich who signed the previous year's nomination, as well as a further 14 professors from Germany, Bohemia and Switzerland, at least four of whom were eligible to nominate a candidate.); 14 professors from Germany, Bohemia and Switzerland
7	Concha Espina de la Serna (1869–1955)	Spain	novel, short story	Fredrik Wulff (1845–1930); 49 members of The Nobel Prize Committee of the Society of Authors (Note: Eligible professors and Academy members from Bordeaux, La Paz (Bolivia), Lima, Madrid, Salamanca, Valencia and Zaragoza nominated Concha Espina.); Jacinto Benavente (1866–1954); Alfred Baudrillart (1859–1942); Hugo Obermaier (1877–1946); Luis Redonet y López-Dóriga (1875–1972); Francisco Rodríguez Marín (1855–1943); Antoni Rubió i Lluch (1856–1937); Ricardo León (1877–1943); Leopoldo Eijo Garay (1878–1963); Carlos María Cortezo (1850–1933); Cipriano Muñoz y Manzano (1862–1933)
8	Édouard Estaunié (1862–1942)	France	novel, essays	Erik Staaff (1867–1936)
9	John Galsworthy (1867–1933)	United Kingdom	novel, drama, essays, short story, memoir	Martin Lamm (1880–1950)
10	Stefan George (1868–1933)	Germany	poetry, translation	Andreas Hofgaard Winsnes (1889–1972)
11	Bertel Gripenberg (1878–1947)	Finland; Sweden	poetry, drama, essays	Rolf Lagerborg (1874–1959); Johannes Sundwall (1877–1966)
12	Hermann Hesse (1877–1962)	Germany; Switzerland	novel, poetry, short story, essays	Thomas Mann (1875–1955)
13	Francis Jammes (1868–1938)	France	poetry, songwriting, essays	Anders Österling (1884–1981)
14	Johannes Vilhelm Jensen (1873–1950)	Denmark	novel, short story, poetry	Johannes Brøndum-Nielsen (1881–1977); Anton Wilhelm Brøgger (1884–1951); Frederik Poulsen (1876–1950)
15	Erik Axel Karlfeldt (1864–1931)	Sweden	poetry	Nathan Söderblom (1866–1931)
16	Rudolf Kassner (1873–1959)	Austria	philosophy, essays, translation	19 professors from Austria, Germany and Switzerland (Note: Rudolf Kassner was nominated by 19 people, at least 10 of whom were Austrian, German and Swiss professors, eligible to make nominations.)
17	Ramón Menéndez Pidal (1869–1968)	Spain	philology, history	49 members of The Nobel Prize Committee of the Society of Authors (Note: Nominations from individuals, mostly professors, eligible to make nominations came from Algiers, Barcelona, Breslau, Buenos Aires, Brussels, Dublin, Glasgow, Granada, Groningen, Copenhagen, La Laguna, La Plata, Leeds, London, Madrid, Mexico, Montevideo, Murcia, Naples, Paris, Pothiers, Porto, Salamanca, San José de Costa Rica, Sevilla, Strasbourg, Torino, Toronto, Utrecht, Valencia, Valladolid, and from the United States (Berkeley, CA, Bloomington, IN, Cambridge, MA, Columbus, OH, Madison, WI, Iowa City, IA, Ithaca, NY, New York, Northampton, MA, and Princeton, NJ). A large number of nominations were also made by individuals whose eligibility to nominate was not confirmed.); 52 representatives at universities in Germany, Austria and Switzerland; 7 members of the Faculté de Philosophie et Lettres, Brussels; 14 members of the Lisbon Academy of Sciences; 6 members of the Real Academia de Bellas Artes de Toledo; 21 members of the Real Academia de la Historia; 27 members of the Royal Spanish Academy; Santiago Ramón y Cajal (1852–1934)
18	Dmitry Merezhkovsky (1865–1941)	Soviet Union	novel, essays, poetry, drama	Sigurd Agrell (1881–1937)
19	Laura Mestre Hevia (1867–1944)	Cuba	translation	Juan Miguel Dihigo Mestre (1866–1952)
20	Martin Andersen Nexø (1869–1954)	Denmark	novel, short story	Alfred Döblin (1878–1957)
21	Kostis Palamas (1859–1943)	Greece	poetry, essays	10 members of the Academy of Athens (Note: Kostis Palamas was also nominated by professors of Modern Greek in Paris, France and Leiden, Netherlands.); Simos Menardos (1871–1933)
22	Ramón Pérez de Ayala (1880–1962)	Spain	novel, poetry, literary criticism	Ramón Menéndez Pidal (1869–1968)
23	Erich Maria Remarque (Note: Remarque: Der Weg zurück ("The Road Back", 1931)) (1898–1970)	Germany	novel, short story, essays, drama	Tor Hedberg (1862–1931)
24	Ole Edvart Rølvaag (Note: Rølvaag: Giants in the Earth (1927)) (1876–1931)	Norway; United States	novel, short story, essays	Laurence Marcellus Larson (1868–1938)
25	Johann Rump (1871–1941) (pseud. Nathanael Jünger)	Germany	theology, essays	Fredrik Wulff (1845–1930)
26	Ivan Shmelyov (1873–1950)	Soviet Union; France	novel, short story	Thomas Mann (1875–1955)
27	Frans Eemil Sillanpää (1888–1964)	Finland	novel, short story, poetry	Rafael Erich (1879–1946)
28	Paul Valéry (1871–1945)	France	poetry, philosophy, essays, drama	Denis Saurat (1890–1958)
29	Anton Wildgans (1881–1932)	Austria	poetry, drama	Axel Romdahl (1880–1951) (Note: Anton Wildgans was also nominated by a 22 professors from Austria, who were eligible to nominate a candidate.)

=== Prize decision ===
In their report to the Swedish Academy dated 12 September 1931, the Nobel committee proposed that that year's Nobel Prize in Literature should be posthumously awarded to Erik Axel Karlfeldt: "With the death of E. A. Karlfeldt, the obstacle that in 1919 made it impossible for him to be awarded the Nobel Prize has been removed: his refusal to do so, in spite of the wish of the overwhelming majority of the Academy. His response can no longer be decisive, if the present Academy shares the same opinion about his worthiness for the prize. A written discussion on this matter would seem to be incompatible with the tradition of the Academy now as then. For the Committee, it seems sufficient to refer to the attendance that once existed around his name, an attendance for which the reasons have not since lost, but rather have grown in strength through his later work. For their part, they wish to express their support with complete agreement and lively conviction for the proposal to award E. A. Karlfeldt this year's Nobel Prize in Literature."

The Nobel committee's second proposal was John Galsworthy who was awarded the following year. The candidacy of Ivan Bunin, awarded in 1933, also attracted the Nobel committee: "The committee members have considered the proposed prize with keen interest, and although they have found that a couple of others should be given priority this year, they would like to speak out in principle in favor of its justification."

Considered but rejected candidates included Spanish philologist and historian Ramón Menéndez Pidal. The Nobel committee acknowledged "a truly classical creation of its kind, a rich and great life's work, distinguished also for the perfection in language and form which is an indispensable prerequisite for the Nobel Prize", but had doubts that Menéndez Pidal's field of work was within the scope of what should be awarded with the Nobel prize. Hermann Hesse, subsequently awarded in 1946, was dismissed with the justification: "despite his rare mastery of style and language, has not produced a sufficiently rich and sufficiently complete novel in its portrayal of life, for an award of the Nobel Prize to be fully justified. In addition, his ideal orientation, unusually clear and strong in its way, ends up in a complete ethical anarchy that would be difficult to reconcile with the aims of the prize founder."

On 8 November 1931, the Swedish Academy decided that the Nobel Prize in Literature should be awarded to "The poetry of Erik Axel Karlfeldt".

== Award ceremony ==
His wife, Gerda Holmberg–Karlfeldt, was the one who received the Nobel diploma, medal and monetary prize worth SEK173,206 from King Gustaf V and permanent secretary, Per Hallström.

In the award ceremony held on 10 December 1931, Anders Österling, Swedish Academy member, explained the Nobel Committee's justification of awarding the prize posthumously, by saying:

Thus the decision to honour the poetry of Erik Axel Karlfeldt with this year’s Nobel Prize is intended as an expression of justice by international standards. Death has stepped between the laureate and his reward; under the circumstances the Prize will be given to his family. He has left us, but his work remains. The tragic world of chance is outshone by the imperishable summer realm of poetry. Before our eyes we see the tomb in the dusk of winter. At the same time we hear the great victorious harmonies sung by the happiness of the creative genius; we feel the scents from the Northern pleasure garden that his poetry created for the comfort and joy of all receptive hearts.

== Reactions ==
The prize was controversial not just because it was the first and only time the Nobel Prize in Literature was awarded posthumously, but because the Academy had previously awarded two other Swedish writers of the same literary era, Selma Lagerlöf in 1909 and Verner von Heidenstam in 1916. The prize decision was not well received in the Swedish press. In newspapers such as Dagens Nyheter and Stockholms Dagblad the Swedish Academy's decision to posthumously award an author, particularly one who had refused to accept it before, was questioned and said to be against the purpose of the award. A positive reaction was however expressed in Svenska Dagbladet saying that while the award to Karlfeldt was surprising it "on closer deliberation prove to be not just justifiable but beautiful". Internationally, it was heavily criticized as few had heard of Karlfeldt.
