= Axiotis =

- Pronunciation: pronounced [ák.sio.tis]

Origin
- Origin: Greek
- Meaning: worthy, fit, suitable.
- Region of origin: Greece

Other names
- Variant forms: Axioti, Assiotis, Assioti, Aksiotis, Aksiote, Aksiyote, Aksote, Aksoti, Akşote, Akshoti, Akchoti, Akchoté

Axiotis (Greek: Αξιώτης) or Axioti/Axiotou (female equivalent) is a surname, and may refer to:

Axiotis derives from ἄξιος (axios) which means worthy in Greek with the suffix -της. (cf. ἄξιος) It could also come from Ἀξιός (cf. Axius) the river god and the ancient name for the Orontes and Vardar rivers. Axios is Thracian for 'not-shining' related to axšaēna the Avestan word for 'dark-coloured'.

- Alexandros Axiotis, Greek politician who took part in the Greek War of Independence
- Alexandros Axiotis (born 1996), Zambian swimmer
- Dimitrios Axiotis, Greek Paralympian athlete
- Angelos Axiotis, Greek songwriter
- Georgios Axiotis (1875–1924), Greek composer, pianist and music critic
- Diamantis Axiotis (born 1942), Greek poet and prose writer
- Kyriakos Axiotis (born 1993), Greek medalist in Balkan and International Olympiad in Informatics
- Kyrillos Axiotis (1908–1991), Greek hierarch, metropolitan of Chaldia, Cheroian and Kerasounta
- Paul Axiotis (born 1976) Greek biologist, Northern Illinois University
- Panayiotis Axiotis (1840–1918), Greek writer
- Stratis Axiotis (1907–1994), Greek hagiographer
- Melpo Axioti (1905–1973), Greek writer

== See also ==
- Akchoté
