= Carl Spitteler =

Swiss writer (1845–1924)

Carl Friedrich Georg Spitteler
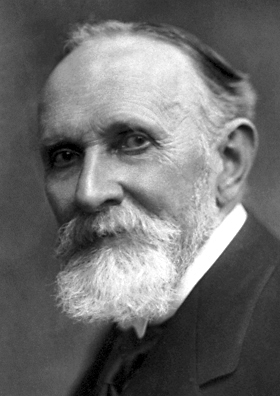
- Born: 24 April 1845; Liestal, Switzerland
- Died: 29 December 1924 (aged 79); Lucerne, Switzerland
- Education: University of Basel, Heidelberg University
- Occupation: Poet
- Writing career
- Language: German
- Notable awards: Nobel Prize in Literature; 1919

Carl Friedrich Georg Spitteler (24 April 1845 – 29 December 1924) was a Swiss poet who was awarded the Nobel Prize for Literature in 1919 "in special appreciation of his epic Olympian Spring". His work includes both pessimistic and heroic poems.

== Biography ==
Spitteler was born in Liestal. His father was an official of the government, being Federal Secretary of the Treasury from 1849 to 1856. Young Spitteler attended the gymnasium at Basel, having among his teachers philologist Wilhelm Wackernagel and historian Jacob Burckhardt. From 1863 he studied law at the University of Zurich. In 1865–1870 he studied theology in the same institution, at Heidelberg and Basel, though when a position as pastor was offered him, he felt that he must decline it. He had begun to realize his mission as an epic poet and therefore refused to work in the field for which he had prepared himself.

Later he worked in Russia as tutor, starting from August 1871, remaining there (with some periods in Finland) until 1879. Later he was elementary teacher in Bern and La Neuveville, as well as journalist for the Der Kunstwart and as editor for the Neue Zürcher Zeitung. In 1883 Spitteler married Marie op der Hoff, previously his pupil in Neuveville.

Under the pseudonym Carl Felix Tandem, Spitteler published the allegoric prose poem Prometheus and Epimetheus in 1881, contrasting between ideals and dogmas through the mythological figures of Prometheus and Epimetheus. This 1881 edition received an extended psychological exegesis by Carl Gustav Jung in his 1921 book Psychological Types. Spitteler later reworked the poem as Prometheus der Dulder (Prometheus the Sufferer), published in 1924 under his true name.

In 1882 he published his Extramundana, a collection of poems. He gave up teaching in 1885 and devoted himself to a journalistic career in Basel. Now his works began to come in rapid succession. In 1891 there appeared Friedli, der Kalderi, a collection of short stories, in which Spitteler, as he himself says, depicted Russian realism. Literarische Gleichnisse appeared in 1892, and Balladen in 1896.

In 1900–1905 Spitteler wrote the powerful allegoric-epic poem, in iambic hexameters, Olympischer Frühling (Olympic Spring). This work, mixing fantastic, naturalistic, religions and mythological themes, deals with human concern towards the universe. His prose works include Die Mädchenfeinde (Two Little Misogynists, 1907), about his autobiographical childhood experiences, the dramatic Conrad der Leutnant (1898), in which he show influence from the previously opposed Naturalism, and the autobiographical novella Imago (1906), examining the role of the unconscious in the conflict between a creative mind and the middle-class restrictions with internal monologue.

During World War I he opposed the pro-German attitude of the Swiss German-speaking majority, a position put forward in the essay "Unser Schweizer Standpunkt". In 1919 he won the Nobel Prize. Spitteler died at Lucerne in 1924.

Carl Spitteler's estate is archived in the Swiss Literary Archives in Bern, in the Zürich Central Library and in the Dichter- und Stadtmuseum in Liestal.

== In popular culture ==
Carl Jung claimed his idea of the archetype of the Anima was based upon what Spitteler described as 'My Lady Soul'. In 2015 artist and writer Tanja Stark first connected Spitteler (and Jung's) concept with musician David Bowie, who famously described himself as Jungian, in his 1973 song "Lady Grinning Soul".

== Works ==
All the works except the novel are untranslated and unavailable in English as of 2025.

=== Poetry ===
- Extramundana (Otherworldly, 1883) - 7 cosmic myths
- Schmetterlinge (Butterflies, 1889)
- Der Parlamentär (The Parliamentarian, 1889)
- Gustav (1892)
- Balladen (The Ballad, 1896)
- Conrad der Leutnant (Conrad the Lieutenant, 1898)
- Der olympische Frühling (The Olympian Spring, 1900–1905, revised 1910) - 4 volumes
1. Die Auffahrt (The Ascension)
2. Hera die Braut (Hera the Bride)
3. Die Hohe Zeit (The High Time)
4. Ende und Wende (End and Turning Point/End and Bend)
- Glockenlieder (Grass and Bell Songs, 1906)
- Die Mädchenfeinde (2 Little Misogynists, 1907)

==== Prometheus ====
1. Prometheus und Epimetheus (Prometheus and Epimetheus, 1881)
2. Prometheus der Dulder (Prometheus the Suffering, 1924)

=== Novel ===
- Imago (1906)

=== Non-fiction ===
==== Essays ====
- Literarische Gleichnisse ("Literary Parables", 1892)
- Lachende Wahrheiten (Laughing Truth, 1898)

==== Autobiography ====
- Meine frühesten Erlebnisse ("My Earliest Experiences", 1914)
