= Nordens Frihet =

Weekly political magazine in Sweden (1940–1945)

- Editor: Harald Wigforss
- Categories: Political magazine
- Frequency: Weekly (March 1940–April 1944); Monthly (April 1944–December 1945)
- Founder: Samfundet Nordens Frihet
- Founded: 1940
- First issue: 28 March 1940
- Final issue: December 1945
- Country: Sweden
- Language: Swedish

Nordens Frihet (Swedish: Nordic Freedom) was a Swedish language anti-Nazi weekly magazine that was published by Samfundet Nordens Frihet, an association established to support the independence of the Nordic countries. The magazine existed between March 1940 and December 1945.

== History and profile ==
Nordens Frihet was started by an association, Samfundet Nordens Frihet, on 28 March 1940. The editorial board consisted of ten individuals, including historian Nils Ahnlund and writer Eyvind Johnson, who were all members of the association. Its editor was Harald Wigforss.

The magazine was published on a weekly basis until April 1944 when its frequency was switched to monthly. It had an anti-Fascist political stance and encouraged the independence of the Nordic countries during World War II. Following the invasion of Denmark and Norway by the Nazi forces in April 1940 it called for the formation of a defensive alliance by Sweden and Finland. The magazine was also against Soviet Union's policies of invasion.

Nordens Frihet ceased publication in December 1945.
