= Akchoté =

Akchoté is a surname and may refer to:

- Noël Akchoté (born 1968), French guitarist
- Sebastian Akchoté alias Sebastian (born 1981), French musician

== See also ==
- Axiotis
