= Karlbo =

Settlement in Avesta Municipality, Sweden

Coordinates: 60°07′N 16°14′E

Karlbo is a village in Avesta Municipality, Dalarna, Sweden. Erik Axel Karlfeldt was born here.
