= Samfundet Nordens Frihet =

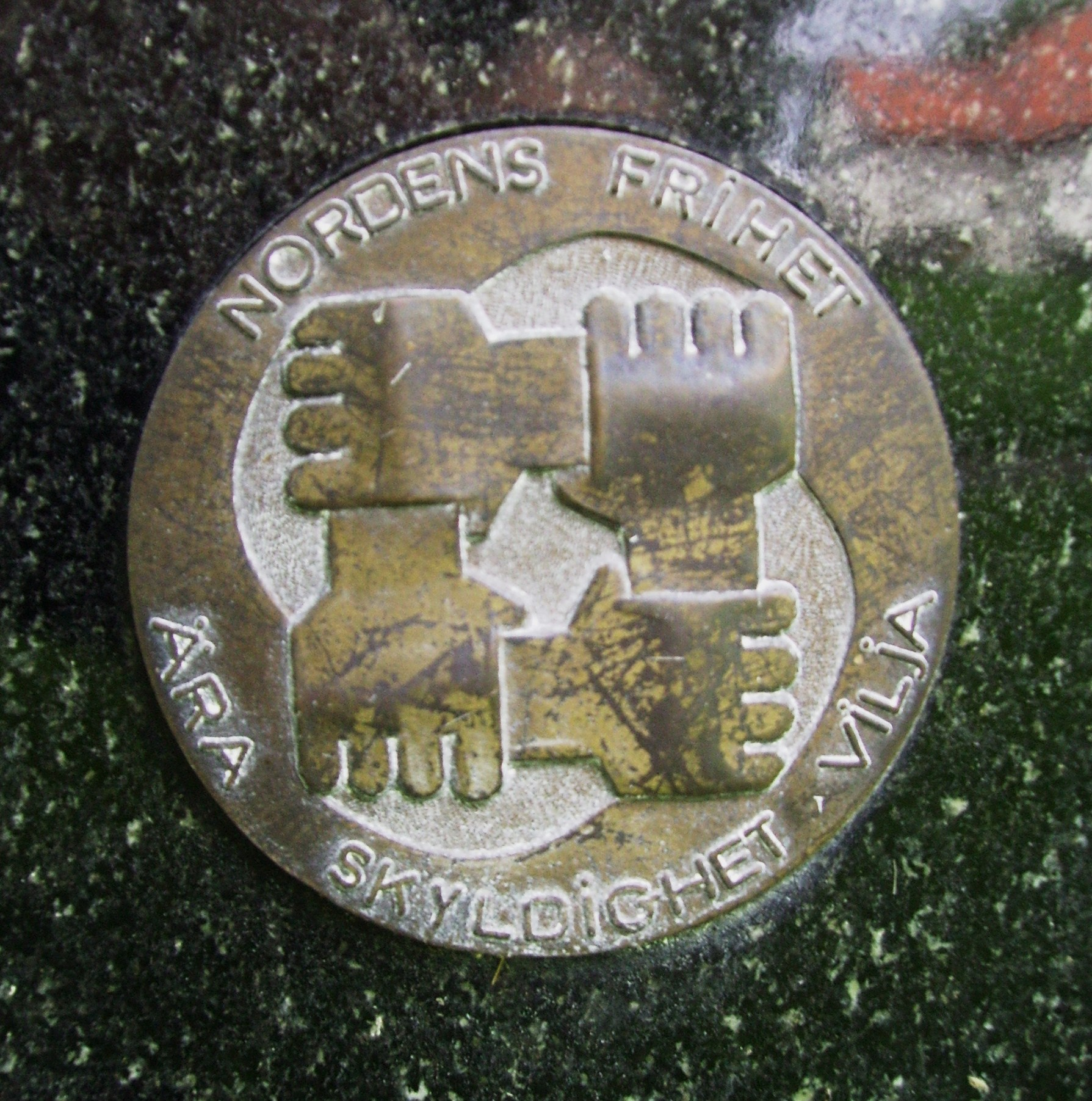
A plaque on a gravestone with the foundation's motto Ära Skyldighet Vilja (Honor - Duty - Will).

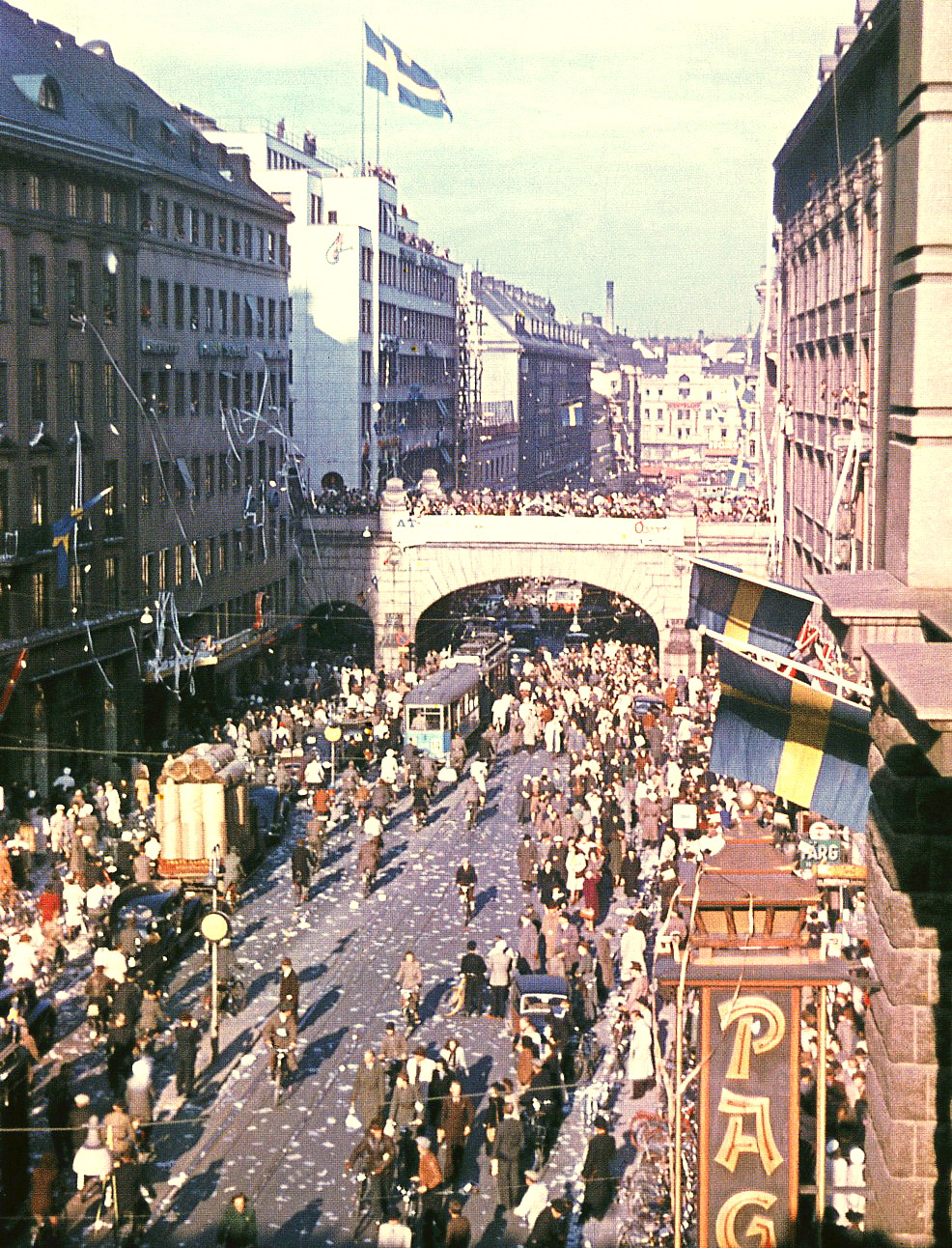
The society’s editorial board was located in 27 Kungsgatan, Stockholm to the left in the picture. Picture from, Victory in Europe Day 1945.

Samfundet Nordens Frihet (Swedish: [ˈsâmːˌfɵnːdɛt ˈnǔːɖɛns ˈfrîːheːt], "Nordic Freedom Society") was a Swedish association founded in 1939 to promote independence for the Nordic countries during the Second World War. The association was dissolved in 1946.

== History ==
Initially Samfundet Nordens Frihet was closely linked to the “Finlandskommittén” (Finland Committee), which worked to assist Finland with volunteer military forces. After the German occupation of Norway and Denmark in 1940, the society considered that Sweden should join the war.

Politically, the society was against Nazism and Communism. At most it had 250 members, among them many prominent cultural figures. Almost 50% of the members were academics in the field of History. “The core group consisted of members of the senior seminar on history at Stockholm University.”

Society membership was applied by election, Sigurd Curman was the first president and Harald Wigforss was editor of the society’s journal, Nordens Frihet. Other leading members of the society included the Stockholm municipal commissioner Yngve Larsson, Nils Ahnlund, Harald Hjärne, Eli Heckscher, Karl-Gustaf Hildebrand, Nils Herlitz, Stig Jägerskiöld, K.G. Westman, Adolf Schück, Birger Steckzén and Andreas Lindblom. Larsson, Ahnlund and Lindbom were members of the board throughout the society’s existence.

The board members Gustaf Aulén, Yngve Larsson, Knut Petersson, and Henning Throne-Holst received The Royal Norwegian Order of St. Olav.

== See also ==
- Sweden and the Winter War
