= Erik Axel Karlfeldt =

Swedish poet

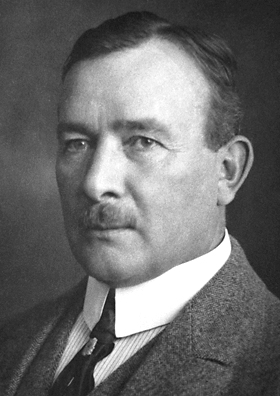
- Karlfeldt in 1931
- Born: Erik Axel Eriksson; 20 July 1864; Karlbo, Sweden
- Died: 8 April 1931 (aged 66); Stockholm, Sweden
- Occupation: Poet
- Writing career
- Notable awards: 1931 Nobel Prize in Literature

Member of the Swedish Academy (Seat No. 11)
- In office 20 December 1904 – 8 April 1931
- Preceded by: Clas Theodor Odhner
- Succeeded by: Torsten Fogelqvist

Permanent Secretary of the Swedish Academy
- In office February 1913 – April 1931
- Preceded by: Hans Hildebrand
- Succeeded by: Per Hallström

Erik Axel Karlfeldt (20 July 1864 – 8 April 1931) was a Swedish poet whose highly symbolist poetry masquerading as regionalism was popular and won him the 1931 Nobel Prize in Literature posthumously after he had been nominated by Nathan Söderblom, member of the Swedish Academy. Karlfeldt had been offered the award already in 1919 but refused to accept it, because of his position as permanent secretary to the Swedish Academy (1913–1931), which awards the prize.

== Biography ==
Karlfeldt was born into a farmer's family in Karlbo, in the province of Dalarna. Initially, his name was Erik Axel Eriksson, but he assumed his new name in 1889, wanting to distance himself from his father, who had suffered the disgrace of a criminal conviction. He studied at Uppsala University, simultaneously supporting himself by teaching school in several places, including Djursholms samskola in the Stockholm suburb of Djursholm and at a school for adults. After completing his studies, he held a position at the Royal Library of Sweden, in Stockholm, for five years.

In 1904, Karlfeldt was elected a member of the Swedish Academy and held chair number 11. In 1905, he was elected a member of the Nobel Institute of the academy, and, in 1907, of the Nobel Committee. In 1912, he was elected permanent secretary of the academy, a position he held until his death.

Uppsala University, Karlfeldt's alma mater, awarded him the title of Doctor honoris causae in 1917.

Karlfeldt was a pantheist.

== Works in English ==
- Modern Swedish Poetry Part 1 (1929) – (trans. by C. D. Locock)
- Arcadia Borealis (1938) – (trans. by Charles Wharton Stork)
- The North! To the North! (2001) – (trans. by Judith Moffett, five poets including Karlfeldt)

Cultural offices
Preceded by Clas Theodor Odhner	Swedish Academy, Seat No 11; 1904–1931	Succeeded by Torsten Fogelqvist
