= Donald Alfred Stauffer =

American literary critic, novelist and academic (1902–1952)

- Born: July 4, 1902; Colorado, U.S.
- Died: August 8, 1952 (aged 50); Oxford, England
- Education: Princeton University, A.B. (1923), A.M. (1924); Merton College, Oxford, D.Phil. (1928)
- Occupation: Literary critic

Donald Alfred Stauffer (July 4, 1902 – August 8, 1952) was an American literary critic, novelist and Professor of English who spent the majority of his career at Princeton University.

== Biography ==
Stauffer studied at Princeton University, where he completed his A.B. degree in 1923 and A.M. degree in 1924. He received both a Guggenheim Fellowship and Rhodes Scholarship to Merton College, Oxford, where he completed his D.Phil. degree in 1928. After completing his doctorate he returned to Princeton, where he spent most of his career as Professor of English and English Department Chairman.

He held the Eastman Professorship at the University of Oxford from 1951 to 1952. He unexpectedly died in Oxford in August 1952, aged 50.

His books included English Biography Before 1700 (Harvard, 1930). and The Nature of Poetry (Norton, 1946).

== Bibliography ==
- English Biography Before 1700 (1930)
- The Art of Biography in 18th Century England (1941)
- The Intent of the Critic (1941)
- Brother, This Is War (1945)
- The Nature of Poetry (1946)
- The Saint and the Hunchback (1946)
