= Maurice Le Boucher =

French organist, composer and music educator (1882–1964)

- Born: Maurice Georges Eugène Le Boucher; 25 May 1882; Isigny-sur-Mer, Calvados, Normandy, France
- Died: 9 November 1964 (aged 82); Paris, France
- Education: Conservatoire de Paris
- Occupations: Organist; composer; music educator
- Years active: 1910s–1942
- Employers: École Niedermeyer de Paris; Saint-Germain l'Auxerrois; Montpellier Conservatory
- Style: Classical

Maurice Georges Eugène Le Boucher (25 May 1882 – 9 September 1964), was a French organist, composer, and music educator.

Le Boucher was born in Isigny-sur-Mer. In 1904, he entered the Conservatoire de Paris, where he was a student of Gabriel Fauré. In 1907, Le Boucher won the prestigious Grand Prix de Rome. Later, he became professor at the École Niedermeyer de Paris and organist at Saint-Germain l'Auxerrois in Paris. He wrote an Organ Symphony in E major, which was published in 1917 by Éditions Leduc, Paris. He wrote a drama on Oscar Wilde's La Duchesse de Padoue which was published by Salabert in 1931. In 1920, he was appointed as director of the Montpellier Conservatory, a post he held for 22 years. His students included André David.

Le Boucher died in 1964 in Paris.

== Works ==
- Symphonie pour orgue en Mi Majeur (1917)
- Ballade en Ré Mineur, clarinet and orchestra (clarinet and piano)
- La Duchesse de Padoue (libretto by P. Grosfil after Wilde; 1931)
