= André Bonnard =

Swiss Hellenist (1888–1959)

André Bonnard (16 August 1888 – 18 October 1959) was a Swiss Hellenist, translator, university professor, and public intellectual.

== Biography ==
Bonnard was born into an upper-class intellectual Protestant family in his hometown of Lausanne. His father Jean was a teacher. He studied at the Faculté des Lettres at the university there and at the Sorbonne University in Paris. After obtaining his Licence ès lettres, he taught at a school in Mulhouse from 1910 to 1915, then in Rolle and from 1915 to 1928 at the Collège and the Gymnase classique of Lausanne. In 1928, without a doctorate, he was appointed professor of Greek language and literature at the Faculté des Lettres of the University of Lausanne, a position he held until 1957. From 1932 to 1934 and from 1942 to 1944 he was also doyen of the Faculté des Lettres.

Under the impression the First World War, Bonnard became a pacifist intellectual. Admiring the Soviet support for the Republicans during the Spanish Civil War and later the successes of the Red Army at the end of the Second World War, he was led to see how Stalin's Soviet Union reflected his humanist and pacifist ideals. His praise of Soviet literature (1948) made him a suspect for the Swiss authorities and resultsed in him being monitored for years.

In 1949, he was elected chairman of the pro-Soviet Mouvement Suisse des partisans de la Paix (Swiss Peace Movement) and a member of the World Peace Council. In 1952, he was arrested while going to the Berlin congress of the World Peace Council and charged with treason for espionage on behalf of the Soviet Union. The trial took place in 1954 and ended with a light sentence of being suspended for fifteen days. Ultimately, he had to resign from his chair before the end of his term without receiving the usual fee (the honorary professorship). His case was one of the most publicized political trials in French-speaking Switzerland during the Cold War. In 1954, he received the Stalin Peace Prize in Vienna.

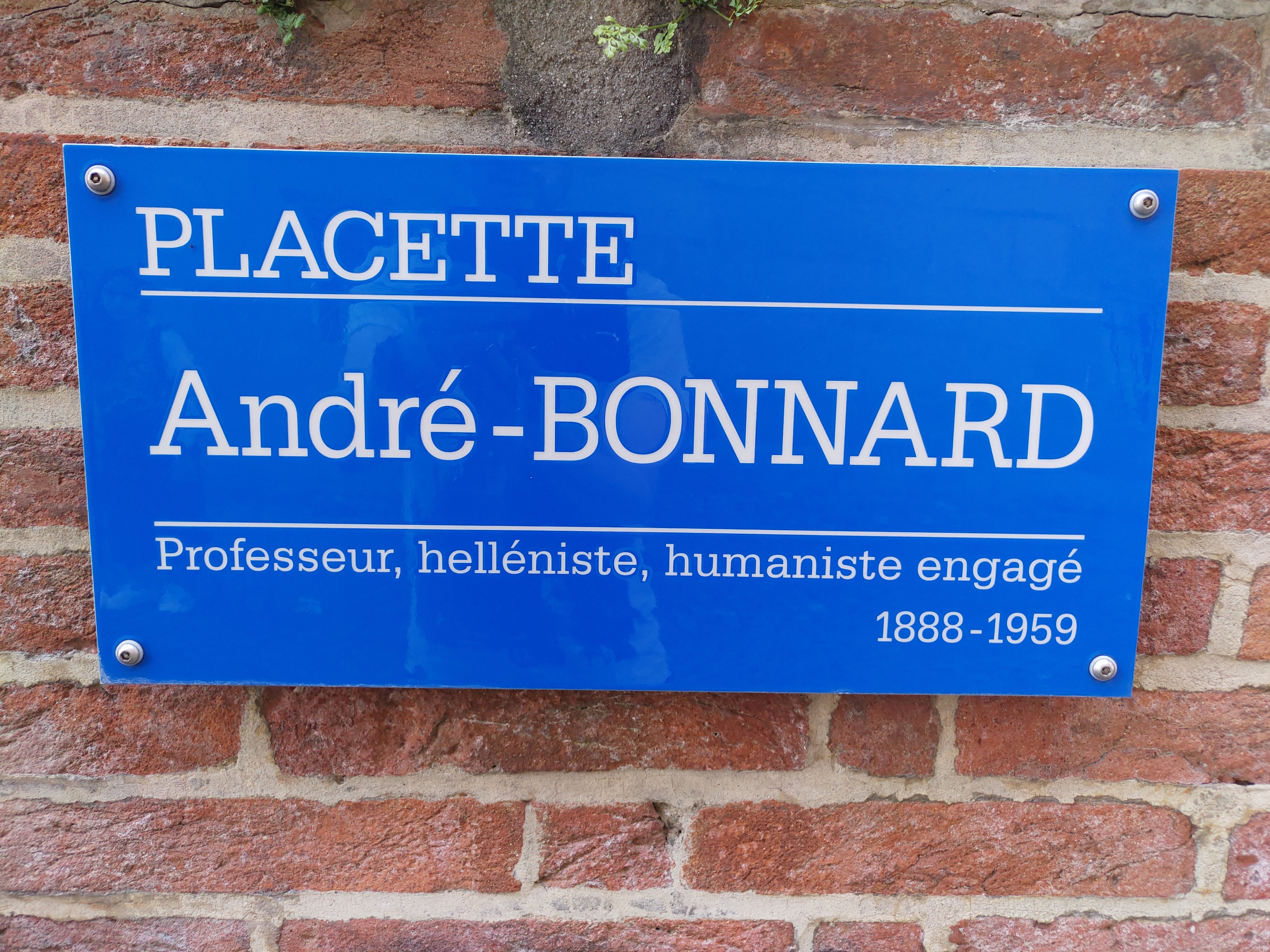
Street sign of Placette André-Bonnard in Lausanne.

Being isolated from most of his friends and colleagues, Bonnard dedicated the last years of his life to private scholarship and his publications. His funeral took place without any ceremony.

His memory was rehabilitated in the 1990s. Today, a small square near the Ancienne Académie is named after him (since 1992), as is an auditorium at the University of Lausanne in Dorigny (since 2004).

== Works ==
=== Ancient Greek studies ===
The three most important studies by André Bonnard are Les dieux de la Grèce (1944), La tragédie et l'homme (1950) and the three-volume Greek Civilization, which was published between 1954 and 1959. That 900-page book on Greek civilization is André Bonnard's intellectual testament. Greek Civilization is the synthesis of all his previous reflections on man, culture and art. Bonnard saw in Greece from Homer to Epicurus a special time when humanity achieved a rare perfection. The book has been translated into several languages, including English.

=== Translations ===
André Bonnard was known for his translations of Greek tragedies. He did not have specialists in mind, but mainly readers and theater makers. The translations are poetic and were inspired by Racine and Jean Giraudoux:

- 1928 - Prometheus Bound (Prométhée enchaîné) by Aeschylus
- 1938 - Antigone by Sophocles
- 1942 - Iphigeneia in Aulis (Iphigénie à Aulis) by Euripides
- 1946 - Oedipus Rex (Œdipe Roi) by Sophocles
- 1948 - Alcestis by Euripides
- 1952 - Agamemnon by Aeschylus
