= Laura Mestre Hevia =

Cuban translator (1867–1944)

- Born: 6 April 1867; Havana, Captaincy General of Cuba, Spanish Empire
- Died: 11 January 1944 (aged 56); Havana, Cuba
- Occupations: Translator, humanist, writer

Laura Mestre Hevia (6 April 1867 – 11 January 1944) was a Cuban translator, humanist and writer. Some of her work was published, and at her death she left unpublished translations into Spanish of the works of Homer.

== Life ==
Laura Mestre Hevia was born in Havana on 6 April 1867. She was the daughter of Dr. Antonio Mestre y Domínguez (1834–87), who founded several scientific societies in Cuba and introduced the ideas of Charles Darwin. Her family was cultured. Unusually for the time, it was accepted that women were equal, entitled to higher education and need not marry. At the age of 18 she and her sister Fidelia published a translation of a French novel, La sombra by M. A. Gennevraye. She visited Paris and Italy, and was in Florence in 1893, although she later claimed to hate travel.

Although she did not have a formal academic career, she studied the programs given by the Faculty of Philosophy and Arts, and she learned Latin, Greek, French, English and Italian, and the literature of these languages. After being unjustly denied the position of director of the Colegio Heredia she gave up any attempt to play a role in public life, and dedicated herself to her studies. In her view the art, literature and philosophy of the Greeks included values and qualities that should be included in the education of young people, and should be based on Homer's works. Laura Mestre Hevia died in Havana on 11 January 1944.

== Work ==
Laura Mestre translated Homer's poems, the Iliad and the Odyssey, into Spanish, the first woman to do so, but only fragments were published. She also translated the epinikia of Pindar, poems by Sappho and Anacreon, and popular songs of modern Greece in her 1929 Estudios griegos. In 1939 she published Literatura Moderna. Estudios y narraciones. When she died she left manuscripts and drafts for four books: Naturaleza, Elementos de Dibujo y Pintura (Nature, Elements of Drawing and Painting), Las Disertaciones, also called Morbidezza, Florencia and her translations of the Iliad and the Odyssey, with a translation of Cicero's dialogue on friendship, since lost.

== Publications ==
- Laura Mestre (1929), Estudios griegos, La Habana: Imprenta Avisador comercial, p. 269
- Laura Mestre (1930), Literatura Moderna. Estudios y narraciones, La Habana: Imprenta Avisador comercial, p. 258
- Laura Mestre (July 1912), "La enumeración de las naves", Revista de la Facultad de Letras y Ciencias de la Universidad de La Habana (Translation of a passage of Book 2 of the Ilíad) (15): 19–27
- Laura Mestre (May 1913 – July 1915), "Lecciones de lengua griega sobre un texto de Homero", Revista de la Facultad de Letras y Ciencias de la Universidad de La Habana (16.3, 17.1, 17.2, 19.1, 19.3, 21.1)
- Laura Mestre (1919), "Evolución del arte", Revista de la Facultad de Letras y Ciencias de la Universidad de La Habana (29.3): 213–232
- Laura Mestre (1922), "Teoría del arte literario", Revista de la Facultad de Letras y Ciencias de la Universidad de La Habana (32): 50–76
- Laura Mestre (1923), "Idealizaciones de la poesía cubana", Revista de la Facultad de Letras y Ciencias de la Universidad de La Habana (33): 216–246
- Laura Mestre (1928), "De la poesía lírica griega: Píndaro, Safo y Anacreonte", Revista de la Facultad de Letras y Ciencias de la Universidad de La Habana (38): 91–117

== Sources ==
- Miranda Cancela, Elina, "Laura Mestre Hevia", Catalogus Philologorum Classicorum (in Spanish)
- Miranda Cancela, Elina (2001), "Laura Mestre, helenista y traductora de Homero", CFC
- Miranda, Elina, Traductores : Laura Mestre Hevia (La Habana, 1887 – La Habana, 1944), Fundación Biblioteca Virtual Miguel de Cervantes
