= Melchor Fernández Almagro =

Spanish writer and politician (1893–1966)

The Most Excellent Melchor Fernández Almagro
- Born: 4 September 1893; Granada, Spain
- Died: 22 February 1966 (aged 72); Madrid, Spain

Seat D of the Real Academia Española
- In office 9 December 1951 – 22 February 1966
- Preceded by: Manuel Machado
- Succeeded by: Torcuato Luca de Tena Brunet

Melchor Fernández Almagro (4 September 1893 – 22 February 1966) was a Spanish writer, historian, journalist, literary critic, and civil governor of Baleares.

Fernández Almagro was elected to seat D of the Real Academia Española, he took up his seat on 9 December 1951.
