= Imago (novel) =

1906 novel by Carl Spitteler

- Author: Carl Spitteler
- Language: German
- Genre: Fiction
- Published: 1906
- Publisher: E. Diederichs
- Publication place: Switzerland
- Pages: 229

Imago is a 1906 autobiographical novel by Carl Spitteler. Spitteler's only novel, it tells of how a young writer returns to a small town where, four years earlier, he had met a woman who became his muse, only to learn that, in his absence, she has married someone else.

== Influence ==
The book was cited by Sigmund Freud, Carl Jung, and Hanns Sachs as a contributory factor in the early development of psychoanalysis. Charles Baudouin proposed that Spitteler's prose works are intended as "commentaries on his major poems", and observed that Imago is "puzzling" unless read from this viewpoint.
