= Kazimierz Zalewski =

Polish dramatist (1849–1919)

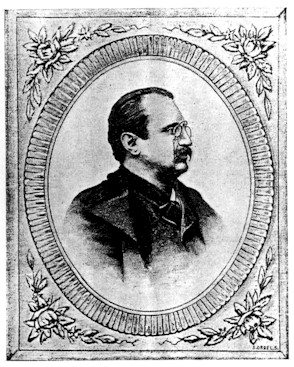
- Kazimierz Zalewski, reproduction from magazine Kłosy, 1887
- Born: December 5, 1849; Płock, Congress Poland
- Died: January 11, 1919 (aged 69); Warsaw, Poland
- Occupations: dramatist, novelist
- Writing career
- Pen name: Jerzy Myriel
- Movement: Positivism

Kazimierz Zalewski (December 5, 1849 – January 11, 1919), pseudonym Jerzy Myriel, was a Polish dramatist, literary and theatre critic, one of the leading author of middle-class positivistic drama.

Zalewski was born in Płock. He was the publisher and editor of the magazine Wiek (1875–1905), and managing director of Teatr Mały in Warsaw from 1909 until his death, in Warsaw.

== Notable works ==
Socio-psychological comedies

- Przed ślubem (1875)
- Dama treflowa (1879)
- Górą nasi (1885)
- Nasi zięciowie (1886)
- Małżeństwo Apfel (1887)

Novels

- Syn przemytnika (1884)
