= Amelia Agostini de Del Río =

Puerto Rican writer

Amelia Agostini de del Río
- in the Catskill mountains in 1929
- Born: 1896; Yauco, Puerto Rico
- Died: December 11, 1996 (aged 99–100); Spring Lake, New Jersey
- Occupations: Writer, professor
- Writing career
- Period: 20th century

Amelia Agostini de del Río ( 1896 – December 11, 1996) was a Puerto Rican writer, educator, and scholar of Puerto Rico history. She was head of the Spanish department at Barnard College for more than twenty years and wrote literary criticism, drama, poetry, and narrative essays about life in Puerto Rico and the experience of the Puerto Rican diaspora in New York City.

== Biography ==
Amelia Agostini Bonelli was born in the mountain town of Yauco, Puerto Rico in 1896. She was the daughter of Alejandro Agostini-Negroni and Isaura Bonelli. She received her schooling in her hometown and was awarded a scholarship to study at the normal school of the University of Puerto Rico. She studied education at the university and graduated in 1917. She moved to New York in 1918 to attend Vassar College, graduating in 1922 as a member of Phi Beta Kappa. She moved back to Puerto Rico and taught high school in the Santurce neighborhood. During this time she also worked in theater, writing, directing, and acting in plays.

In 1929 she married literary critic Angel del Río, who had been her instructor at the University of Puerto Rico. He was one of several intellectuals who lived in New York and Puerto Rico as exiles during the Spanish Civil War and the dictatorship of Franco. In the 1940s and 1950s they regularly hosted Spanish intellectuals and writers such as Pedro Salinas, Jorge Guillén, Camilo José Cela, Gabriela Mistral, and Federico García Lorca at their house.

She began teaching Spanish language and literature at Barnard College in 1929. Agostini served as the head of the Spanish department from 1941 to 1962. While at Barnard she acted in a number of Spanish plays, including a leading role in Federico García Lorca's The House of Bernarda Alba. She also organized the theater program of the Spanish school of Middlebury College along with directing and acting in plays at the school.

Agostini earned two additional degrees in Spanish, a master's degree from Columbia University in 1932 and a Ph.D. from the Complutense University of Madrid in 1958.

After the death of her husband in 1962, Agostini returned to Puerto Rico, where she continued teaching and wrote for local newspapers, particularly El Imparcial. In 1985 she founded the Museo de Reproducciones Artisticas in Bayamón, Puerto Rico. She was elected president of the Sociedad de Autores Puertorriqueños. She died at the age of 100 on December 11, 1996, in Spring Lake, New Jersey. He was buried at Kensico Cemetery in Valhalla, New York.

== Writing ==
Agostini's publishing career began to develop in the 1950s. She wrote more than 45 books of literary criticism, prose narrative, poetry, plays, children's stories, and art history. She collaborated with playwright Emilio S. Belaval on several plays, including La romanticona (1926). She often employed the conventions of costumbrismo, focusing on local color and seeking to celebrate Caribbean life and cultures.

Many of Agostini's works are informed by a strong sense of place. Her Viñetas de Puerto Rico (1965) features her recollections of the people and locations of her hometown, Yauco. Canto a San Juan de Puerto Rico y otros poemas (1974) also features many scenes from Yauco. Puertorriqueños en New York (1970) consists of narrative portraits illustrating slices of life from fellow members of the Puerto Rican diaspora. She also wrote of her grief as a widow in her 1964 elegies Con el duelo de mi corazón. Her writing and scholarship was heavily influenced by her wide network of intellectual colleagues.

Agostini and her husband co-edited Antologia general de la literatura española: verso prosa teatro in 1951, which was published in multiple editions and assigned widely in teaching Spanish literature.

== Recognition ==
Mayor Robert Wagner gave Agostini a key to the city of New York. She received the Ciudadana del Año (Citizen of the Year) award from the Institute of Puerto Rico in 1954 and the Orden del Cafetal award from the town of Yauco in 1984. Agostini also received the highest civilian honor in Spain.
