= David Baumgardt =

German professor of philosophy (1890–1963)

David Baumgardt (20 April 1890 – 21 July 1963) was an early 20th-century German Jewish philosopher in the field of philosophical history. He was a professor of philosophy at the University of Berlin.

== Early life and education ==
Baumgardt was born in Erfurt, German Empire. As a young man he studied at the universities of Freiburg, Vienna, Munich, Heidelberg and Berlin, and served in the military during World War I.

== Career ==
Baumgardt's main field of studies was ancient philosophy and ethics. He wrote about the relationship between ethical and religious ideology.

He emigrated to Great Britain in 1935 and to the United States in 1939.

Some years before his death he wrote a retrospective of his years at the University of Berlin, entitled, Looking Back on a German University Career, which was published in 1965.

Later in his life he was a consultant in philosophy to the American Library of Congress. During his career at the Library of Congress Baumgardt acted as the interpreter to Bertolt Brecht during his House Un-American Activities Committee hearing. Of which it was said that his English was worse than that of who he was interpreting.

Many commentaries were written about his work, including David Baumgardt and ethical hedonism by Zeev Levy and also Aristotle Ethical views by Mehdi Shokri.

== Legacy ==
Baumgardt died in Long Beach, New York, United States.

A fellowship is offered by the Leo Baeck Institute, which houses a collection of his papers, to students who study and extend Baumgardt's work.

== Main works ==
- Franz v. Baader und die philosophische Romantik, 1927.
- Der Kampf um den Lebenssinn unter Vorläufern der modernen Ethik, 1933.
- Bentham and the Ethics of Today, 1952.
- Great Western Mystics and their Lasting Significance, 1961.
- Die abendländische Mystik, 1963.
