= Melpo Axioti =

- Μέλπω Αξιώτη
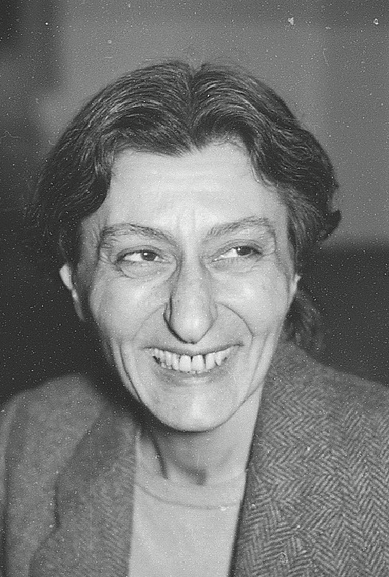
- Born: 15 July 1905; Kalamata, Greece
- Died: 22 May 1973 (aged 67); Athens, Greece
- Education: National and Kapodistrian University of Athens
- Occupation: poet
- Writing career
- Language: Greek
- Literary movement: neo-romanticim

Melpo Axioti (Greek: Μέλπω Αξιώτη; 15 July 1905 – 22 May 1973) was a Greek writer who professed to Communism. She wrote in modern Greek. She spent most of her exile from 1947 to 1964, in the German Democratic Republic.

== Life and work ==
The daughter of musician and composer Georgios Axiotis, she was raised on the Greek island of Mykonos without a mother. From 1918 to 1922 she attended the school of the Ursulines on the island of Tinos. After a short marriage with her theology professor Vassilis Markaris she went to Athens in 1930, where she soon debuted with short stories in the magazine Mykoniatika Chronika. She was one of the pioneers of Greek surrealism. In 1937 her first novel Heavy Nights was published and she received in 1939 the 1st Prize of the Women's Association of Letters and Arts.

In the meantime she had become a member of the Communist Party of Greece. During the Axis occupation of Greece she participated in the underground work of the communist-controlled National Liberation Front. With the persecution of communists during the Greek Civil War, in 1947 she went to exile in France, where she became acquainted with the likes of Louis Aragon, Pablo Neruda and Pablo Picasso. Expelled in 1950, she found admission in the GDR, interrupted only by short stay in Warsaw. While teaching Modern Greek and History of Modern Greek Literature at the Humboldt University of Berlin, several books of Axioti were translated and published by GDR publishers.

Her much-read novel about the 20th century (from 1946) deals with the uncompromising and correspondingly loss-resisting resistance of Greek women to fascism (and the German Wehrmacht). The poetry collection Kontrabandp (1959) leads to friendship and cooperation with Yiannis Ritsos. In 1964 Axioti receives an official entry permit to return to her homeland. However, increasingly struggling with illnesses, dying in 1973 and being buried in the Zografou cemetery. In 1989, Gay Aggeli presented a 35-minute documentary titled The Life and Work of Melpo Axioti.

== Works ==
Among her most notable works were:

- Dyskoles Nychtes (Heavy Nights), novel, 1937
- Symptosi (Coincidence), Long Poem, 1939
- Thelete na chorepsoume, Maria? (Maria, would you like to dance with me?), novel, 1940
- Apantisi se pente erotimata (Answer to Five Questions), historical chronicle 1945
- Eikostos Aionas (20th century), novel, 1946 (Berlin 1949, plus French, Bulgarian, Czech, Polish, Italian)
- Syntrofoi, Kalimera! (Good day, comrades!), short stories, 1953 (German In the shadow of the Acropolis, Berlin 1955)
- Kontrabando (Contraband), 1959 (German Contraband: Eine Dichtung, Berlin 1961)
- Kadmo, prose piece, Athens 1972
