= Axel Romdahl =

Swedish art historian and museum curator

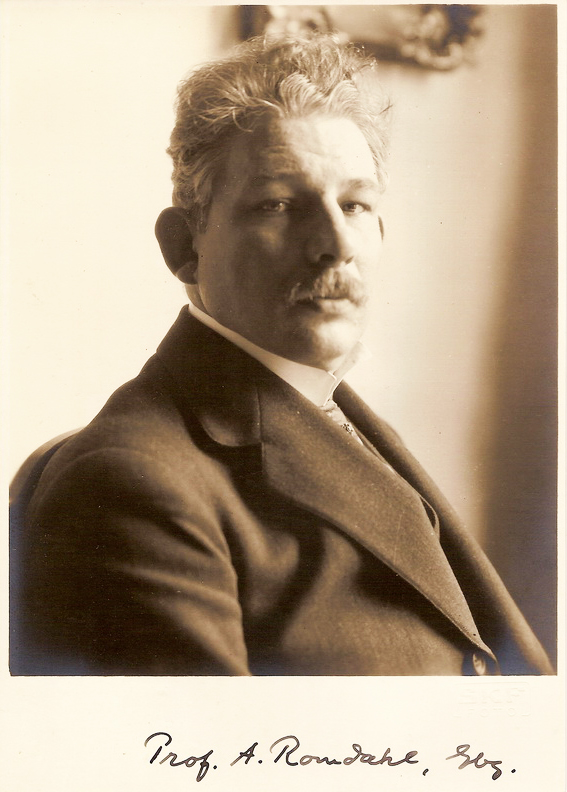
Signed photographic portrait of Axel Romdahl

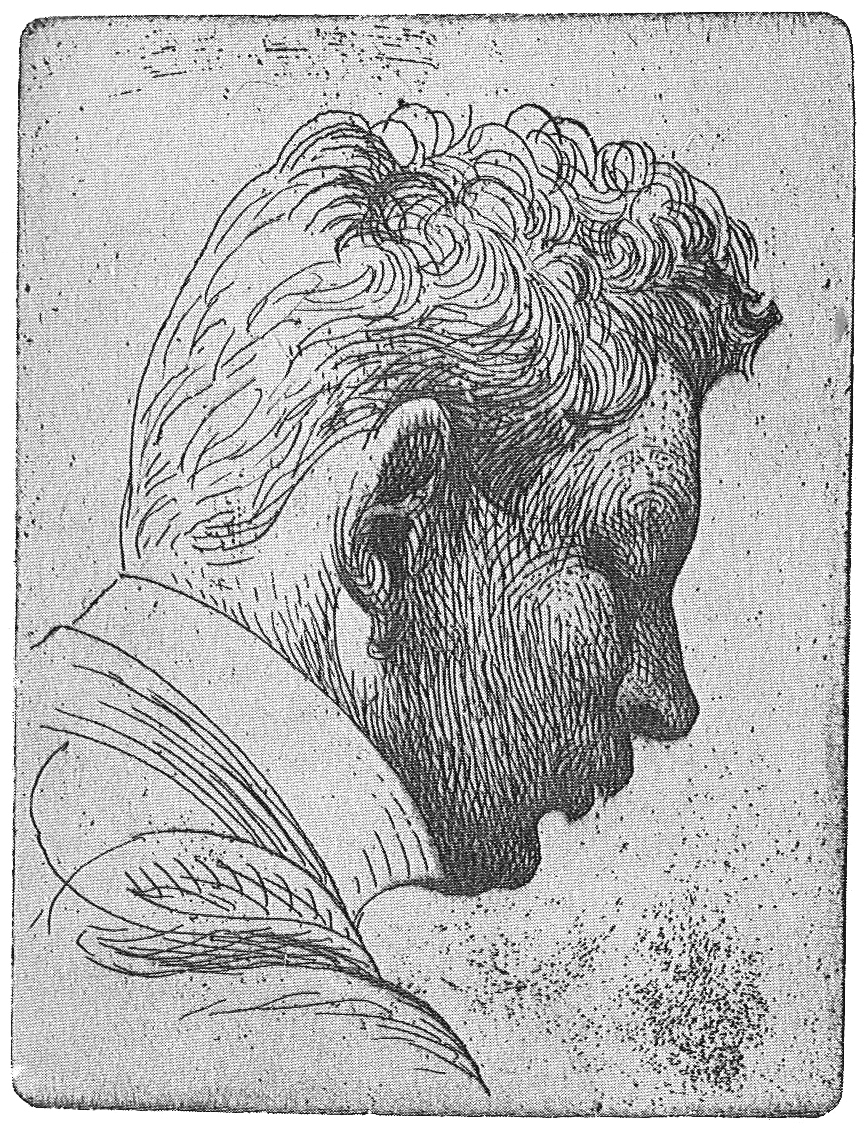
Etching of Axel Romdahl by Carl Larsson, 1912 or earlier

Axel Ludvig Romdahl (18 March 1880 – 14 May 1951) was a Swedish art historian and museum curator.

== Biography ==
Axel Ludvig, known as Ludde, was the son of P. A. C. Romdahl and Clara Theresia Brogren. He married Gudrun Biller in 1906 in Stockholm.

He took his bachelor's degree in Uppsala in 1900, and his doctorate in 1905. He began work at Sweden's National Museum in Stockholm in 1903, and at the Nordic Museum in 1904. He moved to Gothenburg in April 1906, becoming curator of Gothenburg's Art Museum and a lecturer in Gothenburg's High School; in 1920 he became a professor there. He was extremely knowledgeable and had a strong feeling for artwork.

Romdahl quickly established himself as one of the major cultural figures in the town, making contact with art collectors and painters such as Anders Zorn, Carl Larsson och Edvard Munch, to the benefit of the Art Museum.

Romdahl became leader of the governing body of the Handicraft Union's school in 1909, of the committee for the Charles Felix Lindberg Donation Fund, and of the Röhsska Museum. He was commissioner of the 1923 Gothenburg Exhibition. Romdahl's many friends and contacts included Leonard Jägerskiöld, Erland Nordenskiöld, and Albert Ulrik Bååth and he seems to have liked Gothenburg.

Even when Romdahl arrived in Gothenburg there was a great lack of space in the East India Company building at Stora Hamnkanalen. After years of discussions, the new museum at Götaplatsen was built; it served as the main entrance to the Gothenburg Exhibition and then grew to become the city's cultural centre. The art museum also served as the backdrop for the long prospect up Kungsports Avenue. His life's work is symbolised by the art museum and Linköping Cathedral; in 1911–16 he and Sigurd Curman conducted building historical studies there.

Romdahl was a member of the Saturday Group (Lördagsslaget) in Gothenburg, which met on Saturdays to discuss politics. He went on study trips to several European countries, and published papers on art history including on Michelangelo in 1943. He received the City of Gothenburg's Merit Award in 1948.

There is a sketch of Romdahl by Bror Hjorth in Sweden's national portrait collection in Gripsholm Castle. Romdahl's archive is curated by Gothenburg University Library. He is buried in the North Churchyard, Linköping.
