= Henri de Ziegler =

Swiss university teacher and writer (1885–1970)

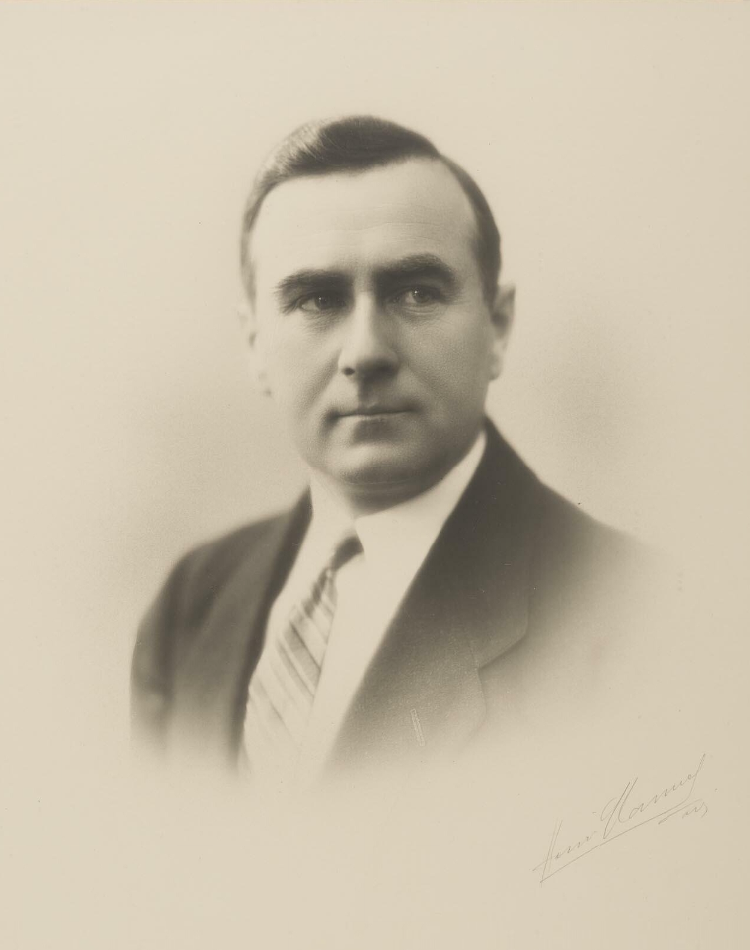
Photograph by Henri Manuel, c. 1920

Henri de Ziegler (18 July 1885 – 21 March 1970) was a Swiss philologist and writer.

== Biography ==
Ziegler was born in Geneva on 18 July 1885, the son of Christophe François de Ziegler, a painter and teacher, and Georgine Frédérica Dufaux. His father's family was originally from Schaffhausen. Ziegler studied literature in Geneva and Vienna, obtaining a doctorate in philosophy. He became professor of Italian literature at the University of Geneva, where he also was rector from 1954 to 1956. Among his most prominent work is a 1935 biography of Frederick II, Holy Roman Emperor. He translated works by Francesco Chiesa and Giuseppe Zoppi into French.

Ziegler was prominent in Geneva's cultural life and a columnist for the Journal de Genève. His literary output includes the poetry collection L'aube (1911), the novels Les deux Romes (1925) and Le bourdon du pèlerin (1931), and numerous writings dedicated to Italy and Portugal. Ziegler died in Geneva on 21 March 1970, aged 84.

== Selected publications ==
- L'aube, 1911
- Les deux Romes, 1925
- Le bourdon du pèlerin, 1931
- Vie de l'empereur Frédéric II de Hohenstaufen, 1935
