= Walter Arthur Berendsohn =

German literary scholar (1884–1984)

Walter Arthur Berendsohn (10 September 1884, in Hamburg – 30 January 1984, in Stockholm) was a German literary scholar. He was an active member of the Deutsche Liga fur Menschenrechte (League for Men's Rights), a spinoff of the pacifist Bund Neues Vaterland, until 1933 when he fled for Sweden when the group was dissolved by Nazis.

== Life ==
Berendsohn was educated at the Friedrich Wilhelm University of Berlin, the University of Freiburg, the Ludwig-Maximilians-Universität München, and Kiel University, in German studies, Scandinavian studies, and philosophy. He obtained his doctorate at Kiel University in 1911 and after completing his habilitation, became a professor at the University of Hamburg, teaching German literature and Scandinavian studies. Besides his academic career, he lectured and officiated at baptisms and weddings for the Hamburg Free Religious Community (freireligiösen Gemeinde) and the German Monist League. He was also a member of the humanist, non-Christian Rising Sun Lodge as well as the Social Democratic Party of Germany.

In 1933, the Nazis seized power and introduced the legislation known as the Berufsbeamtengesetz, which, among other things, dismissed all Jews, including Berendsohn, from their government jobs. Three years later, further persecution by the state stripped Berendsohn of his German citizenship and Aryanized his property. He escaped imminent arrest by immigrating to Denmark, where he was assisted by a stipend from the American Guild for German Cultural Freedom in 1938–40, and again to Sweden during the rescue of the Danish Jews. He was appointed a guest professor at Stockholm University and lived in the city until his death in 1984.

== Work ==
Berendsohn is considered to have founded the study of German Exilliteratur with his seminal book Die humanistische Front (1939). He worked for several decades at the German Studies Institute of Stockholm University, where he, together with the institute's present-day director Prof. Dr. Helmut Müssener, opened the Stockholmer Koordinationsstelle zur Erforschung der deutschsprachigen Exil-Literatur (Stockholm Coordinating Center for Research into Germanophone Exile Literature) in 1969. In 2001, the Hamburger Arbeitsstelle für deutsche Exilliteratur (HafdE) was renamed the Walter-A.-Berendsohn-Forschungsstelle für deutsche Exilliteratur (BFfdE) in his honor. Berendsohn is also well known for writing the biography and championing the work of the writer Nelly Sachs. He successfully nominated Nelly Sachs for the Nobel Literature Prize (1966) and Willy Brandt for the Nobel Peace Prize (1971) .

== Publications ==
- Weltkriegserinnerungen. Prague: Buchdr. Neumann, 1934.
- Knut Hamsun: Das unbändige Ich u. die menschliche Gemeinschaft. Munich: A. Langen, 1929.
- Zur Vorgeschichte des "Beowulf". 1935.
- Humanisme i det 20. Aarhundererde. Kolding, 1937.
- Thomas Mann und die Seinen. Bern, Munich: Francke, 1973. ISBN 3-7720-1054-7.
- August Strindberg: der Mensch und seine Umwelt, das Werk, der schöpferische Künstler. Amsterdam: Rodopi, 1974. (Amsterdamer Publikationen zur Sprache und Literatur; Bd. 4). ISBN 90-6203-061-0.
- August Strindberg. Ein geborener Dramatiker. Munich, 1956.
- Der Meister des politischen Romans, Lion Feuchtwanger. Stockholm: Dt. Inst. d. Univ. Stockholm, 1976. (Schriften des Deutschen Instituts der Universität Stockholm).
- Nelly Sachs: Einf. in das Werk der Dichterin jüdischen Schicksals. Darmstadt: Agora-Verlag. ISBN 3-87008-046-9.
- Innere Emigration. Bromma, 1971.
- Die humanistische Front: Einführung in die deutsche Emigranten-Literatur. Zürich, 1946.
- 153 Autobiographien der Flüchtlinge aus dem Dritten Reich. Bromma, 1966.
