= Nils Ahnlund =

Swedish historian (1889–1957)

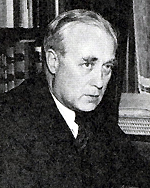
Nils Ahnlund

Nils Ahnlund (23 August 1889 – 11 January 1957) was a Swedish historian. He was professor of history at the then-Stockholm University College 1928–1955, and became a member of the Swedish Academy in 1941. He was the father of physician Hans Olof Ahnlund, literary scientist Knut Ahnlund and the grandfather of journalist and writer Nathan Shachar.

== Biography ==
Nils Ahnlund was born in Uppsala as the eldest son of theologian Olof Ahnlund and Hilda Svensson. In 1893 his father was appointed vicar in Umeå where Nils finished his secondary education. Thereafter he enrolled at Uppsala University, where he quickly became a disciple of Harald Hjärne. His research mainly focused on the time of the Swedish Empire, and his dissertation was on Gustavus Adolphus' diplomatic relations.

Between 1926 and 1926 he worked at Svenska Dagbladet where he had a promising career ahead of him. However, he chose the academic path and became the first professor of history at Stockholm University College in 1928. During World War II, he participated in the public debate, exhibiting nationalist sentiments. In the same period he was a member of the nationalist association Samfundet Nordens Frihet and among the contributors of its magazine, Nordens Frihet.

Ahnlund was a popularizer of history and became widely known for his contributions in newspapers and radio, but in academia he was also successful and became, among other things, a member of the Royal Swedish Academy of Letters, History and Antiquities as early as 1934 and the Swedish Academy. He was also made a member of several Nordic academic societies as well as vice president of the Comité International des Sciences Historiques.

== Publications ==
- Mo och Domsjöverken : deras ägare och utveckling intill 1873. Stockholm: Almqvist & Wicksell. 1917
- Gustaf II Adolf inför tyska kriget. Stockholm: Nya tryckeri-aktiebolaget. 1918
- Storhetstidens gryning : gestalter och händelser. Stockholm: Geber. 1918
- Sundsvalls historia. 1-2. Sundsvall. 1921
- Anmärkningar till handlingar rörande professuren i historia vid Uppsala universitet : sakkunniges utlåtanden och humanistiska sektionens betänkande. Stockholm: Nord. bokh. 1923

Cultural offices
| Preceded by Torsten Fogelqvist | Swedish Academy, Seat No.11; 1941–57 | Succeeded by Eyvind Johnson |
