= 1926 Nobel Prize in Literature =

- Grazia Deledda
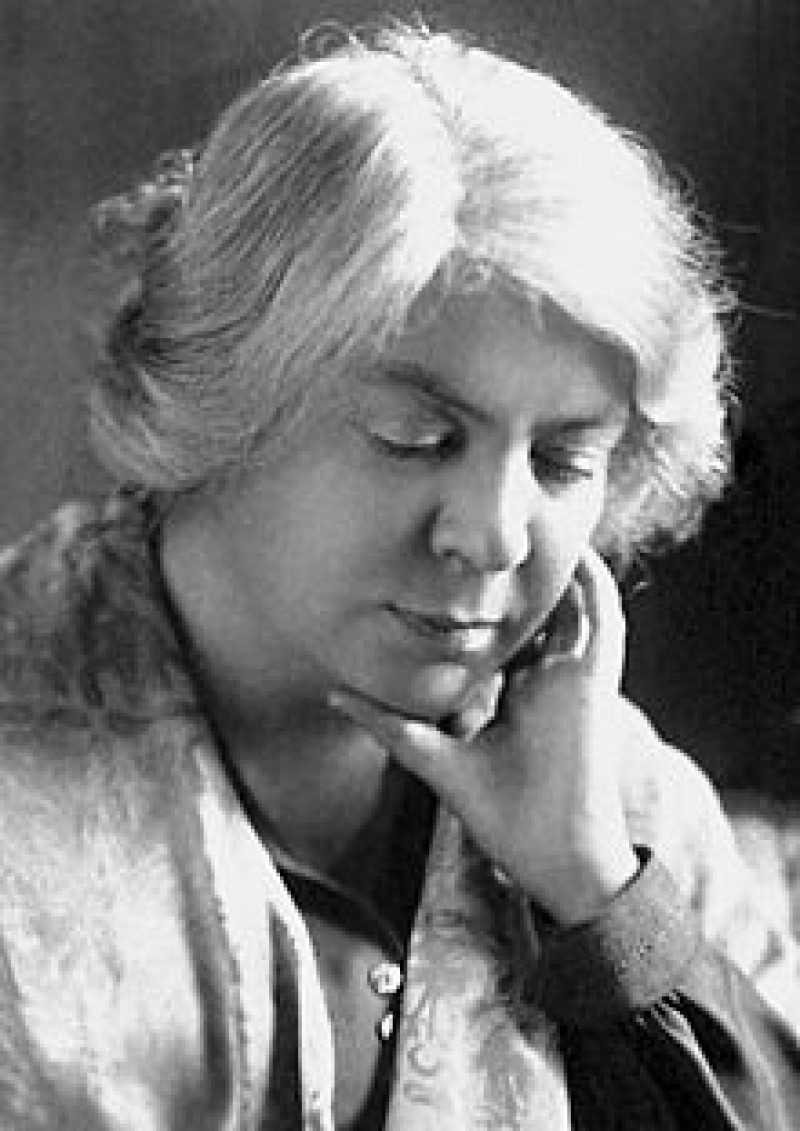
- "for her idealistically inspired writings, which with plastic clarity picture the life on her native island and with depth and sympathy deal with human problems in general."
- Date: 11 November 1926 (Note: The Swedish Academy decided on 11th November 1926 that the 1925 Nobel Prize in Literature should be awarded to George Bernard Shaw and that the current year's Nobel Prize in Literature should be reserved for the following year.) (postponement); 10 November 1927 (announcement); 10 December 1927 (ceremony)
- Location: Stockholm, Sweden
- Presented by: Swedish Academy
- First award: 1901
- Website: Official website

The 1926 Nobel Prize in Literature was awarded to the Italian author Grazia Deledda "for her idealistically inspired writings, which with plastic clarity picture the life on her native island and with depth and sympathy deal with human problems in general." She was the second Italian and second female Nobel laureate in literature.

== Laureate ==
Grazia Deledda wrote a large collection of novels, short stories, articles, stage plays, and poems. After the publication of her first novel Fior de Sardegna ("The Flower of Sardinia") in 1891, which was followed by Elias Portolu in 1900, Deledda gained widespread recognition and praise around the world. Due to the old traditions with deep historical roots that formed Deledda's upbringing and the unfortunate outcomes of her family members, she developed a strong sense of destiny. Her works frequently deal with themes like uncontrollable forces, moral quandaries, passion, and human frailty. Among her oeuvres that earned her prominence in literature include Dopo il divorzio ("After the Divorce", 1902), L'edera ("Ivy", 1908), Canne al vento ("Reeds in the Wind", 1913), and La Fuga in Egitto ("The Flight into Egypt", 1925).

== Deliberations ==
=== Nominations ===
Deledda was not nominated in 1926 but in 1927. She received 18 nominations in total beginning in 1913 with the recommendations of Luigi Luzzatti (1841–1927) and Ferdinando Martini (1840–1928). In 1927, she was nominated by academy member and literary historian Henrik Schück (1855–1947) after which she was eventually awarded.

In total, the Nobel Committee received 37 nominations for 29 authors including George Bernard Shaw (awarded for 1925), Thomas Hardy, Willem Kloos, Rudolf Maria Holzapfel and James George Frazer. Sixteen of the nominees were newly nominated such as Arnold Bennett, Paul Claudel, Avetis Aharonian, Sofía Casanova, Vicente Huidobro, Concha Espina de la Serna (with the highest number of nominations), Edvard Westermarck, Ada Negri, Juan Zorrilla de San Martín, Karl Kraus, J.-H. Rosny aîné, Johannes Jørgensen and Kostis Palamas. Four of the nominees were women: Sigrid Undset (awarded in 1928), Ada Negri, Concha Espina de la Serna, and Sofía Casanova.

The authors Gertrude Bell, René Boylesve, Ada Cambridge, Javier de Viana, Fran Detela, Lyubov Dostoevskaya, Sarah Doudney, Sigrid Elmblad, Ronald Firbank, Dmitry Furmanov, Juan Silvano Godoi, John Burland Harris-Burland, Rose Hawthorne, Ellen Key, Sidney Lee, Helena Nyblom, Karel Václav Rais, Jean Richepin, Rainer Maria Rilke, Albert Robida, Radu Rosetti, August Sedláček, Ågot Gjems Selmer and Carl Nicolai Starcke died in 1926 without having been nominated for the prize.

Official list of nominees and their nominators for the prize
No.	Nominee	Country	Genre(s)	Nominator(s)
1	Avetis Aharonian (1866–1948)	Armenia	essays, short story	Antoine Meillet (1866–1936)
2	Arnold Bennett (1867–1931)	United Kingdom	novel, short story, drama, essays	Gerard De Geer (1858–1943)
3	Georg Bonne (1859–1945)	Germany	essays	Günther Müller (1890–1957)
4	Georg Brandes (1842–1927)	Denmark	literary criticism, essays	Harry Fett (1875–1962)
5	Sofía Casanova (1861–1958)	Spain	novel, short story, essays	Jacinto Benavente (1866–1954); 5 members of the Royal Spanish Academy
6	Paul Claudel (1868–1955)	France	poetry, drama, essays, memoir	René Bazin (1853–1932)
7	Concha Espina de la Serna (1869–1955)	Spain	novel, short story	Georges Cirot (Note: A large number of nominations were made for Concha Espina; those made by nominators who were confirmed as being eligible are enlisted.) (1870–1946); Arturo Farinelli (1867–1948); Ricardo León Román (1877–1943); Jacinto Benavente (1866–1954)
8	James George Frazer (1854–1941)	United Kingdom	history, essays, translation	Martin Persson Nilsson (1874–1967)
9	Paul Ernst (1866–1933)	Germany	novel, short story, drama, essays	Georg Dehio (1850–1932); Ferenc Kováts (1873–1956)
10	Thomas Hardy (1840–1928)	United Kingdom	novel, short story, poetry, drama	Robert Eugen Zachrisson (1880–1937)
11	Ferenc Herczeg (1863–1954)	Hungary	novel, drama, essays	Hungarian Academy of Sciences (Note: This nomination, originally made in 1925, was moved to the nominations for 1926 while the Committee awaits a translation of Herczeg's work, Az élet kapuja.)
12	Rudolf Maria Holzapfel (1874–1930)	Austria	philosophy, essays	Artur Weese (1868–1934)
13	Vicente Huidobro (1893–1948)	Chile	poetry	Enrique Nercasseau Morán (1854–1925)
14	Johannes Vilhelm Jensen (1873–1950)	Denmark	novel, short story, poetry	Frederik Poulsen (1876–1950)
15	Johannes Jørgensen (1866–1956)	Denmark	novel, poetry, biography	Hans Brix (1870–1961); Valdemar Vedel (1865–1942)
16	Hans Ernst Kinck (1865–1926)	Norway	philology, novel, short story, drama, essays	Sten Konow (1867–1948)
17	Willem Kloos (1859–1938)	Netherlands	poetry, essays, literary criticism	Jacob Prinsen (1866–1935)
18	Josip Kosor (1879–1961)	Yugoslavia (Croatia)	novel, poetry, drama	Branislav Petronijević (1875–1954)
19	Pyotr Krasnov (1869–1947)	Soviet Union	essays	Vladimir Andreevich Frantsev (1867–1942)
20	Karl Kraus (1874–1936)	Austria	essays, drama, poetry	Charles Andler (1866–1933); Several French professors
21	Ada Negri (1870–1945)	Italy	poetry, novel, essays	Michele Scherillo (1860–1930)
22	Kostis Palamas (1859–1943)	Greece	poetry, essays	Simos Menardos (1872–1933)
23	Paul Raynal (1885–1971)	France	drama	Tor Hedberg (1862–1931)
24	J.-H. Rosny aîné (1856–1940)	France	novel, short story	Kristoffer Nyrop (1858–1931); Kristian Sandfeld (1873–1942); René Doumic (1860–1937)
25	George Bernard Shaw (1856–1950)	Ireland	drama, essays, novel	Nathan Söderblom (1866–1931); Tor Hedberg (1862–1931)
26	Sigrid Undset (1882–1949)	Norway	novel, memoir, essays	Ulrik Anton Motzfeldt (1807–1865)
27	Hugo von Hofmannsthal (1874–1929)	Austria	novel, poetry, drama, essays	Walther Brecht (1876–1950)
28	Edvard Westermarck (1862–1939)	Finland	philosophy, essays	Gunnar Landtman (1878–1940)
29	Juan Zorrilla de San Martín (1855–1931)	Uruguay	poetry	University of Montevideo (Note: Nominated through the University president and supported by Erik Axel Karlfeldt, member of the Swedish Academy.)

=== Prize decision ===
Deledda received her 1926 award one year later, in 1927. The Swedish Academy announced in November 1926 that no Nobel Prize in Literature would be awarded with the following explanation:

"During the selection process in 1926, the Nobel Committee for Literature decided that none of the year's nominations met the criteria as outlined in the will of Alfred Nobel. According to the Nobel Foundation's statutes, the Nobel Prize can in such a case be reserved until the following year, and this statute was then applied."

The postponed prize for 1925 was awarded to George Bernard Shaw. Certain about a rumour that the Norwegian author Olav Duun was going to be awarded the prize in 1926, the Norwegian newspaper Aftenposten wrongly announced Duun as the winner of the Nobel Prize in Literature on their front page on 11 November 1926 before the Swedish Academy's announcement of Shaw as the winner later that day, which was a publication scandal in Norway. Duun lost out to Shaw with just one vote.
