= Edera =

Edera or L'edera (Italian for '[The] Ivy') may refer to:

== People ==
- Edera Cordiale (married name Gentile; 1920–1993), Italian athlete who competed mainly in the discus
- Maria Edera Spadoni (born 1979), Italian politician
- Ruben Edera Ecleo (1934–1987), Filipino spiritual leader

== Other uses ==
- L'edera (novel), 1906 novel by Grazia Deledda
- L'edera (film), 1950 Italian film based on the novel, also known as Devotion
- "L'edera" (song), 1958 song, remade as "Constantly" by Cliff Richard
- Edera, Basilisa, barangay in the Philippines
- Edera Awyu, a Papuan language
- Edera (TV series), a 1992 Italian television series
