= List of Italian Nobel laureates =

The Nobel Prize has been award to Italians a total of 21 times as of 2021.

Laureates by field
Field	Number of recipients
Physics	6
Chemistry	1
Physiology or Medicine	6
Literature	6
Peace	1
Economic Sciences	1

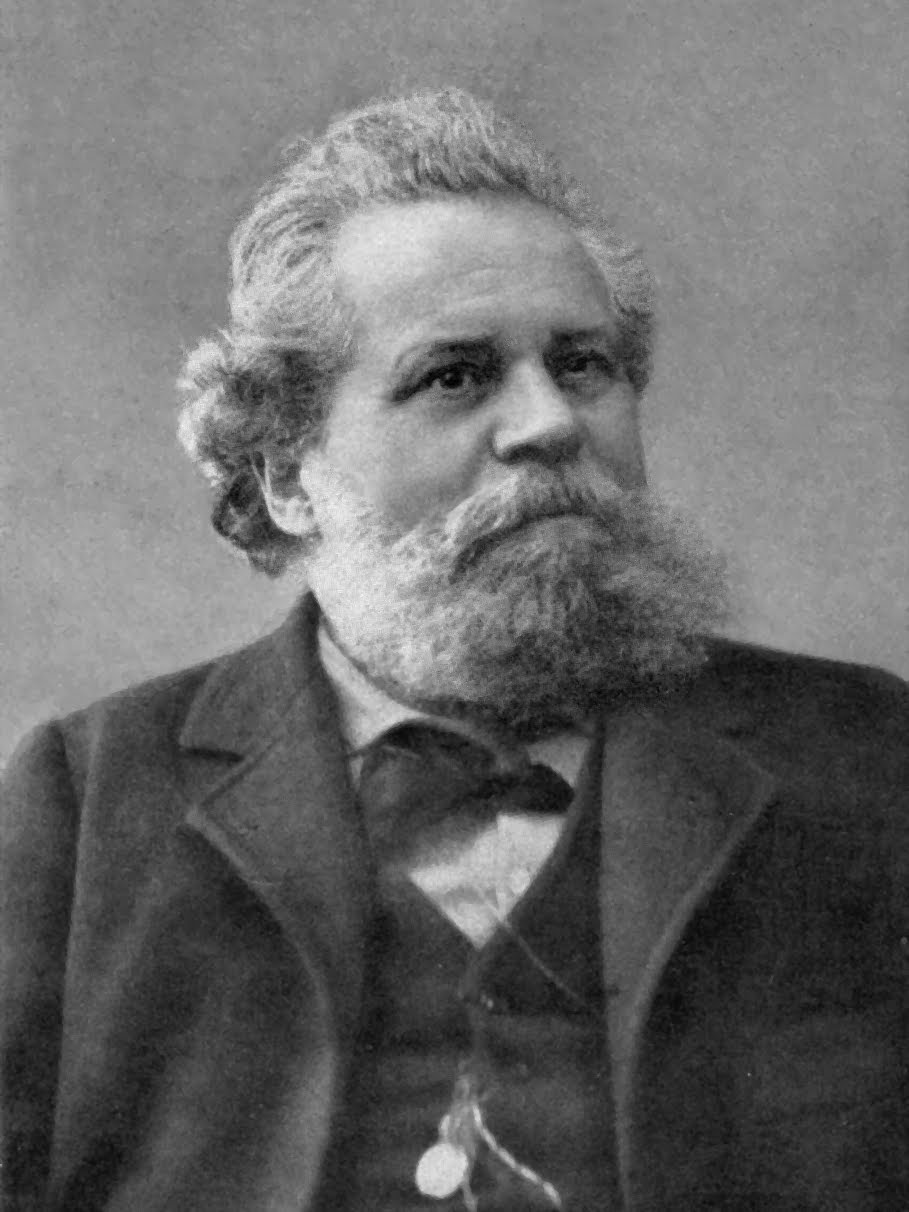
Giosuè Carducci. In 1906, he became the first Italian to receive the Nobel Prize in Literature.

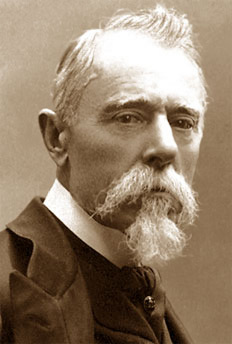
Ernesto Teodoro Moneta was awarded the Nobel Peace Prize in 1907. He adopted the motto In varietate unitas! which later inspired Motto of the European Union.

The Nobel Prize is a set of annual international awards bestowed on "those who conferred the greatest benefit on humankind" in the fields of Physics, Chemistry, Physiology or Medicine, Literature, Peace, and Economic Sciences, (Note: The Sveriges Riksbank Prize in Economic Sciences is an additional prize that was established in 1968 by the Bank of Sweden and was first awarded in 1969. Although not technically a Nobel Prize, it is identified with the award and the winners are announced with the Nobel Prize recipients, and the Prize in Economic Sciences is presented at the Nobel Prize Award Ceremony.) instituted by Alfred Nobel's last will, which specified that a part of his fortune be used to create the prizes. Each laureate (recipient) receives a gold medal, a diploma, and a sum of money, which is decided annually by the Nobel Foundation. They are widely recognized as one of the most prestigious honours awarded in the aforementioned fields.

First instituted in 1901, the Nobel Prize has been awarded to a total of 965 individuals and 27 organizations as of 2023. Among them, 21 Italian nationals have been honored with the Nobel Prize.

The latest Italian laureate is Giorgio Parisi, who received the Nobel Prize in Physics in 2021. Two women received the award: Grazia Deledda in 1926, and Rita Levi-Montalcini in 1986.

== Laureates ==
Swiss Nobel laureates
Year	Image	Laureate	Born	Died	Field	Rationale
1906	Portrait of Camillo Golgi	Camillo Golgi	7 July 1843 in Corteno	21 January 1926 in Pavia	Physiology or Medicine	"in recognition of their work on the structure of the nervous system" prize shared with Santiago Ramón y Cajal
1906	Portrait of Giosuè Carducci	Giosuè Carducci	27 July 1835 in Valdicastello	16 February 1907 in Bologna	Literature	"not only in consideration of his deep learning and critical research, but above all as a tribute to the creative energy, freshness of style, and lyrical force which characterize his poetic masterpieces"
1907	Portrait of Ernesto Teodoro Moneta	Ernesto Teodoro Moneta	20 September 1833 in Milan, Austrian Empire	10 February 1918 in Milan	Peace	"for his work in the press and in peace meetings, both public and private, for an understanding between France and Italy" prize shared with Louis Renault
1909	Portrait of Guglielmo Marconi	Guglielmo Marconi	25 April 1874 in Bologna	20 July 1937 in Rome	Physics	"in recognition of their contributions to the development of wireless telegraphy" prize shared with Karl Ferdinand Braun
1926	Portrait of Grazia Deledda	Grazia Deledda	27 September 1871 in Nuoro	15 August 1936 in Rome	Literature	"for her idealistically inspired writings which with plastic clarity picture the life on her native island and with depth and sympathy deal with human problems in general"
1934	Portrait of Luigi Pirandello	Luigi Pirandello	28 June 1867 in Agrigento	10 December 1936 in Rome	Literature	"for his bold and ingenious revival of dramatic and scenic art"
1938	Portrait of Enrico Fermi	Enrico Fermi	29 September 1901 in Rome since 1944 also American citizen	28 November 1954 in Chicago, USA	Physics	"for his demonstrations of the existence of new radioactive elements produced by neutron irradiation, and for his related discovery of nuclear reactions brought about by slow neutrons"
1957	Portrait of Daniel Bovet	Daniel Bovet	23 March 1907 in Neuchâtel, Switzerland acquired Italian citizenship in 1947 or 1948	8 April 1992 in Rome	Physiology or Medicine	"for his discoveries relating to synthetic compounds that inhibit the action of certain body substances, and especially their action on the vascular system and the skeletal muscles"
1959	Portrait of Emilio Segrè	Emilio Segrè	1 February 1905 in Tivoli since 1944 also American citizen	22 April 1989 in Lafayette, USA	Physics	"for their discovery of the antiproton" prize shared with Owen Chamberlain
1959	Portrait of Salvatore Quasimodo	Salvatore Quasimodo	20 August 1901 in Modica	14 June 1968 in Naples	Literature	"for his lyrical poetry, which with classical fire expresses the tragic experience of life in our own times"
1963	Portrait of Giulio Natta	Giulio Natta	26 February 1903 in Imperia	2 May 1979 in Bergamo	Chemistry	"for their discoveries in the field of the chemistry and technology of high polymers" prize shared with Karl Ziegler
1969	Portrait of Salvador Luria	Salvador Luria	13 August 1912 in Turin since 1947 also American citizen	6 February 1991 in Lexington, USA	Physiology or Medicine	"for their discoveries concerning the replication mechanism and the genetic structure of viruses" prize shared with Max Delbrück and Alfred D. Hershey
1975	Portrait of Renato Dulbecco	Renato Dulbecco	22 February 1914 in Catanzaro since 1953 also American citizen	19 February 2012 in La Jolla, USA	Physiology or Medicine	"for their discoveries concerning the interaction between tumour viruses and the genetic material of the cell" prize shared with David Baltimore and Howard Martin Temin
1975	Portrait of Eugenio Montale	Eugenio Montale	12 October 1896 in Genoa	12 September 1981 in Milan	Literature	"for his distinctive poetry which, with great artistic sensitivity, has interpreted human values under the sign of an outlook on life with no illusions"
1984	Portrait of Carlo Rubbia	Carlo Rubbia	31 March 1934 in Gorizia	—	Physics	"for their decisive contributions to the large project, which led to the discovery of the field particles W and Z, communicators of weak interaction" prize shared with Simon van der Meer
1985	Portrait of Franco Modigliani	Franco Modigliani	18 June 1918 in Rome since 1946 also American citizen	25 September 2003 in Cambridge, USA	Economics	"for his pioneering analyses of saving and of financial markets"
1986	Portrait of Rita Levi-Montalcini	Rita Levi-Montalcini	22 April 1909 in Turin	30 December 2012 in Rome	Physiology or Medicine	"for their discoveries of growth factors" prize shared with Stanley Cohen
1997	Portrait of Dario Fo	Dario Fo	24 March 1926 in Leggiuno-Sangiano	13 October 2016 in Milan	Literature	"who emulates the jesters of the Middle Ages in scourging authority and upholding the dignity of the downtrodden"
2002	Portrait of Riccardo Giacconi	Riccardo Giacconi	6 October 1931 in Genoa since 1960 also American citizen	16 December 2018 in La Jolla	Physics	"for pioneering contributions to astrophysics, which have led to the discovery of cosmic X-ray sources" prize shared with Raymond Davis Jr. and Masatoshi Koshiba
2007	Portrait of Mario Capecchi	Mario Capecchi	6 October 1937 in Verona later naturalized American	—	Physiology or Medicine	"for their discoveries of principles for introducing specific gene modifications in mice by the use of embryonic stem cells" prize shared with Martin J. Evans and Oliver Smithies
2021	Portrait of Giorgio Parisi	Giorgio Parisi	4 August 1948 in Rome	—	Physics	"for the discovery of the interplay of disorder and fluctuations in physical systems from atomic to planetary scales" prize shared with Syukuro Manabe and Klaus Hasselmann

== See also ==
- List of Italians
- List of Nobel laureates by country
