= Belqees TV =

Yemeni news TV channel

Belqees TV قناة بلقيس
- Country: Yemen
- Headquarters: Istanbul, Turkey

Programming
- Language: Arabic

Ownership
- Owner: Tawakkol Karman

History
- Launched: 2014

Links
- Website: belqees.tv belqees.net

Belqees TV (Arabic: قناة بلقيس) was a Yemeni news channel, named after Queen of Sheba and owned by Tawakkol Karman. It was established in 2014 with the help of the Doha Centre for Media Freedom and known for its affiliation to the Muslim Brotherhood. It started broadcasting in the Yemeni capital Sanaa in 2014, but moved to Istanbul after being attacked by the Houthis.

== History ==
Belqees TV established in 2014 and launched its broadcasting in the same year by Yemeni journalist and activist Tawakkol Karman. The news channel was established during a period of increasing political tension, and aimed to provide an independent platform to a country which its media was becoming more polarized or subject to censorship.

Shortly after its foundation, following attacks by the Houthis the channel was forced to move abroad, relocating to Istanbul, Turkey. From there it continued broadcasting for a decade, becoming very popular online. It got over one million subscribers on YouTube and three million followers on Facebook. It streamed live all day and night and showed field reports, talk shows, documentaries, and original drama during Ramadan.

== Termination ==
Belqees TV broadcasts were terminated in late November 2025. This was claimed because of "compelling and uncontrollable circumstances" including financial woes and Turkey's policy shifts on hosting partisan outlets. More severe allegations were made by Morocco who has accused Tawakkol Karman and Belqees TV of encouraging violence, hate, support of terrorism, and insulting Moroccan state institutions. After Morocco filed a legal complaint through the Moroccan Lawyers Club, Turkey treated it as a criminal case, stopped Belqees TV from broadcasting, and shut down its offices in the country.

== See also ==
- Mass media in Yemen
- Tawakkol Karman
- Yemeni Civil War
