= Canne al vento =

1913 novel by Grazia Deledda

- Author: Grazia Deledda
- Original title: Canne al vento
- Language: Italian
- Genre: novel
- Publisher: L'Illustrazione Italiana (serial)
- Publication date: 1913
- Publication place: Italy
- Preceded by: Colombi e sparvieri
- Followed by: Le colpe altrui

Canne al vento ([ˈkanne al ˈvɛnto]; Italian for "Reeds in the wind") is a novel by the Italian author and Nobel Prize winner Grazia Deledda. As with her other works it centres on the theme of "unwise passion".

After being published by episodes on L'Illustrazione Italiana, in the period January 13–27, 1913, it was released as a volume by editor Fratelli Treves in Milan. It is considered the most notable work written by Deledda. The title of the book is an allusion to human frailty and sorrow, which was already found in Elias Portolu, written in 1900: Uomini siamo, Elias, uomini fragili come canne, pensaci bene. Al di sopra di noi c'è una forza che non possiamo vincere. («We are human, Elias, as frail as reeds: think carefully. There's a force we can't defeat above us.»)

An English translation was published in 1999, as Reeds in the Wind, by Martha King.

== About the work ==
Set in the barren lands of Sardinia, the novel involves the themes of poverty, honor and superstition. Early 20th Century rural Sardinia described in the book is still nowadays a combination of an apparently static society, related to millenary customs, and a land striding towards a both industrial and technological progress. Unlike other artists of that time, discussing the most complex side of this progress (that is, how that modernity represented the human essence in every place, not only Western countries), Deledda was much more sensitive and concerned about its cultural side, grasping the deep and upsetting meaning of this change. We can see this in her projection of the island community.

It is not a story for its own sake, neither is it enclosed within the Sardinian borders. What was valid for the island was also for Italy at the time, and the world.

== Plot ==
A Sardinian village called Galte, not far from the mouth of the Cedrino river (on the Tyrrhenian coast), is home to the noble family Pintor (a father and a mother with four daughters); Don Zame, the head of the family, is described as red and violent as the devil: he's a proud and arrogant man, jealous of the house's honor in the village. His wife and daughters, devoted to housework, are never allowed to go out. The only rebel to their condition is Lia, Don Zame's third child, who flees to the Italian Peninsula against her father's rule, reaching Civitavecchia. There, she gets married and has a son, but unfortunately she dies. Don Zame appears to go mad for the scandal. "A shade of death encumbered the house: no comparable scandal had ever risen before; it had never happened that such a noble and polite maiden like Lia had run away like that". Eventually, her father is mysteriously found dead on the bridge at the entrance of the village. Was it a misfortune or a murder? The above events are the background to the story, revealed throughout the novel from the point in which Giacinto, Lia's son, comes to the Pintor house.

The narration begins years later, when the no longer young Pintor ladies (Ruth, Ester and Noemi) live in a by then crumbling house and are still the owners of a small estate, barely sufficient to their maintenance. Their existences pass in a mournful sadness that is overthrowing their pride and amour propre, sometimes seen in Noemi's behavior but very seldom in her elder sisters', who are worn out because of misery. Their servant Efix (from Ephysius, the name of the patron saint of Cagliari) is attached to them by a strong guilt trip (in effect, he had killed Don Zame to help Lia, for whom he had a feeling really similar to love). He dreams one day the house of Pintor will flourish again. His hope is kindled by the arrival of Giacinto, which arouses very different emotions among the people of the village. Finally love establishes a new balance of things.

== In popular culture ==
In 1958, a TV series was produced by RAI for Italian broadcast.
