= Tawakkol Karman =

Yemeni-Turkish journalist, politician and human rights activist (born 1979)

- توكل كرمان
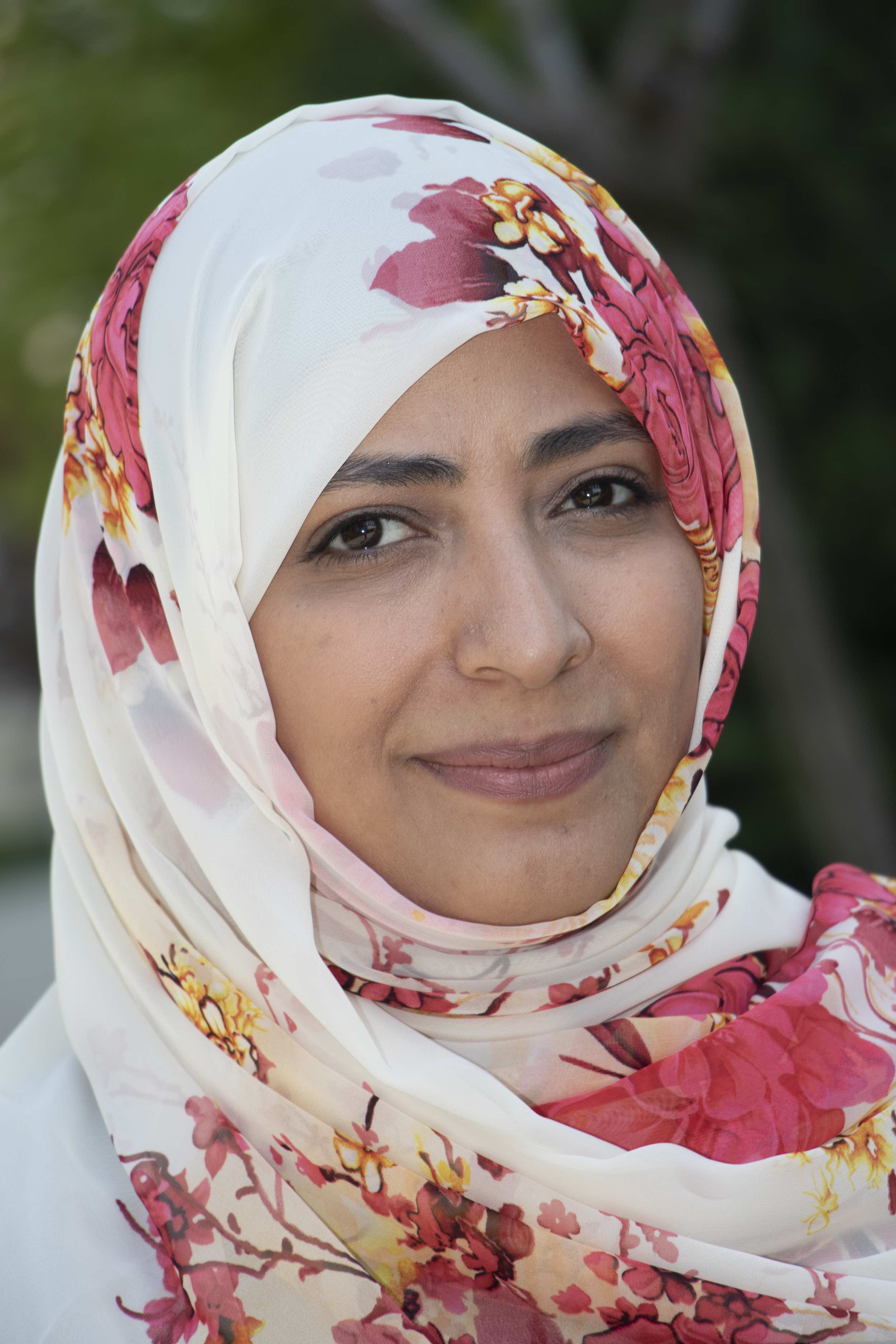
- Karman in 2012
- Born: 7 February 1979 (age 47); Taiz Governorate, Yemen Arab Republic
- Citizenship: Yemeni; Turkish
- Education: University of Massachusetts Lowell; Sanaa University
- Occupations: Journalist; Politician; Human rights activist Revolutionary
- Movement: Jasmine Revolution
- Spouse: Mohammed Al-Nehmi
- Children: 4
- Parent(s): Abdulsalam Khaled Karman (Father); Anisah Hussein Abdullah Al Aswadi (Mother)
- Relatives: Eshraq Karman (sister); Entesar Karman (sister); Mohameed Karman (brother); Khaled Karman (brother); Hakimah Karman (sister); Tariq Karman (brother); Khadejah Karman (sister); Huda Karman (sister); Safa Karman (sister)
- Awards: Nobel Peace Prize (2011)
- Website: Tawakkol Karman's personal website Tawakkol Karman Foundation

Karman in Stockholm 2014.

Tawakkol Abdel-Salam Khalid Karman (Arabic: توكل عبد السلام خالد كرمان, romanized: Tawakkul 'Abd us-Salām Khālid Karmān; Turkish: Tevekkül Karman; born 7 February 1979) is a Yemeni journalist, politician, and human rights activist. She co-founded and leads 'Women Journalists Without Chains', a group established in 2005 to advocate for press freedom and human rights. She became the international public face of the 2011 Yemeni uprising that was part of the Arab Spring movement. She was often referred as the 'Iron Woman' and the 'Mother of the Revolution" in Yemen. She is a co-recipient of the 2011 Nobel Peace Prize for "non-violent struggle for the safety of women and for women's rights to full participation in peace-building work". She became the first Yemeni, the first Arab woman, and the second Muslim woman to win a Nobel Prize.

Karman gained prominence in Yemen after 2005 as a Yemeni journalist and an advocate for press freedom, particularly following the denial of a license for a mobile phone news service in 2007, after which she led protests. After May 2007, she organized weekly protests advocating for broader reforms in Yemen. In early 2011, she shifted the protests to align with the broader Arab Spring movement, inspired by the Tunisian revolution that overthrew the government of Zine El Abidine Ben Ali. She was a vocal opponent who called for the end of President Ali Abdullah Saleh's government.

== Personal life ==
Tawakkol Karman was born on 7 February 1979 in Shara'b As Salam, Taiz Governorate, then North Yemen. She grew up near Taiz, the country's second largest city, known for its educational institutions in an otherwise conservative environment. Karman studied in Taiz. Her father, Abdel Salam Karman, is a lawyer and politician who served as the Legal Affairs Minister in Ali Abdullah Saleh's government before resigning. She has two siblings: Tariq Karman, a poet, and Safa Karman, a lawyer and the first Yemeni to graduate from Harvard Law School. Safa also works as a journalist for Al-Jazeera. Tawakkol is married to Mohammed al-Nahmi and is the mother of three children.

Karman holds a master's degree in international security from the University of Massachusetts Lowell, an undergraduate degree in commerce from the University of Science and Technology, and a graduate degree in political science from the University of Sana'a. In 2012, she received an Honorary Doctorate in International Law from the University of Alberta in Canada.

During a protest in 2010, a woman attempted to stab Karman with a jambiya, but her supporters intervened and prevented the attack. According to her brother Tariq Karman, she also received a death threat from "a senior Yemeni official" on 26 January 2011, warning her to stop her public protests. Journalist Dexter Filkins later identified this official as President Ali Abdullah Saleh in The New Yorker. The Turkish government offered her Turkish citizenship, which she received from the Turkish foreign minister on 11 October 2012, tracing her family origin to Karaman Province in Central Anatolia.

In 2012, Karman participated as a panelist in the annual Clinton Global Initiative session titled "Champions of Action". In 2019, she was honored as the Social Entrepreneur of the Year at The Asian Awards. Like many Yemenis, Karman was forced to leave Yemen after the Houthi takeover of the capital, Sana'a, due to the worsening security situation. From her new home in Istanbul, she continues to speak out against injustices in Yemen, including the war waged by the Saudi-UAE-led coalition and U.S. drone attacks. On 17 December 2020, Karman reported that Houthi rebels raided her home and office, taking control of both locations after looting them.

== Women Journalists Without Chains ==
Tawakkol Karman co-founded the human rights group Women Journalists Without Chains (WJWC) with seven other female journalists in 2005 in order to promote human rights, "particularly freedom of opinion and expression, and democratic rights." Although it was founded as "Female Reporters Without Borders," the present name was adopted in order to get a government license. Karman has said she has received "threats and temptations" and was the target of harassment from the Yemeni authorities by telephone and letter because of her refusal to accept the Ministry of Information's rejection of WJWC's application to legally create a newspaper and a radio station. The group advocated freedom for SMS news services, which had been tightly controlled by the government despite not falling under the purview of the Press Law of 1990. After a governmental review of the text services, the only service that was not granted a license to continue was Bilakoyood, which belonged to WJWC and had operated for a year. In 2007, WJWC released a report that documented Yemeni abuses of press freedom since 2005. In 2009, she criticised the ministry of information for establishing trials that targeted journalists. From 2007 to 2010, Karman regularly led demonstrations and sit-ins in Tahrir Square, Sana'a.

Tawakkol Karman was affiliated with the Al-Thawrah newspaper at the time she founded WJWC in March 2005. She is also a member of the Yemeni Journalists' Syndicate. In 2019, Tawakkol called for a treaty to end violence against women, in support of Every Woman Coalition.

== Political positions ==
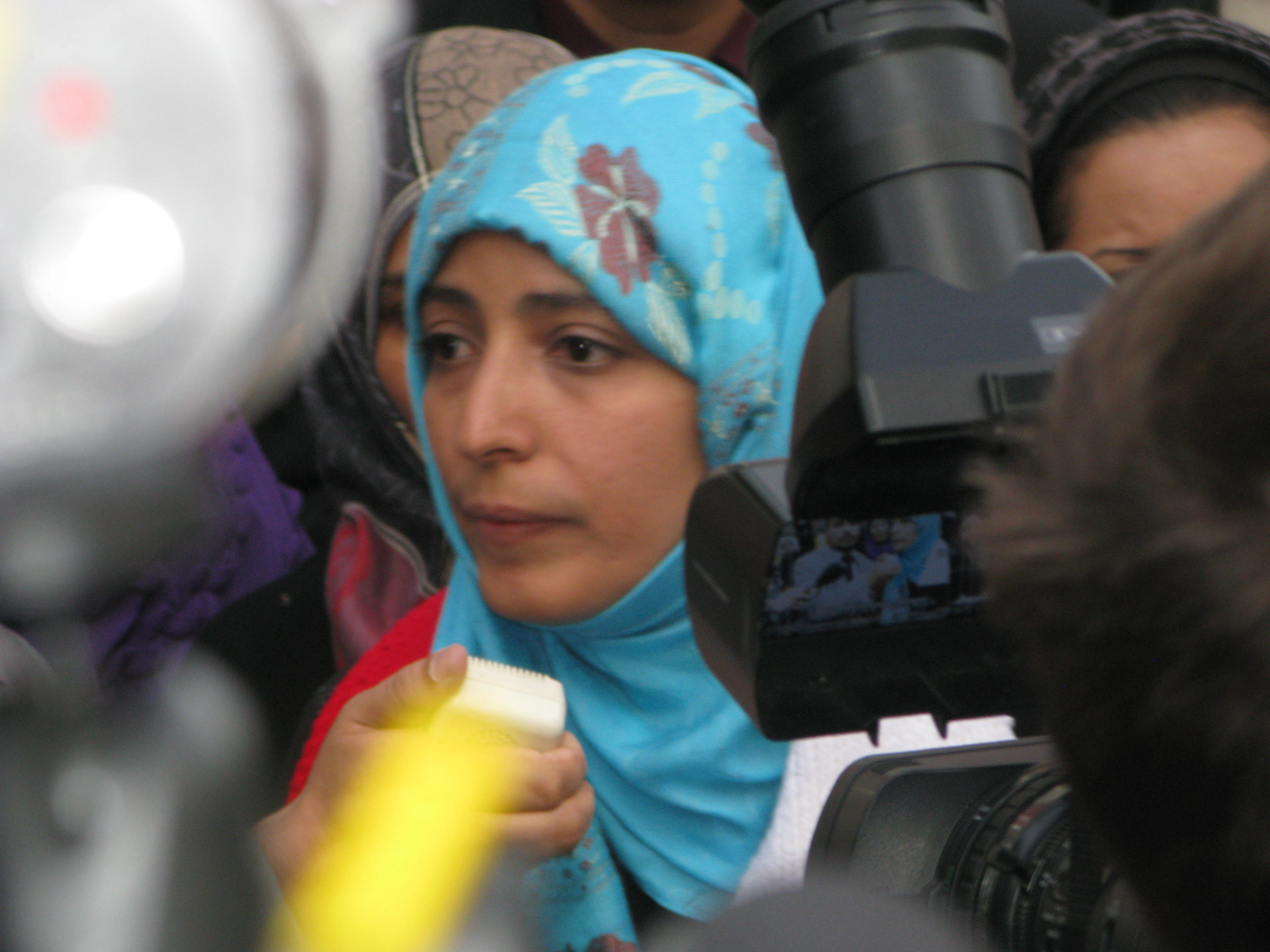
Tawakkol Karman protests outside the UN building, 18 October 2011.

Karman started protests as an advocate for press freedoms in her country. At a time when she was advocating for more press freedom, she responded to the Jyllands-Posten Muhammad cartoons controversy in 2005 by writing: "We are not to call for tyranny and bans on freedom." She was a senior member of the Al-Islah party, although she was suspended from the party in 2018 after she accused the Saudi-led coalition of acting as occupiers in the country.

She stopped wearing the traditional niqab in favour of more colourful hijabs that showed her face. She first appeared without the niqab at a conference in 2004. Karman replaced the niqab for the scarf in public on national television to make her point that the full covering is cultural and not dictated by Islam. She told the Yemen Times in 2010 that:

Women should stop being or feeling that they are part of the problem and become part of the solution. We have been marginalized for a long time, and now is the time for women to stand up and become active without needing to ask for permission or acceptance. This is the only way we will give back to our society and allow for Yemen to reach the great potentials it has.

She has alleged that many Yemeni girls suffer from malnutrition so that boys could be fed and also called attention to high illiteracy rates: two-thirds of Yemeni women are unable to read. Advocating for laws that would prevent females younger than 17 from being married, in a statement made to Human Rights Watch, a human rights research and advocacy group, she stated that Yemen's revolution "didn't happen just to solve political problems, but also to address societal problems, the most important being child marriage." Despite most members of her party holding a different view on child marriage than her, she claims her party is the most open to women. In clarifying her position, she said:

Our party needs the youth but the youth also need the parties to help them organise. Neither will succeed in overthrowing this regime without the other. We don't want the international community to label our revolution an Islamic one.

She has also led protests against government corruption. Her stand on the ouster of Saleh became stronger after village lands of families around the city of Ibb were appropriated by a corrupt local leader. Likewise, she says she remains independent from foreign influences: "I do have close strategic ties with American organizations involved in protecting human rights, with American ambassadors and with officials in the U.S. State Department. (I also have ties with activists in) most of the E.U. and Arab countries. But they are ties among equals; (I am not) their subordinate." Speaking before an audience at the University of Michigan, Karman summed up her belief: "I am a citizen of the world. The Earth is my country, and humanity is my nation."

She expressed support for the Palestinian people in the Israeli–Palestinian conflict. In May 2024, Karman stated, "The world is silent in front of the genocide and the ethnic cleansing of the Palestinian people in Gaza."

=== Egyptian conflict ===
As a response to the 2012–13 Egyptian protests and the 2013 Egyptian coup d'état, Karman was supportive of protests demanding Egyptian president Mohamed Morsi's resignation on 30 June, but was later critical of the military's decisions on July 3 to oust Morsi, suspend the Constitution and bar the Muslim Brotherhood from participating in Egyptian politics, citing that Morsi was Egypt's first democratically elected leader, the constitution was supported by 60% of people who voted in a public referendum and that the coup may cause people to lose faith in democracy, allowing extremist groups to thrive. She attempted to enter Egypt to join protests against the coup but was banned from doing so by the Egyptian military for "security reasons" and was deported back to Sana'a. She later denounced the military's arrests of high-ranking Muslim Brotherhood officials and the military's use of violence on protesters at sites occupied primarily by Morsi's supporters.

=== Yemeni conflict ===
Karman routinely speaks out against both the Houthi insurgency and Al-Qaeda in the Arabian Peninsula, calling both of them threats to Yemen's national sovereignty. She has condemned the groups for what she says are their efforts to destabilize the country and overthrow the Yemeni government. She has accused the Houthis of receiving foreign aid from the Iranian government and objects to what she believes are foreign efforts to leave the Houthis alone since they are also fighting against Al-Qaeda. After the announcement of Houthi integration into the Yemeni military, Karman stated that there shouldn't be integration if the Houthis are unwilling to surrender their weapons. As a response to the January 2015 events of the 2014–15 Yemeni coup d'état, she spoke out on what she believes is collaboration between former president Saleh and the Houthi rebels to undo the 2011 revolution by ending the transition process. Despite the civil war, Karman remains optimistic for her country's future. "It's very sad, all this killing, all this war," Karman said in an interview with the Journal of Middle Eastern Politics and Policy in 2016. "But at the same time, we don't lose our hope, and we don't lose our vision, and we don't lose our dream."

Karman often objects to U.S. drone policy in Yemen, calling the use of them "unacceptable" and has argued that using them in populated areas violates human rights and international laws. Following an increase in the number of drone strikes in August 2013, she called for an immediate halt of all strikes, proclaiming that the bombings undermine Yemen's sovereignty and contribute to increases in Al-Qaeda recruits in the country.

Karman condemned the Saudi-led intervention in Yemen, stating: "Unfortunately, this coalition deals with this war just as a battle to fire bombs and throw missiles, ignoring the consequences." She called for an "immediate cessation" of air strikes by the coalition.

== 2011 protests ==
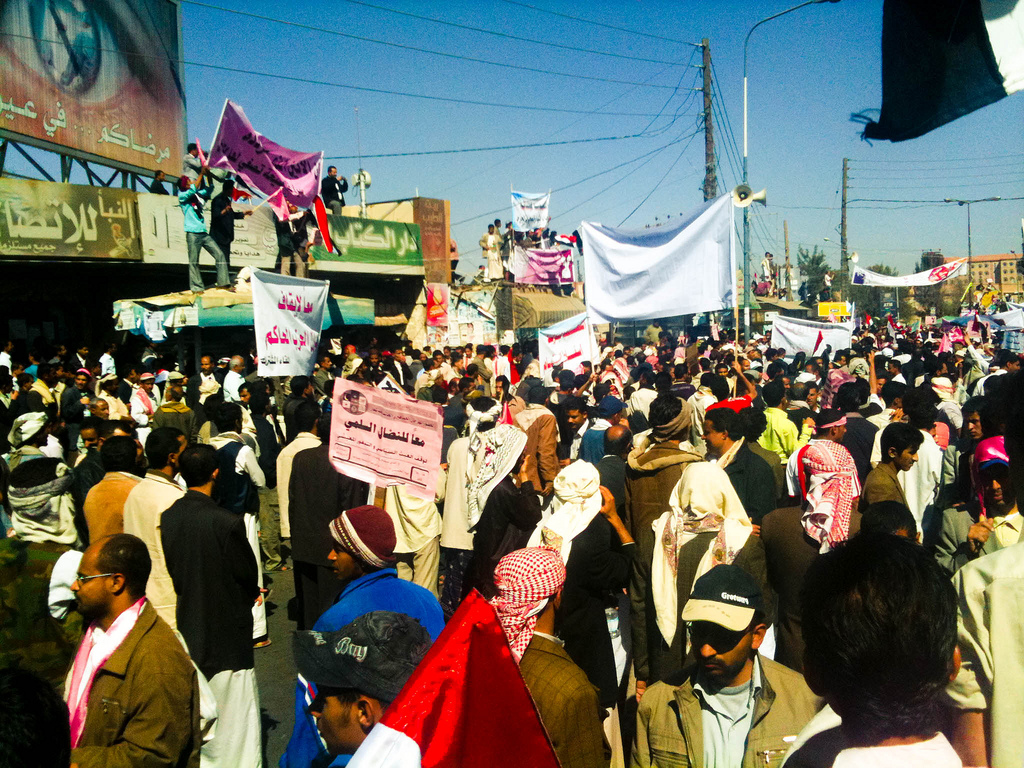
Protest on the "Day of Rage" that Karman had called for in Sana'a, Yemen, from 3 February 2011.

During the 2011 Yemeni protests, Tawakkol Karman organised student rallies in Sana'a in protest against the long-standing rule of Saleh's government. On 22 January, she was stopped while driving with her husband by three plain-clothed men without police identification and taken to prison, where she was held for 36 hours until she was released on parole on 24 January. In a 9 April editorial that appeared in The Guardian, she wrote:

After a week of protests I was detained by the security forces in the middle of the night. This was to become a defining moment in the Yemeni revolution: media outlets reported my detention and demonstrations erupted in most provinces of the country; they were organised by students, civil society activists and politicians. The pressure on the government was intense, and I was released after 36 hours in a women's prison, where I was kept in chains.

She then led another protest on 29 January where she called for a "Day of Rage" on 3 February similar to events of the 2011 Egyptian revolution that were in turn inspired by the 2010–2011 Tunisian revolution. On 17 March, she was re-arrested amidst ongoing protests. Speaking of the uprising she had said that: "We will continue until the fall of Ali Abdullah Saleh's regime...We have the Southern Movement in the south, the (Shia) Huthi rebels in the north, and parliamentary opposition...But what's most important now is the jasmine revolution." She has set at the protest camp for months along with her husband.

Karman explained the reasons why the Yemeni protests attracted Yemenis: "The combination of a dictatorship, corruption, poverty and unemployment has created this revolution. It's like a volcano. Injustice and corruption are exploding while opportunities for a good life are coming to an end."

Karman has had some tense disagreements with other organisers, especially after she urged protesters to march to the Presidential Palace in May as a response to the killing of 13 protesters by security forces.

On 18 June she wrote an article entitled "Yemen's Unfinished Revolution" in The New York Times in which she criticised the United States and Saudi Arabia for their support for the "corrupt" Saleh government because they "used their influence to ensure that members of the old regime remain in power and the status quo is maintained." She argued that American intervention in Yemen was motivated by the war on terror and was not responsive to either the human rights abuses in Yemen or the calls from Yemen's democracy movement. She affirmed that the protesters in Yemen also wanted stability in the country and region. In an interview on Democracy Now!, Karman said, "In our weekly protests in front of the cabinet, we called on the government to allow people to have freedom of speech and for people to be able to own online newspapers. We knew and know that freedom of speech is the door to democracy and justice, and also that part of the freedom of speech is the freedom of movement... The culture of freedom and protests spread all over Yemen. Every time we stood up for our rights the government answered with violence or interfered in our rights...." She credited Tunisia for inspiring others around the Middle East for the Arab Spring protests.

On 16 October, government snipers in Taiz shot and killed Aziza Othman Kaleb. CNN stated that she was the first woman to have been killed during the Yemen protests. The Hindu estimated that 30 percent of the protestors in protests in Freedom Square in Taiz were women. Ten days after Kaleb was shot, women in Sana'a protested against the violent force used against them by burning their makrama. At the time, Karman was in Washington, D.C., where she said the female protesters who burned their makrama were "reject(ing) the injustice that the Saleh regime has imposed on them. And this is a new stage for the Yemeni women, because they will not hide behind veils or behind walls or anything else."

=== Involvement of international government organizations ===
After the Nobel Peace Prize announcement, Tawakkol Karman became increasingly involved in mobilizing world opinion and United Nations Security Council members to assist the protesters in ousting Saleh and bringing him before the international court.

She lobbied the United Nations Security Council and the United States not to make a deal that would pardon Saleh, but instead hold him accountable, freeze his assets and support the protesters. The United Nations Security Council voted 15–0 on 21 October on United Nations Security Council Resolution 2014 that "strongly condemns" Saleh's government for the use of deadly force against protesters, but it also backed the Gulf Cooperation Council's (GCC) initiative that would give Saleh immunity from prosecution should he resign. Karman, who was present for the vote, criticised the council's support for the GCC's proposal and instead advocated that Saleh stand trial at the International Criminal Court.

Karman also met the United States' Secretary of State Hillary Clinton on 28 October to discuss the same United Nations Resolution, to which Clinton said "the United States supports a democratic transition in Yemen and the rights of the people of Yemen – men and women – to choose their own leaders and futures." Karman responded to the comment through the Yemini press by saying, "in Yemen, it has been nine months that people have been camped in the squares. Until now we didn't see that Obama came to value the sacrifice of the Yemeni people. Instead the American administration is giving guarantees to Saleh."

Saleh signed the Gulf Cooperation Council's plan 23 November 2011 in Riyadh, Saudi Arabia. Saleh would transfer his powers to Vice President Abd al-Rab Mansur al-Hadi to start a political transition, according to the terms of the agreement.

== 2011 Nobel Peace Prize ==
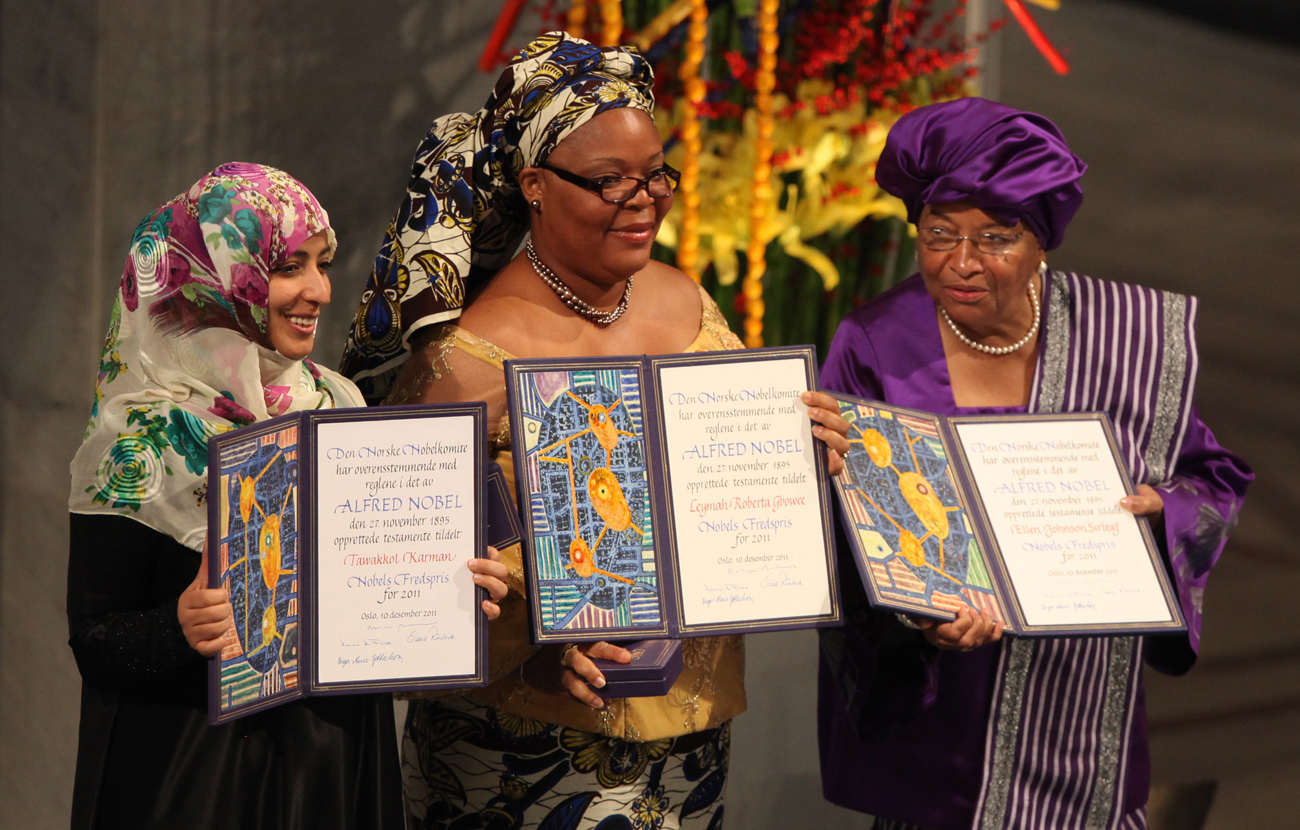
From left to right: Tawakkul Karman, Leymah Gbowee, and Ellen Johnson Sirleaf display their awards during the presentation of the Nobel Peace Prize, 10 December 2011.

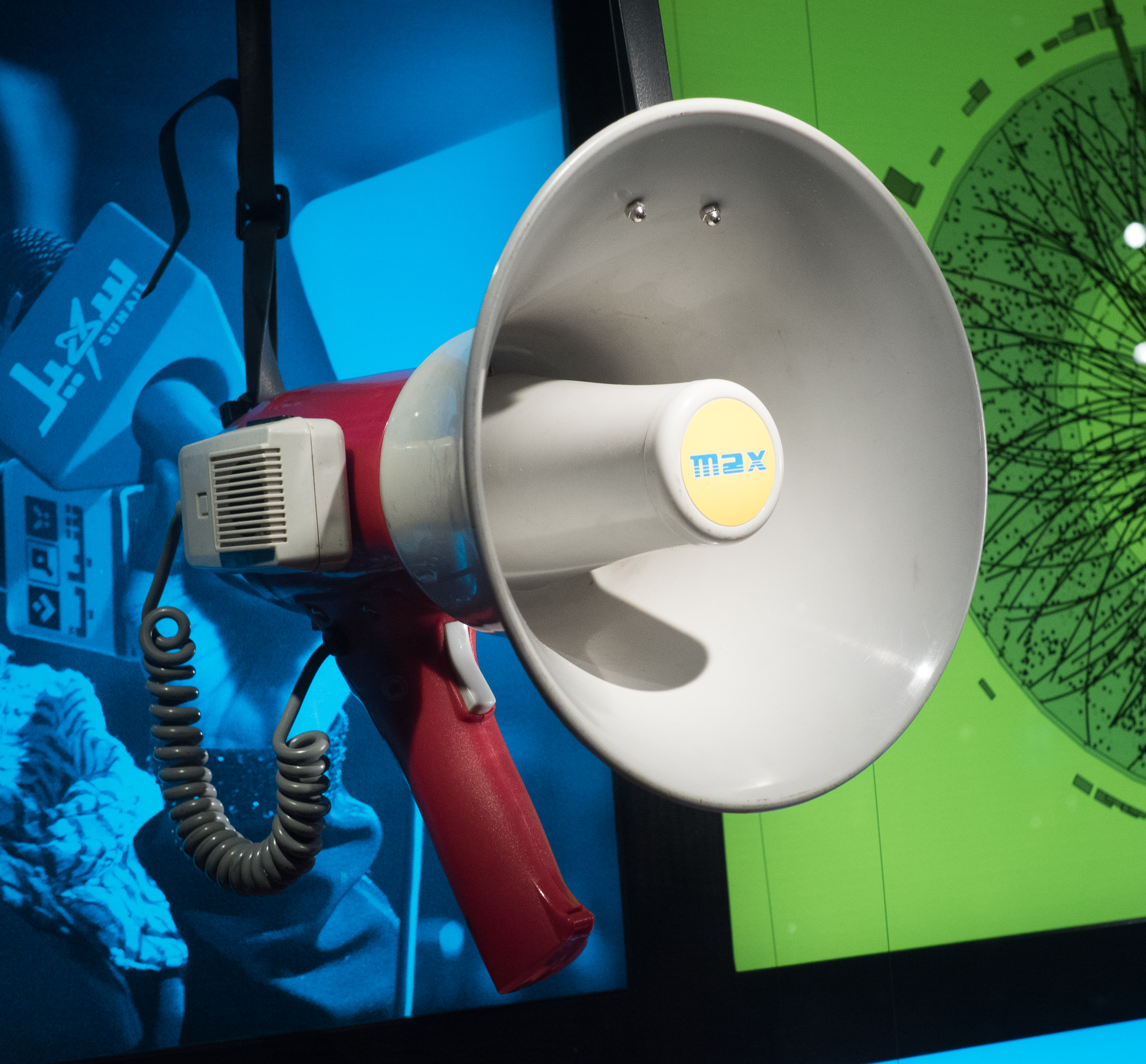
Karman's megaphone on display at the Nobel Prize Museum

Karman, along with Ellen Johnson Sirleaf and Leymah Gbowee, were the co-recipients of the 2011 Nobel Peace Prize "for their non-violent struggle for the safety of women and for women's rights to full participation in peace-building work." Of Karman, the Nobel Committee said: "In the most trying circumstances, both before and during the 'Arab spring', Tawakkul Karman has played a leading part in the struggle for women's rights and for democracy and peace in Yemen." The Nobel Committee cited the United Nations Security Council Resolution 1325, adopted in 2000, which states that women and children suffer great harm from war and political instability and that women must have a larger influence and role in peacemaking activities; it also "[c]alls on all actors involved, when negotiating and implementing peace agreements, to adopt a gender perspective."

Karman was the first Arab woman, the youngest person at that time to have become a Nobel Peace Laureate, and the category's second Muslim woman.

Upon announcing the award, the committee chairman Thorbjørn Jagland said: "We cannot achieve democracy and lasting peace in the world unless women obtain the same opportunities as men to influence developments at all levels of society." He later added that the prize was "a very important signal to women all over the world" and that, despite the events of the Arab Spring, "there are many other positive developments in the world that we have looked at. I think it is a little strange that researchers and others have not seen them." He had earlier said the prize for the year would be "very powerful... but at the same time very unifying [and would] not create as strong reactions from a single country as it did last year [with Liu Xiaobo]." The 2011 prize is to be divided equally among the three recipients, from a total of 10 million Swedish kronor.

In reaction to the award Karman, while camped out in Sana'a during ongoing anti-government protests, said: "I didn't expect it. It came as a total surprise. This is a victory for Arabs around the world and a victory for Arab women" and that the award was a "victory of our peaceful revolution. I am so happy, and I give this award to all of the youth and all of the women across the Arab world, in Egypt, in Tunisia. We cannot build our country or any country in the world without peace," adding that it was also for "Libya, Syria and Yemen and all the youth and women, this is a victory for our demand for citizenship and human rights," that "all Yemenis [are] happy over the prize. The fight for democratic Yemen will continue," that she "dedicate[s] it to all the martyrs and wounded of the Arab Spring… in Tunisia, Egypt, Yemen, Libya and Syria and to all the free people who are fighting for their rights and freedoms" and "I dedicate it to all Yemenis who preferred to make their revolution peaceful by facing the snipers with flowers. It is for the Yemeni women, for the peaceful protesters in Tunisia, Egypt, and all the Arab world." She also said she had not known about the nomination and had found out about the award via television.

=== Post-Nobel Prize ===
The solution to women's issues can only be achieved in a free and democratic society in which human energy is liberated, the energy of both women and men together. Our civilization is called human civilization and is not attributed only to men or women.

— Tawakkol Karman

After the announcement, Karman traveled to Qatar where she met with Sheikh Tamim bin Hamad Al Thani and also requested the Doha Centre for Media Freedom's assistance to set up a television and radio station, which would be named Belqees TV, in honour of the Queen of Sheba, in order to support female journalists and to broadly educate Yemeni journalists. She is on the International Advisory Board of the MBI Al Jaber Media Institute in Yemen which offers free training in all aspects of journalism.

She also made a video message in Washington, D.C., on 25 October on the occasion of the release of the 14th annual report of the Observatory for the Protection of Human Rights Defenders (OBS) by the International Federation of Human Rights (FIDH) and the World Organisation Against Torture (OMCT). The report included information about the Arab Spring, Yemen, and Karman.

She was selected as the first place of the Foreign Policy top 100 global thinkers of 2011.

She has given scholarships to promising students from Yemen to study at Istanbul Aydın University at undergraduate and postgraduate level, in conjunction with the MBI Al Jaber Foundation.

Karman has spoken at colleges and universities across the globe. She spoke at Elizabethtown College and discussed women, human rights and the Arab Revolution.

Regarding the Yemeni Civil War (2015–present), she blames the Houthis for the conflict.

In 2019, Time created 89 new covers to celebrate women of the year starting from 1920; it chose her for 2011.

=== Cybervictim ===
In 2019, it was revealed that Karman had been targeted by Project Raven; a UAE clandestine surveillance and cybercrime, targeting other governments, militants and human rights activists critical of the UAE monarchy. Using a "sophisticated spying tool called Karma" they managed to gain illegal access to an iPhone belonging to Karman.

== Documentary ==
Yemeni filmmaker Khadija al-Salami highlighted the role that women played in the Yemen uprising in her 2012 documentary film The Scream, in which Tawakkol Karman is interviewed. Al-Salami presents three individual portraits - a journalist, an activist, and a poet - in the documentary. The title refers to women who are vocal about their position relative to men in reaction to a traditional patriarchal society. The Scream had its debut screening at the Dubai International Film Festival in 2012.

== Writings ==
- "Burning Embassys is Not the Way." Yemen Times, 19 February 2006.
- "Our revolution's doing what Saleh can't – uniting Yemen." The Guardian, 9 April 2011.
- "Yemen’s unfinished revolution." New York Times, 18 June 2011.
- "The world must not forsake Yemen's struggle for freedom." The Guardian, 1 November 2011. (Includes a link to the Arabic version.)
- "Tawakkol Karman – Nobel Lecture." Nobelprize.org. 10 December 2011. (Includes links to the English, Norwegian, and Arabic versions.)
- "In the absence of a free press, there is no democracy." World Association of Newspapers and News Publishers (WAN-IFRA), 3 May 2012.
- "Egypt's coup has crushed all the freedoms won in the revolution." The Guardian, 8 August 2013.
- "Morsy Is the Arab World's Mandela." Foreign Policy, 9 August 2013.
- "Empowering Competency: Working Toward a Just and Effective Development." Impakter, 20 March 2017.

== Facebook Oversight Board ==
On 6 May 2020, Facebook appointed her to its oversight board. Following her appointment, she was subjected to Saudi Arabian harassment in its media. In response, she stated that she hoped that she would not end up like Jamal Khashoggi.

== Philanthropy ==
On 13 February 2023, Tawakkol Karman together with Turkish Disaster and Emergency Management Presidency (AFAD) built 50 temporary shelters for the brutal 6 February 2023 Turkey-Syria earthquake victims and her foundation also sent relief convoys to earthquake-raged areas in Turkey and Syria.

== Belqees TV ==
Belqees TV was the news channel established in 2014 with the help of the Doha Centre for Media Freedom and known for its affiliation to the Muslim Brotherhood and owned by Tawakkol Karman. She established it in 2014 in Saana, Yemen, but was forced to move to Istanbul, Turkey in 2015, due to the Houthi takeover in Yemen. In the passing decade it got over one million subscribers on YouTube and three million followers on Facebook. It streamed live all day and night and showed field reports, talk shows, documentaries, and original drama during Ramadan. In Late November the channel was shut down following the allegations by Morocco, that accused Tawakkol Karman and Belqees TV of encouraging violence, hate, and support for terrorism, and of insulting Moroccan state institutions. These claims are based on things she allegedly said and posted online during protests in Morocco. After Morocco filed a legal complaint through the Moroccan Lawyers Club, Turkey treated it as a criminal case, stopped Belqees TV from broadcasting, and shut down its offices there.

== See also ==
- List of Nobel Peace Laureates
- List of female Nobel laureates
- List of peace activists

Awards and achievements
Preceded by Liu Xiaobo	Laureate of the Nobel Peace Prize; 2011; With: Leymah Gbowee and Ellen Johnson Sirleaf	Succeeded by European Union
