= List of women Nobel laureates =

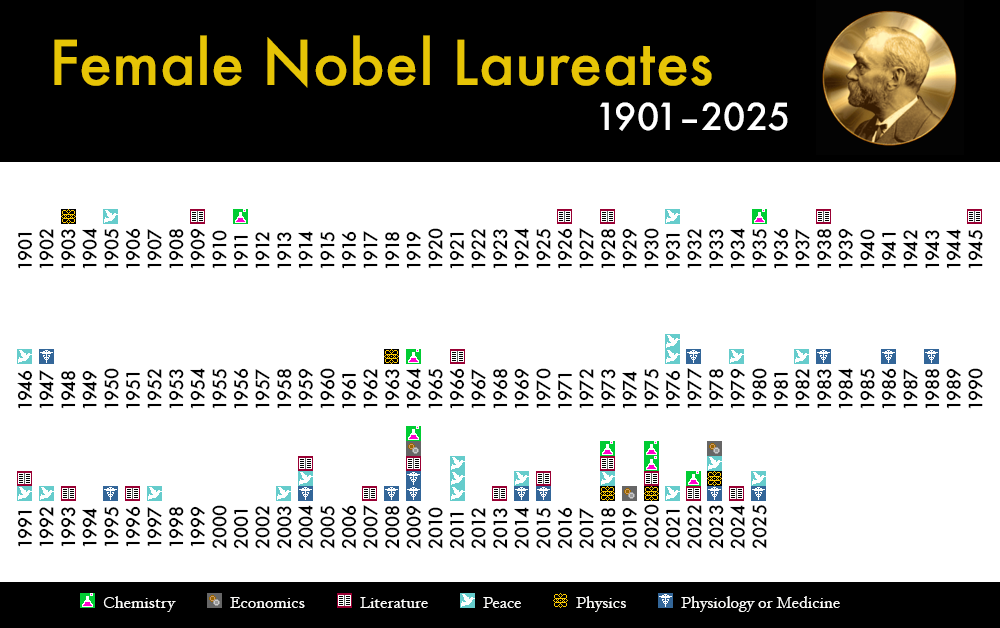
All Nobel Prizes won by women (1901–2025)

The Nobel Prizes are five separate prizes that, according to Alfred Nobel's will of 1895, are awarded to "those who, during the preceding year, have conferred the greatest benefit to Mankind." Additionally, the Sveriges Riksbank Prize in Economic Sciences in Memory of Alfred Nobel (often referred to as the Nobel Prize in Economics) was established by Sveriges Riksbank in 1968 and is awarded to a "person or persons in the field of economic sciences who have produced work of outstanding importance."

As of 2025, according to the Nobel Foundation, 68 Nobel Prizes and the Memorial Prize in Economic Sciences have been awarded to 67 women (Marie Curie has been honoured twice, first in Physics in 1903, then in Chemistry in 1911). Unique Nobel Prize laureates include 894 men, 64 women, and 27 organizations.

The approximate distribution of Nobel prizes awarded to women is as follows (regularly updated list from the Nobel Foundation can be found on their website at "Nobel-Prize awarded women" ):

- twenty women have won the Nobel Peace Prize (16.3% of 110 awarded);
- eighteen have won the Nobel Prize in Literature (15% of 120 awarded);
- fourteen have won the Nobel Prize in Physiology or Medicine (5.6% of 230 awarded);
- eight have won the Nobel Prize in Chemistry (4.1% of 191 awarded);
- five have won the Nobel Prize in Physics (1.8% of 224 awarded);
- and three (Elinor Ostrom, Esther Duflo and Claudia Goldin) have won the Nobel Memorial Prize in Economic Sciences (2.17% of 92 awarded).

The first woman to win a Nobel Prize was Marie Skłodowska-Curie, who won the Nobel Prize in Physics in 1903 with Pierre Curie and Henri Becquerel. Curie is also the first person and the only woman to have won multiple Nobel Prizes; in 1911, she won the Nobel Prize in Chemistry. Curie's daughter, Irène Joliot-Curie, won the Nobel Prize in Chemistry in 1935, making the two the only mother–daughter pair to have won Nobel Prizes and of Pierre and Irène Curie the only father-daughter pair to have won Nobel Prizes by the same occasion, whilst there are 6 father-son pairs who have won Nobel Prizes by comparison.

The most recent women to be awarded a Nobel Prize were Anne Carson in Literature (2026), Maria Corina Machado for Peace, Mary Brunkow for Physiology or Medicine (2025), Claudia Goldin in Economics, Narges Mohammadi for Peace, Anne L'Huillier in Physics and Katalin Karikó in Physiology or Medicine (2023), Annie Ernaux in Literature and Carolyn R. Bertozzi for Chemistry (2022), Maria Ressa for Peace (2021), Louise Glück in Literature, Andrea M. Ghez in Physics, Emmanuelle Charpentier and Jennifer Doudna in Chemistry (2020). The most Nobel Prizes awarded to women in a single year was in 2009, when five women became laureates in four categories.

== Female laureates ==
=== Physiology or Medicine ===
No.	Year	Portrait	Name	Born	Died	Rationale
1	1947		Gerty Radnitz-Cori	15 August 1896; Prague, Austria-Hungary (Note: Presently the Czech Republic.)	26 October 1957; Glendale, Missouri, United States	""for their discovery of the course of the catalytic conversion of glycogen." (shared with Carl Ferdinand Cori and Bernardo Houssay)
2	1977		Rosalyn Yalow	19 July 1921; New York City, United States	30 May 2011; The Bronx, New York, United States	"for the development of radioimmunoassays of peptide hormones." (shared with Roger Guillemin and Andrew Schally)
3	1983		Barbara McClintock	16 June 1902; Hartford, Connecticut, United States	2 September 1992; Huntington, New York, United States	"for her discovery of mobile genetic elements."
4	1986		Rita Levi-Montalcini	22 April 1909; Turin, Kingdom of Italy (Note: Presently the Italian Republic.)	30 December 2012; Rome, Italy	"for their discoveries of growth factors." (shared with Stanley Cohen)
5	1988		Gertrude Belle Elion	23 January 1918; New York City, United States	21 February 1999; Chapel Hill, North Carolina, United States	"for their discoveries of important principles for drug treatment." (shared with James W. Black and George H. Hitchings)
6	1995		Christiane Nüsslein-Volhard	20 October 1942; Magdeburg, Saxony-Anhalt, Nazi Germany (Note: Presently the Federal Republic of Germany.)	(aged 84)	"for their discoveries concerning the genetic control of early embryonic development." (shared with Edward B. Lewis and Eric F. Wieschaus)
7	2004		Linda Buck	29 January 1947; Seattle, Washington, United States	(aged 79)	"for their discoveries of odorant receptors and the organization of the olfactory system" (shared with Richard Axel)
8	2008		Françoise Barré-Sinoussi	30 July 1947; Paris, (France) French Fourth Republic (Note: Presently the French Fifth Republic.)	(aged 79)	"for their discovery of HIV, human immunodeficiency virus." (shared with Harald zur Hausen and Luc Montagnier)
9	2009		Elizabeth Blackburn	26 November 1948; Hobart, Tasmania, Australia	(aged 77)	"for the discovery of how chromosomes are protected by telomeres and the enzyme telomerase." (shared with Jack W. Szostak)
10	2009		Carolyn Greider	15 April 1961; San Diego, California, United States	(aged 65)	"for the discovery of how chromosomes are protected by telomeres and the enzyme telomerase." (shared with Jack W. Szostak)
11	2014		May-Britt Moser	4 January 1963; Fosnavåg, Norway	(aged 63)	"for their discoveries of cells that constitute a positioning system in the brain." (shared with Edvard Moser and John O'Keefe)
12	2015		Tú Yōuyōu	30 December 1930; Ningbo, Zhejiang, People's Republic of China (Note: Presently the People's Republic of China.)	(aged 95)	"for her discoveries concerning a novel therapy against malaria." (shared with William C. Campbell and Satoshi Ōmura)
13	2023		Katalin Karikó	17 January 1955; Szolnok, (Hungary) Hungarian People's Republic (Note: Presently the Third Hungarian Republic.)	(aged 71)	"for their discoveries concerning nucleoside base modifications that enabled the development of effective mRNA vaccines against COVID-19." (shared with Drew Weissman)
14	2025		Mary Brunkow	1961; Portland, Oregon, United States	(aged 65)	"for their discoveries concerning peripheral immune tolerance." (shared with Fred Ramsdell and Shimon Sakaguchi)

=== Physics ===
No.	Year	Portrait	Name	Born	Died	Rationale
1	1903		Marie Skłodowska-Curie	7 November 1867; Warsaw, Congress Kingdom of Poland, Russian Empire (Note: Presently the Republic of Poland.)	4 July 1934; Passy, Haute-Savoie, (France) French Third Republic	"in recognition of the extraordinary services they have rendered by their joint researches on the radiation phenomena discovered by Professor Henri Becquerel" (shared with Pierre Curie and Henri Becquerel)
2	1963		Maria Göppert Mayer	28 June 1906; Katowice, Prussia, German Empire	20 February 1972; San Diego, California, United States	"for their discoveries concerning nuclear shell structure." (shared with J. Hans D. Jensen and Eugene Wigner)
3	2018		Donna Strickland	27 May 1959; Guelph, Ontario, Canada	(aged 67)	"for their method of generating high-intensity, ultra-short optical pulses." (shared with Gérard Mourou)
4	2020		Andrea Mia Ghez	16 June 1965; New York City, United States	(aged 61)	"for the discovery of a supermassive compact object at the centre of our galaxy." (shared with Reinhard Genzel)
5	2023		Anne L’Huillier	16 August 1958; Paris, (France) French Fourth Republic	(aged 68)	"for experimental methods that generate attosecond pulses of light for the study of electron dynamics in matter." (shared with Pierre Agostini and Ferenc Krausz)

=== Chemistry ===
No.	Year	Portrait	Name	Born	Died	Rationale
1	1911		Marie Skłodowska-Curie	7 November 1867; Warsaw, Congress Kingdom of Poland, Russian Empire	4 July 1934; Passy, Haute-Savoie, (France) French Third Republic	"for her discovery of radium and polonium"
2	1935		Irène Joliot-Curie	12 September 1897; Paris, (France) French Third Republic	17 March 1957; Paris, (France) French Fourth Republic	"for their synthesis of new radioactive elements" (shared with Frédéric Joliot-Curie)
3	1964		Dorothy Crowfoot Hodgkin	12 May 1910; Cairo, Khedivate of Egypt (Note: Presently the Arab Republic of Egypt.)	29 July 1994; Ilmington, Warwickshire, United Kingdom	"for her determinations by X-ray techniques of the structures of important biochemical substances"
4	2009		Ada Yonath	22 June 1939; Jerusalem, Mandatory Palestine (Note: Presently part of Israel and Palestine, see Status of Jerusalem for details.)	31 August 2026; Jerusalem, Israel	"for studies of the structure and function of the ribosome." (shared with Venkatraman Ramakrishnan and Thomas A. Steitz)
5	2018		Frances Arnold	25 July 1956; Edgewood, Pennsylvania, United States	(aged 70)	"for the directed evolution of enzymes" (shared with Gregory Winter and George Smith)
6	2020		Emmanuelle Charpentier	11 December 1968; Juvisy-sur-Orge, Essonne, France	(aged 57)	"for the development of a method for genome editing."
7	2020		Jennifer Doudna	19 February 1964; Washington, D.C. United States	(aged 62)	"for the development of a method for genome editing."
8	2022		Carolyn Bertozzi	10 October 1966; Boston, Massachusetts, United States	(aged 60)	"for the development of click chemistry and bioorthogonal chemistry." (shared with Morten P. Meldal and Karl Barry Sharpless)

=== Literature ===
No.	Year	Portrait	Name	Born	Died	Rationale
1	1909		Selma Lagerlöf	20 November 1858; Sunne, Värmland, (Union between Sweden and Norway) United Kingdoms of Sweden and Norway (Note: Presently the Kingdom of Sweden.)	16 March 1940; Sunne, Värmland, Sweden	"in appreciation of the lofty idealism, vivid imagination and spiritual perception that characterize her writings."
2	1926		Grazia Deledda	27 September 1871; Nuoro, Sardinia, Kingdom of Italy	15 August 1936; Rome, Kingdom of Italy	"for her idealistically inspired writings which with plastic clarity picture the life on her native island and with depth and sympathy deal with human problems in general."
3	1928		Sigrid Undset	20 May 1882; Kalundborg, Zealand, Denmark	10 June 1949; Lillehammer, Norway	"principally for her powerful descriptions of Northern life during the Middle Ages."
4	1938		Pearl Buck	26 June 1892; Hillsboro, West Virginia, United States	6 March 1973; Danby, Vermont, United States	"for her rich and truly epic descriptions of peasant life in China and for her biographical masterpieces."
5	1945		Gabriela Mistral	7 April 1889; Vicuña, Chile	10 January 1957; Hempstead, New York, United States	"for her lyric poetry which, inspired by powerful emotions, has made her name a symbol of the idealistic aspirations of the entire Latin American world."
6	1966		Nelly Sachs	10 December 1891; Berlin, German Empire	12 May 1970; Stockholm, Sweden	"for her outstanding lyrical and dramatic writing, which interprets Israel's destiny with touching strength." (shared with Shmuel Yosef Agnon)
7	1991		Nadine Gordimer	20 November 1923; Springs, Gauteng, (United Kingdom) Union of South Africa (Note: Presently the Republic of South Africa.)	13 July 2014; Johannesburg, Gauteng, South Africa	"who through her magnificent epic writing has - in the words of Alfred Nobel - been of very great benefit to humanity."
8	1993		Toni Morrison	18 February 1931; Lorain, Ohio, United States	5 August 2019; New York City, United States	"who in novels characterized by visionary force and poetic import, gives life to an essential aspect of American reality."
9	1996		Wisława Szymborska	2 July 1923; Kórnik, (Poland) Second Polish Republic	1 February 2012; Kraków, Poland	"for poetry that with ironic precision allows the historical and biological context to come to light in fragments of human reality."
10	2004		Elfriede Jelinek	20 October 1946; Mürzzuschlag, Styria, Austria	(aged 80)	"for her musical flow of voices and counter-voices in novels and plays that with extraordinary linguistic zeal reveal the absurdity of society's clichés and their subjugating power."
11	2007		Doris Lessing	22 October 1919; Kermanshah, (Qajar Iran) Guarded Domains of Iran (Note: Presently the Islamic Republic of Iran.)	17 November 2013; London, United Kingdom	"that epicist of the female experience, who with scepticism, fire and visionary power has subjected a divided civilisation to scrutiny."
12	2009		Herta Müller	17 August 1953; Nițchidorf, (Socialist Republic of Romania) Romanian People's Republic (Note: Presently Romania.)	(aged 73)	"who, with the concentration of poetry and the frankness of prose, depicts the landscape of the dispossessed."
13	2013		Alice Munro	10 July 1931; Wingham, Ontario, Canada	13 May 2024; Port Hope, Ontario, Canada	"master of the contemporary short story"
14	2015		Svetlana Alexievich	31 May 1948; Stanislav, Ukrainian SSR, Soviet Union (Note: Presently Ivano-Frankivsk, Ukraine.)	(aged 78)	"for her polyphonic writings, a monument to suffering and courage in our time."
15	2018		Olga Tokarczuk	29 January 1962; Sulechów, Poland	(aged 64)	"for a narrative imagination that with encyclopedic passion represents the crossing of boundaries as a form of life."
16	2020		Louise Glück	22 April 1943; New York City, United States	13 October 2023; Cambridge, Massachusetts, United States	"for her unmistakable poetic voice that with austere beauty makes individual existence universal."
17	2022		Annie Ernaux	1 September 1940; Lillebonne, Seine-Maritime, Military Administration in France	(aged 86)	"for the courage and clinical acuity with which she uncovers the roots, estrangements and collective restraints of personal memory."
18	2024		Han Kang	27 November 1970; Gwangju, South Korea	(aged 55)	"for her intense poetic prose that confronts historical traumas and exposes the fragility of human life."
19	2026		Anne Carson	21 June 1950; Toronto, Canada	(aged 76)	"for her bold and inventive oeuvre that, in playful dialogue with the classical tradition, has created new forms for contemporary literature."

=== Peace ===
No.	Year	Portrait	Name	Born	Died	Rationale
1	1905		Bertha von Suttner	9 June 1843; Prague, Austrian Empire	21 June 1914; Vienna, Austria-Hungary (Note: Presently the Second Austrian Republic.)	"for her audacity to oppose the horrors of war."
2	1931		Jane Addams	6 September 1860; Cedarville, Illinois, United States	21 May 1935; Chicago, Illinois, United States	"for their assiduous effort to revive the ideal of peace and to rekindle the spirit of peace in their own nation and in the whole of mankind." (shared with Nicholas Murray Butler)
3	1946		Emily Greene Balch	8 January 1867; Boston, Massachusetts, United States	9 January 1961; Cambridge, Massachusetts, United States	"for her lifelong work for the cause of peace." (shared with John Raleigh Mott)
4	1976		Betty Williams	22 May 1943; Belfast, Northern Ireland, United Kingdom	17 March 2020; Belfast, Northern Ireland, United Kingdom	"for the courageous efforts in founding a movement to put an end to the violent conflict in Northern Ireland."
5	1976		Mairead Maguire	27 January 1944; Belfast, Northern Ireland, United Kingdom	(aged 82)	"for the courageous efforts in founding a movement to put an end to the violent conflict in Northern Ireland."
6	1979		Anjezë Gonxhe Bojaxhiu (rel. name: Mother Teresa)	26 August 1910; Skopje, Ottoman Empire (Note: Presently the Republic of North Macedonia.)	5 September 1997; Kolkata, West Bengal, India	"for her work for bringing help to suffering humanity."
7	1982		Alva Myrdal	31 January 1902; Uppsala, (Union between Sweden and Norway) United Kingdoms of Sweden and Norway	1 February 1986; Danderyd, Sweden	"for their work for disarmament and nuclear and weapon-free zones." (shared with Alfonso García Robles)
8	1991		Aung San Suu Kyi	19 June 1945; Yangon, State of Burma (Note: Presently the Republic of the Union of Myanmar.)	(aged 81)	"for her non-violent struggle for democracy and human rights."
9	1992		Rigoberta Menchú	9 January 1959; Laj Chimel, Quiché, Guatemala	(aged 67)	"in recognition of her work for social justice and ethno-cultural reconciliation based on respect for the rights of indigenous peoples."
10	1997		Jody Williams	9 October 1950; Rutland, Vermont, United States	(aged 76)	"for their work for the banning and clearing of anti-personnel mines." (shared with the International Campaign to Ban Landmines)
11	2003		Shirin Ebadi	21 June 1947; Hamadan, (Pahlavi Iran) Imperial State of Iran	(aged 79)	"for her efforts for democracy and human rights, focusing especially on the struggle for the rights of women and children."
12	2004		Wangarĩ Maathai	1 April 1940; Tetu, Nyeri, Colony and Protectorate of Kenya (Note: Presently the Republic of Kenya.)	25 September 2011; Nairobi, Kenya	"for her contribution to sustainable development, democracy and peace."
13	2011		Ellen Johnson Sirleaf	29 October 1938; Monrovia, Liberia	(aged 88)	"for their non-violent struggle for the safety of women and for women's rights to full participation in peace-building work."
14	2011		Leymah Gbowee	1 February 1972; Monrovia, Liberia	(aged 54)	"for their non-violent struggle for the safety of women and for women's rights to full participation in peace-building work."
15	2011		Tawakkol Karman	7 February 1979; Shara'b As Salam, Taiz, Yemen Arab Republic (Note: Presently the Republic of Yemen.)	(aged 47)	"for their non-violent struggle for the safety of women and for women's rights to full participation in peace-building work."
16	2014		Malala Yousafzai	12 July 1997; Mingora, Swat, Pakistan	(aged 29)	"for their struggle against the suppression of children and young people and for the right of all children to education." (shared with Kailash Satyarthi)
17	2018		Nadia Murad	10 March 1993; Kocho, Iraqi Republic (Note: Presently the Republic of Iraq.)	(aged 33)	"for their efforts to end the use of sexual violence as a weapon of war and armed conflict." (shared with Denis Mukwege)
18	2021		Maria Ressa	2 October 1963; Manila, Philippines	(aged 63)	"for their effort to safeguard freedom of expression, which is a precondition for democracy and lasting peace." (shared with Dmitry Andreyevich Muratov)
19	2023		Narges Mohammadi	21 April 1972; Zanjan, (Pahlavi Iran) Imperial State of Iran	(aged 54)	"for her fight against the oppression of women in Iran and her fight to promote human rights and freedom for all."
20	2025		María Corina Machado	7 October 1967; Caracas, Venezuela	(aged 59)	"for her tireless work promoting democratic rights for the people of Venezuela and for her struggle to achieve a just and peaceful transition from dictatorship to democracy."
21	2026		Navi Pillay	23 September 1941; Durban, South Africa	(aged 85)	"for her efforts to promote peace and international law."

=== Economic Sciences ===
No.	Year	Portrait	Name	Born	Died	Rationale
1	2009		Elinor Ostrom	7 August 1933; Los Angeles, California, United States	12 June 2012; Bloomington, Indiana, United States	"for her analysis of economic governance, especially the commons." (shared with Oliver E. Williamson)
2	2019		Esther Duflo	25 October 1972; Paris, France	(aged 54)	"for their experimental approach to alleviating global poverty." (shared with Abhijit Banerjee and Michael Kremer)
3	2023		Claudia Goldin	14 May 1946; New York City, United States	(aged 80)	"for having advanced our understanding of women's labour market outcomes"
