= Devotion (1950 film) =

1950 film directed by Augusto Genina

- Directed by: Augusto Genina
- Written by: Vitaliano Brancati; Augusto Genina
- Based on: L'edera; 1908 novel by Grazia Deledda
- Produced by: Carlo Civallero
- Starring: Columba Domínguez; Roldano Lupi; Juan de Landa
- Cinematography: Marco Scarpelli
- Edited by: Elena Zanoli
- Music by: Antonio Veretti
- Distributed by: Cines
- Release date: 29 November 1950
- Running time: 78 minutes
- Country: Italy
- Language: Italian

Devotion (Italian: L'edera, "The Ivy") is a 1950 Italian melodrama film directed by Augusto Genina.

The film is adapted from the famous Italian novel L'edera written by Grazia Deledda and published in 1908.

== Synopsis ==
Annesa (played by Columba Dominguez), is from a declining aristocratic family and very much devoted to her family, the Decherchi, which is at the edge of financial collapse. The fate of the family depends on the success of their efforts to inherit the estate of a distant uncle who, is hosted by the Decherchis, because of his ill health and is now on the verge of dying. Annesa, exacerbated by the refusal of the uncle to help financially Annesa's financially strapped nephew Don Paulu Decherchi (played by Roldano Lupi), that she is secretly in love with, murders the uncle. Despite the suspicions and investigations by the police, the murder is not discovered. But Annesa, overcome by remorse, confesses her deed to a priest.

== Cast ==
- Columba Domínguez: Annesa
- Roldano Lupi: Don Paulu Decherchi
- Juan de Landa: Virdis, il sacerdote
- Franca Marzi: Zana
- Emma Baron: Donna Francesca
- Nino Pavese: Salvatore Spanu
- Gualtiero Tumiati: Zio Zua

== Reception ==
American film critic Howard Thompson wrote for The New York Times that the pairing of Columba Dominguez and Rolando Lupi "generate only mild conviction and, for that matter, precious little steam". He also dismissed Franca Marzi's performance as "vacuous". He complimented Gualtiero Tumiata as "turning in a good, gusty performance as the village priest".
