= Helen Hester Colvill =

British writer (1854–1941)

- Born: 1854; Winchmore Hill
- Died: 1941; Oxford
- Occupations: Novelist, essayist

Helen Hester Colvill (5 March 1854 – 6 November 1941) was a British novelist, translator, poet, and essayist who published under her own name and the pseudonym Katharine Wylde.

Colvill was born on 5 March 1854 in Winchmore Hill, the daughter of Lieutenant Colonel Thomas Harpur Colvill and Barbara Maconchy Colvill. She published five novels as "Katharine Wylde" and four more under her own name. These included The Incubus (1910), which features two contrasting sisters, one intellectual and one sensual, and the former's search for the latter. She wrote a biography of Saint Teresa of Avila called Saint Teresa of Spain (1910). She published essays on numerous topics, such as against women's suffrage in “Power, Direct and Indirect" in the Anti-Suffrage Review (1910) and the dangers of socialism in "Anarchy." She also published several translations of the work of Italian Nobel Prize winner Grazia Deledda.

Katharine Wylde died in 6 November 1941 in Oxford.

== Bibliography ==
- A Dreamer. 3 vol. Edinburgh: Blackwood, 1880.
- An Ill-Regulated Mind: A Novel. 1 vol. Edinburgh: Blackwood, 1885.
- Mr. Bryant's Mistake: A Novel. 3 vol. London: Bentley, 1890.
- The Princess Royal. 3 vol. London: Bentley, 1894.
- Our Wills and Fates. London: Osgood, McIlvaine, 1897.
- Nostalgia. Chapman, 1905. (Translation of Nostalgie by Grazia Deledda)
- The Stepping Stone. London: A. Constable, 1905.
- Ashes: A Sardinian Story. London and New York: John Lane, 1908. (Translation of Cénere by Grazia Deledda)
- Lady Julia's Emerald. London and New York: J. Lane, 1908.
- The Incubus. London: Chatto and Windus, 1910.
- Saint Teresa of Spain. London: Methuen & Co., 1910.
- The Lily of Lombardy. Melrose, 1928.
- In the Footsteps of a Saint, and other Sketches from Spain. Burns, Oates & W., 1932.
