= Safa Karman =

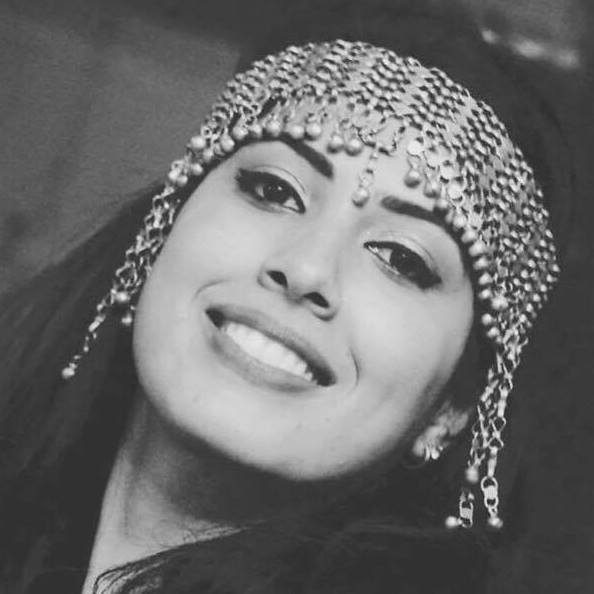
- Born: June 5, 1987 (age 39); Taiz, Yemen
- Education: Harvard Law School, Oxford University, Sana'a University
- Occupations: Journalist, analyst, and researcher

Safa Karman (born June 5, 1987) is an investigative journalist, a political commentator, and a researcher. She earned her Master in Laws degree from Harvard Law School in May 2018, marking the first degree ever awarded by Harvard Law to a Yemeni citizen.

She received her degree in Master of Public Policy on November 3, 2018, from Oxford University.

In 2010, Safa joined Al Jazeera Media Network and became the first Yemeni woman to join the network and the youngest to be assigned top news coverage at the time. She is best known for her highly acclaimed investigative documentary "The Road to Sana’a" which examines who paved the way for the Houthi Militias to take over the Yemeni capital Sana'a on September 21, 2014. She is also known for her short series of reports "Yemen, the Land and the People”, her coverage of Egypt's 2012 presidential elections, and her reporting on the Arab Spring and its aftermath, especially Yemen's 2011 revolution. Safa is a co-founder and board member of "Be Human Initiative", the first Yemeni NGO to organize awareness campaigns for war and conflict-related posttraumatic stress disorder (PTSD). In 2007, Safa was elected vice president of the Legal and Constitutional Committee of the Youth Shura [Consultation] Council which was founded as a civil society body in parallel to the government's Supreme Shura Council to assist the latter with legal issues concerning the Youth. During her undergraduate studies, Safa worked as an English teacher for two years at one of Yemen's most prestigious English Institutes, Exceed Language Center. She earned her bachelor's degree in Law and Sharia from Sana'a University in Yemen in 2009.

== Personal life ==
Safa was born in the Yemeni city Taiz on June 5, 1987, but was mainly raised in the capital Sana'a. She is the youngest among ten children and comes from a very well-known political family. Her father is Abdulsalam Karman, a lawyer and a prominent politician, who once served and later resigned as Minister of Legal Affairs in Ali Abdullah Saleh's government. Her sister is Tawakkol Karman, the first Arab female to receive the Nobel Peace Prize.

== Career ==
Safa began her journey by volunteering with different NGOs and organizing social and political debates between Yemenis themselves and Yemenis with international visitors. As a law student, she was elected vice president of the Legal and Constitutional Committee in the Youth Shura Council, a parallel body to the Upper House, and a project of the Democracy School. Safa also worked as an English teacher and supervisor for two years (2008–2010) before leaving to join the Al Jazeera Network in Doha, Qatar. She is the co-founder and board member of "Be A Human Initiative", an NGO in Yemen that provide psychological treatment and support for war-zone civilians suffering from war and conflict-related posttraumatic stress disorder (PTSD).

== Education ==
Safa Karman is the first Yemeni citizen to graduate from Harvard Law School and hold two master's degrees from both Harvard and Oxford Universities. In 2009, Safa got her undergraduate degree in Law and Sharia from Sana'a University in Yemen. She graduated from Arw High School.

She also had several professional training courses from Al-Jazeera training & development center and a certificate in Film-Making in Hi-Definition from New York Film Academy. She graduated from the Yemen-American Language Institute (YALI) in 2005. Safa speaks Arabic as her native language and fluent English as well.
