= Charles Andler =

French germanist and philosopher (1866–1933)

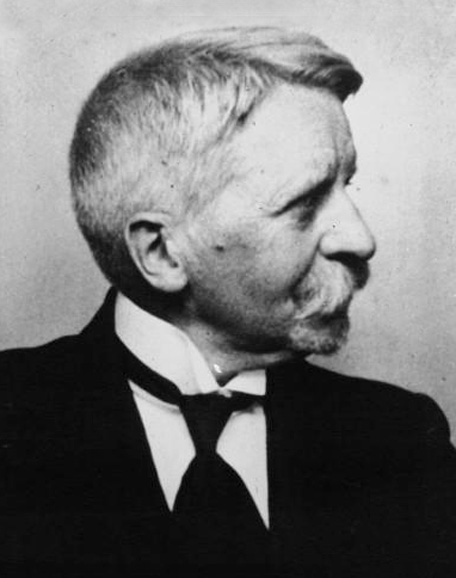
Charles Andler

Charles Philippe Théodore Andler (11 March 1866, Strasbourg – 1 April 1933, Malesherbes, Loiret) was a French Germanist and philosopher.

== Life ==
Andler was born to a Protestant family in Strasbourg. In 1887 and 1888, Andler failed to achieve his agrégation in philosophy, judged by Jules Lachelier, inspector-general in charge of philosophy, as showing "excessive bias" towards German philosophy. He therefore changed to take the German literature agrégation in 1889, passing out top of his class. Andler became professor of German at the Sorbonne in 1901 and at the Collège de France in 1926. Amongst his works were writings on Nietzsche, a commentary on The Communist Manifesto, and a life of his friend Lucien Herr.

== Works ==
- Les origines du socialisme d'état en Allemagne, 1897 – The origins of state socialism in Germany.
- Collection de Documents sur le Pangermanisme, 4 vols, 1915–1917 – Collection of documents on Pan-Germanism.
- Nietzsche, sa vie et sa pensée, 6 vols, 1920 – Nietzsche, his life and thinking.
- Vie de Lucien Herr (1864-1926), 1932 – The life of Lucien Herr.
