= Fehmi Koru =

Turkish journalist and columnist

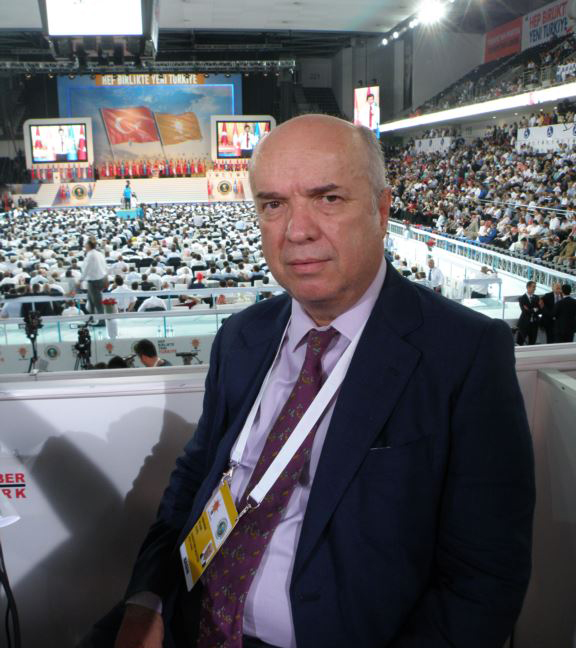
- Born: 24 July 1950 (age 75); İzmir, Turkey
- Education: Harvard University (M.A., 1982)
- Occupations: Freelance Writer and Blogger
- Spouse: Nebahat Koru
- Website: https://fehmikoru.com

Fehmi Koru^{§} (born 24 July 1950, in İzmir) is a Turkish journalist and columnist.

== Background ==
Koru studied theology at the Institute of High Islamic Studies, Izmir/Turkey (1973), and received his master's degree from the Center for Middle Eastern Studies of Harvard University (1982), in between he spent 15 months in London (1977–1978) to study English and a year in Damascus/Syria to improve his Arabic, at Dar-es Selam Arabic Language Center (1979).

He also worked as a research affiliate at the Center for International Studies of Massachusetts Institute of Technology (1980–1982).

== Career ==
Served as a consultant in the State Planning Organisation (1985–1986).

He was the editor of the daily Milli Gazete (1984) and worked at daily Zaman from its inception (1986), first as the editor in chief (1986–1987) then as the chief editorial writer as well as Ankara Bureau Chief (1995–1998). He wrote for ‘Turkish Daily News’ (1999–2000), and ‘The New Anatolian’ (2006); both are English language dailies.

He then joined in daily Yeni Şafak as Ankara Bureau Chief (1999) and was also its chief columnist until 2010. He later joined Daily Star (2011–2014).

He was a columnist in the daily Haberturk (2014–2016).

Currently, he is a freelance writer and blogger. He continues writing on his personal webpage.

He was a regular commentator on Turkish TV Kanal-7 (1995–2015).

He has appeared regularly on various TV political programs:

Title	Channel	Years
Başkent Kulisi	Flash TV, Kanal-7	1994–2003
Konuşa Konuşa	Kanal-7	1997
Ters Köşe	Kanal-7	2004–2005
Basın Odası	NTV	2003–2005
Medya Durağı	TV8	2004–2005
Beyin Fırtınası	ATV, ahaber	2007–2012
Acaba	Kanal 24	2007–2009
Politik Açılım	TRT-1	2008–2012
Siyaset 24	Kanal 24	2011–2012
Enine Boyuna	Haberturk TV	2012–2016

He was the recipient of several prestigious press awards including one from Turkish Journalists Association (2003) and another from Progressive Journalists Association of Turkey (2003).

He participated in many scholarly symposia and meetings in and out of Turkey, attended to Bilderberg Conference of 2006.

== Books ==
His journalistic work has been published in seven books in Turkish and one in English.

- Ben Böyle Gördüm: Cemaat'in Siyasetle Sınavı (Thus I Have Seen: Test Case for Gülen Group in Politics)
- Mekke'de Ne Oldu? (What Happened in Mecca)
- Taha Kıvanç'ın Not Defteri (Diary of Taha Kivanc)
- Terör ve Güneydoğu Sorunu (Terror and the Kurdish Problem)
- Yeni Dünya Düzeni (New World Order)
- Tabana Kuvvet (On the Road)
- 11 Eylül: O Kader Sabahı (9/11: That Fateful Morning)
- One Column Ahead

His article ‘Democracy and Islam: The Turkish Experiment’ came out in Sept/Oct 1996 issue of ‘Muslim Politics Report’ of the Council on Foreign Relations.

== Personal life ==
He is married with Dr. Nebahat Koru and has five children.

His brother Naci Koru is currently Deputy Foreign Minister, and he previously served as Turkey's Ambassador in Riyadh, Saudi Arabia. He will takeover his position as permanent representative of Turkey in United Nations Office in Geneve.

While he was in London he shared a flat with Abdullah Gül, who later on became Prime Minister and then President of Republic of Turkey.

== Notes ==
- ^§ Koru has used several aliases, Taha Kıvanç is the most known of all.
