= 2011 Nobel Peace Prize =

The 2011 Nobel Peace Prize
- Tawakkul Karman, Leymah Gbowee, and Ellen Johnson Sirleaf
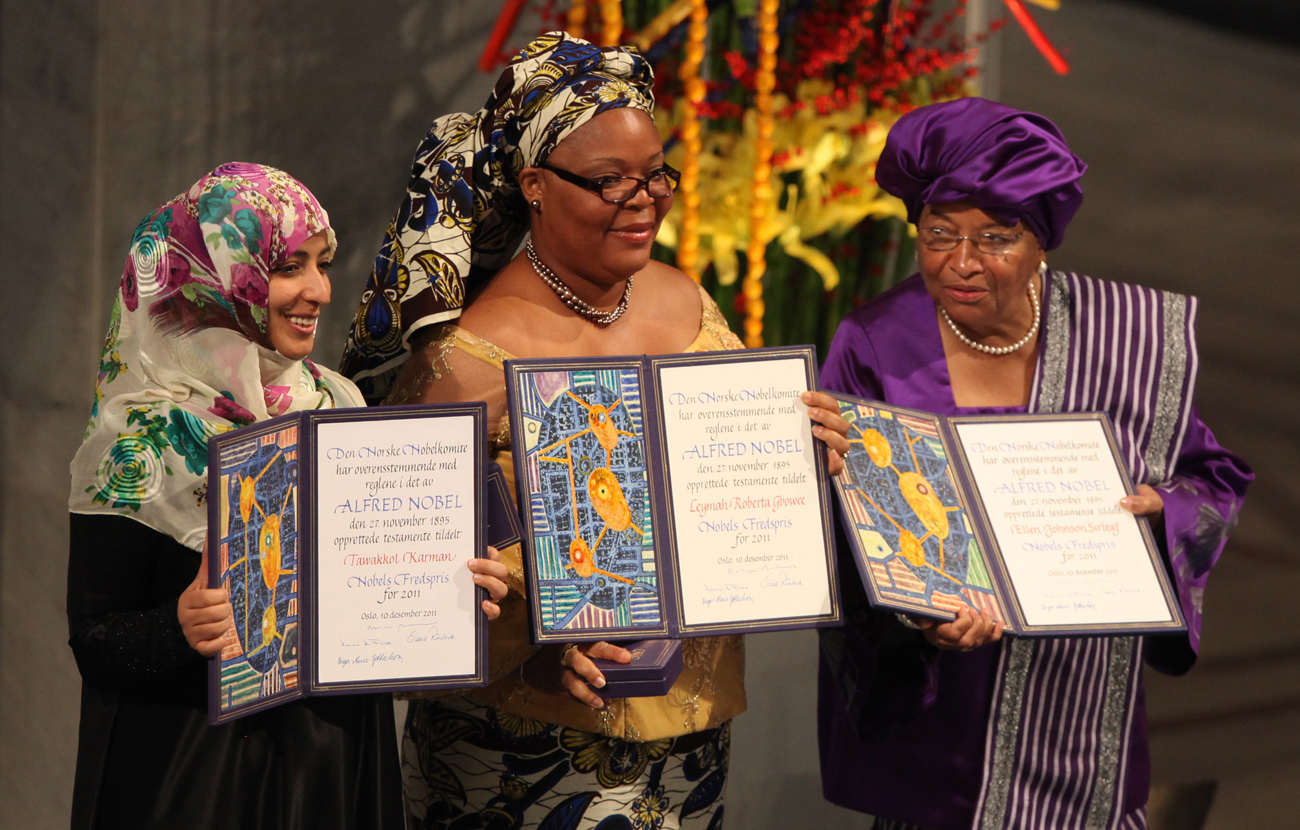
- From left to right: Karman, Gbowee, and Johnson Sirleaf "for their non-violent struggle for the safety of women and for women’s rights to full participation in peace-building work."
- Date: 7 October 2011 (announcement by Thorbjørn Jagland); 10 December 2011 (ceremony)
- Location: Oslo, Norway
- Presented by: Norwegian Nobel Committee
- Reward: 10 million SEK ($1.5M)
- Website: Official website

The 2011 Nobel Peace Prize was jointly awarded to three female political activists. Two African and one Asian woman were awarded for their persistence in obtaining equal rights for women.

== Laureates ==
The joint laureated were: Liberian President Ellen Johnson Sirleaf (b. 1938), Liberian activist Leymah Gbowee (b. 1972) and Yemeni politician Tawakkul Karman (b. 1979) "for their non-violent struggle for the safety of women and for women’s rights to full participation in peace-building work". In announcing the award on 7 October 2011, the chairman of the Norwegian Nobel Committee, Thorbjørn Jagland, stressed the link between women's rights, peace and democracy.

== Nomination and announcement ==
The winner is selected by the Norwegian Nobel Committee from nominations by others. There were 241 nominations for the 2011 award, which included the European Union, WikiLeaks and individuals connected with the Arab Spring such as Israa Abdel Fattah and Wael Ghonim.

The five members of the Nobel Committee are appointed by the Norwegian Parliament to roughly reflect the party makeup of that body. The Committee members may not be current parliament members or government officials.

== Reactions ==
The reactions from politicians and commentators to the 2011 prize were positive but Winston Tubman, who stood against Ellen Johnson Sirleaf in the 2011 presidential election, criticised the award, accusing Sirleaf of being "a warmonger".
