= After the Divorce =

1902 novel by Grazia Deledda

- First English edition (1905)
- Author: Grazia Deledda
- Original title: Dopo il divorzio
- Language: Italian
- Publisher: Roux e Viarengo
- Publication date: 1902
- Publication place: Italy
- English publication date: 1905

After the Divorce is a novel by Italian author Grazia Deledda.

== Plot ==
This tragedy is set in Sardinia. Constantino Ledda is convicted on charges for murdering his wicked uncle. Constantino is innocent, but he accepts the verdict because of his wife, Giovanna. After Constantino is convicted, Giovanna has no economic means to support her family, so she divorces her husband and remarries, this time to a wealthy but cruel landowner. Constantino is released after the real killer confesses, and he and Giovanna start a forbidden romance.

== Bibliography ==
- Title: After the Divorce
- Author: Grazia Deledda
- Translated by: Susan Ashe
- Editor Northwestern University Press, 1995
- ISBN 0810112493, 9780810112490
- 174 pages
