= Doha Centre for Media Freedom =

Doha Centre for Media Freedom (DCMF)
- Founded: 7 December 2007
- Type: Non-profit organization
- Purpose: Press freedom, emergency assistance to journalists, media literacy
- Location: Doha, Qatar
- Region served: Qatar, Middle East, and the world
- Website: www.dc4mf.org

The Doha Centre for Media Freedom (DCMF) was a non-profit organization working for press freedom and quality journalism in Qatar, the Middle East, and the world. It was formally created on December 7, 2007, by Sheikh Hamad bin Khalifa Al Thani, the Emir of Qatar, and opened in October 2008 in Doha, Qatar. It was closed down on 16 April 2020.

== Management ==
The Doha Centre for Media Freedom was administered by a Board of Governors composed of 12 members from around the world and chaired by Sheikh Hamad bin Thamer Al Thani.

The board members were: Alaa Al Aswany, Jassim Marzouq Boodai, Paulo Coelho, Burhan Ghalioun, Lilli Gruber, Mohsen Marzouk, Miguel Ángel Moratinos Cuyaubé, Patrick Poivre d’Arvor, Allister Sparks, Shashi Tharoor, and Dominique de Villepin.

The centre also had an Advisory Council of 10 members. They were: Nasser Al Othman, José Luis Arnaut, Daniel Barenboim, Ethan Bronner, Chris Cramer, Mia Farrow, Fehmi Koru, and Gracia Machel. Dr. Hamad bin Abdulaziz Al-Kuwari, Qatar's minister of Culture, Arts and Heritage chaired the Advisory Council.

Following Robert Menard’s resignation in June 2009, Jan Keulen served as the centre’s General Director until he was sacked in November 2013.

== Programmes ==
The centre had five programmes: emergency assistance, training, research, media literacy, and outreach.

According to the centre’s official website, the Emergency Assistance programme provided "direct support, within its means, to journalists who urgently need help, as a result of their work. The EA team assists professional journalists to find sustainable solutions to continue reporting as quickly as possible, with advice, publicity and/or financial means."

== Website ==
The centre's official website was available in English, Arabic, and French. In addition to covering the centre's activities, the website was regularly updated with breaking news and investigative features about journalism, media development, and press freedom advocacy around the world.
