= Ephysius =

Christian martyr

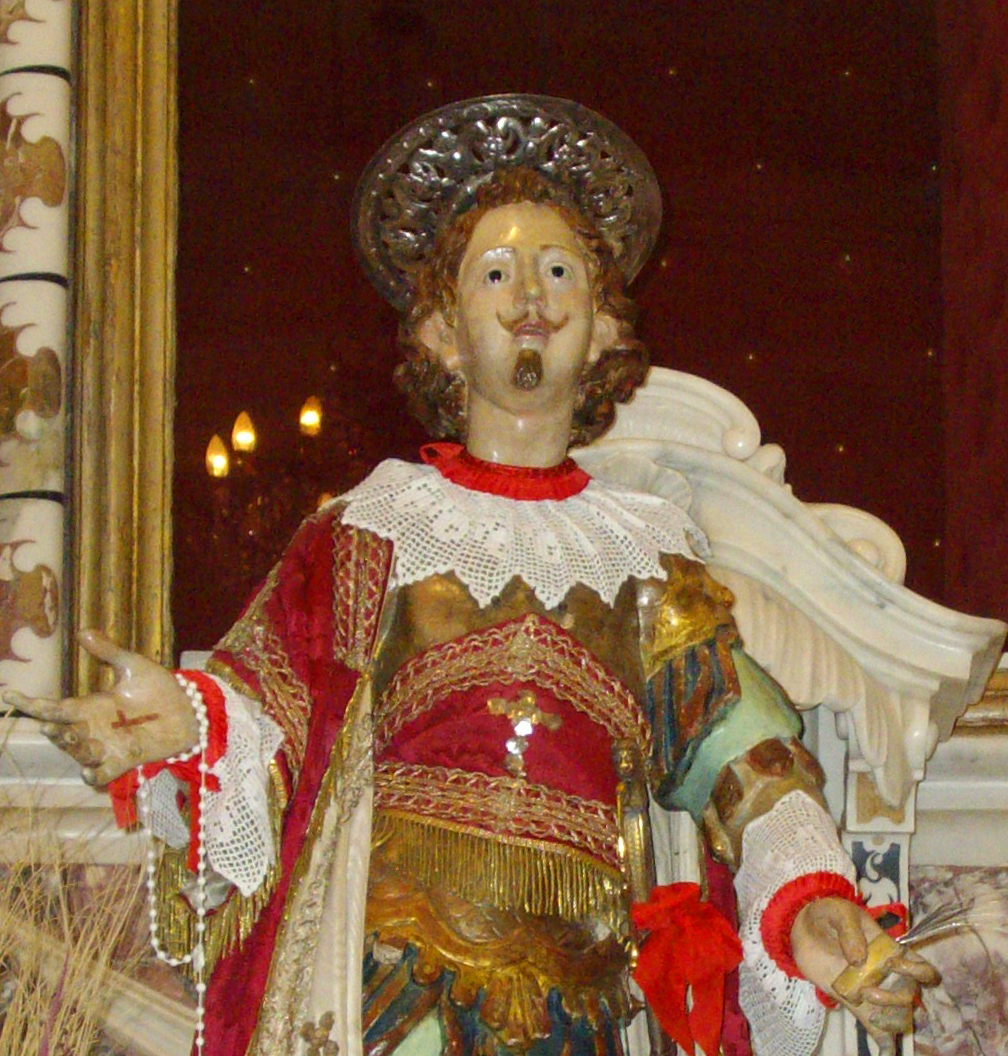
Statue of the saint in the church of Sant'Efisio, Cagliari.

Ephysius of Sardinia (250?–303?) is a Christian martyr. Nothing is known of his life, except his martyrdom. He is the patron of Cagliari, which is the capital of the island of Sardinia, in Italy. He is especially revered in the city, where his relics lie.

== Feast of Sant'Efis ==
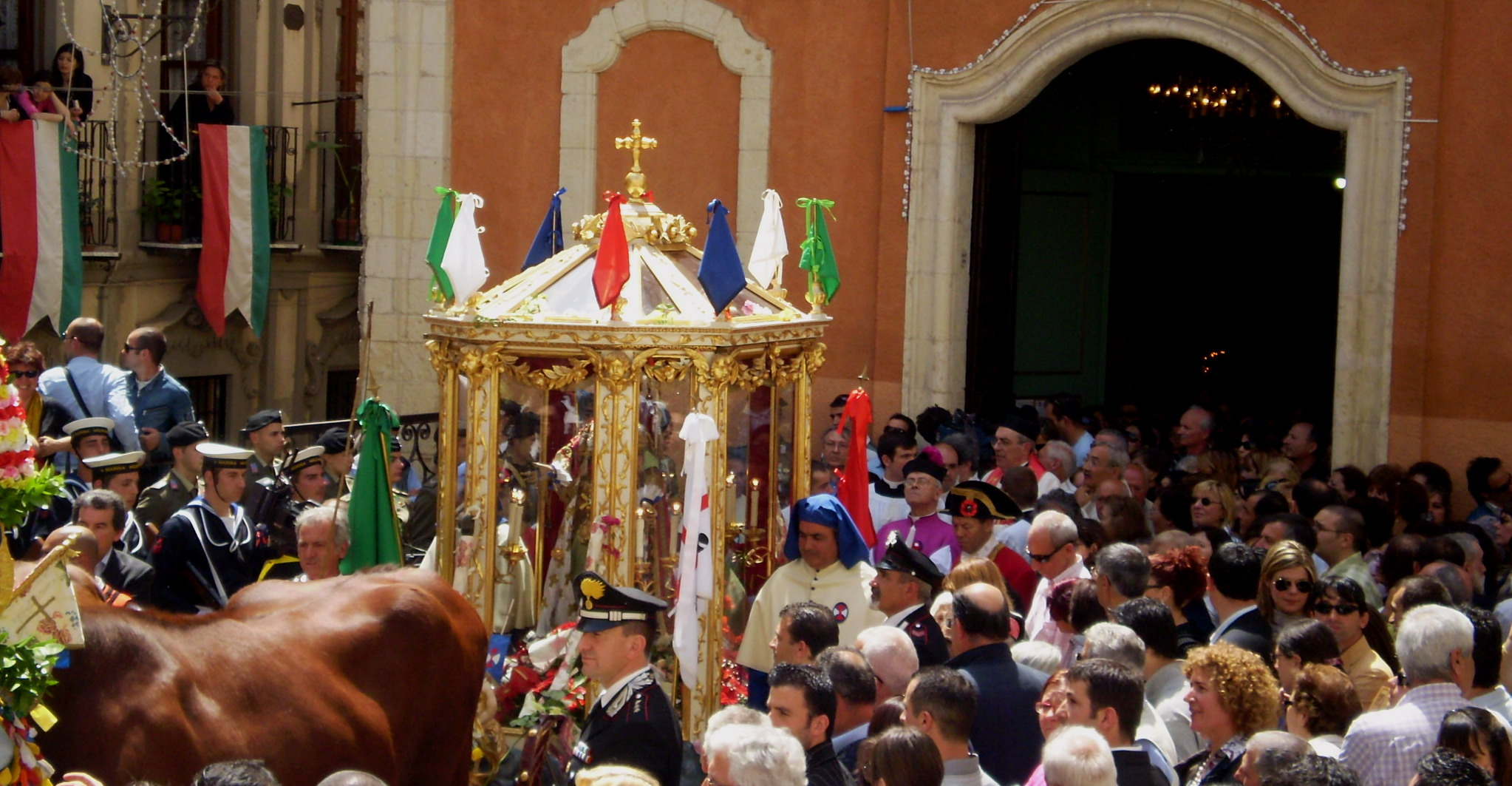
The statue of St.Ephysius escorted outside of the church

The Feast of St. Ephysius is the most important religious event of Cagliari, taking place every year on 1 May. During this festival, thousands of people from folk groups all over Sardinia wear their traditional costumes. The saint is escorted by the traditional ancient Milicia, the deputy mayor (Alter Nos), numerous confraternities, and a convoy of chariots pulled by oxen in a procession to Nora (near modern Pula), 35 km (22 mi) from Cagliari, where, according to tradition, he was beheaded. In addition to being one of the oldest, it is also the longest Italian religious procession, with about 70 km (43 mi) of walks over four days, and the largest in the Mediterranean area.
