= L'edera (novel) =

1908 novel by Grazia Deledda

L'edera (The Ivy) is a novel by Grazia Deledda published in 1908. It was translated into many languages, including an English translation by Mary Ann Freese Witt and Martha Witt with the English title Ivy.

The novel is divided into 11 chapters and it has as main characters: Annesa, Ziu Cosiumu, Don Simone, Rachele, Paulu, Gantine, Zua Decherchi and Prete Virdis.

An Italian film adaptation also titled L'edera (English title Devotion) was released in 1950 and directed by Augusto Genina.
