= Elias Portolu =

Novel by Grazia Deledda

- book cover
- Author: Grazia Deledda
- Language: Italian
- Set in: 20th-century Sardinia
- Publication date: 1900

Elias Portolu is a novel by Grazia Deledda, a Sardinian writer and winner of the 1926 Nobel Prize in Literature. The book was published in 1900 in the "Nuova Antologia". In 1903, it was published as a volume, after an initial revision by the Turin-based publishing house Roux e Viarengo. In 1917, after a second intense revision, it was republished by the Treves Brothers, and reprinted first in 1920 and then in 1928. After fourteen years, Deledda did not limit herself to simply correcting typos but, having undergone numerous rethinks, introduced innovations in hundreds of passages throughout the text. The philological, linguistic, and critical importance of the Treves edition, therefore, lies precisely in this widespread divergence in interpretation from the earlier editions. According to critics, the novel shows numerous evident affinities and consonances with the sensitivity, taste and themes of the great Russian masters of the nineteenth century, in particular Crime and Punishment by Fyodor Dostoevsky.

== Plot ==
The novel revolves around the figure of the protagonist Elias, an ex-convict who has served his sentence in a prison on the peninsula, who returns to his hometown. His relatives and friends await him with apprehension. The Portolus are a united family: the old father, a typical balente of the Nuoro area, spends words of praise on his three children, "three strong, healthy and beautiful doves like no other in Nuoro". Within what seems to be a clan (a term used by Deledda) arrives the female figure of Maria Maddalena, a very beautiful woman who is the future wife of Pietro, Elias' brother. The novel tells of the illicit and tormented love between the latter and his promised bride, thus unfolding the experience of carnal sin, betrayal and remorse that torments the two lovers. Elias decides to escape from the situation by taking refuge in his cassock, however the plot becomes complicated by Maddalena's pregnancy who, after Pietro's death, gives birth to Elias' son. Despite the pleas of the woman he loves, who urges him to raise her son as the legitimate father, Elias is determined to take priestly ordination and his decision will be irrevocable. A few years later, Elias and Maddalena's young son, suffering from a serious illness, will die.

== Italian editions ==
- 1900, Nuova Antologia, Firenze
- 1903, Roux e Viarengo, Torino
- 1917, Elias Portolu. Nuovi romanzi italiani. Milano: Treves. 1917.
- 1920, Elias Portolu. Milano: Treves. 1920. (ristampa 1928)
- 1964, Grazia Deledda. Scrittori del mondo: i Nobel. Torino: UTET. 1964. pp. 155–305. ISBN 9788860254078.
- 2017, Elias Portolu (edizione critica ed.). Filologia della letteratura degli italiani, Sassari: EDES. 2017. ISBN 9788860254078.
- 2024m Dino Manca (a cura di), Elias Portolu, nuova edizione critica, in Appendice: edizione genetica Da Gli scherzi di zia Morte a Jest of death di Grazia Deledda. Dal manoscritto conservato nella Biblioteca Nazionale Centrale di Roma all’edizione newyorkese del 1906 Centro Studi Grazia Deledda – ISRE, Nuoro-Cagliari, Edizioni ISRE-BNCR / Aipsa, 2024, pp. 320.

== English edition ==
- Elias Portolu. Translated by Martha King. Evanston (Illinois): Northwestern university press. 1995. ISBN 0810112515.

== French edition ==
- Elias Portolu. Litteratures (in French). Translated by Léa Fazer. Parigi: Autrement. 1996. ISBN 2862606758.

== Russian edition ==
- Элиас Портолю / Elias Portolu (in Russian). Translated by S. S. Prokopovic. 2000.

== Portuguese edition ==
- As indecisões de Elias Portòlu. Le grazie (in Portuguese). Translated by Rafael Ferreira da Silva. Ghilarza: NOR Edizioni. 2018. ISBN 9788833090337.

== Sardinian edition ==
- Elias Portolu. Le grazie (in Sardinian). Translated by Giovanni Muroni. Ghilarza: NOR Edizioni. 2018. ISBN 9788833090290.

== Bibliography ==
- Carlo Mariotti (1903). "Elias Portolu, romanzo di Grazia Deledda". Cagliari. p. 11 – via Biblioteca dell'Istituto superiore regionale etnografico – Nuoro – NU.
- Dino Manca, Deledda tra due lingue. Genesi ed evoluzione di un romanzo, «StEFI» Studi di erudizione e di filologia italiana, IV, Roma, Edizioni Spolia, 2015, pp. 167–231.
- Alessandra Cattani, Grazia Deledda e la Russia. Riflessioni letterarie e linguistiche sulla traduzione russa di Elias Portolu, FrancoAngeli, 2023.
- Dino Manca, Introduzione a Elias Portolu, nuova edizione critica a c. di D. Manca, Centro Studi Grazia Deledda – ISRE, Nuoro-Cagliari, Edizioni ISRE-BNCR / Aipsa, 2024, pp. IX-CIX.
