= Grazia Deledda =

Italian writer (1871–1936)

- Gràssia Deledda; Gràtzia Deledda
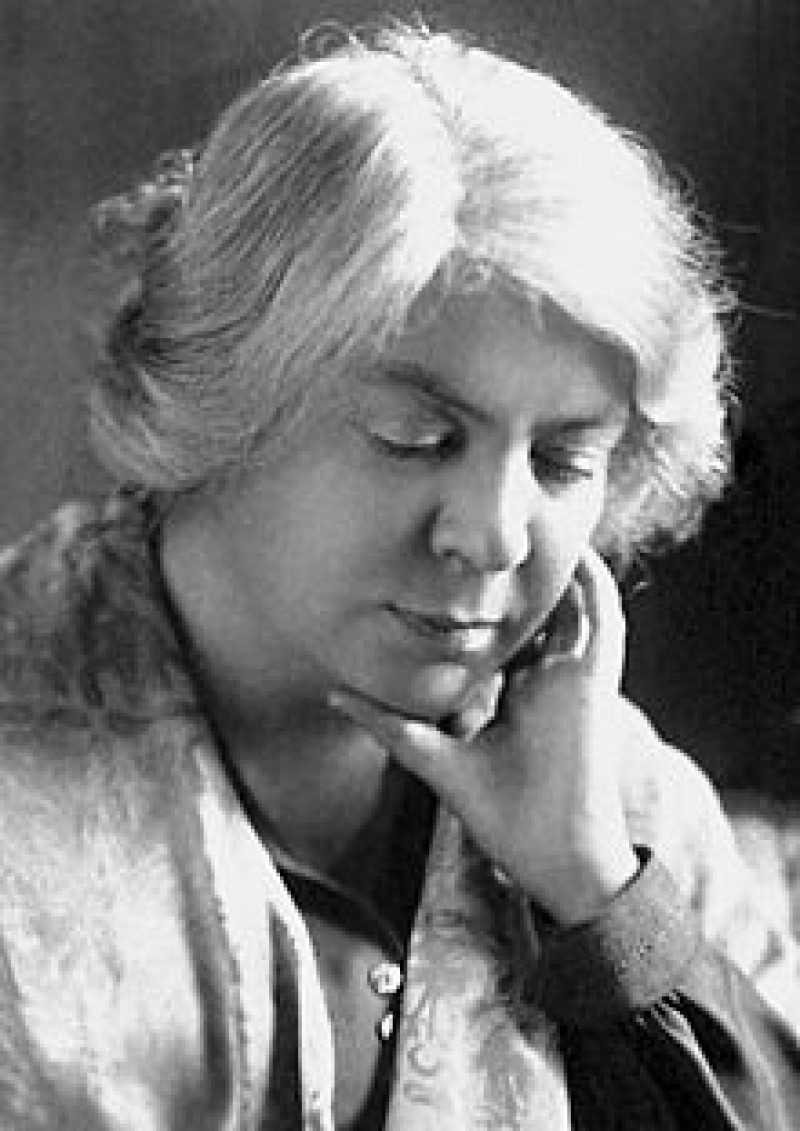
- Deledda in 1926
- Born: Grazia Maria Cosima Damiana Deledda; 27 September 1871; Nuoro, Sardinia, Kingdom of Italy
- Died: 15 August 1936 (aged 64); Rome, Lazio, Kingdom of Italy
- Occupations: Writer, novelist
- Spouse: Palmiro Madesani (m. 1900)
- Children: 2
- Writing career
- Notable awards: Nobel Prize in Literature; 1926
- Movements: Verismo, Decadence

Signature
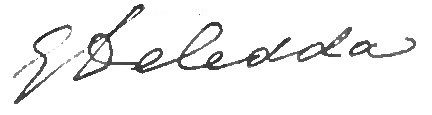

Grazia Maria Cosima Damiana Deledda (Italian: [ˈɡrattsja deˈlɛdda]; Sardinian: Gràssia or Gràtzia Deledda [ˈɡɾa(t)si.a ðɛˈlɛɖːa]; 27 September 1871 – 15 August 1936) was an Italian writer who received the Nobel Prize for Literature in 1926 "for her idealistically inspired writings which with plastic clarity picture the life on her native island [i.e. Sardinia] and with depth and sympathy deal with human problems in general". She was the first Italian woman to receive the prize, and only the second woman in general after Selma Lagerlöf was awarded hers in 1909.

== Biography ==
Deledda was born in Nuoro, Sardinia, into a middle-class family, to Giovanni Antonio Deledda and Francesca Cambosu, as the fourth of seven siblings. She attended elementary school (the minimum required at the time) and was then educated by a private tutor (a guest of one of her relatives) and moved on to study literature on her own. It was during this time that she started displaying an interest in writing short novels, mostly inspired by the life of Sardinian peasants and their struggles. Her teacher encouraged her to submit her writing to a newspaper and, at age 13, her first story was published in a local journal. Some of Deledda's early works were published in the fashion magazine L'ultima moda between 1888 and 1889. In 1890 Trevisani published Nell'azzurro (Into the Blue), her first collection of short stories. Deledda's main focus was the representation of poverty and the struggles associated with it through a combination of imaginary and autobiographical elements. Her family wasn't particularly supportive of her desire to write.

Deledda's first novel, Fior di Sardegna (Flower of Sardinia) was published in 1892. Her 1896 book Paesaggi sardi, published by Speirani, is characterized by a prose informed by both fiction and poetry. Around this time Deledda initiated a regular collaboration with newspapers and magazines, most notably La Sardegna, Piccola Rivista and Nuova Antologia. Her work earned significant visibility as well as critical interest. In October 1899, Deledda met Palmiro Madesani, a functionary of the Ministry of Finance, in Cagliari. Madesani and Deledda were married in 1900 and the couple moved to Rome right after the publication of Deledda's Il vecchio della montagna (The Old Man from the Mountain, 1900). Despite the birth of her two sons, Sardus (1901) and Francesco "Franz" (1904), Deledda managed to continue to write prolifically, publishing about a novel a year.

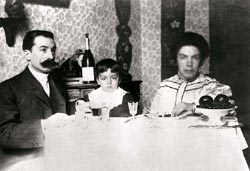
Deledda with her husband Palmiro and son Sardus, Rome, circa 1904

In 1903 she published Elias Portolu, which was met with commercial and critical success, boosting her reputation as a writer. This was followed by Cenere (Ashes, 1904); L'edera (The Ivy, 1908); Sino al confine (To the Border, 1910); Colombi e sparvieri (Doves and Sparrows, 1912); and her most popular book, Canne al vento (Reeds in the Wind, 1913).

In 1916 Cenere was the inspiration for a silent movie with famed Italian actress Eleonora Duse. It was the first and only time that Duse, a theatre performer, appeared in a film. Deledda was one of the contributors of the nationalist women's magazine, Lidel, which was established in 1919.

In 1926 Henrik Schück, a member of the Swedish Academy, nominated Deledda for the Nobel Prize in Literature. Deledda won "for her idealistically inspired writings which with plastic clarity picture the life on her native island and with depth and sympathy deal with human problems in general." She was awarded the Prize in a ceremony in Stockholm in 1926. Her initial response to the news was "Già?" ("Already?")

Deledda's win contributed to an increase in popularity of her writing. Benito Mussolini, who had just consolidated his grip on power, sent Deledda a signed portrait of himself with a dedication where he expressed his "profound admiration" for the writer. Flocks of journalists and photographers started visiting her home in Rome. Deledda initially welcomed them but eventually grew tired of the attention. One day she noticed that her beloved pet crow, Checca, was visibly irritated by the commotion, with people constantly coming in and out of the house. "If Checca has had enough, so have I," Deledda was quoted as saying, and she returned to a more retired routine. The events also put a strain on Deledda's extremely methodical writing schedule. Her day would start with a late breakfast, followed by a morning of hard reading, lunch, a quick nap and a few hours of writing before dinner.

Deledda continued to write even as she grew older and more fragile. Her subsequent works, La Casa del Poeta (The House of the Poet, 1930) and Sole d'Estate (Summer Sun, 1933), indicate a more optimistic view of life even as she was experiencing serious health issues.

Deledda died in Rome at the age of 64 of breast cancer. La chiesa della solitudine (The Church of Solitude, 1936), Deledda's last novel, is a semi-autobiographical depiction of a young Italian woman coming to terms with a fatal disease. A completed manuscript of the novel Cosima was discovered after her death and published posthumously in 1937.

== Accolades ==
Deledda's work has been highly regarded by writers of Italian literature, including Luigi Capuana, Giovanni Verga, Enrico Thovez, Pietro Pancrazi, Renato Serra. Sardinian writers including Sergio Atzeni, Giulio Angioni and Salvatore Mannuzzu, were greatly influenced by her work, prompting them to found what has later become known as the Sardinian Literary Spring. In 1947 artist Amelia Camboni was commissioned a portrait of Deledda, currently standing close to her home in Rome in the Pincio neighbourhood.

Deledda's birthplace and childhood home in Nuoro was declared a national heritage building and purchased in 1968 by the Municipality of Nuoro, which in 1979 handed it over to the Regional Ethnographic Institute (ISRE) for the symbolic price of 1,000 Italian Lire. The Institute transformed the house into a museum commemorating the writer, and it's now called the Museo Deleddiano. The museum consists of ten rooms showcasing the most important episodes in Deledda's life.

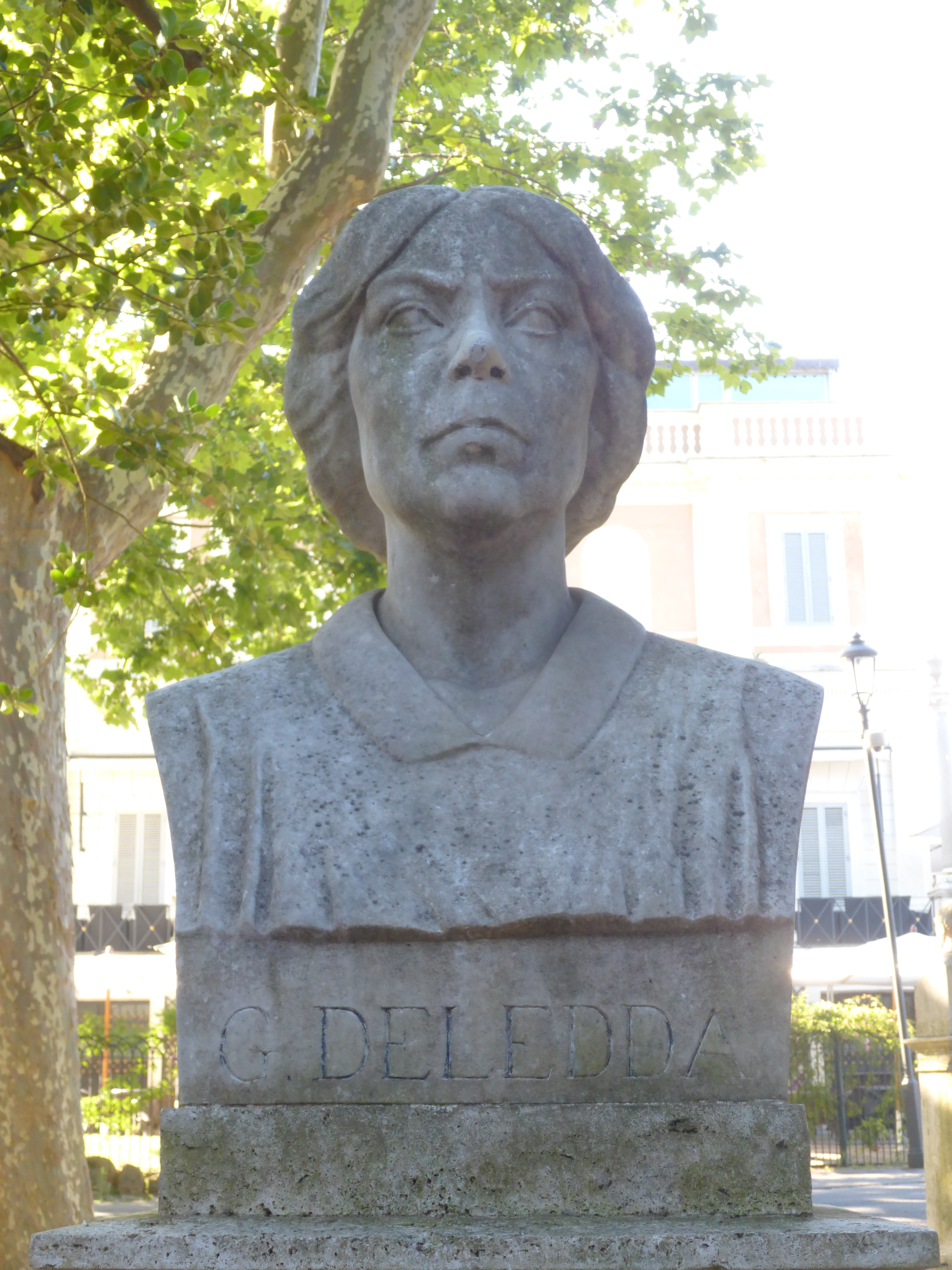
Bust of Grazia Deledda by Amelia Camboni, Pincio, Rome

A coal power plant opened in Portoscuso in 1965. As of 2013, this powerplant called Grazia Deledda has a capacity of 590 MW.

Tribute

On 10 December 2017 Google celebrated her with a Google Doodle.

== Work ==
The life, customs, and traditions of the Sardinian people are prominent in Deledda's writing. She often relies on detailed geographical descriptions and her characters often present a strong connection with their place of origins. Many of her characters are outcasts who silently struggle with isolation. Overall Deledda's work focuses on love, pain and death, upon which rest feelings of sin and fatality. Her novels tend to criticize social values and moral norms rather than the people who are victims of such circumstances. In her work the influence of the verism of Giovanni Verga and, sometimes, also that of the decadentism of Gabriele D'Annunzio is evident, although her writing style is not so ornate. Despite her groundbreaking role in Italian and world literature, Deledda has not been considered a feminist writer, possibly due to her tendency to depict women's pain and suffering as opposed to women's autonomy.

== Complete list of works ==
Below is a complete list of Deledda's works:

- Stella d'Oriente (1890)
- Nell'azzuro (1890)
- Fior di Sardegna (1892) (English translation: Flower of Sardinia, 2026)
- Racconti sardi (1894)
- Tradizioni popolari di Nuoro in Sardegna (1894)
- La via del male (1896)
- Anime oneste (1895)
- Paesaggi sardi (1897)
- La tentazioni (1899)
- Il tesoro (1897)
- L'ospite (1897)
- La giustizia (1899)
- Nostra Signora del buon consiglio: leggenda sarda (1899)
- Le disgrazie che può causare il denaro (1899)
- Il Vecchio della montagna (1900)
- Dopo il divorzio (1902; English translation: After the Divorce, 1905)
- La regina delle tenebre (1902)
- Elias Portolu (1900)
- Cenere (1904; English translation: Ashes (1908) by Helen Hester Colvill)
- Odio Vince (1904)
- Nostalgie (1905); English translation: Nostalgia, by Helen Hester Colvill
- L'ombra del passato (1907)
- Amori moderni (1907)
- L'edera (1908), English translation as Ivy by Mary Ann Frese Witt and Martha Witt (2019)
- Il nonno (1908), English translation of the short story "Il ciclamino" as "The Cyclamen" by Maria Di Salvatore and Pan Skordos, in "Journal of Italian Translation", Volume XIV, Number 1, Spring 2019
- Il nostro padrone (1910)
- Sino al confine (1910)
- I giuochi della vita (1911)
- Nel deserto (1911)
- L'edera: dramma in tre atti (1912)
- Colombi e sparvieri (1912)
- Chiaroscuro (1912)
- Canne al vento (1913), Reeds in the Wind (1999 English translation by Martha King)
- Le colpe altrui (1914)
- Marianna Sirca (1915); English translation: Marianna Sirca, by Graham Anderson (2023)
- Il fanciullo nascosto (1915)
- L'incendio nell'oliveto (1918)
- Il ritorno del figlio (1919)
- Naufraghi in porto (1920)
- La madre (1920; English translation: The Woman and the Priest, 1922; English translation: The Mother, by Mary G. Steegman, 1923; English translation: The Mother, by Martha Witt & Mary Ann Frese Witt, 2025)
- Il segreto dell'uomo solitario (1921)
- Cattive compagnie: novelle (1921)
- La grazia (1921)
- Il Dio dei viventi (1922)
- Silvio Pellico (1923)
- Il flauto nel bosco (1923)
- La danza della collana (1924); English translation: The Dance of the Necklace, by Mary Ann Frese Witt & Martha Witt, 2023)
- A sinistra (1924)
- La fuga in Egitto (1925)
- Il sigillo d'amore (1926)
- Annalena Bilsini (1927)
- Il vecchio e i fanciulli (1928)
- Il dono di natale (1930)
- La casa del poeta (1930)
- Eugenia Grandet, Onorato di Balzac (1930)
- Il libro della terza classe elementare: letture, religione, storia, geografia, aritmetica (1931)
- Giaffa: racconti per ragazzi (1931)
- Il paese del vento (1931)
- Sole d'estate (1933)
- L'argine (1934)
- La chiesa della solitudine (1936); English translation by E. Ann Matter, The Church of Solitude (University of New York Press, 2002)
- Cosima (1937) published posthumously, English translation by Martha King (1988)
- Il cedro del Libano (1939) published posthumously
- Grazia Deledda: premio Nobel per la letteratura 1926 (1966)
- Opere scelte (1968)
- Letter inedite di Grazia Deledda ad Arturo Giordano direttore della rivista letteraria (Alchero: Nemaprress, 2004)

== See also ==
- List of female Nobel laureates

== Bibliography ==
- Attilio Momigliano, "Intorno a Grazia Deledda", in Ultimi studi, La Nuova Italia, Florence, 1954.
- Emilio Cecchi, "Grazia Deledda", in Storia della Letteratura Italiana: Il Novecento, Garzanti, Milan, 1967.
- Antonio Piromalli, "Grazia Deledda", La Nuova Italia, Florence, 1968.
- Natalino Sapegno, "Prefazione", in Romanzi e novelle, Mondadori, Milan, 1972.
- Giulio Angioni, "Grazia Deledda: l'antropologia positivistica e la diversità della Sardegna", in Grazia Deledda nella cultura contemporanea, Satta, Nuoro, 1992
- Giulio Angioni, "Introduzione", in Tradizioni popolari di Nuoro, Ilisso, Biblioteca Sarda, Nuoro, 2010.
- "Museo Deleddiano di Nuoro" (in Italian). Fidelity Viaggi. 5 February 2015.
- Garwood, Duncan (2009). Sardinia. Lonely Planet. p. 193. ISBN 978-1741048193.
- Onnis, Omar; Mureddu, Manuelle (2019). Illustres. Vita, morte e miracoli di quaranta personalità sarde (in Italian). Sestu: Domus de Janas. ISBN 978-88-97084-90-7. OCLC 1124656644.
