= 1975 Nobel Prize in Literature =

- Eugenio Montale
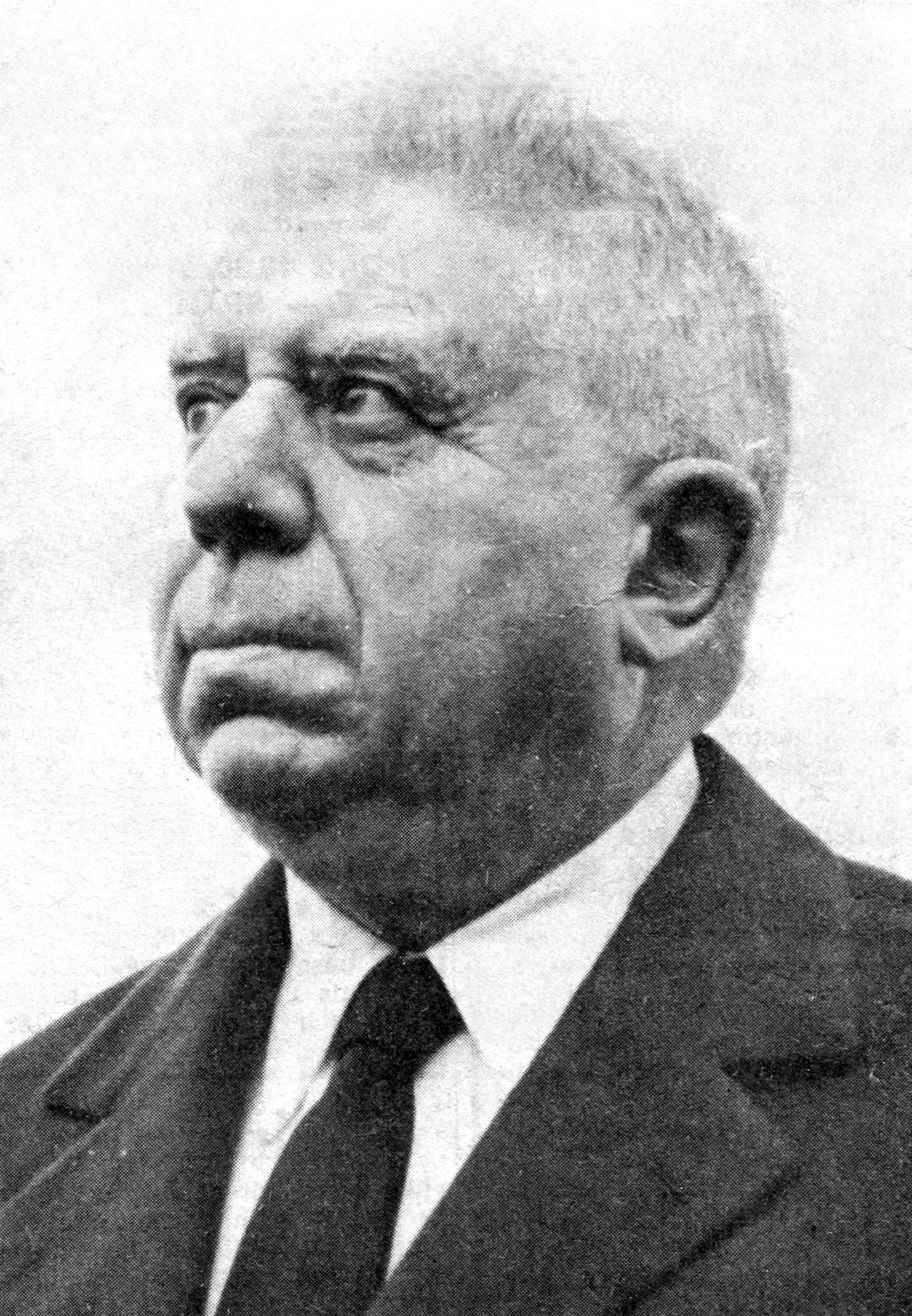
- "for his distinctive poetry which, with great artistic sensitivity, has interpreted human values under the sign of an outlook on life with no illusions"
- Date: 23 October 1975 (announcement); 10 December 1975 (ceremony)
- Location: Stockholm, Sweden
- Presented by: Swedish Academy
- First award: 1901
- Website: Official website

The 1975 Nobel Prize in Literature was awarded to the Italian poet Eugenio Montale (1896–1981) "for his distinctive poetry which, with great artistic sensitivity, has interpreted human values under the sign of an outlook on life with no illusions". He is the fifth Italian laureate for the literature prize.

== Laureate ==
Along with Giuseppe Ungaretti and Salvatore Quasimodo, Eugenio Montale is associated with the poetic school of hermeticsm, the Italian variant of the French symbolism movement, although Montale himself did not consider himself to be part of the hermetic school. His poetry is often compared to T. S. Eliot. When the Swedish Academy awarded him with the Nobel Prize in 1975, they called him “one of the most important poets of the contemporary West”. His notable oeuvres include Ossi di seppia ("Cuttlefish Bones", 1925), Le occasioni ("The Occasions", 1939), La bufera e altro ("The Storm and Other Things", 1956), Satura (1962–1970) (1971) and Diario del '71 e del '72 (1973).

== Deliberations ==
=== Nominations ===
Montale was first nominated for the prize in 1955 by Nobel laureate T. S. Eliot. It was followed in 1961 and from 1966 he became a regular nominee. By 1974, the Nobel committee had received 27 nominations in total before Montale was eventually awarded.

In 1975, the Swedish Academy received nominations for 114 writers with 22 being from the Nobel Committee itself. Twenty-eight of the nominees were new recommendations such Chinua Achebe, Fernand Braudel, Dobrica Ćosić, Miloš Crnjanski, Mohammed Dib, Gabriel García Márquez (awarded in 1982), Wilson Harris, Masuji Ibuse, Tove Jansson, Naguib Mahfouz (awarded in 1988), Desanka Maksimović, Vasko Popa, Chaim Potok and Mary Renault. The oldest nominee was Estonian poet Marie Under (aged 92) and the youngest was the Irish poet Brendan Kennelly (aged 39). Since the establishment of the awarded, 1975 became the highest number of female contenders in a year with 13 nominees: Anna Banti, Simone de Beauvoir, Doris Lessing (awarded in 2007), Nadine Gordimer (awarded in 1991), Tove Jansson, Rina Lasnier, Desanka Maksimović, Kamala Markandaya, Victoria Ocampo, Mary Renault, Nathalie Sarraute, Anna Seghers and Marie Under.

The authors Peter Anson, Hannah Arendt, Mikhail Bakhtin, Kersti Bergroth, Arthur Herbert Dodd, Julian Huxley, Edward Hyams, Murray Leinster, Constance Malleson, Thomas H. Parry-Williams, Kate Seredy, Robert Cedric Sherriff, Sydney Goodsir Smith, Ivan Sokolov-Mikitov, Elizabeth Taylor and P. G. Wodehouse died in 1975 without having been nominated for the prize.

Official list of nominees and their nominators for the prize
No.	Nominee	Country	Nominator(s)	Country
1	Chinua Achebe (1930-2013)	Nigeria	Clifford Hanley (1922-1999)	Scotland
2	Rafael Alberti (1902-1999)	Spain	Nobel Committee	Sweden
3	Vicente Aleixandre (1898–1984)	Spain	Juan Villegas Morales (1934–)	United States
3	Vicente Aleixandre (1898–1984)	Spain	11 other professors of University of California, Irvine	United States
3	Vicente Aleixandre (1898–1984)	Spain	Philip Warnock Silver (1932–2020)	United States
3	Vicente Aleixandre (1898–1984)	Spain	14 other professors of Columbia University	United States
3	Vicente Aleixandre (1898–1984)	Spain	Herb Jones (–)	United States
3	Vicente Aleixandre (1898–1984)	Spain	Robert Felkel (–)	United States
3	Vicente Aleixandre (1898–1984)	Spain	James Semelroth (–)	United States
3	Vicente Aleixandre (1898–1984)	Spain	Elsa Fanjul Alvarez (1938–)	Cuba; United States
3	Vicente Aleixandre (1898–1984)	Spain	Mercedes Ramírez Cárdenas (1914–2007)	Cuba; United States
3	Vicente Aleixandre (1898–1984)	Spain	John Dowling (1920–2009)	United States
3	Vicente Aleixandre (1898–1984)	Spain	Manuel Ramirez (1914–1984)	United States
3	Vicente Aleixandre (1898–1984)	Spain	Ralph de Gorog (1922–2006)	United States
3	Vicente Aleixandre (1898–1984)	Spain	Ruth Lundelius (1931–)	United States
3	Vicente Aleixandre (1898–1984)	Spain	Manuel Mantero (1930–2024)	Spain; United States
3	Vicente Aleixandre (1898–1984)	Spain	Henryk Ziomek (1922–2018)	Poland; United States
3	Vicente Aleixandre (1898–1984)	Spain	John Kelly Walsh (1930–2011)	United States
3	Vicente Aleixandre (1898–1984)	Spain	Samuel Jackson Cartledge (1935–2006)	United States
3	Vicente Aleixandre (1898–1984)	Spain	Oswaldo Arana (1925–2015)	Peru; United States
3	Vicente Aleixandre (1898–1984)	Spain	Daniel Brondi (1938–2019)	United States
3	Vicente Aleixandre (1898–1984)	Spain	Walter Kline (1923–1995)	United States
3	Vicente Aleixandre (1898–1984)	Spain	Leon Gilbert (–)	United States
3	Vicente Aleixandre (1898–1984)	Spain	Stephen Vasari (1921–2006)	United States
3	Vicente Aleixandre (1898–1984)	Spain	Jacqueline Kiraithe (–)	United States
3	Vicente Aleixandre (1898–1984)	Spain	Ervie Peña (1934–)	United States
3	Vicente Aleixandre (1898–1984)	Spain	Damaso Alonso (1898-1990)	Spain
4	Louis Aragon (1897–1982)	France	Michel Cadot (1926–2022)	France
5	Riccardo Bacchelli (1891–1985)	Italy	Giovanni Nencioni (1911–2008)	Italy
5	Riccardo Bacchelli (1891–1985)	Italy	Enrico Cerulli (1898–1988)	Italy
6	Anna Banti (1895-1985)	Italy	Gustavo Costa (1930–2012)	Italy
7	Saul Bellow (1915–2005)	Canada; United States	Nobel Committee	Sweden
8	Louis Paul Boon (1912–1979)	Belgium	A. Backx (–)	Netherlands
8	Louis Paul Boon (1912–1979)	Belgium	Albert Bontridder (1921–2015)	Belgium
8	Louis Paul Boon (1912–1979)	Belgium	Gerrit Borgers (1917–1987)	Netherlands
8	Louis Paul Boon (1912–1979)	Belgium	Wim Hazeu (1940–2024)	Netherlands
8	Louis Paul Boon (1912–1979)	Belgium	Bernard Kemp (1926–1980)	Belgium
9	Johan Borgen (1902–1979)	Norway	Eyvind Johnson (1900–1976)	Sweden
10	Jorge Luis Borges (1899–1986)	Argentina	Luis Droguett Alfaro (1922–2014)	Chile
10	Jorge Luis Borges (1899–1986)	Argentina	Michel Cadot (1926–2022)	France
10	Jorge Luis Borges (1899–1986)	Argentina	Jónas Kristjánsson (1924–2014)	Iceland
10	Jorge Luis Borges (1899–1986)	Argentina	Aatos Ojala (1919–1987)	Finland
11	Fernand Braudel (1902–1985)	France	John Harold Plumb (1911–2001)	England
12	Elias Canetti (1905–1994)	Bulgaria; England	Manfred Durzak (1938–)	West Germany
13	Camilo José Cela (1916–2002)	Spain	Nobel Committee	Sweden
14	Aimé Césaire (1913–2008)	Martinique	Jeanne-Lydie Goré (1924–2017)	France
15	André Chamson (1900–1983)	France	Armand Lunel (1892–1977)	France
15	André Chamson (1900–1983)	France	Giannēs Koutsocheras (1904–1994)	Greece
15	André Chamson (1900–1983)	France	Henri Guiter (1909–1994)	France
15	André Chamson (1900–1983)	France	Guy Nairay (1914–1999)	France
16	René Char (1907–1988)	France	Henri Peyre (1901–1988)	France; United States
17	Sri Chinmoy (1931–2007)	India; United States	Willard Abraham (1938–1994)	United States
17	Sri Chinmoy (1931–2007)	India; United States	Karl Kroeber (1926–2009)	United States
17	Sri Chinmoy (1931–2007)	India; United States	Peter Pitzele (1942–)	United States
18	Dobrica Ćosić (1921–2014)	Serbia	Pavle Ivić (1924–1999)	Serbia
19	Miloš Crnjanski (1893–1977)	Hungary; Serbia	Miroslav Pantić (1926–2011)	Serbia
19	Miloš Crnjanski (1893–1977)	Hungary; Serbia	Pavle Ivić (1924–1999)	Serbia
19	Miloš Crnjanski (1893–1977)	Hungary; Serbia	Nikola Milošević (1929–2007)	Serbia
19	Miloš Crnjanski (1893–1977)	Hungary; Serbia	Miloslava Stojnić (–)	Serbia
20	Fazıl Hüsnü Dağlarca (1914–2008)	Turkey	Nobel Committee	Sweden
21	Simone de Beauvoir (1908-1986)	France	Per Wastberg (1933–)	Sweden
22	Malcolm de Chazal (1902–1981)	Mauritius	Camille de Rauville (1910–1986)	Mauritius
23	Mohammed Dib (1920–2003)	Algeria; France	Jeanne-Lydie Goré (1924–2017)	France
24	Lawrence Durrell (1912–1990)	England	Jacques Schwartz (1914–1992)	France
25	Friedrich Dürrenmatt (1921–1990)	Switzerland	Werner Betz (1912–1980)	West Germany
25	Friedrich Dürrenmatt (1921–1990)	Switzerland	Keijo Holsti (1932–1989)	Finland
25	Friedrich Dürrenmatt (1921–1990)	Switzerland	Herbert Penzl (1910–1995)	Austria; United States
25	Friedrich Dürrenmatt (1921–1990)	Switzerland	Holger Frykenstedt (1911–2003)	Sweden
26	Odysseas Elytis (1911–1996)	Greece	Nobel Committee	Sweden
27	Salvador Espriu (1913–1985)	Spain	Antoni Comas i Pujol (1931–1981)	Spain
28	James Thomas Farrell (1904–1979)	United States	Edgar Marquess Branch (1913–2006)	United States
28	James Thomas Farrell (1904–1979)	United States	Duane Schneider (1937–2012)	United States
29	Max Frisch (1911–1991)	Switzerland	Manfred Durzak (1938–)	West Germany
29	Max Frisch (1911–1991)	Switzerland	Karl Hyldgaard-Jensen (1917–1995)	Denmark; Sweden
29	Max Frisch (1911–1991)	Switzerland	Holger Frykenstedt (1911–2003)	Sweden
30	Gabriel García Márquez (1927–2014)	Colombia	Walter Ralph Johnson (1933–2024)	United States
31	William Golding (1911–1993)	England	Irma Koskenniemi (1936–)	Finland
32	Nadine Gordimer (1923–2014)	South Africa	Nobel Committee	Sweden
33	Günter Grass (1927–2015)	West Germany	Brian Rowley (1923–2013)	England
33	Günter Grass (1927–2015)	West Germany	Manfred Windfuhr (1930–)	West Germany
34	Julien Green (1900–1998)	France	Nobel Committee	Sweden
35	Graham Greene (1904–1991)	England	Walter Ralph Johnson (1933–2024)	United States
35	Graham Greene (1904–1991)	England	Esko Pennanen (1912–1990)	Finland
35	Graham Greene (1904–1991)	England	Victor Sawdon Pritchett (1900–1997)	England
35	Graham Greene (1904–1991)	England	Mary Renault (1905–1983)	England; South Africa
35	Graham Greene (1904–1991)	England	Hugh Macrae Richmond (1932–)	England
35	Graham Greene (1904–1991)	England	Herbert Morgan Waidson (1916–1988)	England
35	Graham Greene (1904–1991)	England	Wolfgang Weiss (1932–2019)	West Germany
36	Jean Guitton (1901–1999)	France	Charles Dédéyan (1910–2003)	France; Armenia
37	Okiuyama Gwyn (1920–1977)	India	Indra Bahadur Rai (1927–2018)	India
38	Paavo Haavikko (1931–2008)	Finland	Eeva Kilpi (1928–2026)	Finland
38	Paavo Haavikko (1931–2008)	Finland	Rauno Toivonen (1924–1999)	Finland
39	Wilson Harris (1921–2018)	Guyana	Joyce Sparer Adler (1915–1999)	United States
39	Wilson Harris (1921–2018)	Guyana	Jeanne Delbaere-Garant (–)	Belgium
39	Wilson Harris (1921–2018)	Guyana	Michel Fabre (1933–2007)	France
39	Wilson Harris (1921–2018)	Guyana	Robert Merle Farnsworth (1929–2022)	United States
39	Wilson Harris (1921–2018)	Guyana	Alexander Norman Jeffares (1920–2005)	Ireland
39	Wilson Harris (1921–2018)	Guyana	Arthur Ravenscroft (1924–1989)	England
39	Wilson Harris (1921–2018)	Guyana	Robert Thomas Robertson (1921–2010)	Canada
39	Wilson Harris (1921–2018)	Guyana	Anna Rutherford (1932–2001)	Australia; Denmark
39	Wilson Harris (1921–2018)	Guyana	Ivan Van Sertima (1935–2009)	Guyana; England
40	William Heinesen (1900–1991)	Faroe Islands	Hans Bekker-Nielsen (1933–2007)	Denmark
40	William Heinesen (1900–1991)	Faroe Islands	Peter Foote (1924–2009)	England
40	William Heinesen (1900–1991)	Faroe Islands	Walton Glyn Jones (1928–2014)	England
40	William Heinesen (1900–1991)	Faroe Islands	Jákup Jákupsstovu (1922–1976)	Denmark
40	William Heinesen (1900–1991)	Faroe Islands	Duncan Mennie (1909–1998)	England
41	Joseph Heller (1923–1999)	United States	Nobel Committee	Sweden
42	Vladimír Holan (1905–1980)	Czechoslovakia	Nobel Committee	Sweden
43	Hans Henrik Holm (1896–1980)	Norway	Olav Bø (1918–1998)	Norway
43	Hans Henrik Holm (1896–1980)	Norway	Kåre Langvik-Johannessen (1919–2014)	Norway
44	Masuji Ibuse (1898–1993)	Japan	Michel Cadot (1926–2022)	France
45	Gyula Illyés (1902–1983)	Hungary	Nobel Committee	Sweden
46	Eugène Ionesco (1909–1994)	Romania; France	Nobel Committee	Sweden
47	Mohammad-Ali Jamalzadeh (1892–1997)	Iran	Ehsan Yarshater (1920–2018)	Iran
48	Tove Jansson (1914–2001)	Finland	Eeva Kilpi (1928–2026)	Finland
48	Tove Jansson (1914–2001)	Finland	Kerstin Nyqvist (–)	Finland
49	Eugen Jebeleanu (1911–1991)	Romania	Miron Nicolescu (1903–1975)	Romania
49	Eugen Jebeleanu (1911–1991)	Romania	Ion Jalea (1887–1983)	Romania
49	Eugen Jebeleanu (1911–1991)	Romania	Corneliu Baba (1906–1997)	Romania
49	Eugen Jebeleanu (1911–1991)	Romania	Alexandru Philippide (1900–1979)	Romania
49	Eugen Jebeleanu (1911–1991)	Romania	Șerban Cioculescu (1902–1988)	Romania
49	Eugen Jebeleanu (1911–1991)	Romania	Alexandru Dima (1905–1979)	Romania
49	Eugen Jebeleanu (1911–1991)	Romania	Laurențiu Fulga (1916–1984)	Romania
50	Ferenc Juhász (1928–2015)	Hungary	Nobel Committee	Sweden
51	Yaşar Kemal (1923–2015)	Turkey	Raymond Williams (1921–1988)	Wales
51	Yaşar Kemal (1923–2015)	Turkey	Le Conseil Scientifique	France
52	Brendan Kennelly (1936–2021)	Ireland	John Brendan Keane (1928–2002)	Ireland
53	Wolfgang Koeppen (1906–1996)	West Germany	Hermann Kesten (1900–1996)	West Germany
54	Arthur Koestler (1905–1983)	Hungary; England	George Mikes (1912–1987)	Hungary; England
55	Miroslav Krleža (1893–1981)	Croatia	Mira Mihelič (1912–1985)	Slovenia
55	Miroslav Krleža (1893–1981)	Croatia	Miodrag Popović (1920–2005)	Serbia
55	Miroslav Krleža (1893–1981)	Croatia	Dušan Puhalo (1919–2006)	Serbia
55	Miroslav Krleža (1893–1981)	Croatia	Saša Vereš (1928–1992)	Croatia
55	Miroslav Krleža (1893–1981)	Croatia	Nikola Milošević (1929–2007)	Serbia
55	Miroslav Krleža (1893–1981)	Croatia	Miloslava Stojnić (–)	Serbia
56	Mihailo Lalić (1914–1992)	Montenegro; Serbia	Pavle Ivić (1924–1999)	Serbia
56	Mihailo Lalić (1914–1992)	Montenegro; Serbia	Vida Marković (1916–2001)	Serbia
57	Rina Lasnier (1915–1997)	Canada	Andrée-Anne Charbonneau (–)	Canada
57	Rina Lasnier (1915–1997)	Canada	Robert Choquette (1905–1991)	Canada
58	Siegfried Lenz (1926–2014)	West Germany	Klaus Doderer (1925–2023)	West Germany
59	Doris Lessing (1919–2013)	Zimbabwe; England	Richard Murphey Goodwin (1913–1996)	United States
60	Väinö Linna (1920–1992)	Finland	Åke Hansson (–)	Finland
60	Väinö Linna (1920–1992)	Finland	Eeva Kilpi (1928–2026)	Finland
61	Robert Lowell (1917–1977)	United States	Hans Galinsky (1909–1991)	West Germany; United States
62	Hugh MacDiarmid (1892–1978)	Scotland	David Daiches (1912–2005)	Scotland
63	Józef Mackiewicz (1902–1985)	Poland	Jadwiga Maurer (1930–2012)	Poland
64	Naguib Mahfouz (1911–2006)	Egypt	Michel Cadot (1926–2022)	France
65	Norman Mailer (1923–2007)	United States	Nobel Committee	Sweden
66	Desanka Maksimović (1898–1993)	Serbia	Miljan Mojašević (1918–2002)	Serbia
67	Bernard Malamud (1914–1986)	United States	Nobel Committee	Sweden
68	André Malraux (1901–1976)	France	Inge Jonsson (1928–2020)	Sweden
68	André Malraux (1901–1976)	France	Jan Kott (1914–2001)	Poland
68	André Malraux (1901–1976)	France	Maija Lehtonen (1924–2015)	Finland
68	André Malraux (1901–1976)	France	Georges Matoré (1908–1998)	France
68	André Malraux (1901–1976)	France	Henri Peyre (1901–1988)	France; United States
68	André Malraux (1901–1976)	France	Laurent Versini (1932–2021)	France
68	André Malraux (1901–1976)	France	Michel Cadot (1926–2022)	France
69	Kamala Markandaya (1924–2004)	India; England	Horacio Serrano (1904–1980)	Chile
70	Segismundo Masel (1895–1985)	Argentina	Antonio de Tornes Ballesteros (–)	Argentina
71	Henri Michaux (1899–1984)	Belgium; France	Andri Peer (1921–1985)	Switzerland
71	Henri Michaux (1899–1984)	Belgium; France	Kazimir Geza Werner (1900–1985)	Hungary; West Germany
72	Eugenio Montale (1896–1981)	Italy	Umberto Limentani (1913–1989)	Italy
72	Eugenio Montale (1896–1981)	Italy	Henri Peyre (1901–1988)	France; United States
73	Giuseppe Morabito (1900–1997)	Italy	Giovanni Giraldi (1915–2014)	Italy
74	Federico Morador Otero (1897–1977)	Uruguay	Eduardo Payssé Reyes (1902–1986)	Uruguay
75	Alberto Moravia (1907–1990)	Italy	Per Wästberg (1933–)	Sweden
75	Alberto Moravia (1907–1990)	Italy	Jacques Robichez (1914–1999)	France
76	Vladimir Nabokov (1899–1977)	Russia; United States	Robert Alter (1935–)	United States
76	Vladimir Nabokov (1899–1977)	Russia; United States	Hans Bielenstein (1920–2015)	Sweden
76	Vladimir Nabokov (1899–1977)	Russia; United States	Harry Levin (1912–1994)	United States
76	Vladimir Nabokov (1899–1977)	Russia; United States	Franz Norbert Mennemeier (1924–2021)	West Germany
76	Vladimir Nabokov (1899–1977)	Russia; United States	Kirstin Michalski (–)	United States
76	Vladimir Nabokov (1899–1977)	Russia; United States	John Henry Raleigh (1920–2001)	United States
76	Vladimir Nabokov (1899–1977)	Russia; United States	Hans Rothe (1894–1977)	Germany
76	Vladimir Nabokov (1899–1977)	Russia; United States	Bernard Tervoort (1920–2006)	Netherlands
77	Mikhail Naimy (1889–1988)	Lebanon	Toufic Fahd (1923–2009)	Lebanon
78	V. S. Naipaul (1932–2018)	Trinidad and Tobago; England	Nobel Committee	Sweden
79	R. K. Narayan (1906–2001)	India	Suniti Kumar Chatterji (1890–1977)	India
79	R. K. Narayan (1906–2001)	India	K. R. Srinivasa Iyengar (1908–1999)	India
80	Victoria Ocampo (1890–1979)	Argentina	Fryda Schultz de Mantovani (1912–1978)	Argentina
81	Kenzaburō Ōe (1935–2023)	Japan	Nobel Committee	Sweden
82	Germán Pardo García (1902–1991)	Colombia; Mexico	Eduardo Guzmán Esponda (1889–1988)	Colombia
82	Germán Pardo García (1902–1991)	Colombia; Mexico	James Willis Robb (1918–2010)	United States
82	Germán Pardo García (1902–1991)	Colombia; Mexico	Estelle Irizarry (1937–2017)	United States
82	Germán Pardo García (1902–1991)	Colombia; Mexico	Oscar Abel Ligaluppi (1927–2000)	Argentina
83	Octavio Paz (1914–1998)	Mexico	Nobel Committee	Sweden
84	José María Pemán (1897–1981)	Spain	Manuel Halcón (1900–1989)	Spain
84	José María Pemán (1897–1981)	Spain	Antonio Iraizoz (1890–1976)	Cuba
84	José María Pemán (1897–1981)	Spain	Emeterio Barcelon (1897–1978)	Philippines
85	Harold Pinter (1930–2008)	England	Nobel Committee	Sweden
86	Vasko Popa (1922–1991)	Serbia	Nils Åke Nilsson (1917–1995)	Sweden
87	Chaim Potok (1929–2002)	United States	Nobel Committee	Sweden
88	Satya Prakasha 'Nirad' (–)	India	Y. K. Punj (–)	India
89	Zayn al-ʻĀbidīn Rahnamā (1894–1990)	Iran	Abbas Aryanpur-Kashani (1906–1985)	Iran
89	Zayn al-ʻĀbidīn Rahnamā (1894–1990)	Iran	Manouchehr Eghbal (1909–1977)	Iran
90	Mary Renault (1905–1983)	England; South Africa	Hugh Finn (1925–)	England; Zimbabwe
91	Yannis Ritsos (1909–1990)	Greece	Minas Savvas (1937–2025)	Greece; United States
92	Philip Roth (1933–2018)	United States	Nobel Committee	Sweden
93	Tadeusz Rózewicz (1921–2014)	Poland	Nils Åke Nilsson (1917–1995)	Sweden
93	Tadeusz Rózewicz (1921–2014)	Poland	Józef Trypućko (1910–1983)	Poland
94	Nathalie Sarraute (1900–1999)	France	Franz Norbert Mennemeier (1924–2021)	West Germany
95	Anna Seghers (1900–1983)	East Germany	Heinz Kamnitzer (1917–2001)	West Germany
96	Jaroslav Seifert (1901–1986)	Czechoslovakia	Ľubomír Ďurovič (1925–2022)	Slovakia
96	Jaroslav Seifert (1901–1986)	Czechoslovakia	Roman Jakobson (1896–1982)	Russia; United States
97	Meša Selimović (1910–1982)	Bosnia and Herzegovina; Serbia	Milosav Babović (1921–1997)	Montenegro; Serbia
97	Meša Selimović (1910–1982)	Bosnia and Herzegovina; Serbia	Ivan Dimić (1921–2004)	Serbia
98	Léopold Sédar Senghor (1906–2001)	Senegal	Roger Asselineau (1915–2002)	France
98	Léopold Sédar Senghor (1906–2001)	Senegal	Alphonse Dupront (1905–1990)	France
98	Léopold Sédar Senghor (1906–2001)	Senegal	Jeanne-Lydie Goré (1924–2017)	France
99	Ignazio Silone (1900–1978)	Italy	Denis de Rougemont (1906–1985)	Switzerland
100	Claude Simon (1913–2005)	France	Tom Bishop (1929–2022)	United States
100	Claude Simon (1913–2005)	France	Malcolm Bradbury (1932–2000)	England
100	Claude Simon (1913–2005)	France	John Fletcher (1937–2025)	England
100	Claude Simon (1913–2005)	France	Haydn Trevor Mason (1929–2018)	England
101	Isaac Bashevis Singer (1902–1991)	Poland; United States	Lothar Kahn (1922–1990)	United States
101	Isaac Bashevis Singer (1902–1991)	Poland; United States	Harry Levin (1912–1994)	United States
101	Isaac Bashevis Singer (1902–1991)	Poland; United States	John Henry Raleigh (1920–2001)	United States
102	Manès Sperber (1905–1984)	Austria; France	Hermann Kesten (1900–1996)	West Germany
103	Abraham Sutzkever (1913–2010)	Belarus; Israel	Nobel Committee	Sweden
104	Pratap Narayan Tandon (1935–)	India	Kesari Narayan Shukla (–)	India
105	Miguel Torga (1907–1995)	Portugal	Hernâni Cidade (1887–1975)	Portugal
106	Marie Under (1883–1980)	Estonia	Asta Willmann (1916–1984)	Estonia
106	Marie Under (1883–1980)	Estonia	Ants Oras (1900–1982)	Estonia
107	Erico Verissimo (1905–1975)	Brazil	José Augusto César Salgado (1894–1979)	Brazil
108	Gerard Walschap (1898–1989)	Belgium	Maurice Gilliams (1900–1982)	Belgium
108	Gerard Walschap (1898–1989)	Belgium	Willem Pée (1903–1986)	Belgium
109	Mika Waltari (1908–1979)	Finland	Keijo Holsti (1932–1989)	Finland
110	Sándor Weöres (1913–1989)	Hungary	Áron Kibédi Varga (1930–2018)	Hungary; Netherlands
111	John Hall Wheelock (1886–1978)	United States	Charles Abraham Wagner (1898–1986)	United States
112	Elie Wiesel (1928–2016)	Romania; United States	Irving Abrahamson (1925–2022)	United States
112	Elie Wiesel (1928–2016)	Romania; United States	Marver Bernstein (1919–1990)	United States
112	Elie Wiesel (1928–2016)	Romania; United States	Albert Bowker (1919–2008)	United States
112	Elie Wiesel (1928–2016)	Romania; United States	Jules Brody (1928–2021)	United States
112	Elie Wiesel (1928–2016)	Romania; United States	Wolfgang Fleischmann (1928–)	United States
112	Elie Wiesel (1928–2016)	Romania; United States	Maurice Stanley Friedman (1921–2016)	United States
112	Elie Wiesel (1928–2016)	Romania; United States	Irving Greenberg (1933–)	United States
112	Elie Wiesel (1928–2016)	Romania; United States	Irving Halperin (1922–2000)	United States
112	Elie Wiesel (1928–2016)	Romania; United States	James McNaughton Hester (1924–2014)	United States
112	Elie Wiesel (1928–2016)	Romania; United States	Gerd Høst-Heyerdahl (1915–2007)	Norway
112	Elie Wiesel (1928–2016)	Romania; United States	Hans Juergensen (1919–2000)	United States
112	Elie Wiesel (1928–2016)	Romania; United States	Louis Lionel Kaplan (1902–2001)	United States
112	Elie Wiesel (1928–2016)	Romania; United States	Jack Kolbert (1927–2005)	United States
112	Elie Wiesel (1928–2016)	Romania; United States	Rosette Clementine Lamont (1927–2012)	United States
112	Elie Wiesel (1928–2016)	Romania; United States	Franklin Littell (1917–2009)	United States
112	Elie Wiesel (1928–2016)	Romania; United States	Robert Marshak (1916–1992)	United States
112	Elie Wiesel (1928–2016)	Romania; United States	André Neher (1914–1988)	France
112	Elie Wiesel (1928–2016)	Romania; United States	David Patterson (1922–2005)	England
112	Elie Wiesel (1928–2016)	Romania; United States	Robert Louis Payton (1926–2011)	United States
112	Elie Wiesel (1928–2016)	Romania; United States	John Silber (1926–2012)	United States
112	Elie Wiesel (1928–2016)	Romania; United States	David Weinstein (1908–1993)	United States
112	Elie Wiesel (1928–2016)	Romania; United States	Charles Edward Young (1931–2023)	United States
113	Angus Wilson (1913–1991)	England	Nicholas Brooke (1924–1998)	England
114	Carl Zuckmayer (1896–1977)	West Germany	Erich Ruprecht (1906–1997)	West Germany

== Prize decision ==
The members of the Nobel committee variously proposed Graham Greene, Saul Bellow (awarded in 1976), Doris Lessing (awarded in 2007) and Nadine Gordimer (awarded in 1991) as the recipients of the 1975 Nobel Prize in Literature, but struggled to agree on one candidate. A speech by Academy member and former Nobel committee member Henry Olsson on 25 September appears to have convinced the members of the Swedish Academy to agree on awarding the fifth shortlisted candidate, Eugenio Montale. As none of the committee members had placed him as their first proposal, Montale is said being a compromise second choice by the Swedish Academy.

== Reactions ==
According to the Associated Press, Montale said that award had overwhelmed him and made his life, "which was always unhappy, less unhappy."

In Italy, the awarding of the Nobel Prize to Montale was positively received. Their Prime Minister, Aldo Moro, congratulated him, said that the award "consecrates the validity of your poetical and human message, and, in you, honors the Italian culture," and President Giovanni Leone commented that his work's contained "tormented and lucid singling‐out of the anxieties and the aspirations of modern man."

== Award ceremony ==
At the award ceremony on 10 December 1975, Anders Österling of the Swedish Academy said:

"at his best Montale, with strict discipline, has attained a refined artistry, at once personal and objective, in which every word fills its place as precisely as the glass cube in a coloured mosaic. The linguistic laconicism cannot be carried any further; every trace of embellishment and jingle has been cleared away. When, for instance, in the remarkable portrait-poem of the Jewes Dora Markus, he wants to indicate the current background of time, he does so in five words: Distilla veleno una fede feroce (“A fierce faith distils poison”). In such masterpieces both the fateful perspective and the ingeniously concentrated structure are reminiscent of T.S. Eliot and “The Waste Land”, but Montale is unlikely to have received impulses from this quarter and his development has, if anything, followed a parallel path"

== Nobel lecture ==
Eugenio Montale delivered his Nobel lecture on 12 December 1975. Entitled "Is Poetry Still Possible?", he spoke about the art of poetry and poetry's place in the modern world of mass communication.
