= 1974 Nobel Prize in Literature =

- Eyvind Johnson and Harry Martinson
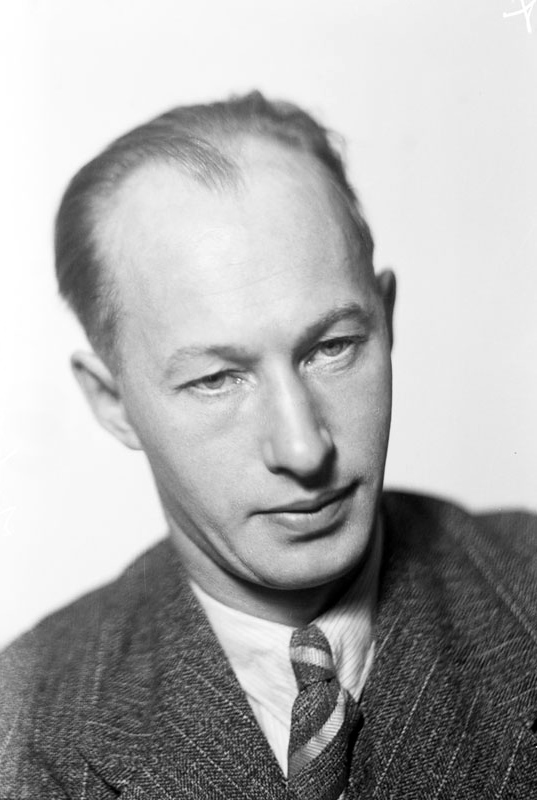
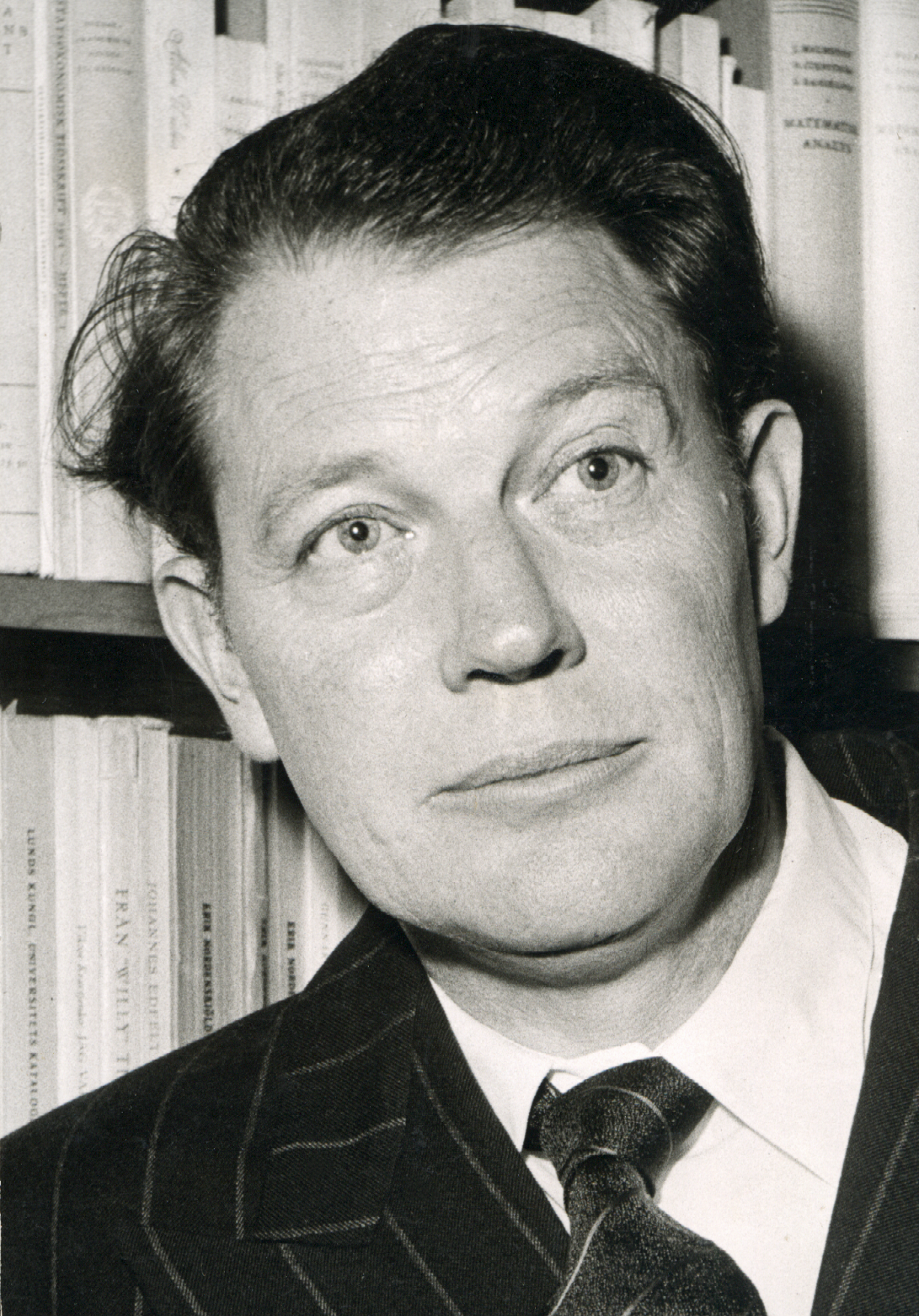
- Johnson "for a narrative art, farseeing in lands and ages, in the service of freedom," and Martinson "for writings that catch the dewdrop and reflect the cosmos."
- Date: 3 October 1974 (announcement); 10 December 1974 (ceremony)
- Location: Stockholm, Sweden
- Presented by: Swedish Academy
- First award: 1901
- Website: Official website

The 1974 Nobel Prize in Literature was awarded jointly to Swedish authors Eyvind Johnson (1900–1976) "for a narrative art, farseeing in lands and ages, in the service of freedom" and Harry Martinson (1904–1978) "for writings that catch the dewdrop and reflect the cosmos." The winners were announced in October 1974 by Karl Ragnar Gierow, permanent secretary of the Swedish Academy, and later sparked heavy criticisms from the literary world.

At the award ceremony on 10 December 1974, Karl Ragnar Gierow of the Swedish Academy said that Johnson and Martinson

"are representative of the many proletarian writers or working-class poets who, on a wide front, broke into our literature, not to ravage and plunder, but to enrich it with their fortunes. Their arrival meant an influx of experience and creative energy, the value of which can hardly be exaggerated."

It is the fourth (after 1904, 1917, and 1966), and as of yet last, occasion when the Nobel Prize in Literature has been shared between two individuals.

== Laureates ==
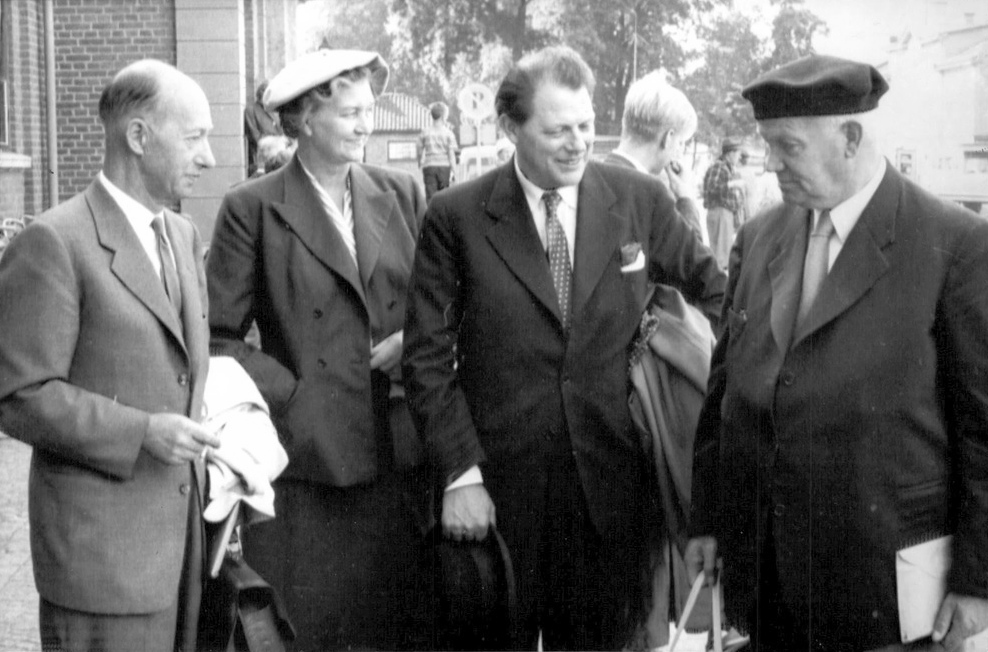
Eyvind Johnson and Harry Martinson with author Gabriel Jönsson and his wife Annicka Jönsson, at a writers' meeting in 1958.

=== Eyvind Johnson ===
Individual, moral, societal, and political issues are the recurring themes in Eyvind Johnson's literary works. De fyra främlingarna ("The Four Strangers"), a collection of short stories, served as his literary debut in 1924. Romanen om Olof ("The Novel about Olof"), his four autobiographical novels that appeared between 1934 and 1937, is regarded as one of his most important works. In the trilogy about Krilon (1941–1943), in which the world is represented allegorically, he took a strong stand against fascism and nazism of his day. His other famous works include Strändernas svall ("Return to Ithaca", 1946), Drömmar om rosor och eld ("Dreams of Roses and Fire", 1949), and Hans nådes tid ("The Days of His Grace", 1960).

=== Harry Martinson ===
The poetry and prose by Harry Martinson are both written in a unique and passionate style. His experiences as a young seaman and hobo, as well as his difficult and unloving childhood, are among the themes. He cares much about nature and is interested in science, which is reflected in his philosophical views and depictions of the natural world. Martinson's most well-known composition, the Aniara poetry collection from 1956, tells the story of a spaceship that departs from Earth following a horrific nuclear war but subsequently deviates from its intended path. His other notable works include Kap Farväl ("Cape Farewell", 1933), Nässlorna blomma ("Flowering Nettle", 1935), and Vägen till Klockrike ("The Road", 1948).

== Deliberations ==
=== Nominations ===
Eyvind Johnson was first nominated for the prize in 1962 and then every year until 1971. During this period Johnson declined to be considered for the prize as he himself was a member of the Swedish Academy's Nobel committee (he resigned from the committee in 1972). Harry Martinson was first nominated in 1964, and had by 1973 been nominated twelve times by six different nominators. In 1965, Nobel committee member Erik Lindegren suggested the idea of a shared prize to the two authors: "They are really the opposite of everything provinsional."

In the early 1970s Johnson and Martinson were nominated individually for the prize by their colleague in the Swedish Academy, the 1951 Nobel Prize laureate Pär Lagerkvist, and Nobel committee member Henry Olsson nominated them for a shared prize in 1970. In 1974 Johnson and Martinson were nominated by Academy members Johannes Edfelt and Pär Lagerkvist, and Johnson also by three other external nominators. Nobel committee member Artur Lundkvist however strongly opposed that the Academy should award the Nobel prize to its own members and had in 1972 stated that the Academy should "think very carefully" before awarding a Swedish author. In his memoirs, committee member Lars Gyllensten claimed that Johnson and Martinson had been proposed from outside the Academy and justified the decision to award them, arguing that "The consequence of principally excluding members of the Academy as prize candidates would mean that the Academy could only elect second rate authors."

In total, the Nobel Committee received nominations for 101 writers, same amount of nominees as the preceding year. Twenty-two authors were first-time nominees, among them Rafael Alberti, Gwen Bristow, Kamala Surayya-Das, Ralph Ellison, Armand Gatti, Uwe Johnson, Herbert Marcuse, Czesław Miłosz (awarded in 1980), R. K. Narayan, Octavio Paz (awarded in 1990), Francis Ponge, Kenzaburō Ōe (awarded in 1994), Harold Pinter (awarded in 2005), Stephen Spender, Antonio Buero Vallejo and Louise Weiss. The highest number of nominations was for Jewish author Elie Wiesel (awarded the 1986 Nobel Peace Prize). The oldest nominee was Estonian poet Marie Under (aged 91). Ten of the nominees were women namely Gwen Bristow, Chen Min-hwa, Kamala Surayya-Das, Argentina Diaz Lozano, Nadine Gordimer (awarded in 1991), Doris Lessing (awarded in 2007), Astrid Lindgren, Victoria Ocampo, Marie Under and Louise Weiss – the highest number of female contenders in a year.

The authors Martin Armstrong, Herbert Ernest Bates, Buddhadeva Bose, Emma L. Brock, Carl Jacob Burckhardt, Arthur J. Burks, Rosario Castellanos, Cyril Connolly, Julius Evola, Marieluise Fleißer, Georgette Heyer, David Jones, Margaret Leech, María de la O Lejárraga, Lois Lenski, Eric Linklater, Walter Lippmann, Sigurður Nordal, Howard Pease, Olive Higgins Prouty, Maria Ossowska, Anne Sexton, Jacqueline Susann, Jan Tschichold, Herman Van Breda and Victor E. van Vriesland died in 1974 without having been nominated for the prize.

Official list of nominees and their nominators for the prize
No.	Nominee	Country	Nominator(s)	Country
1	Rafael Alberti (1902–1999)	Spain	Johannes Edfelt (1904–1997)	Sweden
2	Vicente Aleixandre (1898–1984)	Spain	Dámaso Alonso (1898–1990)	Spain
2	Vicente Aleixandre (1898–1984)	Spain	Wolfgang Fleischmann (1928–1987)	United States
2	Vicente Aleixandre (1898–1984)	Spain	Norman Fulton (–)	United States
2	Vicente Aleixandre (1898–1984)	Spain	professors from Montclair State University	United States
2	Vicente Aleixandre (1898–1984)	Spain	Emilio González López (1903–1991)	Spain
2	Vicente Aleixandre (1898–1984)	Spain	Alexander Szogyi (1929–2007)	United States
2	Vicente Aleixandre (1898–1984)	Spain	professors from Hunter College	United States
2	Vicente Aleixandre (1898–1984)	Spain	Pedro Laín Entralgo (1908–2001)	Spain
2	Vicente Aleixandre (1898–1984)	Spain	Rafael Lapesa (1908–2001)	Spain
2	Vicente Aleixandre (1898–1984)	Spain	Charles Wendell (1930–2015)	United States
2	Vicente Aleixandre (1898–1984)	Spain	professors from Kean University	United States
3	Riccardo Bacchelli (1891–1985)	Italy	Enrico Cerulli (1898–1988)	Italy
4	Saul Bellow (1915–2005)	Canada; United States	Roger Asselineau (1915–2002)	France
4	Saul Bellow (1915–2005)	Canada; United States	Jara Ribnikar (1912–2007)	Serbia
5	Louis Paul Boon (1912–1979)	Belgium	Paul Snoek (1933–1981)	Belgium
5	Louis Paul Boon (1912–1979)	Belgium	Theun de Vries (1907–2005)	Netherlands
5	Louis Paul Boon (1912–1979)	Belgium	Artur Lundkvist (1906–1991)	United States
6	Johan Borgen (1902–1979)	Norway	Ebba Haslund (1917–2009)	United States; Norway
7	Jorge Luis Borges (1899–1986)	Argentina	Charles Dédéyan (1910–2003)	France; Armenia
7	Jorge Luis Borges (1899–1986)	Argentina	Richard Goodiwn (1913–1996)	United States
7	Jorge Luis Borges (1899–1986)	Argentina	Jónas Kristjánsson (1924–2014)	Iceland
7	Jorge Luis Borges (1899–1986)	Argentina	Kurt Levy (1917–2000)	West Germany; Canada
7	Jorge Luis Borges (1899–1986)	Argentina	Sven Skydsgaard (1934–1979)	Denmark
7	Jorge Luis Borges (1899–1986)	Argentina	Kázmér Géza Werner (1900–1985)	Hungary; West Germany
8	Gwen Bristow (1903–1980)	United States	Lorenz Graham (1902–1989)	United States
9	Miodrag Bulatović (1930–1991)	Montenegro; Serbia	Royal Danish Academy of Sciences and Letters	Denmark
10	Anthony Burgess (1917–1993)	England	Artur Lundkvist (1906–1991)	Sweden
11	Elias Canetti (1905–1994)	Bulgaria; England	Manfred Durzak (1938–)	West Germany
11	Elias Canetti (1905–1994)	Bulgaria; England	Keith Spalding (1913–2002)	West Germany; England
12	Camilo José Cela (1916–2002)	Spain	Juan Contreras López de Ayala (1893–1978)	Spain
13	André Chamson (1900–1983)	France	Giannēs Koutsocheras (1904–1994)	Greece
13	André Chamson (1900–1983)	France	Yves Gandon (1899–1975)	France
13	André Chamson (1900–1983)	France	Armand Lunel (1892–1977)	France
13	André Chamson (1900–1983)	France	Guy Nairay (1914–1999)	France
14	Chen Min-hwa (1934–)	Taiwan	Emeterio Barcelon (1897–1978)	Philippines
15	Sri Chinmoy (1931–2007)	India; United States	Joseph Axelrod (1910–1974)	United States
15	Sri Chinmoy (1931–2007)	India; United States	Karl Kroeber (1926–2009)	United States
15	Sri Chinmoy (1931–2007)	India; United States	Peter Pitzele (1942–)	United States
16	Adolfo Costa du Rels (1891–1980)	Bolivia	Humberto Palza (1900–1975)	Bolivia
17	Fazıl Hüsnü Dağlarca (1914–2008)	Turkey	Yaşar Nabi Nayır (1908–1981)	Turkey
18	Kamala Surraya-Das (1934–2009)	India	Kappadath Parameswara Kannan (1949–)	India
19	Argentina Díaz Lozano (1909–1999)	Honduras	Luis Antonio Díaz Vasconcelos (1908–)	Guatemala
19	Argentina Díaz Lozano (1909–1999)	Honduras	José Luis Cifuentes (1908–1981)	Guatemala
20	Carlos Drummond de Andrade (1902–1987)	Brazil	Maria Alice Barroso (1926–2012)	Brazil
21	Friedrich Dürrenmatt (1921–1990)	Switzerland	Werner Betz (1912–1980)	West Germany
21	Friedrich Dürrenmatt (1921–1990)	Switzerland	Herbert Penzl (1910–1995)	Austria; United States
22	Ralph Ellison (1913–1994)	United States	Henri Peyre (1901–1988)	France; United States
23	Odysseas Elytis (1911–1996)	Greece	Nobel Committee	Sweden
24	Rabbe Enckell (1903–1974)	Finland	Eeva Kilpi (1928–2026)	Finland
24	Rabbe Enckell (1903–1974)	Finland	Lars Huldén (1926–2016)	Finland
25	Hans Magnus Enzensberger (1929–2022)	West Germany	Sven Skydsgaard (1934–1979)	Denmark
26	Salvador Espriu (1913–1985)	Spain	Antoni Comas i Pujol (1931–1981)	Spain
26	Salvador Espriu (1913–1985)	Spain	Bertil Maler (1910–1980)	Sweden
27	Jacques Floran (1918–1982)	France	Eugène Ionesco (1909–1994)	Romania; France
28	Max Frisch (1911–1991)	Switzerland	Henri Peyre (1901–1988)	France; United States
28	Max Frisch (1911–1991)	Switzerland	Leevi Valkama (1915–2000)	Finland
29	Armand Gatti (1924–2017)	France	Volker Klotz (1930–2023)	West Germany
30	William Golding (1911–1993)	England	Nobel Committee	Sweden
31	Nadine Gordimer (1923–2014)	South Africa	Artur Lundkvist (1906–1991)	Sweden
32	Julien Gracq (1910–2007)	France	Georges Matoré (1908–1998)	France
33	Günter Grass (1927–2015)	West Germany	Manfred Windfuhr (1930–)	West Germany
34	Robert Graves (1895–1985)	England	Norman Jeffares (1920–2005)	Ireland
35	Julien Green (1900–1998)	United States; France	Georges Sion (1913–2001)	Belgium
35	Julien Green (1900–1998)	United States; France	Edgar Shannon Jr. (1918–1997)	United States
36	Graham Greene (1904–1991)	England	Mira Mihelič (1912–1985)	Slovenia
36	Graham Greene (1904–1991)	England	Mary Renault (1905–1983)	England; South Africa
36	Graham Greene (1904–1991)	England	Herbert Waidson (1916–1988)	England
36	Graham Greene (1904–1991)	England	Walter Weiss (1927–2004)	Austria
36	Graham Greene (1904–1991)	England	Kázmér Géza Werner (1900–1985)	Hungary; West Germany
37	Jorge Guillén (1893–1984)	Spain	Henri Peyre (1901–1988)	France; United States
38	Paavo Haavikko (1931–2008)	Finland	Eeva Kilpi (1928–2026)	Finland
39	William Heinesen (1900–1991)	Faroe Islands	Gustav Albeck (1906–1995)	Denmark
39	William Heinesen (1900–1991)	Faroe Islands	Peter Foote (1924–2009)	England
39	William Heinesen (1900–1991)	Faroe Islands	William Glyn Jones (1928–2014)	England
39	William Heinesen (1900–1991)	Faroe Islands	Duncan Mennie (1909–1998)	England
39	William Heinesen (1900–1991)	Faroe Islands	Niels Clausen Lukman (1907–2003)	Denmark
40	Vladimír Holan (1905–1980)	Czechoslovakia	Nobel Committee	Sweden
41	Gyula Illyés (1902–1983)	Hungary	Iván Boldizsár (1912–1988)	Hungary
41	Gyula Illyés (1902–1983)	Hungary	Artur Lundkvist (1906–1991)	Sweden
42	Eugène Ionesco (1909–1994)	Romania; France	Denis de Rougemont (1906–1985)	Switzerland
43	Eyvind Johnson (1900–1976)	Sweden	Johannes Edfelt (1904–1997)	Sweden
43	Eyvind Johnson (1900–1976)	Sweden	Pär Lagerkvist (1891–1974)	Sweden
43	Eyvind Johnson (1900–1976)	Sweden	Jean-Baptiste Neveux (1923–2003)	France
43	Eyvind Johnson (1900–1976)	Sweden	Esko Pennanen (1912–1990)	Finland
43	Eyvind Johnson (1900–1976)	Sweden	Carl-Eric Thors (1920–1986)	Finland
44	Uwe Johnson (1934–1984)	East Germany	Shiela St. Clair (1930–)	Northern Ireland
45	Ferenc Juhász (1928–2015)	Hungary	Artur Lundkvist (1906–1991)	Sweden
46	Yaşar Kemal (1923–2015)	Turkey	Nobel Committee	Sweden
47	Brendan Kennelly (1936–2021)	Ireland	John Brendan Keane (1928–2002)	Ireland
48	Arthur Koestler (1905–1983)	Hungary; England	George Mikes (1912–1987)	Hungary; England
49	Miroslav Krleža (1893–1981)	Croatia	Nobel Committee	Sweden
50	Siegfried Lenz (1926–2014)	West Germany	Nobel Committee	Sweden
51	Doris Lessing (1919–2013)	Southern Rhodesia; England	Artur Lundkvist (1906–1991)	Sweden
52	Astrid Lindgren (1907–2002)	Sweden	Adolf März (1918–1987)	Austria
53	Väinö Linna (1920–1992)	Finland	Eeva Kilpi (1928–2026)	Finland
54	Robert Lowell (1917–1977)	United States	Hans Galinsky (1909–1991)	West Germany; United States
55	Salvador de Madariaga (1886–1978)	Spain	Julián Gorkin (1901–1987)	Spain
56	Norman Mailer (1923–2007)	United States	Artur Lundkvist (1906–1991)	Sweden
57	Bernard Malamud (1914–1986)	United States	Nobel Committee	Sweden
58	Eduardo Mallea (1903–1982)	Argentina	Manuel Durán Gili (1925–2020)	Spain; United States
59	André Malraux (1901–1976)	France	Lloyd James Austin (1915–1994)	Australia
59	André Malraux (1901–1976)	France	Henning Fenger (1921–1985)	Denmark
59	André Malraux (1901–1976)	France	Göran Hermerén (1938–)	Sweden
59	André Malraux (1901–1976)	France	Jan Kott (1914–2001)	Poland
59	André Malraux (1901–1976)	France	Maija Lehtonen (1924–2015)	Finland
59	André Malraux (1901–1976)	France	Henri Peyre (1901–1988)	France; United States
59	André Malraux (1901–1976)	France	Magnus von Platen (1920–2020)	Sweden
59	André Malraux (1901–1976)	France	John Henry Raleigh (1920–2001)	United States
59	André Malraux (1901–1976)	France	Michael Riffaterre (1924–2006)	France; United States
59	André Malraux (1901–1976)	France	Laurent Versini (1932–2021)	France
60	Frederick Manfred (1912–1994)	United States	Madison Jones (1925–2012)	United States
60	Frederick Manfred (1912–1994)	United States	Wayne Knutson (1926–2015)	United States
61	Herbert Marcuse (1898–1979)	West Germany; United States	Hans Mayer (1907–2001)	West Germany
62	Harry Martinson (1904–1978)	Sweden	Johannes Edfelt (1904–1997)	Sweden
62	Harry Martinson (1904–1978)	Sweden	Pär Lagerkvist (1891–1974)	Sweden
63	Segismundo Masel (1895–1985)	Argentina	Antonio de Tornes Ballesteros (–)	Argentina
64	László Mécs (1895–1978)	Hungary	Watson Kirkconnell (1895–1977)	Canada
65	Henri Michaux (1899–1984)	Belgium; France	Nobel Committee	Sweden
66	Czesław Miłosz (1911–2004)	Poland	Algirdas Landsbergis (1924–2004)	Lithuania; United States
67	Eugenio Montale (1896–1981)	Italy	Henri Peyre (1901–1988)	France; United States
67	Eugenio Montale (1896–1981)	Italy	Luciano Rebay (1928–2014)	Italy; United States
67	Eugenio Montale (1896–1981)	Italy	Uberto Limentani (1913–1989)	Italy
67	Eugenio Montale (1896–1981)	Italy	Royal Danish Academy of Sciences and Letters	Denmark
68	Alberto Moravia (1907–1990)	Italy	Jacques Robichez (1914–1999)	France
69	Vladimir Nabokov (1899–1977)	Russia; United States	Hans Bielenstein (1920–2015)	Sweden
69	Vladimir Nabokov (1899–1977)	Russia; United States	Hans Rothe (1928–2021)	West Germany
69	Vladimir Nabokov (1899–1977)	Russia; United States	Antun Šoljan (1932–1993)	Croatia
69	Vladimir Nabokov (1899–1977)	Russia; United States	Bernard Tervoort (1920–2006)	Netherlands
70	V. S. Naipaul (1932–2018)	Trinidad and Tobago; England	Artur Lundkvist (1906–1991)	Sweden
71	R. K. Narayan (1906–2001)	India	Prabhakar Machwe (1917–1991)	India
71	R. K. Narayan (1906–2001)	India	Ediriweera Sarachchandra (1914–1916)	Sri Lanka
72	Mikhail Naimy (1889–1988)	Lebanon	Toufic Fahd (1923–2009)	Lebanon
73	Victoria Ocampo (1890–1979)	Argentina	Miguel Alfredo Olivera (1922–2008)	Argentina
73	Victoria Ocampo (1890–1979)	Argentina	Fryda Schultz de Mantovani (1912–1978)	Argentina
74	Kenzaburō Ōe (1935–2023)	Japan	Kōjirō Serizawa (1896–1993)	Japan
75	Germán Pardo García (1902–1991)	Colombia; Mexico	José María Acosta Acosta (–)	Colombia
76	Octavio Paz (1914–1998)	Mexico	Henri Peyre (1901–1988)	France; United States
76	Octavio Paz (1914–1998)	Mexico	Denis de Rougemont (1906–1985)	Switzerland
77	José María Pemán (1897–1981)	Spain	Emeterio Barcelon (1897–1978)	Philippines
77	José María Pemán (1897–1981)	Spain	Academia Filipina de la Lengua Española	Philippines
77	José María Pemán (1897–1981)	Spain	Manuel Halcón (1900–1989)	Spain
77	José María Pemán (1897–1981)	Spain	Fabio Amable Mota (1893–1975)	Dominican Republic
77	José María Pemán (1897–1981)	Spain	Mariano Lebrón Saviñón (1922–2014)	Dominican Republic
78	Harold Pinter (1930–2008)	England	Paul Goetsch (1934–2018)	West Germany
78	Harold Pinter (1930–2008)	England	Gerhard Nickel (1928–2015)	West Germany
79	Francis Ponge (1899–1988)	France	Michael Riffaterre (1924–2006)	France; United States
80	Zayn al-ʻĀbidīn Rahnamā (1894–1990)	Iran	Abbas Aryanpur-Kashani (1906–1985)	Iran
80	Zayn al-ʻĀbidīn Rahnamā (1894–1990)	Iran	Mohammad Mohammadi-Malayeri (1911–2002)	Iran
81	Yannis Ritsos (1909–1990)	Greece	Per Wästberg (1933–)	Sweden
82	Tadeusz Rózewicz (1921–2014)	Poland	Józef Trypućko (1910–1983)	Poland
82	Tadeusz Rózewicz (1921–2014)	Poland	Per Wästberg (1933–)	Sweden
83	Jaroslav Seifert (1901–1986)	Czechoslovakia	Ľubomír Ďurovič (1925–2022)	Slovakia
84	Léopold Sédar Senghor (1906–2001)	Senegal	Roger Asselineau (1915–2002)	France
85	Ignazio Silone (1900–1978)	Italy	Nicolas Perella (1927–2015)	United States
85	Ignazio Silone (1900–1978)	Italy	Denis de Rougemont (1906–1985)	Switzerland
86	Georges Simenon (1903–1989)	Belgium	Axel Springer (1912–1985)	West Germany
87	Claude Simon (1913–2005)	France	Nobel Committee	Sweden
87	Claude Simon (1913–2005)	France	Haydn Trevor Mason (1929–2018)	England
88	Isaac Bashevis Singer (1902–1991)	Poland; United States	Jules Brody (1928–2021)	United States
88	Isaac Bashevis Singer (1902–1991)	Poland; United States	Julien Hirshaut (1908–1983)	United States
88	Isaac Bashevis Singer (1902–1991)	Poland; United States	Lothar Kahn (1922–1990)	United States
88	Isaac Bashevis Singer (1902–1991)	Poland; United States	Percy Matenko (1901–1987)	United States
89	Stephen Spender (1909–1995)	United States	Barbara Hardy (1924–2016)	England
90	Zaharia Stancu (1902–1974)	Romania	Alf Lombard (1902–1996)	Sweden
90	Zaharia Stancu (1902–1974)	Romania	Aatos Ojala (1919–1987)	Finland
91	Isidor Feinstein Stone (1907–1989)	United States	Joseph Axelrod (1910–1974)	United States
92	Abraham Sutzkever (1913–2010)	Belarus; Israel	Joseph Leftwich (1892–1984)	England
93	Pratap Narayan Tandon (1932–)	India	Kesari Narayan Shukla (–)	India
94	Marie Under (1883–1980)	Estonia	Ants Oras (1900–1982)	Estonia
95	Antonio Buero Vallejo (1916–2000)	Spain	Juan Contreras López de Ayala (1893–1978)	Spain
96	José García Villa (1908–1997)	Philippines; United States	Purita Kalaw Ledesma (1914–2005)	Philippines
97	Gerard Walschap (1898–1989)	Belgium	Maurice Gilliams (1900–1982)	Belgium
97	Gerard Walschap (1898–1989)	Belgium	Willem Pée (1903–1986)	Belgium
98	Louise Weiss (1893–1983)	France	Jacques Chabannes (1900–1994)	France
98	Louise Weiss (1893–1983)	France	Paul Mousset (1907–1981)	France
98	Louise Weiss (1893–1983)	France	Étienne Wolff (1904–1996)	France
99	Erico Verissimo (1905–1975)	Brazil	Ernesto Leme (1896–1986)	Brazil
100	Sándor Weöres (1913–1989)	Hungary	Áron Kibédi Varga (1930–2018)	Hungary; Netherlands
101	Elie Wiesel (1928–2016)	Romania; United States	Irving Abrahamson (1925–2022)	United States
101	Elie Wiesel (1928–2016)	Romania; United States	Marver Bernstein (1919–1990)	United States
101	Elie Wiesel (1928–2016)	Romania; United States	Harry Cagas (1932–1998)	United States
101	Elie Wiesel (1928–2016)	Romania; United States	Gerson Cohen (1924–1991)	United States
101	Elie Wiesel (1928–2016)	Romania; United States	Dale Corson (1914–2012)	United States
101	Elie Wiesel (1928–2016)	Romania; United States	Maurice Friedman (1921–2012)	United States
101	Elie Wiesel (1928–2016)	Romania; United States	James Friend (1932–1987)	United States
101	Elie Wiesel (1928–2016)	Romania; United States	Irving Greenberg (1933–)	United States
101	Elie Wiesel (1928–2016)	Romania; United States	Irving Halperin (1922–2000)	United States
101	Elie Wiesel (1928–2016)	Romania; United States	Gerd Høst-Heyerdahl (1915–2007)	Norway
101	Elie Wiesel (1928–2016)	Romania; United States	Edward Levi (1911–2000)	United States
101	Elie Wiesel (1928–2016)	Romania; United States	Franklin Littell (1917–2009)	United States
101	Elie Wiesel (1928–2016)	Romania; United States	Robert Marshak (1916–1992)	United States
101	Elie Wiesel (1928–2016)	Romania; United States	Elizabeth McCormack (1922–2020)	United States
101	Elie Wiesel (1928–2016)	Romania; United States	André Neher (1914–1988)	France
101	Elie Wiesel (1928–2016)	Romania; United States	David Weinstein (1908–1993)	United States
101	Elie Wiesel (1928–2016)	Romania; United States	Melvin Yoken (1939–)	United States

=== Prize decision ===
The previous year, the Swedish Academy had discussed if it was suitable for the Academy to award Swedish authors, following the proposals of Johnson, Martinson and novelist Vilhelm Moberg (1898-1973) as candidates for the prize. Concerns had been raised that awarding a Swedish author would harm the international reputation of the Nobel prize and the Swedish Academy's prestige. In a report dated 5 June 1973, Nobel committee chairman Karl Ragnar Gierow wrote on the matter that Johnson, Martinson and Moberg were all worthy recipients of the prize and of the same literary class as the shortlisted candidates for the 1973 prize. Gierow argued that excluding Swedish persons from being awarded the Nobel prize had no support in the statues of the Nobel Foundation and that Alfred Nobel in his will had specifically written that no regard of nationality should be taken, but that the worthiest candidate should be awarded. Gierow said that an unprejudiced examination of the candidates individual merits should be the first and essential basis of the decision and left it to the Academy to further deliberate on a prize to the Swedish candidates.

In 1974, a shared prize to Eyvind Johnson and Harry Martinson was proposed by Johannes Edfelt, a member of the Swedish Academy. Johnson and Martinson were also nominated individually by Pär Lagerkvist of the Swedish Academy and Johnson individually by three external nominators. As three members of the Swedish Academy had recently died in 1974, and Johnson and Martinson themselves did not take any part in the deliberations, the prize decision for the 1974 Nobel Prize in Literature was taken by at most thirteen individuals. Member Anders Österling revealed that the prize decision was "very unanimous".

For the 1974 prize, the Nobel committee shortlisted eight authors in six proposals, including three proposals for a shared prize. The Nobel committee proposed that the 1974 Nobel Prize in Literature should be awarded jointly to Eyvind Johnson and Harry Martinson. The committee's second proposal was a shared prize to Nadine Gordimer (subsequently awarded in 1991) and Doris Lessing (awarded in 2007). Their third proposal was Saul Bellow (awarded in 1976), either awarded alone or shared with Norman Mailer, and their fourth proposal was Eugenio Montale (awarded in 1975). Graham Greene, who had for many years been a candidate for the prize, was again also proposed by the committee.

Committee chair Karl Ragnar Gierow listed Johnson and Martinson as his first proposal and argued that the two authors "from a strictly literary perspective are equal or ahead of several of those, who are now considered for a Nobel prize or have already received it", and again noted that denying authors from being awarded the Nobel prize because they are Swedish or members of the Swedish Academy had no support at all in the statutes of the Nobel Foundation. Gierow's second proposal was Graham Greene, citing Greene's recent novel The Honorary Consul as a work that had strengthened his long standing candidacy, and Montale his third proposal.

Committee member Artur Lundkvist strongly opposed that the Swedish Academy should award the Nobel Prize to its own members and urged Johnson and Martinson to not accept the prize, thinking it would make them unhappy. Lundkvist later said he thought the award brought the authors to a too early death. Lundkvist advocated a shared prize to Gordimer and Lessing. No other objections against the proposal to award Johnson and Martinson the prize was noted within the Academy.

=== Leakage of the deliberations to the Swedish press ===
Some member of the Swedish Academy leaked information about the deliberations to award Johnson and Martinson to the Swedish press. The Swedish newspaper Expressen was particularly well informed and had already in 1972 reported that Johnson and Martinson were shortlisted candidates for the prize. On 12 September 1974 Expressen reported that Johnson and Martinson was likely to be awarded that year's Nobel Prize in Literature. A few days after the Swedish Academy's preliminary voting on 26 September 1974, Swedish radio and several newspapers reported that a decision had been taken by the Academy to award Johnson and Martinson. Expressen was so certain about the information that they published Sven Delblanc's critical article "A catastrophic decision" (see below) before the Swedish Academy's official announcement on 3 October 1974.

== Reactions ==
The joint selection of Eyvind Johnson and Martinson for the Nobel Prize was very controversial as both were members of the Swedish Academy, the institution that awards the Nobel Prize in Literature. Graham Greene, Jorge Luis Borges, Saul Bellow (awarded in 1976) and Vladimir Nabokov were favourites to win the award that year.

The choice of Johnson and Martinson was heavily criticised by the press in their home country, mainly because the Swedish Academy awarded two of their own members. The most fierce critic, Sven Delblanc in Expressen, called it "a catastrophic decision" and said that the little credibility of the Nobel Prize in Literature that was left "would be wiped out with mockery, rolling around the world". He thought awarding the two academy members was a case of corruption: “There exists no strong international opinion advocating these authors. The choice reflects a lack of judgment by the academy. And lack of judgment in a serious context like this can only too easily be interpreted as corruption through camaraderie. Mutual admiration is one thing, but this smells almost like embezzlement.” The choices were also attacked by some other younger literature figures, saying the authors had written their best works too far back in time and that neither had won any international reputation.

According to research of press clips and letters sent to the Swedish Academy and Johan Svedjedal's 2023 biography of Harry Martinson, the negative reactions to the prize decision has however proved to have been exaggerated with one-sided focus on Delblanc's article and the negative reactions of Olof Lagercrantz. The contemporary reactions were rather mixed with several positive reactions both in Sweden and internationally. In a survey in Svenska Dagbladet, a majority of the literary professors and authors called it an excellent choice. Literature professor Thure Stenström said: "It is a triumph for all cultures good forces when an authorship such as Eyvind Johnson's is awarded. Harry Martinson is also an extraordinary worthy candidate. (...) Aniara alone would of course count as a merit enough for the Nobel prize." Literature professor Gunnar Brandell said that the prize decision was likely to be criticized internationally; "But one can take that calmly. Those who know these prospected Nobel prize laureates works of course know that they each in their own way measure up well." Swedish author and critic Karl Vennberg also favoured the prize and was quoted saying in the New York Times: “I find that if I myself had a Nobel Prize to give, I would have been prepared to give Harry Martinson one as far back as 1932.”

International reactions generally focused on the fact that Johnson and Martinson were little known outside their home country, and were sometimes negatively or neutrally reported. Some of the international reactions were however much less negative than the Swedish reactions. The French newspaper La Nouvelle République said that Johnson and Martinson were "remarkable representatives of the modern Swedish literature and their work undoubtly deserve to be much known". Positive reactions were also noted in Denmark, Norway, Finland, England and the USA. A writer in Times Literary Supplement wrote "That Martinson and Johnson are worthy recipients of the prize, few acquainted with their work would deny." In the same publication, the Swedish criticism was described as driven by envy of the same kind that had beset several other successful Swedish people.

=== Personal reactions ===
According to academy member Lars Gyllensten, both authors were badly affected by the negativity and criticism following the award. The sensitive Martinson found it hard to cope with the criticism following his award, and died on 11 February 1978 at the Karolinska University Hospital in Stockholm after cutting his stomach open with a pair of scissors in what has been described as a "hara-kiri-like manner".

== Award ceremony ==
At the award ceremony on 10 December 1974 in Stockholm Concert Hall Eyvind Johnson and Harry Martinson received their awards. At the ceremony Alexander Solzhenitsyn also received his 1970 Nobel Prize in Literature, after finally having been allowed to leave the Soviet Union. Solzhenitsyn's presence was much noticed in the Swedish press.

== Aftermath ==
In his memoirs, published in 2000, former secretary of the Swedish Academy and Nobel committee member Lars Gyllensten justified the prize decision and claimed that it was well received by the Swedish public. The negative reactions in the Swedish press Gyllensten described as driven by envy and the Law of Jante. In the book Gyllensten claimed that Martinson's suicide in 1978 was a direct result of the heavy criticism led by Sven Delblanc in Expressen and Olof Lagercrantz in Dagens Nyheter.

In September 2024, Sveriges Television premiered the one hour documentary Harry och Eyvind - Nobelpriset som förstörde allt ("Harry and Eyvind - The Nobel Prize that ruined everything") by Hanna Cedergren and Anders Lundgren, including archive footage and interviews with David Lagercrantz (son of Olof Lagercrantz), and Harry Martinson's biographer Johan Svedjedal, among others. In his 2023 Harry Martinson biography, Svedjedal devoted over twenty pages to the 1974 Nobel Prize in literature. Svedjedal concluded: "In the longer perspective the Nobel prize helped to further bring Harry Martinson and Eyvind Johnson to the world literature. But in the short and half-long perspective the prize was rather a pain for especially Harry. Even if many reactions were positive he felt the negative so strong that nearly all happiness was ruined."
