= Return to Ithaca =

Return to Ithaca may refer to:

- Return to Ithaca (film), a 2014 comedy-drama film
- Return to Ithaca (novel), a 1946 novel by Eyvind Johnson
