= Thure Stenström =

Swedish literary historian

Thure Stenström (1927 – 15 March 2026) was a Swedish literary historian.

He was born in Gotland, growing up as a farmer's son in Romakloster. He took his doctorate in 1961 on a thesis about loneliness in Nordic literature. He later wrote about French existentialism and existentialism in Sweden, and notably studied writers such as Hjalmar Bergman, Eyvind Johnson, Lars Gyllensten, Torgny Lindgren and Annie Ernaux. He was a professor of literary science at Uppsala University from 1971 to 1993.

He was also a visiting scholar at Harvard University. He was a fellow of the Norwegian Academy of Science and Letters from 1993, received an honorary degree in theology at Uppsala University and was a Knight of the Ordre des Palmes académiques.

He was furthermore a contributor to Svenska Dagbladet, penning over 200 pieces. He also played the church organ and harpsichord.

He died in March 2026, aged 98.
