= The Days of His Grace =

1960 novel by Eyvind Johnson

- First US edition
- Author: Eyvind Johnson
- Original title: Hans nådes tid
- Translator: Elspeth Harley Schubert
- Language: Swedish
- Set in: Italy
- Published: 1960
- Publisher: Vanguard Press (US)
- Publication place: Sweden
- English publication date: 1968
- Awards: Nordic Council's Literature Prize of 1962

The Days of His Grace (Swedish: Hans nådes tid) is a 1960 novel by Swedish writer Eyvind Johnson. Set mostly in northern Italy, close to Aquileia, it tells the story of the fate of a Langobard family as their homeland falls under the domination of Charlemagne. The major theme running through the book is the way the actions of the various characters are influenced by love, but also the difficulty of adapting to the arbitrary and overbearing power of absolute monarchy. The novel, translated into English by Elspeth Harley Schubert and published in 1968, is based somewhat on Charlemagne conquering northern Italy in 775. In its introductory remarks, Johnson acknowledges the historical plot, and his altering some dates. The central story follows the Lupigis family and the difficult fates they suffer following a rebellion against Emperor Charlemagne.

The novel received critical acclaim and the Nordic Council Literature Prize. The Swedish National Encyclopedia states that it was presumably of decisive importance for the Swedish Academy's decision to award Johnson the Nobel Prize for Literature.

== Background ==
Eyvind Johnson had been interested in the history of the Langobards since his youth, and had already in 1923 acquired a German translation of Paul the Deacon's Historia Langobardorum. Since the 1930s Johnson had plans to write a novel about the times of Charlemagne, but due to other projects this idea was not realised until much later. Johnson started writing The Days of his Grace in 1957 and finished it in May 1960. Prior to the publication in September 1960, two excerpts from the novel was published in the Swedish literary magazine Bonniers litterära magasin in 1959 and 1960 respectively.

== Plot ==
Duke Rodgaud—cousin of Bertold, castle in Forojuli (contemporary name, Cividale, Italy), starts a rebellion against King Carolus, that is quickly put down. He is executed by the Franks in Papia, summer, 776. Angilperta (“Angila”), the daughter of Rodgaud and Giseverga, is loved by the three Lupigi boys. She cannot be found during the rebellion, but becomes post-rebellion the wife of the Lord of East Burgundy, Gunderic, her name becoming Landoalda. She has Radbert as a lover, has two children, Landoald and Gisertruda, who die young, and a third child, Radaberta is given away. Gunderic imprisons her in the castle tower for seven years, after which Perto comes with an order from King Carolus to let her return to Forojuli. She dies on that trip back to her childhood home. Bertold Lupigi, cousin of Duke Rodgaud. The family name, Lupigi comes from wolf, loup. He disappears in the rebellion and is found in a dungeon. He is freed from prison, post-rebellion, in 793, but is killed by an avalanche. Perto, son of Liuta and Bertold, is 16 years old at the novel's beginning, the youngest of three brothers. He loves Angila. He is also named Johannes Lupigis, more so as the novel progresses. During the rebellion, he manages to escape the Franks who kill his friend Sinauld. He visits Angilperta with Agibert in the autumn of 783, and sleeps with Angilperta. Late autumn 783 he arrives in Aquisgranum, where there is a royal college. He meets King Carolus and decides he is “indeed great.” Perto goes to Totonisvilla where his brother Warnefrit is in prison, but is seized by guards as he leaves the prison. In prison for three and a half years, in total darkness of the prison cell, he creates a vision of a flowering bush. Then he dines with the Devil, who tempts him. He is released from jail at the age of 31 and goes to Aquisgranum where his Uncle Anselm explains the reasons for his imprisonment. He becomes part of King Carolus's Court again, and eventually gets an order allowing Angilperta to return to her childhood home. Warnefrit, the son of Liuta and Bertold, the oldest of three brothers, likes relations with slave women. He becomes engaged to Angila. All of chapter 16 is his angry and frustrated monologue as heir to his father. He disappears in the rebellion and is found in a dungeon, where he remains for over ten years post-rebellion. His brother Perto comes to get him from prison, though he does not recognize Perto. Eranbald brings Warnefrit to Gudneric, where Angilperta is, and they all dine together though Warnefrit does not seem to recognize Angilperta. Healthy again, he defends the kingdom against Huns.

== Critical reception ==
Upon its publication in 1960, The Days of his Grace received unanimous praise by nearly all of the leading Swedish literary critics who deemed it a highpoint in Johnson's literary career. The novel was awarded the Nordic Council Literature Prize in 1962 and was translated to Danish, Norwegian, Finnish, German and English.

== Online sources ==
- Eyvind Johnson Nobel acceptance speech at Nobel website http://nobelprize.org/nobel_prizes/literature/laureates/1974/johnson-speech.html
- Eyvind Johnson biography at Answers.com http://www.answers.com/topic/eyvind-johnson
- Petri Liukkonen. "Eyvind Johnson". Books and Writers.
