= Miodrag Popović =

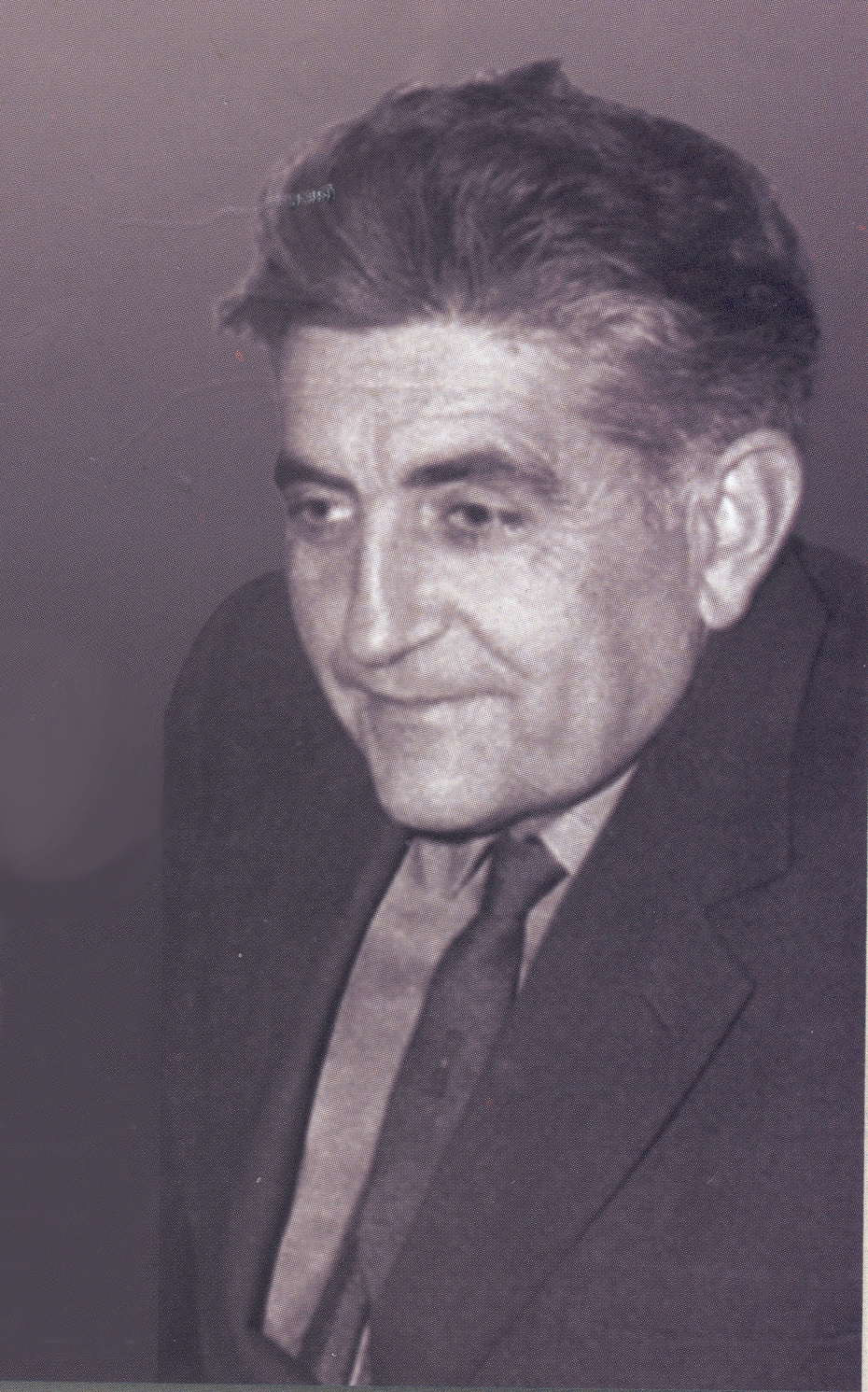
Miodrag Popović

Miodrag Popović (Serbian Cyrillic: Миодраг Поповић; 1920-2005) was a Yugoslav and Serbian historian.

== Works ==
=== Monographies ===
- Vuk Stefanović Karadžić 1787-1864, 1964
- Istorija srpske književnosti – romantizam I – III, 1968 — 1972
- Romantizam I – III, drugo skraćeno i prerađeno izdanje, Nolit, Beograd, 1975,
- Istorija srpske književnosti – romantizam I i II, 1985
