= Pratap Narayan Tandon =

Indian Hindi social novelist

- Pratāpanārāyaṇa Ṭaṇḍana
- Born: c. 1935 (age 90–91); Lucknow, Uttar Pradesh, British Raj
- Occupation: Author
- Writing career
- Notable work: Andhi Duniyan (1970)

Pratāpanārāyaṇa Ṭaṇḍana (born c. 1935, Lucknow), anglicized as Pratap Narayan Tandon, is an Indian Hindi social novelist and literary critic nominated for the Nobel Prize in Literature.

== Biography ==
Tandon was born on 1935 in the city of Lucknow, British Raj.

=== Career ===
Between 1960 and 1970, he wrote a number of novels, which helped to establish a completely new genre of readers. He used simple, conversational Hindi when writing, and his writing style was completely original. He is regarded as an accomplished writer of novels centered on current events.

His most successful novel was Andhi Duniyan, published in 1970. It follows the story of Riti, a young girl who finds herself instantly encircled by darkness, and the entire world watches as the drama of her life plays out. When she lost her sight, her good looks were totally overshadowed, and she has to fight social suffocations despite her constant pains to rebel.

=== Recognition ===
In 1973 and 1974, he was nominated for the Nobel Prize in Literature by Brij Behari Nayak, professor and director of University of Lucknow, and Kesari Narayan Shukla, professor of Hindi and Modern Indian Languages of the same university, respectively.

== Publications ==
=== Fiction ===
- 1956: Kaindidey [कैंडिडे] (Eng. trans. Candide). Sahitya Prakashan
- 1960: Andhi Drishti [अन्धी दृष्टि] (Eng. trans. Blind Vision). Sāhitya Kendra Prakāśana
- 1964: Navab Kankauva [नवाब कनकौवा]. Sāhitya Kendra Prakāśana
- 1964: Śūnya kī pūrti [शून्य की पूर्ति] (Eng. trans. Filling the Void). Viveka Prakāśana
- 1964: Rūpahale pānī kī būn̐deṃ [रुपहले पानी की बूंदें] (Eng. trans. Silver Water Drops). Viveka Prakāśana
- 1965: Patharīle pratirūpa [पथरिले प्रतिरूपा] (Eng. trans. Rocky Pattern). Viveka Prakāśana
- 1966: Vāsanā ke aṅkura [संकल्प के स्कोरा] (Eng. trans. Skora of Resolution). Sāhitya Kendra Prakāśana
- 1966: Rita [रीता]. Sāhitya Kendra Prakāśana
- 1966: Abhiśaptā [अभिशप्त] (Eng. trans. Accursed). Sāhitya Kendra Prakāśana
- 1969: Premacanda [प्रेमकांडा] (Eng. trans. Love Affair). Sāmayika Prakāśana
- 1970: Andhi Duniyan [आधी दुनिया] (Eng. trans. Half the World). Sanmārga Prakāśana, Penguin Random House India
- 1971: Pala do pala [एक क्षण, एक क्षण] (Eng. trans. A Moment, A Moment). Rājapāla
- 1975: Dhabbe [धब्बे] (Eng. trans. Spots). Sanmārga Prakāśana

=== Non-fiction ===
- 1956: Urdu-Sahitya ka Saral Ititras [उर्दू-साहित्य का सरल िटिटर्स] (Eng. trans. Simple Titters of Urdu Literature). Vidyamandir Press
- 1956: Hindī upanyāsa meṃ varga-bhāvanā [हिन्दी उपन्यासा मे वर्ग-भावना] (Eng. trans. Classic Sentiments in Hindi Novels). Hindī Sāhitya Bhaṇḍāra
- 1957: Hindī sāhitya: pichhala dashak [हिन्दी साहित्य : पिछला दशक] (Eng. trans. Hindi Literature: Last Decade). Hindī Sāhitya Bhaṇḍāra
- 1964: Hindī upanyāsa meṃ kathā-śilpa kā vikāsa [हिंदी उपन्यास में कथा-शिल्प का विकास] (* 1964: Hindi Upanyas Mein Katha Shilp ka Vikas [हिंदी उपन्यास में कथा शिल्प का विकास] (Eng. trans. Development of Narrative Craft in Hindi Novel). Hindī Sāhitya Bhaṇḍāra
- 1965: Hindī upanyāsa kalā [हिंदी उपन्यास काला] (Eng. trans. The Hindi Black Novel). Hindī Samiti, Sūcanā Vibhāga, Uttara Pradeśa
- 1965: Samīkshā ke māna aura Hindī samīkshā kī viśishṭa pravr̥ttiyām̐ [समीक्षा की मुख्य आभा हिंदी समीक्षा की विशिष्ट प्रवृत्तियाम्] (Eng. trans. Reflection of Review: Distinctive Tendencies of Hindi Review). Viveka Prakāśana
- 1967: Hindī upanyāsa kā paricayaātmaka itihāsa [हिंदी उपन्यासों का इतिहास] (Eng. trans. History of Hindi Novels). Viveka Prakāśana
- 1968: Hindī sāhitya kā pravr̥ttigata itihāsa [हिंदी साहित्य का प्रवृत्ति इतिहास] (Eng. trans. Early History of Hindi Literature). Viveka Prakāśana
- 1970: Pāścātya samīkshā kī rūparekhā [पाश्चत्य समीक्षा की रूपरेखा] (Eng. trans. Outline of Western Review). Rājapāla
- 1970: Hindī kahānī kalā [हिंदी कहानी काली] (Eng. trans. The Hindi Black Story). Hindī Samiti, Sūcanā Vibhāga, Uttara Pradeśa
- 1971: Roos ke mahan upanyaasakaar [रूस के महँ उपन्यासकार] (Eng. trans. Russia's Greatest Novelist). Lucknow Vivak Prakashan
- 1972: Saṃskr̥ta samīkshā kī rūparekhā [संस्कृत समीक्षा की रूपरेखा] (Eng. trans. Outline of Sanskrit Review). Somaiyā Pablikeśansa
- 1973: Hindī sāhitya kā itihāsa [हिन्दी साहित्य का इतिहास] (Eng. trans. History of Hindi Literature). Nīlābha Prakāśana
- 1974: Hindī upanyāsa kā udbhava aura vikāsa [हिंदी उपन्यास का उदभव और विकास] (Eng. trans. Origin and Development of Hindi Novel). Kalpakāra Prakāśana
- 1982: Vyaktitva aur krutitva [व्यक्तित्व और कृतित्व] (Eng. trans. Personality and Creativity). Sāmayika Prakāśana
- 1986: Brahath Hindi patrakarita kosh [बृहत हिन्दी पत्रकारिता कोश] (Eng. trans. Greater Hindi Journalism Dictionary). Viveka Prakāśana
