= Nobel Committee for Literature =

Awarding committee for Nobel Prize in Literature

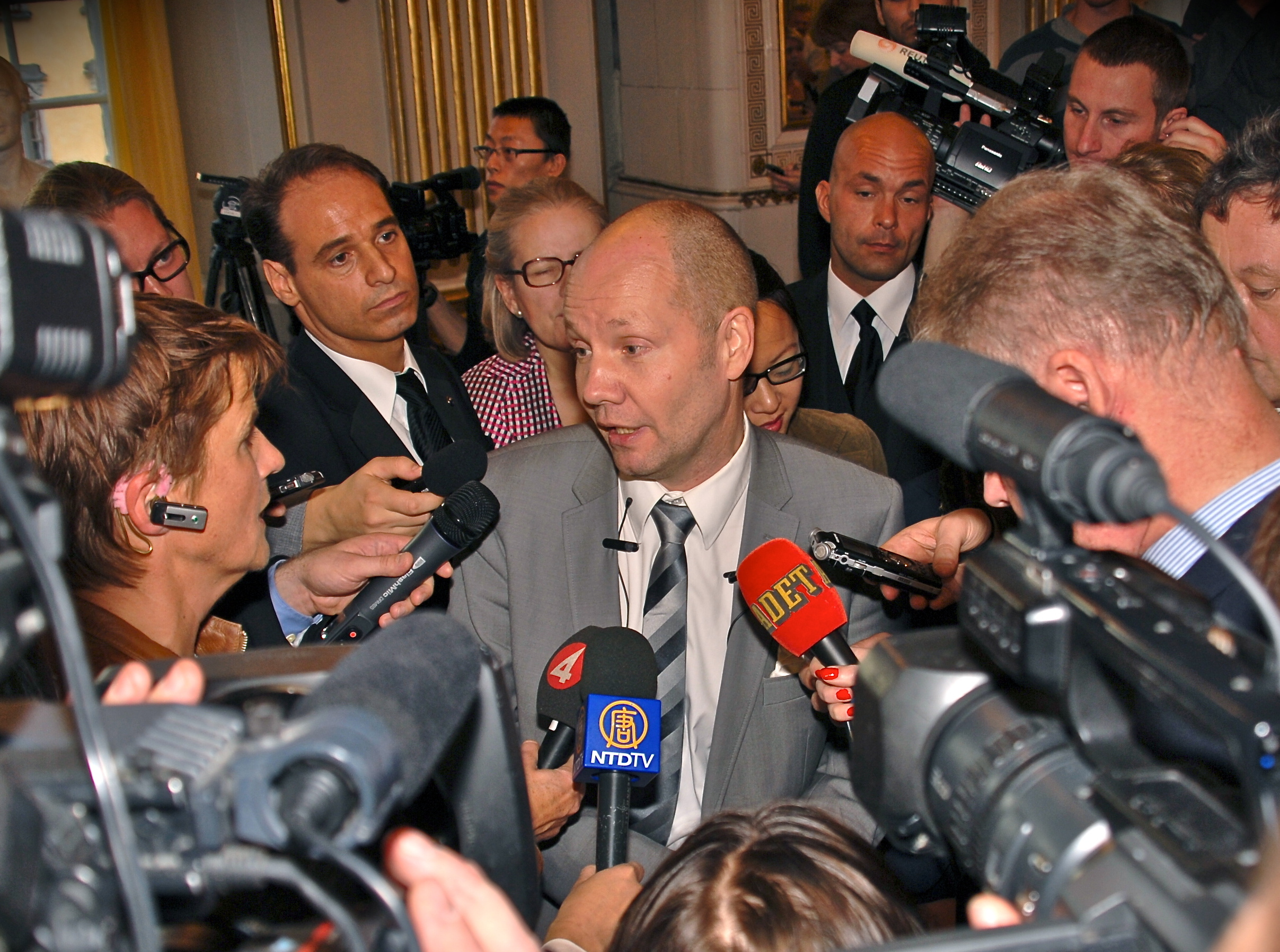
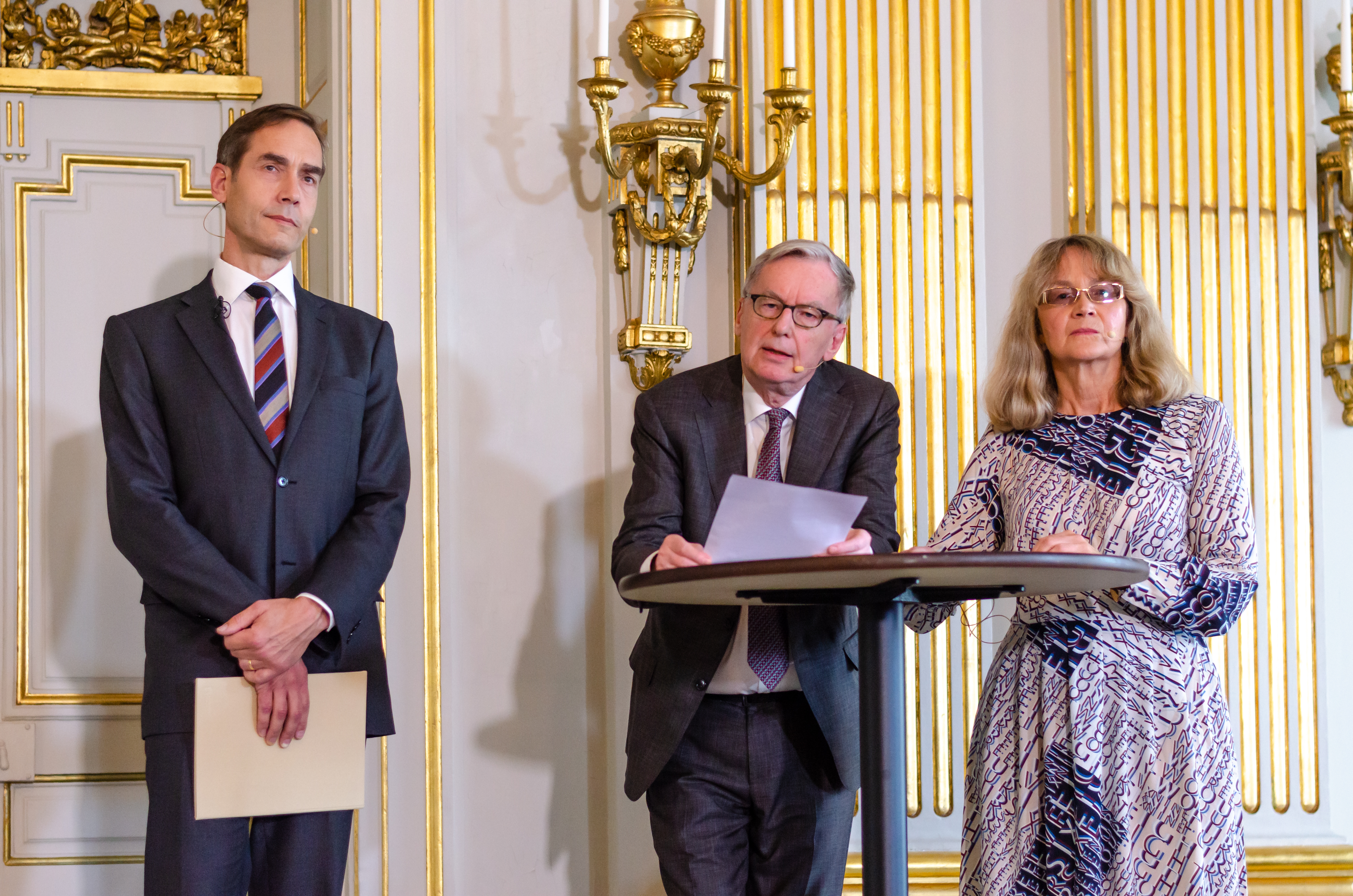
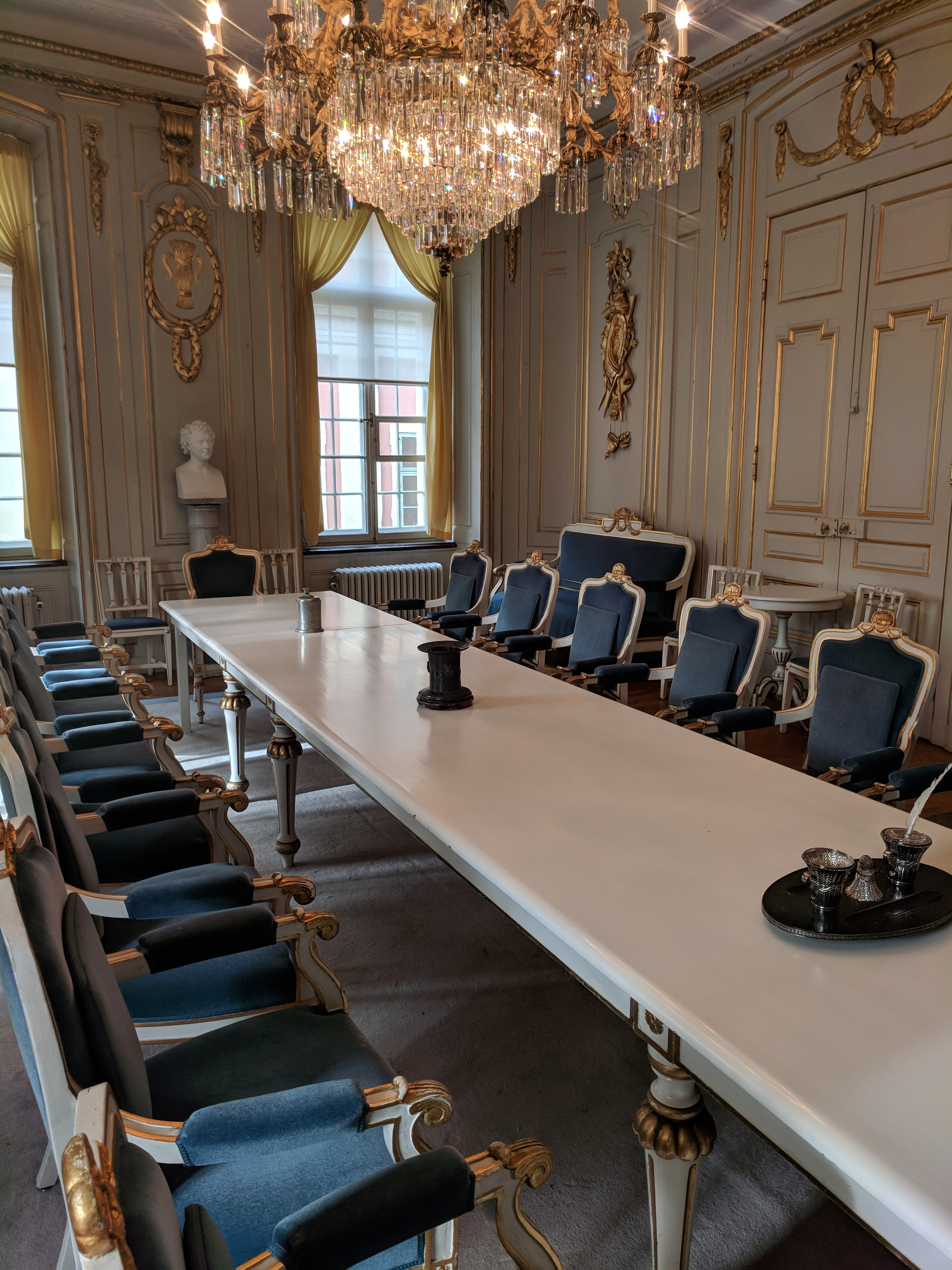
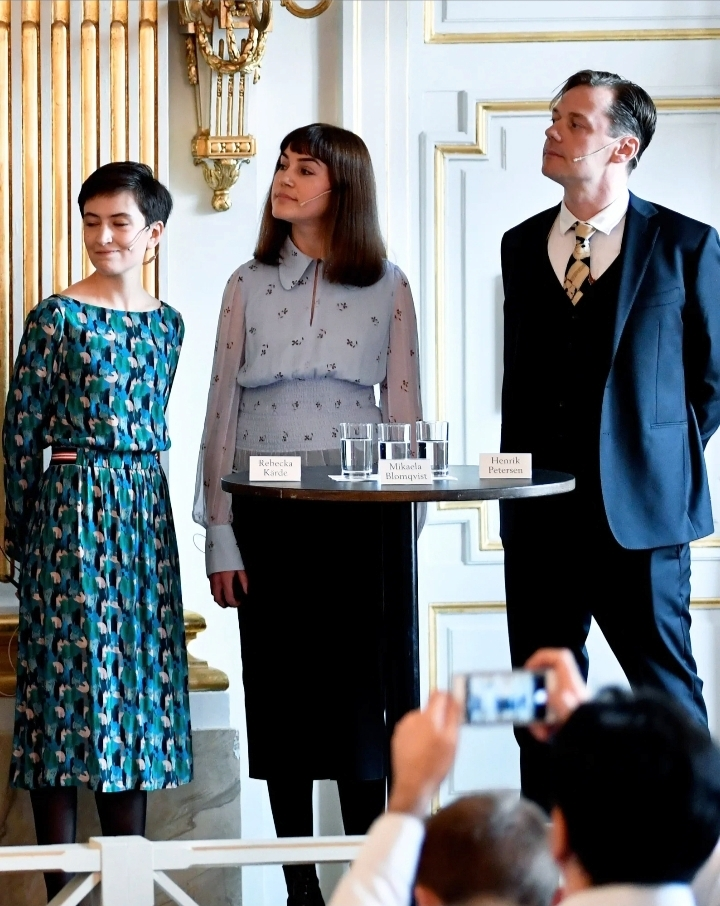
Clockwise from top left: Committee chair Anders Olsson explaining Annie Ernaux's qualities of being the 2022 Nobel laureate with Committee member Ellen Mattson and Permanent Secretary Mats Malm; The external members Rebecka Kärde, Mikaela Blomqvist and Henrik Petersen at the 2019 Nobel Prize announcement; The meeting room for Swedish Academy members; and Permanent Secretary Peter Englund surrounded by the international media when announcing Mario Vargas Llosa as the 2010 Nobel laureate in Literature.
Permanent Secretary Peter Englund announcing Herta Müller as the 2009 Nobel laureate in Literature (left) and Permanent Secretary Sara Danius announcing the 2016 Nobel laureate in Literature: Bob Dylan (right).

The Nobel Committee for Literature is the Nobel Committee responsible for evaluating the nominations and presents its recommendations to the Swedish Academy, which then selects, through a vote, the Nobel Prize in Literature. The committee members – usually five – are elected for three years among the Swedish Academy members, with the Permanent Secretary serving as an associate member. In assessing the qualifications of candidates, the committee invites the assistance of specially appointed expert advisers, which include translators, literary critics, and linguists.

== Committee duties and deliberations ==
Every year in September, the Nobel Committee sends out nomination forms to hundreds of individuals and organizations qualified to nominate. Some uninvited nominations from other literary societies, academies, and individuals are also accepted. Such forms must be completed and submitted on or before January 31st, the Nobel Committee's deadline for submissions.

From February to April, the Nobel Committee screens the nominations and presents a list for approval by the Swedish Academy. Immediately after the nominees are approved, the Committee evaluates and creates a list of 25 to 20 candidates for preliminary evaluation. After the deliberations, the Committee selects five priority candidates that they thoroughly assess specifically on their body of literary work and merits. From June to August, each Committee member prepares their respective findings and criticisms of the candidates.

In September, the Academy members receive the Committee members' assessments of the finalists and discuss the literary merits of the different candidates' contributions. Within this month, the Committee again sends out nomination forms for the following year's deliberations. In October, days before the announcement, the Academy selects the Nobel laureate in Literature through votation. A candidate must receive more than half of the votes cast. It rarely happens that the Academy proposes another candidate aside from the Committee's finalists, which causes distress and conflicts among the members.

== Criterions for evaluating candidates ==
The Nobel committee says that literary quality is the main criterion for evaluating the candidates. An important criterion is universality, that the authors work retains its power beyond linguistic and cultural borders. Political or moral aspects are not taken in consideration, the candidates are only ever evaluated on their literary achievements.

In 2021 – the year when Tanzanian-born British author Abdulrazak Gurnah won the prize – Committee member Ellen Mattson was asked about what criteria the Committee uses in selecting a laureate, she responded saying:

"It's all about quality. Literary quality, of course. The winner needs to be someone who writes excellent literature. Someone who where you feel when you read that there's some kind of power, a development that lasts through books, all the books. But the world is full of very good, excellent writers, and you need something more to be a laureate. It's very difficult to explain what that is. It's something you're born with, I think. The romantics would call it a divine spark. For me, it's a voice that I hear in the writing that I find within this particular writer's work and nowhere else. And it's very difficult to explain what it is, but I always known when I find it. So it's something you're born with. A talent that gives that extra dimension to that particular writer's work."

Committee chair Anders Olsson also expressed his thoughts in October 2019 – the year American poet Louise Glück won – of what they look for writer worthy of becoming a Nobel laureate, saying:

"We do have criteria and the criteria have changed. Now we are looking much more for the global totality. I mean we have, really. It's necessary for us to widen our perspectives more and more. Previously we had a more, let's say, eurocentric perspective of literature and now we are looking all over the world. And also, previously, it was much more male-oriented. Now we have so many female writers that are really great. So the prize and the whole process with the prize has been intensified and is much more broader in its scope."

== Members ==
Since the establishment of the Nobel Committee, there have been 43 members of the Swedish Academy appointed. The longest serving member is Anders Österling who was a member of the Nobel committee for 60 years from 1921 to 1981. In 1983, Kerstin Ekman became the first woman to the appointed and since then had twelve women appointed. Controversially, two former committee members, Erik Axel Karlfeldt and Eyvind Johnson, were awarded a Nobel Prize in 1931 and 1974. In addition, Per Hallström and Henrik Schück were also nominated.

In addition to the Nobel Committee's work, a number of literary experts from different parts of world are appointed to the Nobel Institute to assist the Swedish Academy with opinions on nominated candidates.

On 19 November 2018, the Swedish Academy added five temporary external members to help its five-strong Nobel Committee in their deliberations for the 2019 and 2020 awards: author and literary translator Gun-Britt Sundström; publisher Henrik Petersen; and literary critics Mikaela Blomqvist, Rebecka Kärde and Kristoffer Leandoer. Just after two weeks, two of the newly added external members, Sundström and Leandoer, left the committee, with the latter saying the work to reform the scandal-hit Swedish Academy was taking too long. "I leave my job in the Nobel Committee because I have neither the patience nor the time to wait for the result of the work to change that has been started," Leandoer said.

Key
Current members in **bold**

Member	Start	End	Tenure (years)	Seat No.	Chair	Other roles and recognitions
Carl David af Wirsén	1900	1912		8	1901–1912	
Carl Snoilsky	1900	1903		10		
Clas Theodor Odhner	1900	1903		11		
Carl Rupert Nyblom	1900	1906		14		
Esaias Tegnér Jr.	1900	1920		9		
Hans Hildebrand	1903	1912		6	1912–1913	adjunct member (1901)
Karl Alfred Melin	1904	1919		13		
Erik Axel Karlfeldt	1907	1931		11		Nobel laureate (1931)
Harald Hjärne	1913	1921		10	1913–1922	
Per Hallström	1913	1946		14	1922–1946	Nobel nominee (1916, 1919, 1931)
Henrik Schück	1920	1936		3		Nobel nominee (1916, 1929)
Anders Österling	1921	1981		13	1946–1970	
Fredrik Böök	1929	1949		10		
Hjalmar Hammarskjöld	1932	1946		17		
Torsten Fogelqvist	1937	1940		11		
Sigfrid Siwertz	1942	1963		4		
Hjalmar Gullberg	1947	1961		7		
Eyvind Johnson	1959	1972		11		Nobel laureate (1974)
Henry Olsson	1960	1971		5		
Karl Ragnar Gierow	1963	1982		7	1971–1980	
Erik Lindegren	1964	1968		17		
Lars Gyllensten	1968	1987		14	1980–1987	
Artur Lundkvist	1969	1986		18		
Johannes Edfelt	1972	1987		17		
Östen Sjöstrand	1979	1990		8		
Kerstin Ekman	1983	1987		15		
Sture Allén	1987	1999		3		
Kjell Espmark	1988	2004		16	1987–2005	
Horace Engdahl	1997	2019		17		
Per Wästberg	1999	2023		12	2005–2018	
Katarina Frostenson	2002	2015		18		associate member (2015–2018)
Kristina Lugn	2008	2020		14		
Peter Englund	2009	2015		10		associate member (2009–2015)
Sara Danius	2015	2019		7		associate member (2015–2018)
Sara Stridsberg	2018	2018		13		associate member (2018)
Mats Malm	2018	2025		11		associate member (2018–2025)
Jesper Svenbro	2019	2021		8		
Kristoffer Leandoer	2018	2019		n/a		external member (2018)
Gun-Britt Sundström	2018	2019		n/a		external member (2018)
Henrik Petersen	2018	2021		n/a		external member (2018–2020)
Mikaela Blomqvist	2018	2021		n/a		external member (2018–2020)
Rebecka Kärde	2018	2021		n/a		external member (2018–2020)
**Anders Olsson**	2019			4	2018–	
**Anne Swärd**	2021			13		
**Ellen Mattson**	2021			9		
**Steve Sem-Sandberg**	2022			14		
**Anna-Karin Palm**	2024			16		
**Ingrid Carlberg**	2026			5		associate member (2026–)

=== Current members ===
The following Swedish Academy members form the current Nobel Committee for Literature since 2026:

**Committee Members**
Seat No.	Picture	Name	Elected	Position	Profession
4		Anders Olsson (b. 1949)	2008	committee chair	literary critic, literary historian
5		Ingrid Carlberg (b. 1961)	2020	associate member permanent secretary	author, journalist
9		Ellen Mattson (b. 1963)	2019	member	novelist, essayist
14		Steve Sem-Sandberg (b. 1958)	2021	member	journalist, author, translator
13		Anne Swärd (b. 1969)	2019	member	novelist
16		Anna-Karin Palm (b. 1961)	2023	member	novelist, culture writer
