= Charles Dédéyan =

- Born: 4 April 1910; Smyrna
- Died: 21 June 2003 (aged 93); Paris
- Occupation: Historian of French literature

Charles Dédéyan (4 April 1910 – 21 June 2003) was a French-Armenian Romance philologist, literature comparatist and specialist of French literature.

== Biography ==
Dédéyan defended his thesis at the Sorbonne (Montaigne dans le Romantisme anglo-saxon et ses prolongements victoriens, esquisse d'une histoire de sa fortune de 1760 à 1900). From 1942 he was a lecturer at the University of Rennes and from 1945 to 1949 professor at the University of Lyon. From 1949 he held the chair of Comparative Literatures at the Sorbonne.

Dédéyan won several prizes awarded by the Académie Française, including the Prix Broquette-Gonin (1962), the Prix du de la langue et de la littérature françaises (1967) and the Prix Gustave Le Métais-Larivière (1984). He was also an officier of the Légion d'honneur.

He is the father of historian Gérard Dédéyan.

== Works ==
- (direction d'ouvrage) Jean Mairet, La Sophonisbe, Paris 1945, 1969
- (direction d'ouvrage) Montaigne, Journal de voyage en Italie par la Suisse et l'Allemagne en 1580 et 1581, Paris 1946
- Le Thème de Faust dans la littérature européenne, 6 Bde., Paris 1954–1967
- Madame de Lafayette, Paris 1955, 1965
- Stendhal et les "Chroniques italiennes", Paris 1956
- Gérard de Nerval et l'Allemagne, 3 tomes, Paris 1957–1959
- Dante en Angleterre, 2 tomes, Paris 1961–1966
- Rilke et la France, 2 tomes, Paris 1961–1963
- Stendhal chroniqueur, Paris 1962
- L'Italie dans l'œuvre romanesque de Stendhal, 2 tomes, Paris 1963
- Victor Hugo et l'Allemagne, 2 tomes, Paris 1964–1965
- Le cosmopolitisme littéraire de Charles du Bos, 6 tomes, Paris 1965–1971
- Racine et sa "Phèdre", Paris 1965, 1978
- Lesage et "Gil Blas", Paris 1965, 2002
- Jean-Jacques Rousseau et la sensibilité littéraire à la fin du XVIIIe siècle, Paris 1966
- Le nouveau mal du siècle de Baudelaire à nos jours, 2 tomes, Paris 1968–1972
- Une guerre dans le mal des hommes, Paris 1971
- Chateaubriand et Rousseau, Paris 1973
- Le cosmopolitisme européen sous la Révolution et l'Empire, 2 tomes, Paris 1976
- Lamartine et la Toscane, Genève 1981
- Le Drame romantique en Europe. France, Angleterre, Allemagne, Italie, Espagne, Russie, Paris 1982
- Dante dans le romantisme anglais, Paris 1983
- Le Roman comique de Scarron, Paris 1983
- Le Critique en voyage ou Esquisse d'une histoire littéraire comparée, Paris 1985, 1998 (italien : Il critico in viaggio. Linee di storia letteraria comparata, Cesena 2000)
- Diderot et la pensée anglaise, Florence 1987
- Montesquieu ou l'alibi persan, Paris 1988
- Le Retour de Salente ou Voltaire et l'Angleterre, Paris 1988
- "La nouvelle Héloïse" de Jean-Jacques Rousseau. Étude d'ensemble, Paris 1990
- Montesquieu ou Les lumières d'Albion, Paris 1990
- "Télémaque" ou La liberté de l'esprit, Paris 1991
- "Polyeucte" ou Le cœur et la grâce, Paris 1992
- Lorelei ou L'enchanteur enchanté. Chateaubriand et le monde germanique, Paris 1993
- Stendhal captivé et captif ou Le mythe de la prison, Paris 1998
- Le chevalier berger ou De l'"Amadis" à l'"Astrée". Fortune, critique et création, Paris 2002
- J.-J. Rousseau: "La Nouvelle Héloïse" ou l'éternel retour, Saint Genouph 2002

== Bibliography ==
- De Shakespeare à Michel Butor. Mélanges offerts à Monsieur Charles Dédéyan, Paris 1985
- International perspectives in comparative literature. Essays in honor of Charles Dédéyan, sous la direction de Virginia M. Shaddy, Lewiston 1991
- Hommage à Charles Dédéyan, in: Revue de littérature comparée 336, 2010
- Qui est qui. XXe siècle, Levallois-Perret 2005 s.v.
