= Hans Galinsky =

German American studies scholar

Hans Galinsky (12 May 1909–25 July 1991) was a German American studies scholar.

== Life and career ==
Galinsky was a professor of comparative literature and American studies at the University of Mainz from 1952 to 1977. He co-founded the Deutsche Gesellschaft für Amerikastudien.

His monograph Naturae Cursus. Der Weg einer antiken kosmologischen Metapher von der Alten in die Neue Welt (1968) is about the expression naturae cursus or "of course" interpreted as a metaphor. Wegbereiter moderner amerikanischer Lyrik (1968) is about the interpretation and reception history of the poetry of Emily Dickinson and William Carlos Williams.

Since 1992, the Hans Galinsky Memorial Prize is awarded by the Center for Early American Studies of the University of Mainz.
