= Eyvind Johnson =

Swedish writer (1900–1976)

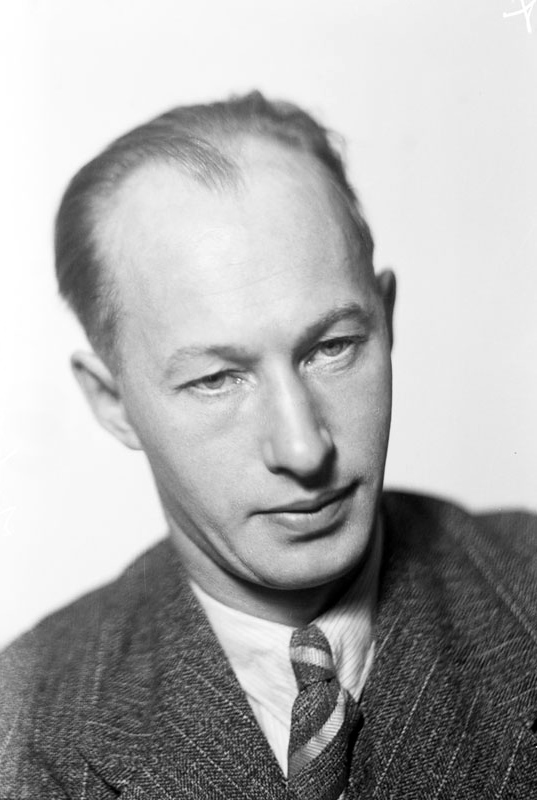
- Eyvind Johnson
- Born: Olof Edvin Verner Jonsson; 29 July 1900; Boden, Sweden
- Died: 25 August 1976 (aged 76); Stockholm, Sweden
- Spouses: Aase Christoffersen (1927–1938, her death); Cilla Johnson (1940–1978)
- Children: 3
- Writing career
- Period: 1924–1976
- Notable works: Here's Your Life; Return to Ithaca; The Days of His Grace
- Notable awards: Nobel Prize in Literature; 1974 (shared with Harry Martinson)
- Website: www.eyvindjohnson.se

Eyvind Johnson (29 July 1900 – 25 August 1976) was a Swedish novelist and short story writer. Regarded as the most groundbreaking novelist in modern Swedish literature he became a member of the Swedish Academy in 1957 and shared the 1974 Nobel Prize in Literature with Harry Martinson with the citation: for a narrative art, far-seeing in lands and ages, in the service of freedom.

== Biography ==
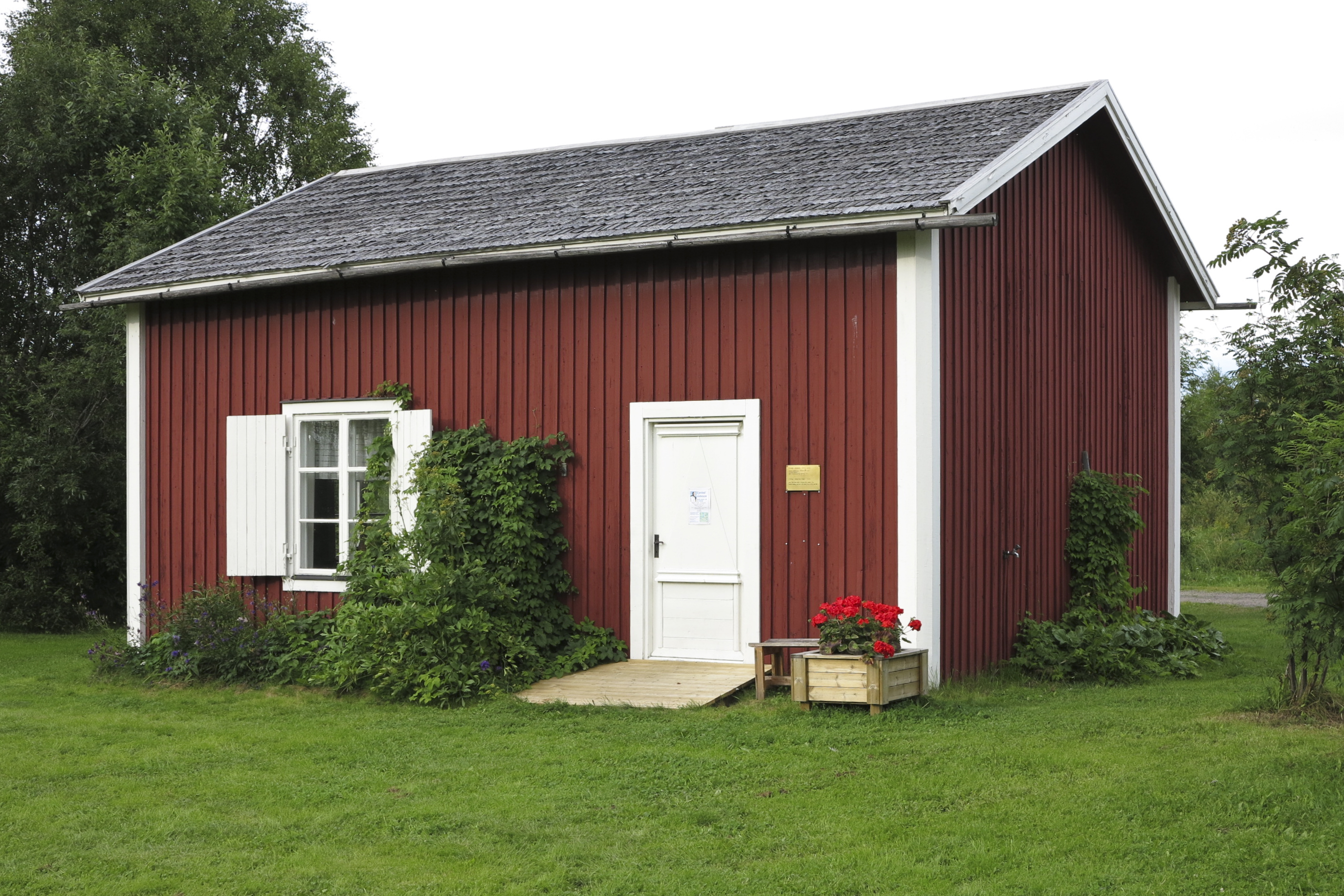
The house in Björkelund where Eyvind Johnson was born in 1900.

Johnson was born Olof Edvin Verner Jonsson 29 July 1900 in a village near the town of Boden in Norrbotten. The small house where he was born is preserved and marked with a commemorative plaque.

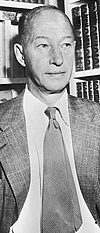

Johnson left school at the age of thirteen and then held various jobs such as log driving and working at a saw mill and as a ticket-seller and projectionist in a cinema. In 1919 he left his hometown and moved to Stockholm where he began to publish articles in anarchist magazines like Brand. In Stockholm he became friends with other young proletarian writers and started the magazine Vår nutid. He travelled in Germany in the 1920s and lived in Saint-Leu-la-Foret, near Paris, France, between 1927 and 1930 with his wife Aase Christoffersen (1900–1938). At this point he had published his first books. The first De fyra främlingarna, a collection of short stories, was published in 1924. Influenced by writers such as Marcel Proust, André Gide and James Joyce, Johnson gradually took distance from the traditional novel and became the most important representative of modernist literature in Sweden. Johnson's early novels were not widely read, but his 1929 novel Kommentar till ett stjärnfall ("Comment on a falling star"), an attack on capitalist society, was a critical success.

Johnson's first major success as a writer was four autobiographical novels published between 1934 and 1937, published together as Romanen om Olof ("The Novel about Olof"), about a young man growing up in the northern parts of Sweden. In the novels Johnson blended realism with fairy tales and typical modernist features such as inner monologue and changing point of view. Romanen om Olof became a classic in Swedish literature and was later filmed as Here Is Your Life.

Increasingly upset by the rising totalitarianism in the 1930s, Johnson was strongly against fascism and nazism. During World War II he was editor of the magazine Håndslag and published Krilon, a trilogy of novels that in the form of an allegory deals with the events during the war. In the novels Johnson condemns Nazi oppression and criticises the controversial Swedish neutrality policy during the war. Krilon is considered to be one of Johnson's best works. In the same period he was a member of the nationalist association Samfundet Nordens Frihet and among the contributors of its magazine, Nordens Frihet.

In 1946 he published one of his most famous novels, Return to Ithaca (Strändernas svall), based on the story of Odysseus as he returns to Ithaca after the Trojan war. Johnson married translator Cilla Johnson in 1940. He lived with his family in Switzerland 1947–1949 and then a year in England. Travels to Italy and France inspired him to write several well-received historical novels. Among the best known are Dreams of Roses and Fire (Drömmar om rosor och eld, 1949) set in Cardinal Richelieus 17th century France, and Molnen över Metapontion ("The Clouds above Metapontion", 1957) that typically for his later novels switches back and forth between different time levels.

Johnson's most noted works internationally include Return to Ithaca and The Days of His Grace (Hans nådes tid, 1960) which have been translated to many languages. For the latter novel Johnson was awarded the Nordic Council Literature Prize in 1962.

=== Member of the Swedish Academy and Nobel Prize in Literature ===
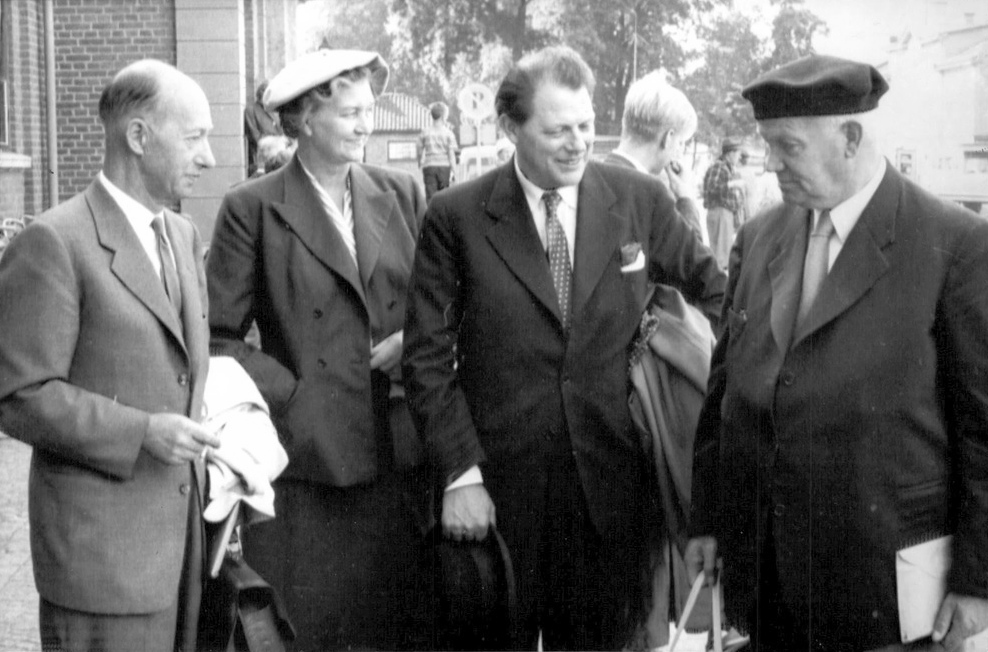
Eyvind Johnson (left) at a writers meeting in Karlstad in 1958, with authors Harry Martinson and Gabriel Jönsson and Jönsson's wife.

In 1957 Johnson was elected a member of the Swedish Academy. He was a member of the Nobel Committee for Literature between 1959 and 1972. Johnson nominated several authors that were subsequently awarded the prize, including the 1963 Nobel laureate Giorgos Seferis twice, in 1962 and the year Seferis won.

In 1974, Eyvind Johnson was awarded the 1974 Nobel Prize in Literature jointly with Harry Martinson. Johnson was awarded "for a narrative art, farseeing in lands and ages, in the service of freedom"

== Works ==
=== Novels ===
- Timans och rättfärdigheten (1925)
- Stad i mörker (1927)
- Stad i ljus (1928)
- Minnas (1928)
- Kommentar till ett stjärnfall (1929)
- Avsked till Hamlet (1930)
- Bobinack (1932)
- Regn i gryningen (1933)
- Romanen om Olof (1934-1937, published together in 1945)
  - Nu var det 1914 (1934)
  - Här har du ditt liv! (1935)
  - Se dig inte om! (1936)
  - Slutspel i ungdomen (1937)
- Nattövning (1938)
- Soldatens återkomst (1940)
- Krilon (1941-1943, published together in 1948)
  - Grupp Krilon (1941)
  - Krilons resa (1942)
  - Krilon själv (1943)
- Return to Ithaca (Swedish: Strändernas svall, 1946)
- Dreams of Roses and Fire (Drömmar om rosor och eld, 1949)
- Lägg undan solen (1951)
- Romantisk berättelse (1953)
- Tidens gång (1955)
- Molnen över Metapontion (1957)
- The Days of His Grace (Swedish: Hans nådes tid, 1960)
- Livsdagen lång (1964)
- Favel ensam (1968)
- Några steg mot tystnaden (1973)
- Herr Clerk vår mästare (original version of Minnas, novel, 1998)

=== Short story collections ===
- De fyra främlingarna (1924)
- Natten är här (1932)
- Än en gång, kapten! (1934)
- Den trygga världen (1940)
- Sju liv (1944)
- Pan mot Sparta (1946)
- Olibrius och gestalterna (1986)

=== Plays ===
- Return to Ithaca (Swedish: Strändernas svall, 1948)

=== Nonfiction ===
- Dagbok från Schweiz (1949)
- Vinterresa i Norrbotten (1955)
- Vägar över Metaponto – en resedagbok (1959)
- Spår förbi Kolonos – en berättelse (1961)
- Stunder, vågor – anteckningar, berättelser (1965)
- Resa i hösten 1921 (1973)

Cultural offices
Preceded by Nils Ahnlund	Swedish Academy, Seat No.11; 1957–1976	Succeeded by Ulf Linde
