= Fryda Schultz de Mantovani =

Argentine writer of children's stories

- Born: Fryda Schultz; December 19, 1912
- Died: April 10, 1978 (aged 65)
- Occupation: Writer
- Spouse: Juan Mantovani
- Writing career
- Genre: Children’s

Fryda Schultz de Mantovani (1912–1978) was an Argentine writer, researcher, literary critic and teacher.

== Early life ==
Fryda Schultz de Mantovani was born in Morón, Buenos Aires on 19 December 1912. She married the writer and educationalist, Juan Mantovani.

== Writing career ==
Most of Schultz de Mantovani's writing was for children. Her work reflects her Argentine childhood and youth. In 1934, she published Los títeres de Maese Pedro (Master Pedro's puppets) and, in 1935, Marioneta (Puppet). As a children's playwright, she wrote El árbol guarda-voces (The Voice-guard tree), which was inspired by the tradition of classical Spanish religious theatre. Other children's plays included El hijo de paja (The son of straw), Cuento para la Noche de Nöel (Story for Nöel's Night) and Mamá mazapán (Mama marzipan).

With her husband, she was part of the intellectual milieu linked to education, art and Argentine politics. In 1956, they were both members of the jury at the National University of Córdoba, which selected María Luisa Cresta de Leguizamón to be chair of Hispano-American Literature. Schultz de Mantovani was a member of the Committee of Sur Magazine, the literary magazine founded by Victoria Ocampo.

As a literary critic she wrote a series of essays on her favourite writers of stories read by children, such as Giambattista Basile, Charles Perrault, Hans Christian Andersen, the Brothers Grimm and Jules Verne. She also published books of children's poetry, such as Navegante, Fábula del niño en el hombre (Fable of the child in man), and a work entitled El mundo poetico infantil. She also wrote Cuentos para después (Tales for Later) and published the anthologies Cuentos infantiles de América (Children's Tales of America) and Algo más de cien libros para niños (Just over a hundred books for children). She edited the children's magazine Mundo Infantil, which was widely distributed in the 1950s.

== Death ==
Schultz de Mantovani died on 10 April 1978. In 1979 Sur published Fryda. Homenaje de sus amigos (Fryda. Tribute by her friends) with contributions by Victoria Ocampo, who highlighted her work on the magazine, Enrique Anderson Imbert, Eduardo González Lanuza, Leda Valladares, Mildred Adams and others.

== Legacy ==
She is remembered in Argentina by several buildings and streets named after her, including:

- Library "Fryda Schultz de Mantovani", of the Provincial School of Visual Arts "Juan Mantovani", in Santa Fe.
- Kindergarten Nº936 "Fryda Schultz De Mantovani", in La Plata.
- JIC No. 3 "Fryda Schultz de Mantovani", a school in Buenos Aires.
- Calle "Fryda Schultz de Mantovani", a street located in Santa Fe.
