= Henri Peyre =

American linguist

Henri Maurice Peyre (21 February 1901 – 9 December 1988) was a French-born American linguist, literary scholar and Sterling Professor of French Emeritus at Yale University.

Peyre graduated from the École Normale Superieure and the Sorbonne and received his PhD from the Universite de Paris. In 1925 he started teaching at Bryn Mawr College, ten miles west of Philadelphia. From 1933 to 1938 he was professor of French literature at the Egyptian University in Cairo, and from 1938 to 1969 he was Sterling Professor of French at Yale University. Upon mandatory retirement at age 68 from Yale in 1969 to his retirement in 1980, he was Distinguished Professor at the City University of New York Graduate Center.

In 1930 Peyre was awarded a Guggenheim Fellowship. He was elected to the American Philosophical Society in 1953. In 1954 he received a grant from the American Council of Learned Societies to do research for his next book. He was elected to the American Academy of Arts and Sciences in 1957 and, in 1963, he was a member of the National Commission on the Humanities. In France he was made officer of the Légion d'Honneur.

== Publications ==
Peyre wrote about 30 books about classicism, modern literature, and higher education. A selection:

- 1932. Louis Ménard
- 1955. The Contemporary French Novel
- 1962. Essays on English and American literature With Leo Spitzer, and A. Hatcher.
- 1963. Literature and sincerity
- 1967. French Novelists of Today. New York: Oxford UP,
- 1968. Jean-Paul Sartre
- 2005. Henri Peyre: His Life in Letters. With John W. Kneller and Mario Maurin eds.

Articles, a selection

- 1953. "Exile by Saint-John Perse", Shenandoah, Lexington, vol. V, Winter 1953
- 1964. "André Malraux and the Arts " The Baltimore Museum of Art: Baltimore, Maryland, 1964

== See also ==
- André Malraux
