= Return to Ithaca (novel) =

1946 novel by Eyvind Johnson

Return to Ithaca: A Novel about the Present
- Cover of first edition
- Author: Eyvind Johnson
- Original title: Strändernas svall
- Language: Swedish
- Genre: Parallel novel, Greek mythology retelling
- Set in: Ancient Greece, Mediterranean
- Published: 1946
- Publisher: Bonniers
- Publication place: Sweden

Return to Ithaca: A Novel about the Present (Swedish: Strändernas svall: En roman om det närvarande) (Note: A literal translation of the main title Strändernas svall is 'The Surge of the Shores'.) is a 1946 novel by Swedish author Eyvind Johnson. It is based on Homer's story of Odysseus as he returns home to Ithaca after the Trojan War.

The plot recounts the events surrounding the Greek hero Odysseus, his journey home from the Trojan War, his wife Penelope's waiting for him, and his son Telemachos's eagerness to meet his father.

On its publication, homerologists objected to the novel's modern naturalistic scene description, and its anti-heroic presentation, but it was praised by Swedish literary critics. More recently, scholars have explored the tension between the fictional narrator's subjective experience and the described reality, and the issue of violence. They have noted the novel's structure with parallel events, a metafiction and a narrative in Johnson's own time just after the Second World War.

In 2013, the SVT program Babel named it one of five classic works of Swedish literature that should form the start of a Swedish literary canon. It has been published in many editions and translated into approximately twenty languages.

== Plot ==
Odysseus is ruler of the island of Ithaca. Nineteen years earlier, he left his wife Penelope and his son Telemachus to join the Greek forces attacking Troy. The war went on for ten years, and on the way home Odysseus was delayed by many mishaps. He fetches up on an island where the nymph Calypso lives, and stays there for seven years. In Ithaca, Penelope hesitates to remarry. She is courted by a large number of suitors whom she puts off by saying that she cannot make a decision until she has finished weaving a bedspread for her father-in-law. She weaves every day, but unpicks most of the weaving again at night. At the same time, Telemachus has begun to find out about his father. Odysseus is visited by the messenger of the gods, Hermes, who orders him to return home. Reluctantly, Odysseus sets off to sail to Ithaca, but is shipwrecked and washed ashore on a coast ruled by Alkinoos. His daughter Nausikaa discovers Odysseus and brings him to the king's court. After Odysseus's poignant account of his adventures, he sails back to Ithaca. Disguised as a beggar, he arrives on the island; he meets the swineherd Eumaios who persuades him that he must deal with his wife's suitors and kill them.

== Narrative style ==
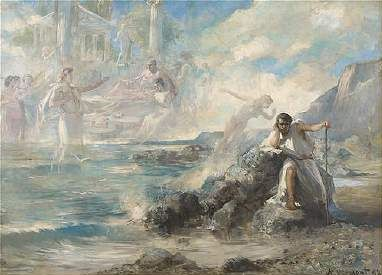
The novel is based on Homer's Odyssey. Painting Ulysses' Dream by Nicolae Vermont, 1893

Return to Ithaca is based on Homer's The Odyssey, but differs from the original, in Örjan Lindberger's view, in that Johnson has added a psychological dimension where the main characters' thoughts and doubts are depicted, among other things through inner monologues. The story alludes to contemporary times and the experiences of the Second World War. Lindberger writes that the novel has an ingeniously executed composition consisting of three simultaneous narratives. The first has Odysseus as the travelling protagonist, the second centres around Penelope at home in Ithaca, and the third revolves around Telemachus. The events in these three threads partially interfere with each other and finally run together. With the narrative approach, in Lindberger's view, Johnson strove for a sense of simultaneity in these events and an opportunity to see the whole of reality at once, with all its complications. This was a narrative style that Johnson later developed further in his novels.

== Reception ==
=== Contemporary ===
The book was published in the late autumn of 1946. It was criticised by homerologists, who objected to the amount of modern naturalistic scene description, and the anti-heroic presentation. On the other hand, it was praised by Sweden's leading critics. Sten Selander in Svenska Dagbladet wrote that "Nowhere has Eyvind Johnson's storytelling gift been given freer rein than here; and never before has he given more convincing proof that he is the only genius among the prose writers of his generation."

Anders Österling in Stockholms-Tidningen described it as "a significant work, without any question one of the boldest approaches in our new art of storytelling". Karl Vennberg in Aftontidningen found that the author had set out and almost succeeded in a paradoxical task: "The elevated must remain elevated but still be lowered to an everyday plane; the supernatural must be connected to a chain of cause and effect without ceasing to be impenetrable and marvellous; the timeless must be coloured by the present without losing its character of timelessness." Vennberg also praised the style, the joy of storytelling, the portrayal of people and above all the moral exploration.

Outside Sweden, Philip Burnham in The New York Times wrote that "If Homer makes the Trojan Expedition the greatest and most heroic war of history, Eyvind Johnson makes the decade following, when Odysseus was wandering home, an almost proportionate post-war depression."

=== Retrospective ===
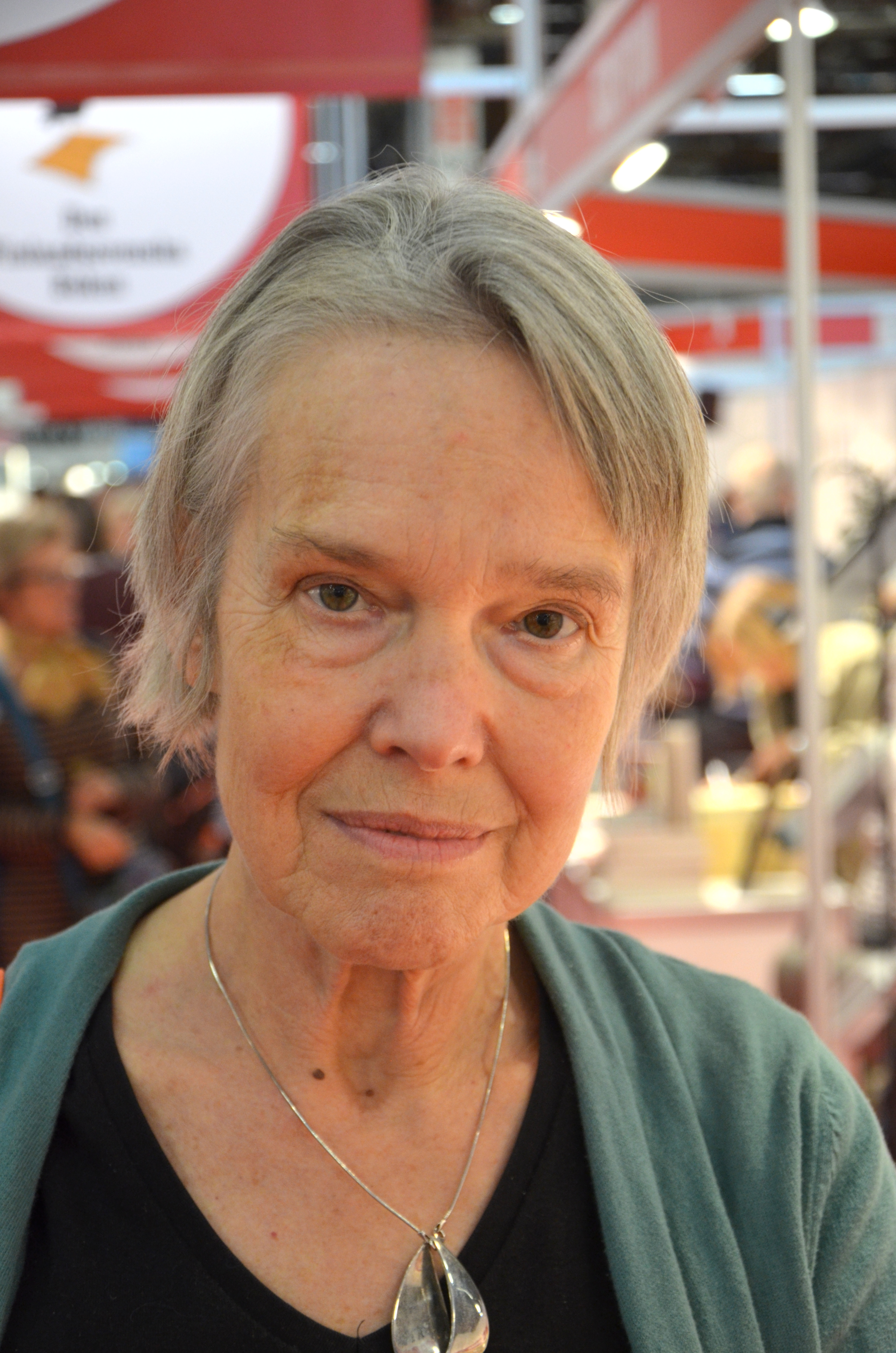
Merete Mazzarella analyses the role of the narrator in the novel, and its exploration of violence.

In 1981, Merete Mazzarella's book Myt och verklighet. Berättandets problem i Eyvind Johnsons roman 'Strändernas svall' examined in detail Johnson's treatment of the homeric myth of Odysseus. She explores Johnson's recurring theme of escape and return home, seeking to demonstrate how the fictional narrator has to escape from subjective experience using myth, so as to share his vision with his readers. Mazzarella comments that there is a tension between the described reality and the escaped. To make the case for this "dynamic tension", she analyses the importance of the Odysseus myth to Johnson's writing; Johnson's own statements about myth and reality in his writing; and twentieth century views of myth by writers such as the folklorist James George Frazer, the psychoanalysts Sigmund Freud and Carl Jung, and the novelist Thomas Mann, all of whom influenced Johnson. Johnson's Odysseus is presented as Frazer's mythical archetype of the fated hero, but also a self-consciously Freudian figure full of memories, dreams, and reflections. In Monica Setterwall's view, the core of Mazzarella's thesis is the way the narrators - both the explicit narrator, and Odysseus himself as he tells his tale to the Phaeacians - help to unpick the issue of violence, ending with Odysseus's killing of Penelope's suitors. Odysseus makes his experiences into a myth, while the narrator breaks up the myth, necessarily making Odysseus an anti-hero, to discover the ancient reality that applies in modern times. Among the ironies and the illusions of heroism are that Odysseus went to war to protect Ithaca, but that he comes home bringing violence to re-establish peace and order. Mazzarella links this to Johnson's post-Second World War Sweden, and suggests a humanistic resolution as Telemachos reacts to Nestor's cup, a symbol of both grief and longing.

More recently, Elisabeth Nordgren, writing in Lysmasken, describes the book as bringing Odysseus into the modern age, its subtitle "A novel about present time" emphasising its contemporary focus. In her view, the novel turns the hero into an insecure homesick warrior. She writes that it describes Odysseus's long complicated homeward journey, his wife Penelope's long wait on the home island, and his son Telemachus's feelings. She calls the novel's structure interesting, with its simultaneous and parallel events in somewhat mythic style, a "metafiction" and a narrative in Johnson's own time. She considers it both a rewarding book and an "excellent gateway" to Johnson's writing.

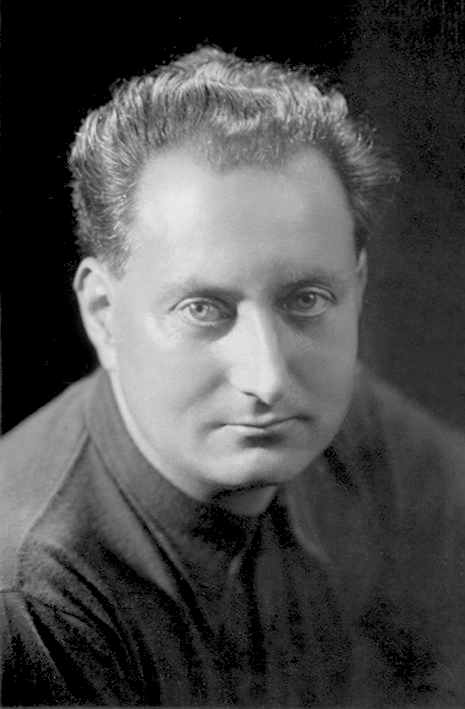
Cyrille François contrasts Johnson's retelling with Jean Giono's (pictured).

Cyrille François, in Revue de Littérature Comparée, compares Johnson's treatment of Odysseus's deceitfulness with Jean Giono's 1930 Naissance de l'Odyssée on the same subject; Giono had kept a copy of the Odyssey with him throughout his time in the First World War trenches. François writes that both Johnson and Giono were self-taught but not quite part of their countries' proletarian movements; and both enter into a dialogue with Homer's text, and an intertextual dialogue with earlier criticisms of Homer. Giono's retelling is in his view a "deheroization" of the tale, making Odysseus a liar. In contrast, the Odyssey was not a key text in Swedish literature before Johnson; instead, Johnson read in other languages, including James Joyce's Ulysses. Johnson's Odysseus, François writes, is not a liar but a disenchanted hero who sees that the Trojan War was pointless. Where Giono's Odysseus speaks easily, with no effort to create a story, Johnson's protagonist feels forced to speak, and has to try to make the tale credible and interesting to his listeners (first Calypso, who almost psychoanalyses him, then the Phaeacians), without making it too painful for himself. Both Giono and Johnson question the Odyssey: Giono to rebut Homer and show how an ordinary man can creatively weave a myth of his own heroism; Johnson to show an introspective Odysseus disguising and embellishing the truth, caught between remembering and forgetting.

The classicist Scott D. Richardson calls the book an "excellent novel", writing that "Johnson's fascinating alterations and embellishments actually draw out features in Homer’s portrayal that can shed rich insight into the characters and plotlines of the epic." In his view, the book offers "a fresh and penetrating exploration of the principal characters compatible with both the ancient epic and the post-WWII world." He notes that other authors have usually covered just one part of Odysseus's life, sometimes outside the Odyssey. Like Margaret Atwood, in her Penelopiad (which takes Penelope's viewpoint from Ithaca), Johnson covers "the same ground as Homer". But unlike Atwood, Johnson stays true, in Richardson's view, to the original characters and tone, illuminating rather than overriding Homer. He comments that Johnson is gloomier than Homer, working from hints in the original that some readers might ignore, and matching the 20th century situation.

In 2013, a panel of writers on the SVT program Babel named it one of only five classic books that should form the start of a Swedish literary canon. (Note: The other books were Vilhelm Moberg's Utvandrarepos, Kerstin Thorvall's Det mest förbjudna, Tove Jansson's Pappan och havet, and Hjalmar Bergman's Farmor och vår herre.) It has been published in many editions and translated into approximately twenty languages.

== Adaptations ==
In 1948, Johnson published a theatre version Strändernas svall: ett drama i tre akter och ett antal bilder om den återvändande. Teater Indra put on a production of the play in 1992 in Gothenburg's Hagabadet.

For Johnson's centenary, Vadstena Academy put on Reine Jönsson's opera Strändernas svall in Vadstena Castle, based on the novel. The opera was directed by Patrik Sörling, with libretto by Magnus Carlbring.

== Sources ==
- Lindberger, Örjan (1990). Människan i tiden: Eyvind Johnsons liv och författarskap 1938-1976 [Man in time: Eyvind Johnson's life and authorship 1938-1976] (in Swedish). Stockholm: Bonnier. ISBN 91-0-047904-7.
- Mazzarella, Merete (1981). Myt och verklighet: Berättandets problem i Eyvind Johnsons roman Strändernas svall [Myth and Reality. The Problem of Storytelling in Eyvind Johnson's Novel 'Return to Ithaca']. Diss. Skrifter utgivna av Svenska litteratursällskapet i Finland, 497 (in Swedish). Helsinki: Svenska litteratursällskapet i Finland. ISBN 951-9017-66-6.
