= 1960 Nobel Prize in Literature =

- Saint-John Perse
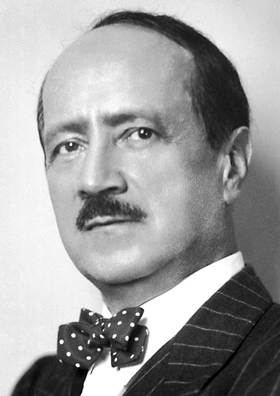
- "for the soaring flight and the evocative imagery of his poetry which in a visionary fashion reflects the conditions of our time."
- Date: 26 October 1960 (announcement); 10 December 1960 (ceremony)
- Location: Stockholm, Sweden
- Presented by: Swedish Academy
- First award: 1901
- Website: Official website

The 1960 Nobel Prize in Literature was awarded to the French poet Saint-John Perse (1887–1975) "for the soaring flight and the evocative imagery of his poetry which in a visionary fashion reflects the conditions of our time"

== Laureate ==
Sain-John Perse, pseudonym for Alexis Leger, was born in Pointe-à-Pitre, Guadeloupe, where his family owned two plantations: a coffee and a sugar plantation. His family went back to France in 1899 and settled in Pau. In 1911, he published his first poetry collection Éloges and Other Poems which was almost completely ignored at the time, and one of the few writers who paid it any attention was Marcel Proust, who praised him as a creative young poet, but afterwards, in 1912, he started earning steady success with the help of Valery Larbaud and André Gide. His poetry, admired especially by literary circles, has been compared to that of Arthur Rimbaud. In 1914, he joined the French diplomatic service and spent many years abroad in various countries. While working as a consul in China, he wrote Anabase ("Anabasis", 1924), an epic poem that puzzled many critics. In 1940, he began a long exile in the U.S. in Washington, D.C. wherein much of his poetry has a profoundly personal tone, as in Exil (1942; "Exile"), Vents (1946; "Winds") and Amers (1957; "Seamarks").

== Deliberations ==
=== Nominations ===
Saint-John Perse was nominated for the prize 15 times, including one nomination by 1937 Nobel laureate Roger Martin du Gard in 1956 and three nominations by the 1948 Nobel Prize laureate T. S. Eliot in 1955, 1958 and 1960.

In total, the Nobel committee received 70 nominations including nominations for 58 authors, including Ivo Andrić (awarded in 1961), John Steinbeck (awarded in 1962), Jean-Paul Sartre (awarded in 1964), Robert Frost, André Malraux, Romulo Gallegos, Aldous Huxley, Louis Aragon, Johan Falkberget, Karl Jaspers, Martin Heidegger, Alberto Moravia, Ignazio Silone, Ezra Pound, Julien Gracq, E. M. Forster, Ramón Menéndez Pidal, Sarvepalli Radhakrishnan, Junichiro Tanizaki, Miguel Torga and Tarjei Vesaas. Fourteen of the nominees were newly nominated namely Heinrich Böll (awarded in 1972), Wesley LaViolette, Aquilino Ribeiro, Marie Noël, Jean Price-Mars, James Thurber, Franz Theodor Csokor, Stratis Myrivilis, Elias Venezis, Aksel Sandemose, John Boyton Priestley and René Char. There were only four women nominated namely Maria Dąbrowska, Marie Noël, Juana de Ibarbourou and Karen Blixen.

The authors Sibilla Aleramo, Vicki Baum, Ya'akov Cahan, Ralph Chubb, Hjalmar Dahl, Harold Lenoir Davis, Leonora Eyles, Paul Fort, Ethel Voynich, Ferdynand Goetel, Sigurd Hoel, Zora Neale Hurston, Raïssa Maritain, John P. Marquand, Elsie J. Oxenham, Pierre Reverdy, Nevil Shute, Tetsuro Watsuji and Richard Wright died in 1960 without having been nominated for the prize.

Official list of nominees and their nominators for the prize
No.	Nominee	Country	Genre(s)	Nominator(s)
1	Ivo Andrić (1892–1975)	Yugoslavia	novel, short story, poetry	Eyvind Johnson (1900–1976); Harry Martinson (1904–1978); Association of Writers of Yugoslavia
2	Louis Aragon (1897–1982)	France	novel, short story, poetry, essays	Henry Olsson (1896–1985)
3	Werner Bergengruen (1892–1964)	West Germany	novel, short story, poetry	Wolfgang Stammler (1886–1965)
4	Karen Blixen (1885–1962)	Denmark	novel, short story, memoir	Günther Jungbluth (1912–1976)
5	Heinrich Böll (1917–1985)	West Germany	novel, short story	Gustav Korlén (1915–2014)
6	René Char (1907–1988)	France	poetry	Georges Blin (1917–2005)
7	Franz Theodor Csokor (1885–1969)	Austria	drama, essays, poetry, autobiography	The Austrian PEN-Club
8	Maria Dąbrowska (1889–1965)	Poland	novel, short story, essays, drama, literary criticism	The Polish PEN-Club
9	Henry de Montherlant (1895–1972)	France	essays, novel, drama	Henri Morier (1910–2004)
10	Gonzague de Reynold (1880–1970)	Switzerland	history, essays, biography, memoir	Swiss Writers Association
11	Johan Falkberget (1879–1967)	Norway	novel, short story, essays	Johannes Andreasson Dale (1898–1975); Harald Bayer (1891–1960); Hans Heiberg (1904–1978); Kristian Smidt (1916–2013)
12	Edward Morgan Forster (1879–1970)	United Kingdom	novel, short story, drama, essays, biography, literary criticism	Eyvind Johnson (1900–1976)
13	Robert Frost (1874–1963)	United States	poetry, drama	Walter Havighurst (1901–1994); Nils Erik Enkvist (1925–2009); Hans Galinsky (1909–1991)
14	Christopher Fry (1907–2005)	United Kingdom	poetry, drama, screenplay	Arthur Henkel (1915–2005)
15	Rómulo Gallegos (1884–1969)	Venezuela	novel, short story	Several South American proposers; The Brazilian PEN-Club
16	Armand Godoy (1880–1964)	Cuba; France	poetry, translation	Anna Hyatt Huntington (1876–1973)
17	Julien Gracq (1910–2007)	France	novel, poetry, drama, literary criticism	Eyvind Johnson (1900–1976)
18	Robert Graves (1895–1985)	United Kingdom	history, novel, poetry, literary criticism, essays	Johannes Edfelt (1904–1997); Johannes Andreasson Dale (1898–1975)
19	Graham Greene (1904–1991)	United Kingdom	novel, short story, autobiography, essays	Kristian Smidt (1916–2013)
20	Gunnar Gunnarsson (1889–1975)	Iceland	novel, short story, poetry	Stellan Arvidson (1902–1997)
21	Martin Heidegger (1889–1976)	West Germany	philosophy, essays	Paul Böckmann (1899–1987)
22	Taha Hussein (1889–1973)	Egypt	novel, short story, poetry, translation	Olle Hedberg (1899–1974)
23	Aldous Huxley (1894–1963)	United Kingdom	novel, short story, essays, poetry, screenplay, drama, philosophy	R. Fricker (–)
24	Juana de Ibarbourou (1892–1979)	Uruguay	poetry, essays	Academia Cubana de la Lengua
25	Karl Jaspers (1883–1969)	West Germany; Switzerland	philosophy	Hermann Kasack (1896–1966); Erich Kästner (1899–1974)
26	Miroslav Krleža (1893–1981)	Yugoslavia	poetry, drama, short story, novel, essays	Association of Writers of Yugoslavia
27	Wesley LaViolette (1894–1978)	United States	poetry, essays	Vinayaka Krishna Gokak (1909–1992)
28	Wilhelm Lehmann (1882–1968)	Venezuela; West Germany	novel, short story, poetry, essays	Friedrich Sengle (1909–1994)
29	André Malraux (1901–1976)	France	novel, essays, literary criticism	Claude Digeon (1920–2008)
30	Max Mell (1882–1971)	Austria	drama, novel, screenplay	Otto Höfler (1901–1987); Rudolf Jagoditsch (1892–1976)
31	Ramón Menéndez Pidal (1869–1968)	Spain	philology, history	Academia Argentina de Letras; Jules Horrent (1920–1981); Gunnar Tilander (1894–1973)
32	Alberto Moravia (1907–1990)	Italy	novel, literary criticism, essays, drama	Eyvind Johnson (1900–1976)
33	Stratis Myrivilis (1890–1969)	Greece	novel, short story	The Greek Authors' Union
34	Junzaburō Nishiwaki (1894–1982)	Japan	poetry, literary criticism	Naoshirō Tsuji (1899–1979)
35	Marie Noël (1883–1967)	France	poetry, autobiography	Maurice Bémol (1900–1961)
36	Saint-John Perse (1887–1975)	France	poetry	Thomas Stearns Eliot (1888–1965); Eyvind Johnson (1900–1976)
37	Ezra Pound (1885–1972)	United States	poetry, essays	Ingvar Andersson (1899–1974)
38	Jean Price-Mars (1876–1969)	Haiti	essays, philosophy	Henri Daniel-Rops (1901–1965); Georges Duhamel (1884–1966)
39	John Boynton Priestley (1894–1984)	United Kingdom	novel, drama, screenplay, literary criticism, essays	G. Wilson Knight (1897–1985)
40	Sarvepalli Radhakrishnan (1888–1975)	India	philosophy, essays, law	Nirmal Kumar Sidhanta (1929–2014)
41	Aquilino Ribeiro (1885–1963)	Portugal	novel, short story, biography, literary criticism, memoir, translation	Sociedade Portuguesa de Autores
42	Mario Roques (1875–1961)	Peru; France	history, philology, essays	Ida-Marie Frandon (1907–1997)
43	Aksel Sandemose (1899–1965)	Denmark; Norway	novel, essays	Eyvind Johnson (1900–1976)
44	Jean-Paul Sartre (1905–1980)	France	philosophy, novel, drama, essays, screenplay	Kristian Smidt (1916–2013)
45	Rudolf Alexander Schröder (1878–1962)	West Germany	poetry, songwriting, translation	Erich Kästner (1899–1974)
46	Ignazio Silone (1900–1978)	Italy	novel, short story, essays, drama	Eyvind Johnson (1900–1976)
47	John Steinbeck (1902–1968)	United States	novel, short story, screenplay	Henry Olsson (1896–1985)
48	Jules Supervielle (1884–1960)	France; Uruguay	poetry, novel, short story	Jean Fabre (1904–1974)
49	Jun'ichirō Tanizaki (1886–1965)	Japan	novel, short story	Sigfrid Siwertz (1882–1970)
50	Herman Teirlinck (1879–1967)	Belgium	novel, poetry, essays, drama	Theodor Frings (1886–1968)
51	James Thurber (1894–1961)	United States	essays, short story, drama	Robert Henry Elias (1914–2008); Arthur Mizener (1907–1988); Stephen Emerson Whicher (1915–1961)
52	Miguel Torga (1907–1995)	Portugal	poetry, short story, novel, drama, autobiography	Several professors; Émile Planchard (1905–1990)
53	George Macauley Trevelyan (1876–1962)	United Kingdom	biography, autobiography, essays, history	Harry Martinson (1904–1978)
54	Elias Venezis (1904–1973)	Greece	novel, short story	Stylianos Kapsomenos (1907–1978); Nikolaos Andriōtēs (1906–1976); Emmanuel Kriaras (1906–2014); The Greek Authors' Union
55	Tarjei Vesaas (1897–1970)	Norway	poetry, novel	Sigmund Skard (1903–1995)
56	Simon Vestdijk (1898–1971)	Netherlands	novel, poetry, essays, translation	Sigfrid Siwertz (1882–1970)
57	Heimito von Doderer (1896–1966)	Austria	novel, short story, poetry, essays	Ernst Alker (1895–1972)
58	Karl Heinrich Waggerl (1897–1973)	Austria	novel, short story, poetry, essays	Friedrich Wild (1888–1966)

== Prize decision ==
The main contenders for the 1960 Nobel Prize in Literature were Saint-John Perse, who had been nominated by the 1948 Nobel laureate T. S. Eliot, and the Yugoslavian author Ivo Andrić. The members of the Nobel committee were divided between the candidates. Committee chairman Anders Österling and Sigfrid Siwertz supported a prize to Ivo Andrić, while Eyvind Johnson and Henry Olsson advocated a prize to Saint-John Perse. Österling found Perse a worthy candidate but a too esoteric poet with "a resonance that is too limited to be appropriately made the subject of a global award such as the Nobel Prize." Olsson, on the other hand, in comparing the two candidates, found that Perse in almost every aspect appeared "as Andrić's opposite and is as global as the other is regional". Olsson and Johnson also argued that Perse was well known and widely acknowledged as a great poet. Österling unsuccessfully argued for a prize to Ivo Andrić, noting the Yugoslav author's "mastered style" that would open "a previously unknown page in the world chronicle and appeals to us from the depths of the tormented national soul", adding that a prize to Andrić would also have the advantage of correcting "the justified criticism of the geographical distribution of the Nobel Prize in Literature.” Andrić was subsequently awarded the prize the following year.

== Award ceremony ==
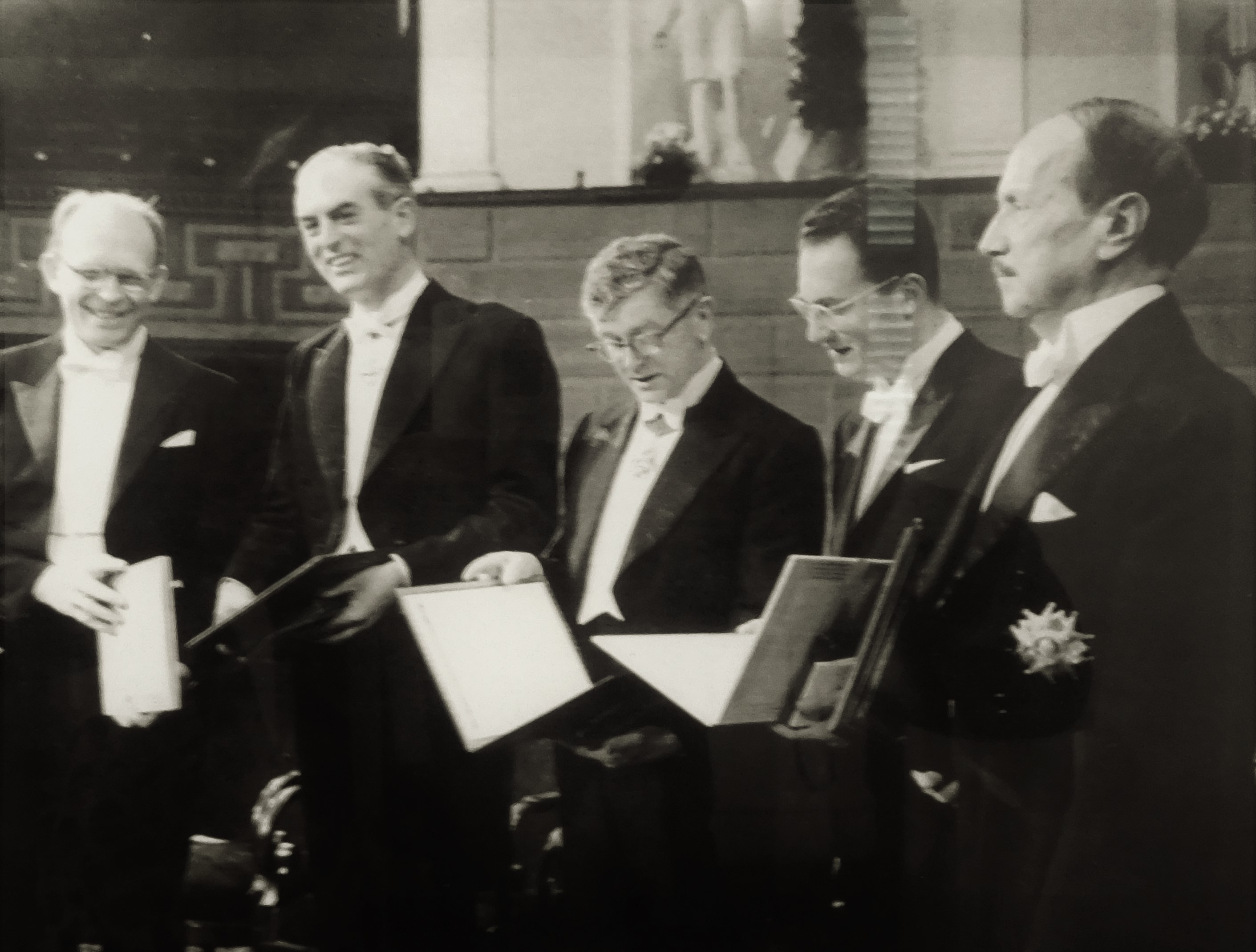
Saint-John Perse (right) at the award ceremony in Stockholm on 10 December 1960.

At the award ceremony in Stockholm on 10 December 1960, Anders Österling, permanent secretary of the Swedish Academy, said:

One can only admire the integrity of his poetic attitude, the lofty insistence with which he perseveres in the only mode of expression that allows him to realize his intentions, an exclusive but always pertinent form. The inexhaustible luxuriance of the picturesque style of his rhapsodies is intellectually demanding and may weary the reader of whom the poet demands such efforts of concentration. He takes his metaphors from all disciplines, from all eras, from all mythologies, from all regions; his cycles of poems call to mind those great sea shells from which a cosmic music seems to emanate. This expansive imagination is his strength. Exile, separation – evocations whose voiceless murmur gives his poetry its general tonality; and through the double theme of man’s strength and helplessness a heroic appeal can be perceived, an appeal which is perhaps expressed more distinctly than before in the poet’s latest work, Chronique (Chronicle), 1960, filled with a breath of grandeur, in which the poet recapitulates everything, at the end of the day, while making veiled allusions to the present state of the world. And he even makes a prophetic appeal to Europe to have it consider this fateful moment, this turning point in the course of history. The poem ends with these words: “Great age, here we are. Take measure of the heart of man”.
