= 1961 Nobel Prize in Literature =

- Ivo Andrić
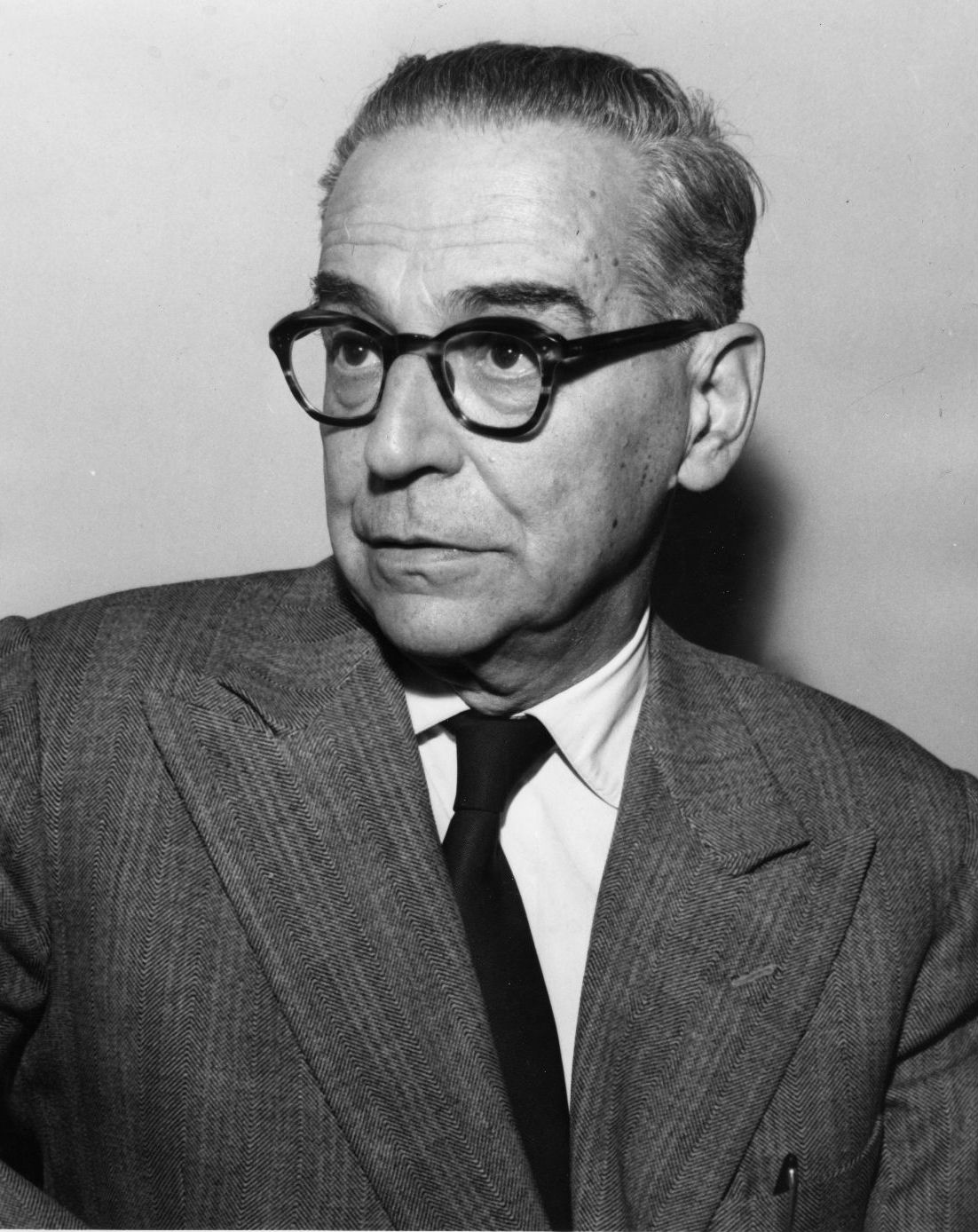
- "for the epic force with which he has traced themes and depicted human destinies drawn from the history of his country."
- Date: 26 October 1961 (announcement); 10 December 1961 (ceremony)
- Location: Stockholm, Sweden
- Presented by: Swedish Academy
- Hosted by: Anders Österling
- First award: 1901
- Website: Official website

The 1961 Nobel Prize in Literature was awarded to the Yugoslav (Note: Above all, he is renowned for his contributions to Yugoslav literature. When he was young, he wrote in his native Ijekavian dialect, but switched to the Ekavian dialect while living in the Yugoslav capital. The Nobel Committee lists him as a Yugoslav and identifies the language he used as Serbo-Croatian.) writer Ivo Andrić (1892–1975) "for the epic force with which he has traced themes and depicted human destinies drawn from the history of his country." He is the first and only Serbian recipient of the literature prize.

== Laureate ==
Ivo Andrić began by writing poetry, and philosophers like Kierkegaard, Nietzsche, Kafka and Goethe had an impact on his philosophical views. But his preferred literary form would be the historical epic. The fates of people are illuminated against a historical, cultural, and religious backdrop in Andrić's writings, such as his monumental novel Na Drini ćuprija ("The Bridge on the Drina", 1945). His stories show both immense love for individuals and brutality and violence. His writing is clear and full of information, and his stories are filled with insightful psychological observations. His other well-known literary oeuvres include Travnička hronika ("Travnika Chronicle", 1945) and Prokleta avlija ("The Damned Yard", 1954).

== Deliberations ==
=== Nominations ===
Andrić earned ten nominations on four occasions. He was first nominated in 1958 by The Yugoslavian Author's Society. On 1961, he was recommended by four nominators from Elizabeth Hill, Lennart Breitholtz, Johannes Edfelt and the aforementioned society which led to his awarding.

In total, the Swedish Academy's Nobel Committee received 93 nominations for 56 authors such as Sarvepalli Radhakrishnan, John Steinbeck (awarded in 1962), André Malraux, Graham Greene, Georges Simenon, Ramón Menéndez Pidal, Robert Frost and Rómulo Gallegos. Fifteen of the nominees were nominated for the first time, among them Yasunari Kawabata (awarded in 1968), Gaston Bachelard, Cora Sandel, Jean Anouilh, Simone de Beauvoir, J. R. R. Tolkien, Lawrence Durrell, W. H. Auden and Friedrich Dürrenmatt. There were five female nominees namely Giulia Scappino Murena, Gertrud von le Fort, Karen Blixen, Cora Sandel and Simone de Beauvoir.

The authors Jacques Stephen Alexis, Lucian Blaga, Joanna Cannan, Louis-Ferdinand Céline, Mazo de la Roche, Louis de Wohl, Hilda Doolittle, Frantz Fanon, Olga Forsh, Leonhard Frank, Simon Gantillon, Dashiell Hammett, Émile Henriot, George S. Kaufman, Maurice Merleau-Ponty, Oliver Onions, Jessie Redmon Fauset, Mihail Sadoveanu, Peyami Safa, Frédéric-Louis Sauser (known as Blaise Cendrars), Clark Ashton Smith, Antanas Škėma, Dorothy Thompson and Maria Valtorta died in 1961 without having been nominated for the prize.

Official list of nominees and their nominators for the prize
No.	Nominee	Country	Genre(s)	Nominator(s)
1	Ivo Andrić (1892–1975)	Yugoslavia; Serbia	novel, short story, poetry	Elizabeth Hill (1900–1996); Lennart Breitholtz (1909–1998); Johannes Edfelt (1904–1997); Association of Writers of Yugoslavia
2	Jean Anouilh (1910–1987)	France	drama, screenplay, translation	Harold Lawton (1899–2005); Francis James Carmody (1907–1982)
3	Wystan Hugh Auden (1907–1973)	United Kingdom; United States	poetry, essays, screenplay	Ernest Ludwig Stahl (1902–1992)
4	Gaston Bachelard (1884–1962)	France	philosophy	Georges May (1920–2003)
5	Karen Blixen (1885–1962)	Denmark	novel, short story, memoir	Rolf Westman (1927–2017); Friedrich von der Leyen (1873–1966)
6	Maurice Bowra (1898–1971)	United Kingdom	history, essays, literary criticism, poetry	M. A. Oxon (–)
7	Heinrich Böll (1917–1985)	West Germany	novel, short story	Walter Höllerer (1922–2003); Fritz Martini (1909–1991); Hermann Weigand (1892–1985); Gustav Korlén (1915–2014)
8	Simone de Beauvoir (1908–1986)	France	novel, drama, memoir, philosophy, essays, short story	Henri Peyre (1901–1988)
9	Michel de Ghelderode (1898–1962)	Belgium	drama, short story, essays	Eric Bentley (1916–2020)
10	Georges Duhamel (1884–1966)	France	novel, short story, poetry, drama, literary criticism	Frederick Charles Green (1891–1964)
11	Lawrence Durrell (1912–1990)	United Kingdom	novel, short story, poetry, drama, essays	Hjalmar Gullberg (1898–1961)
12	Friedrich Dürrenmatt (1921–1990)	Switzerland	drama, novel, short story, essays	Joachim Müller (1906–1986); Friedrich Sengle (1909–1994)
13	Johan Falkberget (1879–1967)	Norway	novel, short story, essays	Johannes Andreasson Dale (1898–1975)
14	Edward Morgan Forster (1879–1970)	United Kingdom	novel, short story, drama, essays, biography, literary criticism	Simeon Potter (1898–1976); William David Williams (1900–1985); Walter Horace Bruford (1894–1988)
15	Robert Frost (1874–1963)	United States	poetry, drama	Several professors; Wystan Hugh Auden (1907–1973); Carlos Baker (1909–1987); Moses Hadas (1900–1966); Donald M. Frame (1911–1991); Frederick Wilcox Dupee (1904–1979); Andrew Chiappe (1915–1967); Pearl S. Buck (1892–1973)
16	Rómulo Gallegos (1884–1969)	Venezuela	novel, short story	Several professors; Rudolf Grossmann (1892–1980); Eugenio Florit (1903–1999); Angel del Rio (1900–1962); Academia Venezolana de la Lengua
17	Armand Godoy (1880–1964)	Cuba; France	poetry, translation	Anna Hyatt Huntington (1876–1973)
18	Julien Gracq (1910–2007)	France	novel, poetry, drama, literary criticism	Eyvind Johnson (1900–1976)
19	Robert Graves (1895–1985)	United Kingdom	history, novel, poetry, literary criticism, essays	Henry Olsson (1896–1985)
20	Graham Greene (1904–1991)	United Kingdom	novel, short story, autobiography, essays	The English PEN-Club; Robert Niklaus (1910–2001); Kristian Smidt (1916–2013); Gabriel Turville-Petre (1908–1978)
21	Gunnar Gunnarsson (1889–1975)	Iceland	novel, short story, poetry	Stellan Arvidson (1902–1997)
22	Leslie Poles Hartley (1895–1972)	United Kingdom	novel, short story	August Closs (1898–1990); Geoffrey Tillotson (1905–1969)
23	Adriaan Roland Holst (1888–1976)	Netherlands	poetry	Jan de Vries (1890–1964); Jan Kamerbeek Jr. (1905–1977)
24	Taha Hussein (1889–1973)	Egypt	novel, short story, poetry, translation	Muhammad A. Khalafallah (1916–1997); Olle Hedberg (1899–1974); Henrik Samuel Nyberg (1889–1974)
25	Aldous Huxley (1894–1963)	United Kingdom	novel, short story, essays, poetry, screenplay, drama, philosophy	Jacques Barzun (1907–2012)
26	Pierre Jean Jouve (1887–1976)	France	poetry, novel, literary criticism	Francis James Carmody (1907–1982)
27	Ernst Jünger (1895–1998)	West Germany	philosophy, novel, memoir	August Closs (1898–1990)
28	Yasunari Kawabata (1899–1972)	Japan	novel, short story	Henry Olsson (1896–1985)
29	Miroslav Krleža (1893–1981)	Yugoslavia	poetry, drama, short story, novel, essays	Association of Writers of Yugoslavia
30	André Malraux (1901–1976)	France	novel, essays, literary criticism	Claude Digeon (1920–2008)
31	William Somerset Maugham (1874–1965)	United Kingdom	novel, short story, drama, essays	Karel van het Reve (1921–1999)
32	Ramón Menéndez Pidal (1869–1968)	Spain	philology, history	Walter Pabst (1907–1992); Jaap van Praag (1911–1981); Gunnar Tilander (1894–1973)
33	Eugenio Montale (1896–1981)	Italy	poetry, translation	Michele De Filippis (1891–1975)
34	Alberto Moravia (1907–1990)	Italy	novel, literary criticism, essays, drama	Anders Wedberg (1913–1978)
35	Pablo Neruda (1904–1973)	Chile	poetry	Francis James Carmody (1907–1982)
36	Junzaburō Nishiwaki (1894–1982)	Japan	poetry, literary criticism	The Japanese Authors' Union
37	Seán O'Casey (1880–1964)	Ireland	drama, memoir	Roy Pascal (1904–1980); Geoffrey Tillotson (1905–1969)
38	Sarvepalli Radhakrishnan (1888–1975)	India	philosophy, essays, law	Nirmal Kumar Sidhanta (1929–2014)
39	Cora Sandel (1880–1974)	Norway	novel, short story	Harald Ofstad (1920–1994)
40	Aksel Sandemose (1899–1965)	Denmark; Norway	novel, essays	Eyvind Johnson (1900–1976)
41	Jean-Paul Sartre (1905–1980)	France	philosophy, novel, drama, essays, screenplay	Jacqueline de La Harpe (1894–1980); Kristian Smidt (1916–2013)
42	Giulia Scappino Murena (1902–1967)	Italy	poetry	Alfredo Galletti (1872–1962)
43	Giorgos Seferis (1900–1971)	Greece	poetry, memoir, essays	Thomas Stearns Eliot (1888–1965)
44	Mikhail Sholokhov (1905–1984)	Soviet Union	novel	Harry Martinson (1904–1978)
45	Ignazio Silone (1900–1978)	Italy	novel, short story, essays, drama	Elias Wessén (1889–1981)
46	Georges Simenon (1903–1989)	Belgium	novel, short story, memoir	Cornelis Soeteman (1912–2005); Justin O'Brien (1906–1968)
47	Charles Percy Snow (1905–1980)	United Kingdom	novel, essays	Friedrich Schubel (1904–1991); Robert Ralston Crawley (1893–1973); Norman Jeffares (1920–2005)
48	John Steinbeck (1902–1968)	United States	novel, short story, screenplay	Eugène Vinaver (1899–1979); The Danish PEN-Club
49	Jun'ichirō Tanizaki (1886–1965)	Japan	novel, short story	The Japanese Authors' Union
50	John Ronald Reuel Tolkien (1892–1973)	United Kingdom	novel, short story, poetry, philology, essays, literary criticism	Clive Staples Lewis (1898–1963)
51	Miguel Torga (1907–1995)	Portugal	poetry, short story, novel, drama, autobiography	Hernâni Antonio Cidade (1887–1975)
52	Tarjei Vesaas (1897–1970)	Norway	poetry, novel	Sigmund Skard (1903–1995); Johannes Andreasson Dale (1898–1975)
53	Simon Vestdijk (1898–1971)	Netherlands	novel, poetry, essays, translation	Jan Kamerbeek Jr. (1905–1977)
54	Gertrud von Le Fort (1876–1971)	West Germany	novel, short story, essays, poetry	Friedrich von der Leyen (1873–1966)
55	Arthur David Waley (1889–1966)	United Kingdom	translation, essays	Edwin G. Pulleyblank (1922–2013)
56	Edmund Wilson (1895–1972)	United States	essays, literary criticism, short story, drama	Serge Konovalov (1899–1982)

== Prize decision ==
For the 1961 Nobel Prize in Literature, the Nobel committee of the Swedish Academy proposed Ivo Andrić, Graham Greene and the Danish author Karen Blixen, with Andrić receiving the majority of the votes. Committee chairman Anders Österling had the previous year pushed for a prize to Andrić, noting the Yugoslav author's "mastered style" that would open "a previously unknown page in the world chronicle and appeals to us from the depths of the tormented national soul", adding that a prize to Andrić would also have the advantage of correcting "the justified criticism of the geographical distribution of the Nobel Prize in Literature.” Österling stated in the protocol that Graham Greene "appears as a fully worthy candidate", but neither Greene nor Blixen, who was also an annual contender at the time, was awarded the prize.

Other contenders for the 1961 prize included the American poet Robert Frost and novelist E. M. Forster, who were both passed over by the Nobel committee because of their advanced age. Anders Österling said that Frost's age, 86, was "a fundamental obstacle, which the committee regretfully found it necessary to state". Other contenders such as Lawrence Durrell and the Italian novelist Alberto Moravia were ruled out for literary reasons, as were J.R.R. Tolkien whose prose Österling found "has not in any way measured up to storytelling of the highest quality".

== Award ceremony speech ==
At the award ceremony in Stockholm on 10 December 1961, Anders Österling, permanent secretary of the Swedish Academy, said:

Generally speaking, Andric combines modern psychological insight with the fatalism of the Arabian Nights. He feels a great tenderness for mankind, but he does not shrink from horror and violence, the most visible proof to him of the real presence of evil in the world. As a writer he possesses a whole network of original themes that belong only to him; he opens the chronicle of the world, so to speak, at an unknown page, and from the depth of the suffering souls of the Balkan slaves he appeals to our sensibility.(...) The study of history and philosophy has inevitably led him to ask what forces, in the blows and bitterness of antagonisms and conflicts, act to fashion a people and a nation. His own spiritual attitude is crucial in that respect. Considering these antagonisms with a deliberate and acquired serenity, he endeavours to see them all in the light of reason and with a profoundly human spirit. Herein lies, in the last analysis, the major theme of all his work; from the Balkans it brings to the entire world a stoic message, as our generation has experienced it.

== Prize money ==
Andric donated the entire amount of the prize money, 250 232 Swedish crowns, to a fund for building a library in Bosnia-Herzegovina.
