= 1958 Nobel Prize in Literature =

- Boris Pasternak
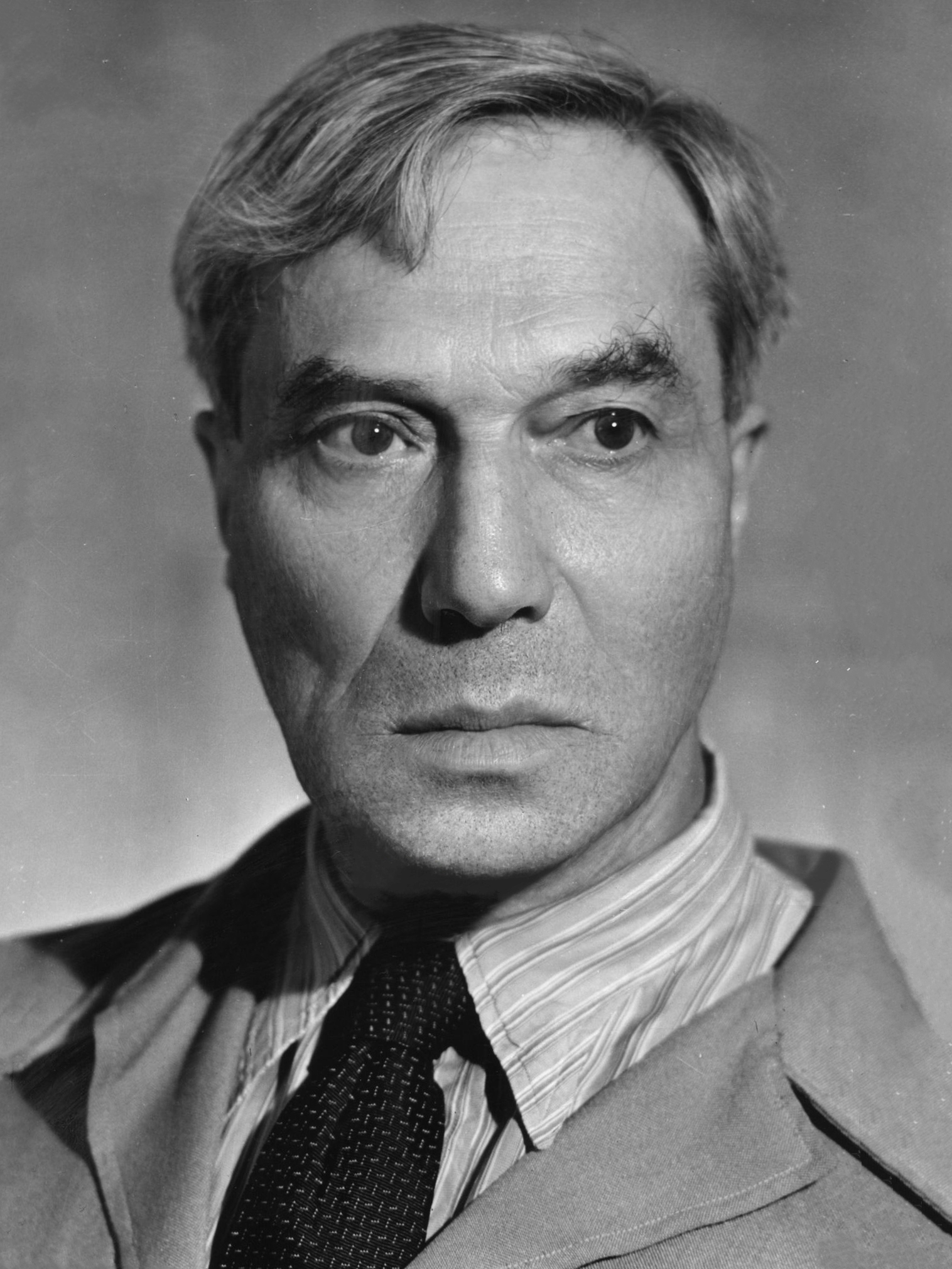
- "for his important achievement both in contemporary lyrical poetry and in the field of the great Russian epic tradition."
- Date: 23 October 1958 (announcement); 10 December 1958 (ceremony)
- Location: Stockholm
- Country: Sweden
- Presented by: Swedish Academy
- First award: 1901
- Website: Official website

The 1958 Nobel Prize in Literature was awarded the Soviet-Russian author Boris Pasternak (1890–1960) "for his important achievement both in contemporary lyrical poetry and in the field of the great Russian epic tradition." He is the second Russian-language writer to be awarded with such honor.

Pasternak first accepted the prize honour, but was then pressured by the Soviet Union authorities to decline the prize. In 1988, Pasternak's son accepted the prize on his behalf.

== Laureate ==
Boris Pasternak's modernist-leaning poetry first came to light in the 1910s and 1920s, when he published collections of poems such as Sestra moya—zhizn ("My Sister, Life", 1922) and Vtoroe rozhdenie ("A Second Birth", 1932). He began to emphasize social issues more and use clearer, simpler language in the 1930s. The existential is another theme in Pasternak's writings, covering nature, life, humanity, and love. The renowned 1957 novel Doctor Zhivago, which takes place between the socialist revolution of 1905 and World War II, demonstrates this.

== Deliberations ==
=== Nominations ===
Pasternak earned 9 nominations in total. He was first introduced for the Nobel Prize in 1946 by English literary critic Maurice Bowra. In 1958, after receiving three recommendations from Renato Poggioli, Harry Levin and Ernest Simmons, he was eventually awarded thereafter.

In total, the Nobel Committee for Literature received 70 nominations for 42 authors such as Riccardo Bacchelli, Robert Frost, Graham Greene, André Malraux, Ramón Menéndez Pidal, Alberto Moravia, Jean-Paul Sartre (awarded in 1964), Ignazio Silone, John Steinbeck (awarded in 1962), Giuseppe Ungaretti and Thornton Wilder. Seventeen of the nominees were newly nominated namely Ivo Andrić (awarded in 1961), Fernand Baldensperger, Elizabeth Bowen, Maurice Bowra, James Gould Cozzens, John Hersey, Miroslav Krleža, Junzaburō Nishiwaki, John Cowper Powys, Salvatore Quasimodo (awarded in 1959), Rudolf Alexander Schröder, Georges Simenon, Jun'ichirō Tanizaki, Lionel Trilling, Elio Vittorini, Robert Penn Warren and Tennessee Williams. There were only five women authors nominated: Karen Blixen, Edith Sitwell, Elizabeth Bowen, Gertrud von le Fort and Marie Under.

The authors Eleanor Hallowell Abbott, Zoe Akins, Mary Ritter Beard, Yahya Kemal Beyatlı, Til Brugman, James Branch Cabell, Rachel Crothers, Anurupa Debi, Lionel Giles, Feodor Gladkov, Michael Joseph, Henry Kuttner, Cyril M. Kornbluth, Irene Lisboa, Dorothy Macardle, Rose Macaulay, George Edward Moore, George Jean Nathan, Seumas O'Sullivan, Elliot Paul, Máiréad "Peig" Sayers, Robert W. Service, John Collings Squire, Marie Stopes, Ralph Waldo Trine, Ethel Turner, Alfred Weber, and Geoffrey Willans died in 1958 without having been nominated for the award. The French literary scholar Fernand Baldensperger died before the only chance to be rewarded.

Official list of nominees and their nominators for the prize
No.	Nominee	Country	Genre(s)	Nominator(s)
1	Ivo Andrić (1892–1975)	Yugoslavia	novel, short story, poetry	Association of Writers of Yugoslavia
2	Riccardo Bacchelli (1891–1985)	Italy	novel, drama, essays	Hans Nilsson-Ehle (1910–1983)
3	Fernand Baldensperger (1871–1958)	France	essays, literary criticism, poetry	Alan Carey Taylor (1905–1975)
4	Karen Blixen (1885–1962)	Denmark	novel, short story, memoir	Elias Wessén (1889–1981)
5	Elizabeth Bowen (1899–1973)	Ireland; United Kingdom	novel, short story, essays	Roman Jakobson (1896–1982)
6	Maurice Bowra (1898–1971)	United Kingdom	history, essays, literary criticism, poetry	Ernest Ludwig Stahl (1902–1992)
7	Martin Buber (1878–1965)	Austria; Israel	philosophy	Hermann Hesse (1877–1962)
8	James Gould Cozzens (1903–1978)	United States	novel	Gordon S. Haight (1901–1985)
9	Gonzague de Reynold (1880–1970)	Switzerland	history, essays, biography, memoir	Pierre-Henri Simon (1903–1972)
10	Robert Frost (1874–1963)	United States	poetry, drama	W. Cabell Greet (1901–1972); Howard Mumford Jones (1892–1980); Alfred Harbage (1901–1976); Douglas Bush (1896–1983); Leon Edel (1907–1997)
11	Graham Greene (1904–1991)	United Kingdom	novel, short story, autobiography, essays	Kristian Smidt (1916–2013)
12	John Hersey (1914–1993)	United States	novel, short story, essays	Helen Rose Hull (1888–1971)
13	Miroslav Krleža (1893–1981)	Yugoslavia	poetry, drama, short story, novel, essays	Association of Writers of Yugoslavia
14	André Malraux (1901–1976)	France	novel, essays, literary criticism	Louis L. Martz (1913–2001); Jean Hytier (1899–1983); Wilbur Merrill Frohock (1908–1984)
15	Ramón Menéndez Pidal (1869–1968)	Spain	philology, history	Alexander A. Parker (1908–1989); Edward Meryon Wilson (1906–1977); Gunnar Tilander (1894–1973); Several professors
16	Alberto Moravia (1907–1990)	Italy	novel, literary criticism, essays, drama	Stuart Pratt Atkins (1914–2000); Hans Nilsson-Ehle (1910–1983)
17	Junzaburō Nishiwaki (1894–1982)	Japan	poetry, literary criticism	Naoshirō Tsuji (1899–1979)
18	Boris Pasternak (1890–1960)	Soviet Union	poetry, novel, translation	Ernest Simmons (1903–1972); Harry Levin (1912–1994); Renato Poggioli (1907–1963)
19	Saint-John Perse (1887–1975)	France	poetry	Thomas Stearns Eliot (1888–1965); Henri Peyre (1901–1988); Archibald MacLeish (1892–1982); American Academy of Arts and Letters
20	John Cowper Powys (1872–1963)	United Kingdom	philosophy, novel, literary criticism, poetry, essays, short story	Enid Starkie (1897–1970)
21	Salvatore Quasimodo (1901–1968)	Italy	poetry, translation	Maurice Bowra (1898–1971); Carlo Bo (1911–2001); Francesco Flora (1891–1962)
22	Sarvepalli Radhakrishnan (1888–1975)	India	philosophy, essays, law	Nirmal Kumar Sidhanta (1929–2014)
23	Alfonso Reyes Ochoa (1889–1959)	Mexico	philosophy, essays, novel, poetry	Angel del Río (1901–1962)
24	Carl Sandburg (1878–1967)	United States	poetry, essays, biography	Henning Larsen (1889–1971)
25	Jean-Paul Sartre (1905–1980)	France	philosophy, novel, drama, essays, screenplay	Kristian Smidt (1916–2013)
26	Rudolf Alexander Schröder (1878–1962)	West Germany	poetry, songwriting, translation	Thomas Stearns Eliot (1888–1965); Robert Minder (1902–1980); Friedrich Märker (1893–1985); Bavarian Academy of Fine Arts
27	Mikhail Sholokhov (1905–1984)	Soviet Union	novel	Johannes Andreasson Dale (1898–1975); Johannes Edfelt (1904–1997); Harry Martinson (1904–1978)
28	Ignazio Silone (1900–1978)	Italy	novel, short story, essays, drama	Dag Hammarskjöld (1905–1961); Henry Olsson (1896–1985)
29	Georges Simenon (1903–1989)	Belgium	novel, short story, memoir	Justin O'Brien (1906–1968); Fernand Desonay (1899–1973); Belgian Association of Writers
30	Edith Sitwell (1887–1964)	United Kingdom	poetry, essays, memoir	Walter MacKellar (1927–2016)
31	John Steinbeck (1902–1968)	United States	novel, short story, screenplay	Lennox Grey (1939–2013)
32	Jun'ichirō Tanizaki (1886–1965)	Japan	novel, short story	Pearl S. Buck (1892–1973)
33	Lionel Trilling (1905–1975)	United States	essays, literary criticism, short story	Charles Warren Everett (1895–1983)
34	Marie Under (1883–1980)	Estonia	poetry	William Kleesmann Matthews (1901–1958)
35	Giuseppe Ungaretti (1888–1970)	Italy	poetry, essays, literary criticism	Howard R. Marraro (1897–1972)
36	Tarjei Vesaas (1897–1970)	Norway	poetry, novel	Harald Beyer (1891–1960)
37	Simon Vestdijk (1898–1971)	Netherlands	novel, poetry, essays, translation	Benjamin Hunningher (1903–1991)
38	Elio Vittorini (1908–1966)	Italy	novel, short story	Stuart Pratt Atkins (1914–2000)
39	Gertrud von Le Fort (1876–1971)	West Germany	novel, short story, essays, poetry	Hermann Kunisch (1901–1991); Bavarian Academy of Fine Arts
40	Robert Penn Warren (1905–1989)	United States	novel, poetry, essays, literary criticism	René Wellek (1903–1995)
41	Thornton Wilder (1897–1975)	United States	drama, novel, short story	Jean Boorsch (1906–2008); Heinz Bluhm (1907–1993); Frederick Albert Pottle (1897–1987); Henry D. Hatfield (1875–1962)
42	Tennessee Williams (1911–1983)	United States	drama, novel, screenplay, short story, poetry	Napier Wilt (1896–1975)

== Prize decision ==
The main contenders for the prize in 1958 were the Danish author Karen Blixen, Italian novelist Alberto Moravia and Boris Pasternak. Pasternak's recently published novel Doctor Zhivago was decisive for the Nobel committee to unanimously propose Pasternak for the prize he was eventually awarded. The Nobel prize archives shows that no political aspects regarding Pasternak's candidacy were taken in consideration by the Nobel committee during the deliberations and that he was awarded purely on literary merits. According to The New York Times, the members of the Swedish Academy voted unanimously to award Pasternak.

== Reactions ==
The choice of Pasternak was heavily criticized by the communist Soviet Union authorities who pressured Pasternak to declined the prize. The prize decision and the Soviet reactions provoked a massive worldwide geopolitical debate,

The Swedish primer minister Tage Erlander condemned the Soviet reactions, but also criticized the Swedish Academy for their "wholly (or at least predominantly) political" reasons to award Pasternak.
