= 1962 Nobel Prize in Literature =

- John Steinbeck
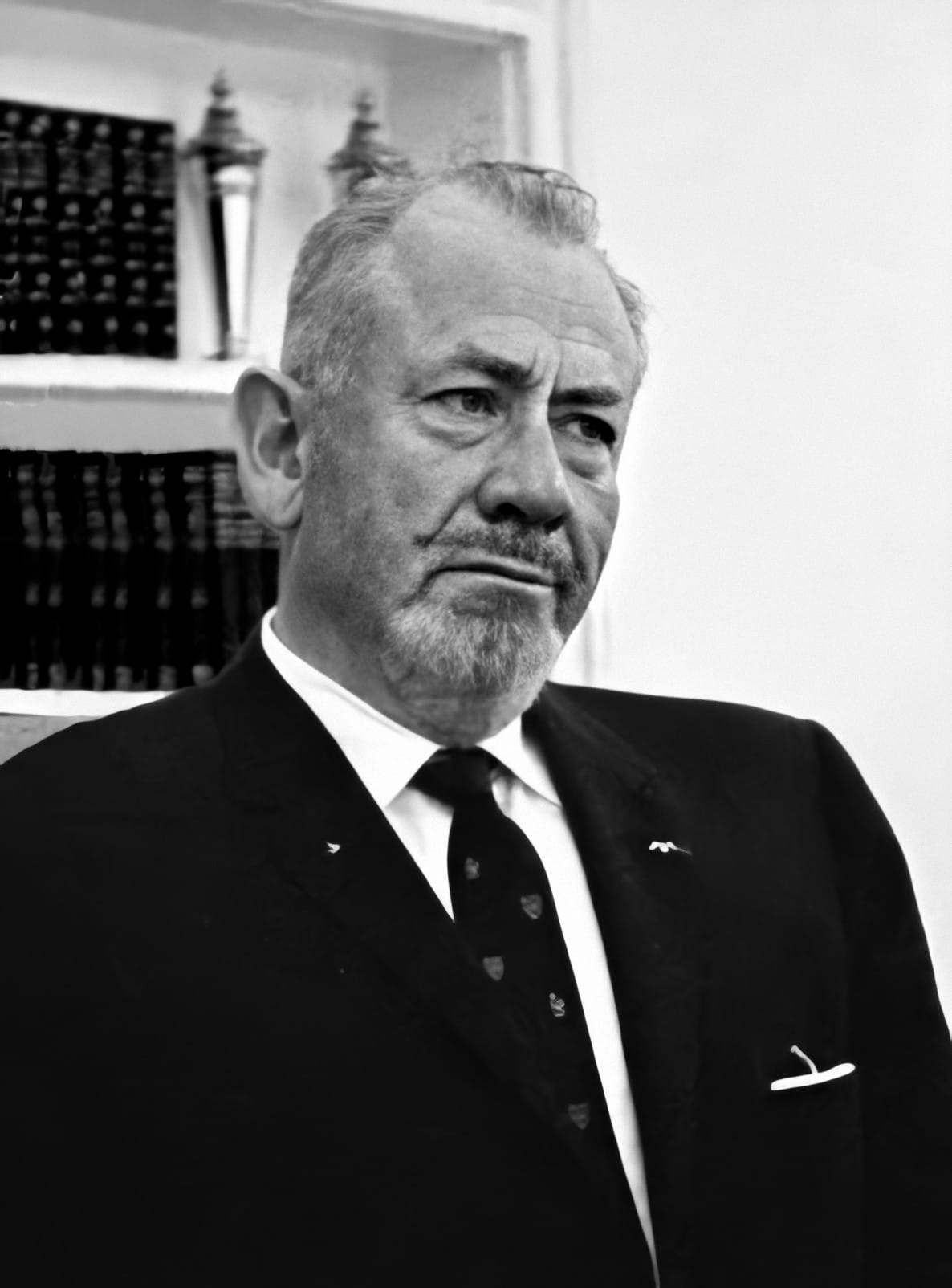
- "for his realistic and imaginative writings, combining as they do sympathetic humour and keen social perception."
- Date: 25 October 1962 (announcement); 10 December 1962 (ceremony)
- Location: Stockholm, Sweden
- Presented by: Swedish Academy
- First award: 1901
- Website: Official website

The 1962 Nobel Prize in Literature was awarded to the American author John Steinbeck (1902–1968) "for his realistic and imaginative writings, combining as they do sympathetic humour and keen social perception."

== Laureate ==
Social conditions of migrants and seasonal workers became a recurring theme in Steinbeck's writings and were particularly evident in Of Mice and Men (1937) and The Grapes of Wrath (1939). The latter relates how unemployment and abuse of power forced farmers to migrate from Oklahoma to California. Sympathy with the downtrodden and the poor characterizes his writing. It is expressed with a compassionate sense of humor and a sharp eye for social and economic injustices. His other outstanding works include East of Eden (1952), Tortilla Flat (1935) and The Pearl (1947).

== Deliberations ==
=== Nominations ===
Steinbeck was nominated for the Nobel Prize in Literature on 11 occasions, the first time in 1943. In 1962, the Nobel committee received two nominations for him. Included in the shortlisted nominees were Steinbeck, Robert Graves, Lawrence Durrell, Jean Anouilh, and Karen Blixen. Steinbeck was awarded eventually, but the four never received the prize.

In total, the Swedish Academy received 86 nominations for 66 writers. Fifteen of the nominees were nominated first-time among them William Heinesen, Pietro Ubaldi, Ronald Syme, Carl Zuckmayer, André Schwarz-Bart, Josep Carner and Eyvind Johnson (awarded in 1974). British novelist E. M. Forster earned the highest number of nominations (4 nominations) followed by Jean-Paul Sartre and Friedrich Dürrenmatt (3 nominations each). Three of the nominees were women namely Karen Blixen, Gertrud von le Fort and Giulia Scappino Murena.

The authors Antonio Acevedo Hernández, Gerrit Achterberg, Richard Aldington, Jean Amrouche, Georges Bataille, Pierre Benoit, E. E. Cummings, Maria Dermoût, Jean Devanny, Mouloud Feraoun, Wilfrid Wilson Gibson, Mary Gilmore, Patrick Hamilton, Pierre Hamp, Agnes Henningsen, Robinson Jeffers, Helge Krog, Alda Lara, María Rosa Lida de Malkiel, Arthur Oncken Lovejoy, Francisco Méndez, Patrícia Rehder Galvão (known as Pagu), Vita Sackville-West, Hajime Tanabe, Ahmet Hamdi Tanpınar, Sandu Tudor, Mohammad Yamin, and Ouyang Yuqian died in 1962 without having been nominated for the prize. Danish author Karen Blixen and German translator Rudolf Alexander Schröder died weeks before the announcement.

Official list of nominees and their nominators for the prize
No.	Nominee	Country	Genre(s)	Nominator(s)
1	Jean Anouilh (1910–1987)	France	drama, screenplay, translation	Harry Martinson (1904–1978)
2	Karen Blixen (1885–1962)	Denmark	novel, short story, memoir	Henry Olsson (1896–1985)
3	Heinrich Böll (1917–1985)	West Germany	novel, short story	Duncan Mennie (1909–1998); Gustav Korlén (1915–2014)
4	Jorge Luis Borges (1899–1986)	Argentina	poetry, essays, translation, short story	Henry Olsson (1896–1985)
5	Martin Buber (1878–1965)	Austria; Israel	philosophy	Michael Landmann (1913–1984); Elias Wessén (1889–1981)
6	Josep Carner (1884–1970)	Spain	poetry, drama, translation	Jean Camp (1891–1968)
7	Franz Theodor Csokor (1885–1969)	Austria	drama, essays, poetry, autobiography	The Austrian PEN-Club
8	Lawrence Durrell (1912–1990)	United Kingdom	novel, short story, poetry, drama, essays	Wolfgang Iser (1926–2007); Erich Burck (1901–1994)
9	Friedrich Dürrenmatt (1921–1990)	Switzerland	drama, novel, short story, essays	Friedrich Sengle (1909–1994); Jean-Pierre Schmid (1920–1977); Bjarne Ulvestad (1922–2004)
10	Johan Falkberget (1879–1967)	Norway	novel, short story, essays	Johannes Andreasson Dale (1898–1975)
11	Edward Morgan Forster (1879–1970)	United Kingdom	novel, short story, drama, essays, biography, literary criticism	Kurt Wais (1907–1995); Simeon Potter (1898–1976); The English PEN-Club; Kenneth Muir (1907–1996)
12	Max Frisch (1911–1991)	Switzerland	novel, drama	Hildebrecht Hommel (1899–1986); Johannes Holthusen (1924–1985)
13	Robert Frost (1874–1963)	United States	poetry, drama	Clive Staples Lewis (1898–1963)
14	Rómulo Gallegos (1884–1969)	Venezuela	novel, short story	Rudolf Grossmann (1892–1980)
15	Robert Graves (1895–1985)	United Kingdom	history, novel, poetry, literary criticism, essays	Harry Martinson (1904–1978)
16	Graham Greene (1904–1991)	United Kingdom	novel, short story, autobiography, essays	Robert Niklaus (1910–2001); Frede Løkkegaard (1915–1990)
17	Jorge Guillén (1893–1984)	Spain	poetry, literary criticism	Georges Poulet (1902–1991)
18	Leslie Poles Hartley (1895–1972)	United Kingdom	novel, short story	Geoffrey Tillotson (1905–1969)
19	Manfred Hausmann (1898–1986)	West Germany	novel, short story, poetry, essays	Heinrich Dörrie (1911–1983)
20	William Heinesen (1900–1991)	Faroe Islands	poetry, short story, novel	Christian Matras (1900–1988)
21	Taha Hussein (1889–1973)	Egypt	novel, short story, poetry, translation	Olle Hedberg (1899–1974); Henrik Samuel Nyberg (1889–1974)
22	Roman Jakobson (1896–1982)	Russia; United States	essays	Peter Hartmann (1923–1984)
23	Eyvind Johnson (1900–1976)	Sweden	novel, short story	Carl-Eric Thors (1920–1986)
24	Erich Kästner (1899–1974)	West Germany	poetry, screenplay, autobiography	Friedrich Sengle (1909–1994); Henry Olsson (1896–1985)
25	Yasunari Kawabata (1899–1972)	Japan	novel, short story	The Japanese PEN-Club
26	Humphrey Davy Findley Kitto (1897–1982)	United Kingdom	history	William Beare (1933–2019)
27	Miroslav Krleža (1893–1981)	Yugoslavia	poetry, drama, short story, novel, essays	The Yugoslavian Writers Association
28	Frank Raymond Leavis (1895–1978)	United Kingdom	literary criticism, essays	Cecil Arthur Hackett (1908–2000)
29	André Malraux (1901–1976)	France	novel, essays, literary criticism	John Martin Cocking (1914–1986); Ingvar Andersson (1899–1974)
30	Gabriel Marcel (1889–1973)	France	philosophy, drama	Leo Gabriel (1902–1987); Harald Weinrich (1927–2022)
31	William Somerset Maugham (1874–1965)	United Kingdom	novel, short story, drama, essays	Richard Broxton Onians (1899–1986)
32	Max Mell (1882–1971)	Austria	drama, novel, screenplay	Moritz Enzinger (1891–1975)
33	Ramón Menéndez Pidal (1869–1968)	Spain	philology, history	Academia Boliviana de la Lengua; Gunnar Tilander (1894–1973)
34	Vilhelm Moberg (1898–1973)	Sweden	novel, drama, history	Gösta Bergman (1894–1984)
35	Alberto Moravia (1907–1990)	Italy	novel, literary criticism, essays, drama	Ingmar Bergman (1918–2007)
36	Stratis Myrivilis (1890–1969)	Greece	novel, short story	Writers Association of the Hellenes
37	Pablo Neruda (1904–1973)	Chile	poetry	The Chilean Authors Society
38	Junzaburō Nishiwaki (1894–1982)	Japan	poetry, literary criticism	Naoshiro Tsuji (1899–1979)
39	Hans Erich Nossack (1901–1977)	West Germany	novel, drama	Josef Matl (1897–1974)
40	Seán O'Casey (1880–1964)	Ireland	drama, memoir	Geoffrey Tillotson (1905–1969)
41	Ezra Pound (1885–1972)	United States	poetry, essays	Karl Ragnar Gierow (1904–1982)
42	John Cowper Powys (1872–1963)	United Kingdom	philosophy, novel, literary criticism, poetry, essays, short story	George Wilson Knight (1897–1985)
43	Sarvepalli Radhakrishnan (1888–1975)	India	philosophy, essays, law	Arthur John Arberry (1905–1969); Nirmal Kumar Sidhanta (1929–2014)
44	Aksel Sandemose (1899–1965)	Denmark; Norway	novel, essays	Eyvind Johnson (1900–1976)
45	Jean-Paul Sartre (1905–1980)	France	philosophy, novel, drama, essays, screenplay	Cecil Arthur Hackett (1908–2000); Stephen Ullmann (1914–1976); Johannes Edfelt (1904–1997)
46	Giulia Scappino Murena (1902–1967)	Italy	poetry	Alfredo Galletti (1872–1962)
47	Rudolf Alexander Schröder (1878–1962)	West Germany	poetry, translation	Ernst Zinn (1910–1990)
48	André Schwarz-Bart (1928–2006)	France	novel	Ingerid Dal (1895–1985)
49	Giorgos Seferis (1900–1971)	Greece	poetry, memoir, essays	Constantine Athanasius Trypanis (1909–1993); Eyvind Johnson (1900–1976)
50	Mikhail Sholokhov (1905–1984)	Soviet Union	novel	Henrik Becker (1902–1984)
51	Ignazio Silone (1900–1978)	Italy	novel, short story, essays, drama	Elias Wessén (1889–1981)
52	John Steinbeck (1902–1968)	United States	novel, short story, screenplay	The Danish PEN-Club; Eyvind Johnson (1900–1976)
53	Ronald Syme (1903–1989)	New Zealand; United Kingdom	history	Albrecht Dihle (1923–2020)
54	Jun'ichirō Tanizaki (1886–1965)	Japan	novel, short story	Howard Hibbett (1920–2019)
55	Frank Thiess (1890–1977)	West Germany	novel	Helmuth Scheel (1895–1967)
56	Miguel Torga (1907–1995)	Portugal	poetry, short story, novel, drama, autobiography	Hernâni Antonio Cidade (1887–1975)
57	Pietro Ubaldi (1886–1972)	Italy	philosophy, essays	Academia Santista de Letras
58	Tarjei Vesaas (1897–1970)	Norway	poetry, novel	Sigmund Skard (1903–1995)
59	Simon Vestdijk (1898–1971)	Netherlands	novel, poetry, essays, translation	The Austrian PEN-Club
60	Heimito von Doderer (1896–1966)	Austria	novel, short story, poetry, essays	Ernst Alker (1895–1972); The Austrian PEN-Club
61	Gertrud von Le Fort (1876–1971)	West Germany	novel, short story, essays, poetry	Friedrich von der Leyen (1873–1966)
62	Arthur David Waley (1889–1966)	United Kingdom	translation, essays	David Hawkes (1923–2009)
63	Thornton Wilder (1897–1975)	United States	drama, novel, short story	Peter Wapnewski (1922–2012)
64	Boris Zaytsev (1881–1972)	Russia	poetry, drama, novel	Rostislav Pletnv (1903–1985)
65	Carl Zuckmayer (1896–1977)	West Germany	drama, screenplay	Rudolf Stark (1912–1966)
66	Arnold Zweig (1887–1968)	East Germany	novel, short story	Henrik Becker (1902–1984)

=== Prize Decision ===
In 2012 (50 years later), the Nobel Prize opened its archives and it was revealed that Steinbeck was a "compromise choice" among a shortlist consisting of Steinbeck, British authors Robert Graves and Lawrence Durrell, French dramatist Jean Anouilh and Danish author Karen Blixen. The declassified documents showed that he was chosen as the best of a not so noteworthy group: "There aren't any obvious candidates for the Nobel prize and the prize committee is in an unenviable situation," wrote committee member Henry Olsson. Blixen died in September making her ineligible for the prize, Durrell's The Alexandria Quartet was not considered enough for a Nobel prize and Anouilh was also passed over, which left Robert Graves and John Steinbeck as the main contenders for the prize. "Between Graves and Steinbeck, I find the choice very difficult – Graves is the older, and at the same time less high profile, while Steinbeck's reputation is of course more popular," wrote committee member Anders Österling. "Since Steinbeck's candidacy nevertheless appears to me to have a larger chance of gathering unqualified support, I consider myself free to give it precedence."

Although the committee believed Steinbeck's best work was behind him by 1962, Österling believed the release of his novel The Winter of Our Discontent showed that "after some signs of slowing down in recent years, [Steinbeck has] regained his position as a social truth-teller [and is an] authentic realist fully equal to his predecessors Sinclair Lewis and Ernest Hemingway."

In 2010, Swedish Academy's archives later revealed that Danish writer Karen Blixen was a favorite candidate since 1959 but was missed out because the committee were concerned about showing favoritism to Scandinavian writers. "The Nobel academy was probably afraid to appear provincial," Johannes Riis, literary director at Gyldendals publishing house told Politiken. "And so a mistake was made, because obviously Karen Blixen ought to have received the Nobel prize. Instead, it was a kind of reverse provincialism."

== Reactions ==
The selection of Steinbeck was heavily criticized, and described as "one of the Academy's biggest mistakes" in one Swedish newspaper. While there were some positive reactions in America, The New York Times asked why the Nobel committee gave the award to an author whose "limited talent is, in his best books, watered down by tenth-rate philosophising", adding, "we think it interesting that the laurel was not awarded to a writer ... whose significance, influence and sheer body of work had already made a more profound impression on the literature of our age". Steinbeck himself, when asked if he deserved the Nobel on the day of the announcement, replied: "Frankly, no." Today, however, many of Steinbecks works are widely read and considered classics of Western literature.

== Award ceremony ==
At the award ceremony in Stockholm on 10 December 1962, Anders Österling, permanent secretary of the Swedish Academy, said:

Among the masters of modern American literature who have already been awarded this Prize – from Sinclair Lewis to Ernest Hemingway – Steinbeck more than holds his own, independent in position and achievement. There is in him a strain of grim humour which, to some extent, redeems his often cruel and crude motif. His sympathies always go out to the oppressed, to the misfits and the distressed; he likes to contrast the simple joy of life with the brutal and cynical craving for money. But in him we find the American temperament also in his great feeling for nature, for the tilled soil, the wasteland, the mountains, and the ocean coasts, all an inexhaustible source of inspiration to Steinbeck in the midst of, and beyond, the world of human beings.
