= Jean Fabre =

Jean Fabre may refer to:

- Jean-Henri Fabre (1823–1915), French entomologist and author
- Jean Fabre (scholar) (1904–1975), French literature scholar
- Jean-Pierre Fabre (born 1952), Togolese politician
- Jean Fabre (rugby union) (born 1935), French rugby union player

== See also ==
- Jan Fabre (born 1958), Belgian multidisciplinary artist, playwright, stage director, choreographer and designer
