= Cora Sandel =

Norwegian artist, writer (1880–1974)

- Sara Cecilia Görvell Fabricius
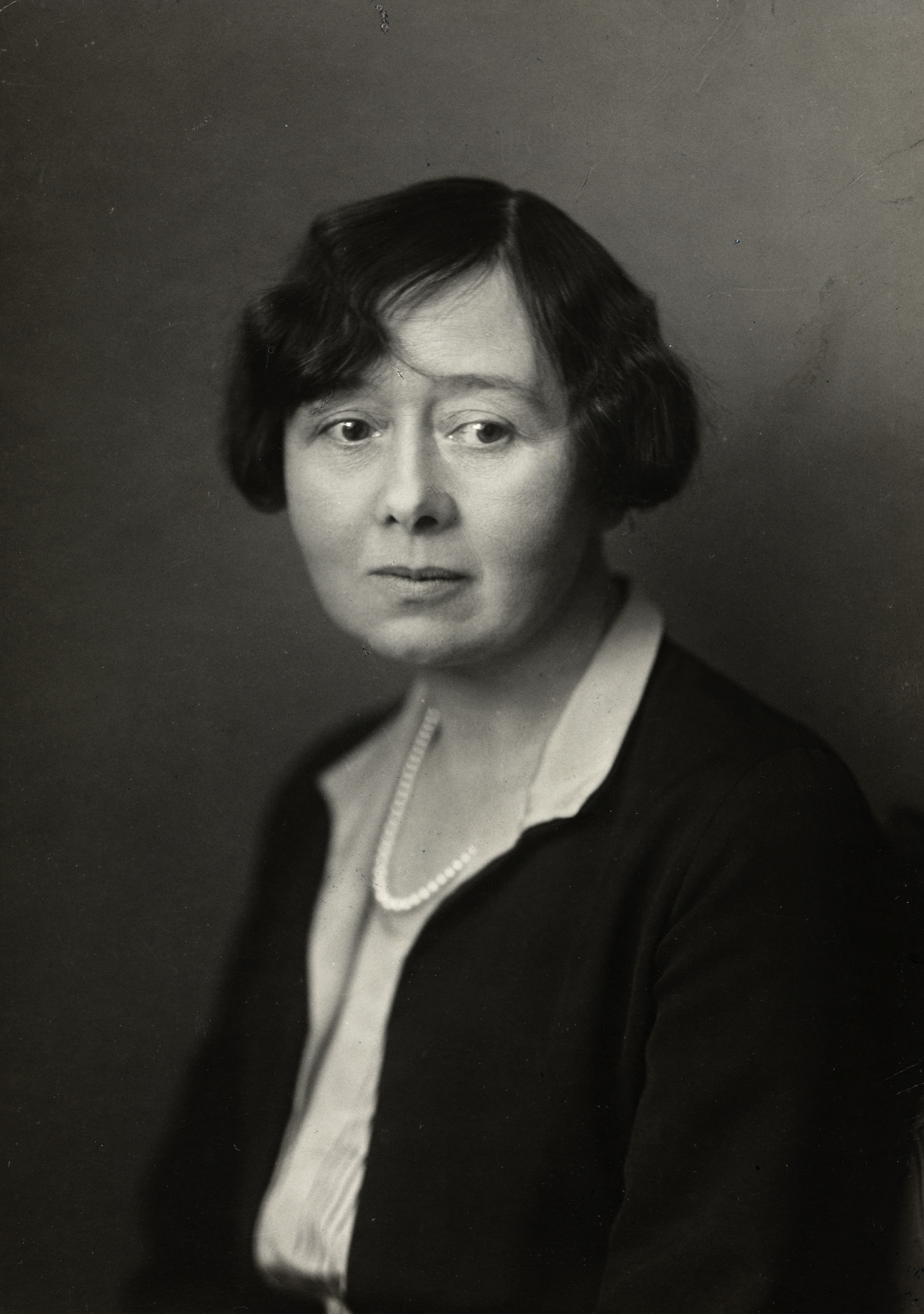
- Born: 20 December 1880; Oslo, Norway
- Died: 3 April 1974 (aged 93); Uppsala, Sweden
- Occupations: novelist and painter
- Partner: Anders Jönsson (m. 1913–1927)
- Writing career
- Language: Norwegian

Sara Cecilia Görvell Fabricius (20 December 1880 – 3 April 1974), better known by her pen name Cora Sandel, was a Norwegian writer and painter who lived most of her adult life abroad. Her best-known works are the novels now known as the Alberta Trilogy. In 1961, she was nominated for the Nobel Prize in Literature by the Norwegian philosopher Harald Ofstad.

== Biography ==
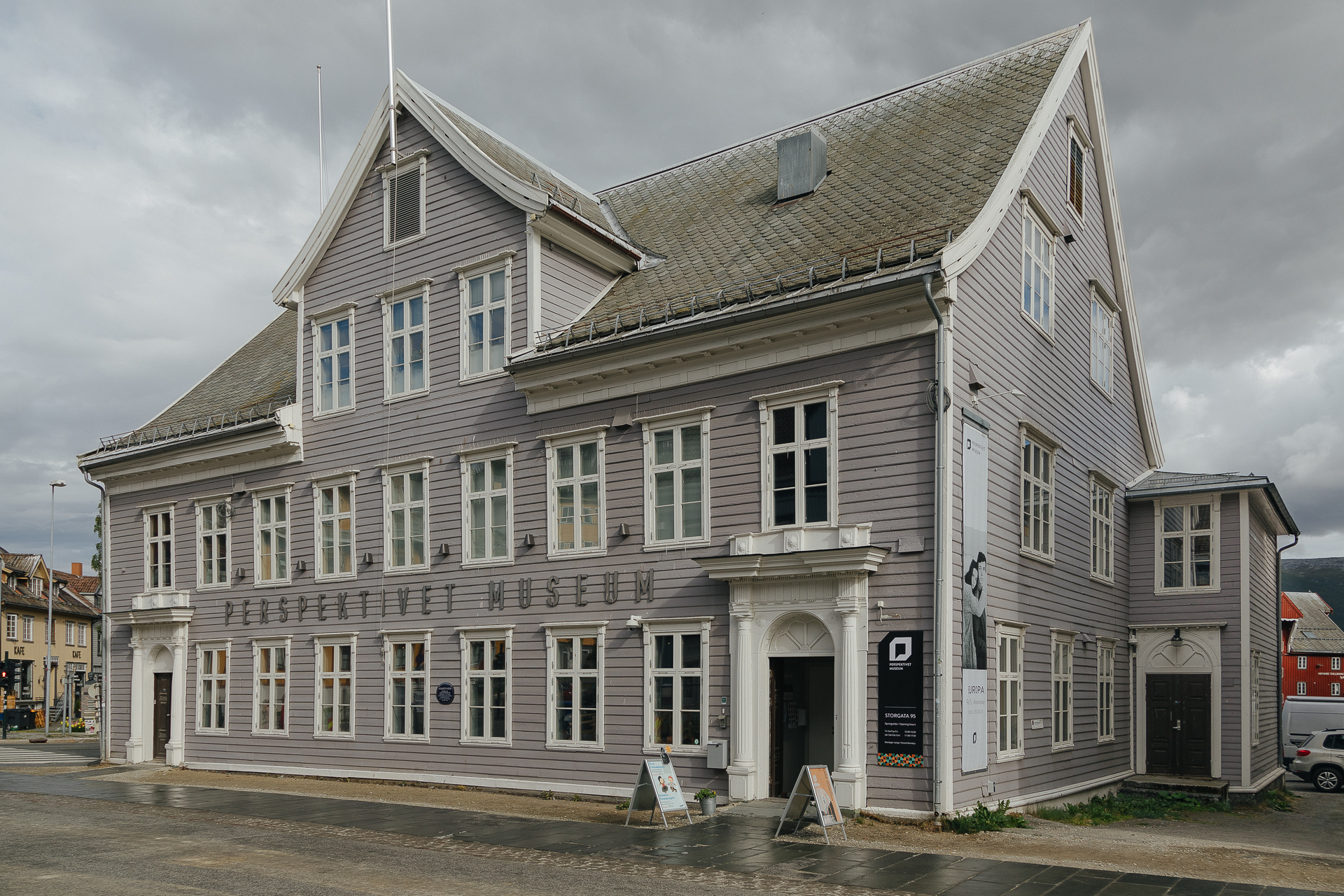
Perspektivet Museum in Tromsø

Sara Cecilia Görvell Fabricius was born in Kristiania (now Oslo), Norway. Her parents were Jens Schow Fabricius (1839–1910) and Anna Margareta Greger (1858–1903). When she was 12 years old, her family moved to Tromsø, where her father was appointed a naval commander. They established their residence at a home rented from the local businessman Johan Henrik Rye Holmboe (1863–1933).

Cora Sandel started painting under the tutelage of Harriet Backer (1845–1932) and at 25 years of age moved to Paris to develop her artistic skills. She lived among the Scandinavian artist colony in Paris from 1906 to 1921. In 1913, she married the Swedish sculptor Anders Jönsson (1883–1965), with whom she had one child. In 1921, the family returned to Sweden, where the couple separated in 1922. Their divorce was finalized in 1926.

During her years in Paris, Sandel helped support the family with short stories and sketches published in Norway. However, her first novel and first tome in the trilogy, Alberte and Jakob, was not published until 1926, when Sandel was 46 years of age. This began the semi-autobiographical Alberta trilogy. Sandel used many elements from her own life and experiences in her stories, which often centre on the spiritual and societal struggles of women marginalized by the strict confines of 19th century society. The Alberta trilogy traced the protagonist's emotional development juxtaposed with the men in her social circle: as a child, her brother Jacob, and lovers and fellow artists as a young woman in Paris. These novels earned her an immediate place in the Scandinavian canon, but it was not until the 1960s that Sandel, then living quietly in Sweden, was discovered by the English-speaking world.

Despite her great literary success, she remained hidden behind her pseudonym and lived a rather secluded life. She lived in Sweden and only visited Norway periodically. She was decorated with the Royal Norwegian Order of St. Olav in 1957. She died in 1970 in Uppsala, Sweden.

Mackgården, her former home in Tromsø, was built in 1838. It now houses the Perspektivet Museum, which was established in 1996 to consolidate the collections of Troms Folkemuseum and Tromsø bymuseum.

== Selected works ==
- Alberte og Jakob, novel ("Alberta and Jacob", 1926, tr. 1962)
- En blå sofa, short story collection ("A Blue Sofa", 1927)
- Alberte og friheten, novel ("Alberta and Freedom", 1931, tr. 1963)
- Carmen og Maja, short story collection ("Carmen and Maja", 1932)
- Mange takk, doktor, short story collection ("Many Thanks, Doctor", 1935)
- Bare Alberte, novel ("Alberta Alone", 1939, tr. 1965)
- Dyr jeg har kjent, short story collection ("Animals I've Known", 1945)
- Kranes konditori, novel ("Krane's Café", 1945–1946, tr. 1968)
- Figurer på mørk bunn, short story collection ("Figures on a dark background", 1949)
- Translation of Colette's La Vagabonde (1952)
- Kjøp ikke Dondi, novel ("Don't Buy Dondi", 1958, tr. 1960 as "The Leech")
- Vårt vanskelige liv, short story collection ("Our Difficult Life", 1960)
- Barnet som elsket veier, short story collection with artwork ("The Child Who Loved Roads", 1973)

== Awards ==
- Gyldendal's Endowment for 1937
