= Gunnar Jakobsen =

Norwegian banker and politician

Gunnar Jakobsen (7 January 1916 – 22 April 1992) was a Norwegian banker and politician for the Liberal Party.

He was born in Tromsø, where he went to secondary school, commerce school and banking school. He was hired by the savings bank Tromsøysundets Sparebank in 1938 and was their CEO from 1960. Multiple banks consolidated into Sparebanken Nord, where Jakobsen was CEO until his retirement. Jakobsen was a leading banker in Troms, being chairman of Storebrand's regional branch, Fellesbanken's local branch and several businesses in the city.

A leading cultural figure in Tromsø, he also chaired the boards of Troms Folkemuseum, the Nordnorsk Musikkonservatorium and the Sandnessund Bridge Authority. He chaired the Troms Liberal Party and was a deputy representative to the Parliament of Norway from Troms during the term 1958 to 1961, albeit without meeting in parliamentary session.
