= Giulia Scappino Murena =

Italian poet

Giulia Scappino Murena (Ferrara 1902 – Bologna 1982) was an Italian poet of religious themes nominated three times for the Nobel Prize.

== Biography ==
Giulia Scappino Murena was born in 1902. She was married to the businessman Domenico Scappino, founder of the Scappino, a luxury fashion house in Turin, Italy. Together they had two children: Giuliana, a film producer and wife of director Sergio Capogna, and Carlo, an economist.

In 1959, Scappino published Il poema di Gesù ("The Poem of Jesus") for which she was nominated twice for the Nobel Prize in Literature by Accademia dei Lincei member Alfredo Galletti in 1961 and 1962. During the same years, member of the Italian Parliament Ugo Redano nominated her for the Nobel Peace Prize "in the hope that her voice, singing about human brotherhood, will become a sign of harmony for the divided humanity."

She also published other two books Umanità ("Humanity") and Il cerchio dell'amore ("The Circle of Love"). She was also a journalist for the magazine "Il Mattino" (Naples). Scappino died in the 1982 in Bologna, Italy.
