= Kathleen Mary Tillotson =

English literary scholar (1906–2001)

Kathleen Tillotson CBE, FBA, FRSL
- Born: Kathleen Mary Constable; 3 April 1906; Berwick-upon-Tweed, England
- Died: 3 June 2001 (aged 95); London, England
- Education: Somerville College, Oxford
- Occupations: Academic and literary critic
- Spouse: Geoffrey Tillotson
- Children: 2
- Parent(s): Eric and Catherine Constable

Kathleen Mary Tillotson CBE, FBA, FRSL (3 April 1906 – 3 June 2001) was a British academic and literary critic, professor of English and distinguished Victorian scholar. Her various works on Elizabethan literature have accumulated significance in the literary sphere, conducting important research and producing publications that feature her editorship. Her work has encouraged many to become involved with literary research.

== Early life and education ==
Kathleen Mary Tillotson (née Constable) was born in Berwick-upon-Tweed, England, on 3 April 1906 to Eric and Catherine Constable. Her parents were members of the Society of Friends (Quakers), from which she dissociated officially in 1949. She attended Ackworth School, Pontefract and The Mount School, York, before graduating with a degree in English from Somerville College, Oxford, in 1927. She then studied for the B.Litt under the supervision of David Nichol Smith and George Gordon, her fellow students including future husband Geoffrey Tillotson, and John Butt.

== Academic career ==
Kathleen Tillotson's interest in literature was originally influenced by her father's occupation as a journalist. The beginning of her academic years consisted of graduating in English from Somerville College, Oxford, in 1927. In 1929 she started work as a part-time assistant in the English Department at Bedford College, London, before being promoted in 1933 to Junior Lecturer and, in 1937, to Lecturer (part-time). She eventually became a full-time lecturer at Bedford College in 1939 and was promoted to Senior Lecturer in January 1947, and in October of that year became a University Reader. She was appointed Hildred Carlile Professor of English Literature in 1958, a post from which she retired in 1971.

Her academic achievements centred on her vast scholarly endeavours and she was noted as "one of the most distinguished Victorian scholars of our time". Her achievements include her Pilgrim edition of Dickens's letters, Clarendon edition of Dickens and becoming General Editor between 1957 and 1994. Tillotson's focus was analytical of narrative conventions and traditional in criticism. However, her research spanned manifold literary genres and showed an appreciation of Elizabethan literature. Her notable works include Novels of the Nineteen-Forties, Mid-Victorian Studies, and editions of Jane Austen's letters to her sister, and Oliver Twist. Tillotson's work has been described as an "enlightening survey of the literary, social, and moral contexts of the decade". In 1963, Tillotson and her husband Geoffrey also edited and annotated William Makepeace Thackeray's Vanity Fair.

Tillotson was elected both a Fellow of the British Academy and an Honorary Fellow of Somerville in 1965, and a Fellow of the Royal Society of Literature in 1984. She received honorary doctorates from Queen's University, Belfast (1972) and, in 1982, from the University of Oxford and the University of London. She was appointed an Officer of the Order of the British Empire (OBE) in 1983, raised to CBE in 1991.

In 1995, Tillotson developed an illness that affected and restricted her work, although she continued to work until her 90s.

== Personal life ==
In 1933, she married Geoffrey Tillotson, who at the time was an Assistant Lecturer at University College London. The Tillotsons undertook advisory work for publishers, for government departments and for academic institutions, and were members of numerous literary societies. A great deal of correspondence has survived from these activities and with friends they made throughout their lives.

She adopted two sons. Her husband's early death in 1969 caused her much grief; however, she continued her scholarly work.

During the Second World War, Bedford College was evacuated to Cambridge, where Kathleen would often cycle around town with her eldest son Edmund in the bicycle basket. She shared with her husband a love of the countryside and walking, with the Lake District as their favourite holiday destinations. In the 1950s and 1960s, Geoffrey and Kathleen were regularly seen walking from Hampstead Heath to Regent's Park.

However, she was a staunch and passionate anti-Conservative and welcomed the Open University. She lamented the sale of Bedford College's buildings in Regent's Park, central London. The cause of justice and equality for women was also close to her heart, which related closely to her intense loyalty to Bedford College. This loyalty continued strongly after her retirement in 1971, and it was a great sadness to her when in 1985 the college was amalgamated with Royal Holloway and the new institution became fully co-educational. Her time was also consumed with studying and researching in the British Library.

Tillotson died in London on 3 June 2001, aged 95. Kathleen Tillotson has been described as "witty", "formidable" and will be "long remembered with affection and gratitude by large numbers of people".

== Works ==
Tillotson collaborated with J. W. Hebel and Bernard Newdigate on The works of Michael Drayton, which won the British Academy's Rose Mary Crawshay Prize in 1943. Working with John Butt, she published Dickens at Work in 1957 and edited Oliver Twist in 1966. She was a main editor of Volume 4 of the letters of Charles Dickens (Pilgrim Edition), which was published in 1977. She published Novels of the Eighteen-Forties (1954) and The Woman in White (1969), with Anthea Trodd, and, with her husband, published joint essays: Mid-Victorian Studies (1965), Vanity Fair (Riverside edition, 1963).
