= Marie Noël =

French writer and poet (1883–1967)

Servant of God Marie Noël
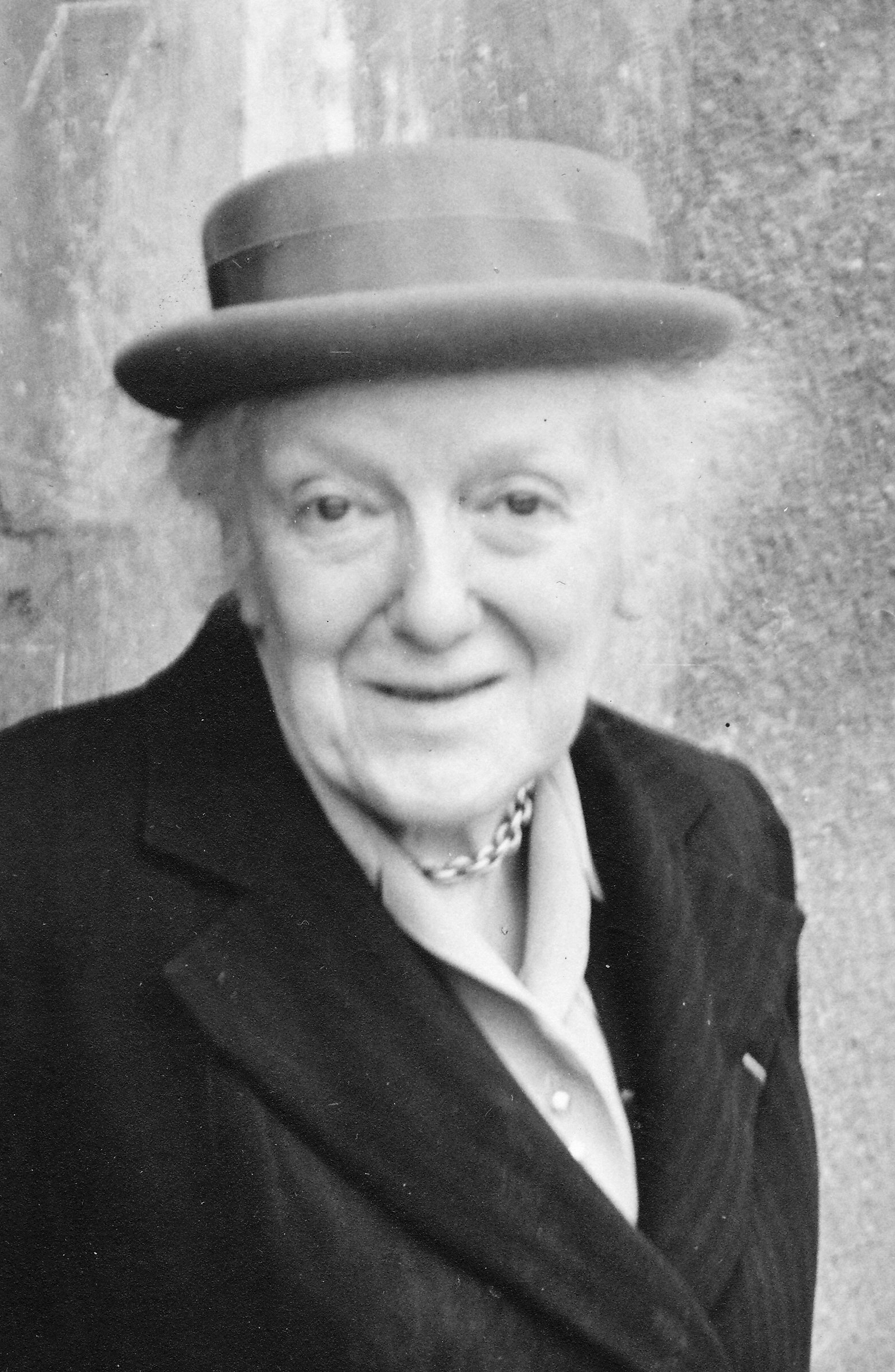
- Born: 16 February 1883; Auxerre, France
- Died: 23 December 1967 (aged 84); Auxerre, France

Marie Noël, born Marie-Mélanie Rouget (Auxerre, 16 February 1883 – 23 December 1967), was a French poet, a devout Catholic laywoman and officer of the Légion d'honneur. She was affectionately called "the Warbler of Auxerre".

== Biography ==
=== Early life ===
Marie Noël came from a well-educated family that respected Catholic heritage but did not go above and beyond what was required of them—attending services when needed. Her father, Louis Rouget, was an agrégé in philosophy and a professor at the Collège d' Auxerre teaching both philosophy and art history. Her mother, Marie-Émélie-Louise Barat, was a devout Christian who was naturally happier and more outgoing than her father. Her family originated in Auxerre and had been river companions since the 1400s. They then became ship carpenters and, in the 18th century, building contractors.

=== Death ===
Having become almost blind, she died peacefully on 23 December 1967, having taken holy communion one last time. Her funeral took place at Église Saint-Pierre d'Auxerre and was buried in the family grave in the Saint-Amâtre cemetery in Auxerre.

== Literary career ==
Marie Noël was a deeply religious and even mystical woman, but she was also a passionate and tormented person. She is often only recognized for her "traditional song" works, which diminishes the literary value and emotional depth of her darker writings. One such poem is "Howl," which is the title of another of her poems, and it depicts the true "howl" of a mother torn between her almost animal suffering and her faith in God's acceptance. Based on Jeanne-Marie Baude's reading of the Notes intimes, this passage highlights a particularly emotional torn between faith and despair that culminates in a blasphemous outburst immediately repented.

Among the intellectuals she corresponded with during her period were Henry de Montherlant, François Mauriac, Jean Cocteau, Colette and Marthe Bibesco. She was also a close friend of French diplomat Léon Noël. In 1960, she was nominated for the Nobel Prize in Literature by the literary critic Maurice Bémol.

== Beatification ==
On 10 October 2017, the Archbishop of Sens-Auxerre Hervé Giraud officially opened her cause for beatification.

== Awards and honors ==
- 1923: Prix Archon-Despérouses for Les chansons et les heures
- 1923: Prix Heredia for Les chansons et les heures
- 1940: Prix Alice-Louis Barthou
- 1949: Prix d’Académie
- 1953: Prix Alice-Louis Barthou
- 1958: Prix de la Paulée de Meursault
- 1962: Grand Prix de Poésie de l'Académie Française

== Publications ==
=== Poetry collections ===
- Les Chansons et les Heures ("The Songs and the Hours", 1922)
- Noël de l'Avent ("Advent Christmas", 1928)
- Chants de la Merci ("Songs of Mercy", 1930)
- Le Rosaire des joies ("The Rosary of Joys", 1930)
- Chants sauvages ("Wild Songs", 1936)
- Contes ("Tales", 1944)
- Chants et psaumes d'automne ("Autumn Songs and Psalms", 1947)
- Petit-Jour ("Little Day", 1951)
- L'Âme en peine ("The Soul in Trouble", 1954)
- L'Œuvre poétique ("The Poetic Work", 1956)
- Notes intimes ("Intimate Notes", 1959)
- La Rose rouge ("The Red Rose", 1960)
- Chants d’arrière saison ("Songs of the Late Season", 1961)

=== Posthumous collections ===
- Le Cru d'Auxerre ("The Auxerre Vintage", 1967)
- Le Chant du chevalier ("The Knight's Song", 1969)
- L'Œuvre en prose ("The Work in Prose", 1976)
- Le Chemin d'Anna Bargeton ("The Path of Anna Bargeton", 1986)
- Almanach pour une jeune fille triste ("Almanac for a Sad Young Girl", 2011)
