= Perspektivet Museum =

Building in Tromsø, Norway

Coordinates: 69°39′08″N 18°57′33″E

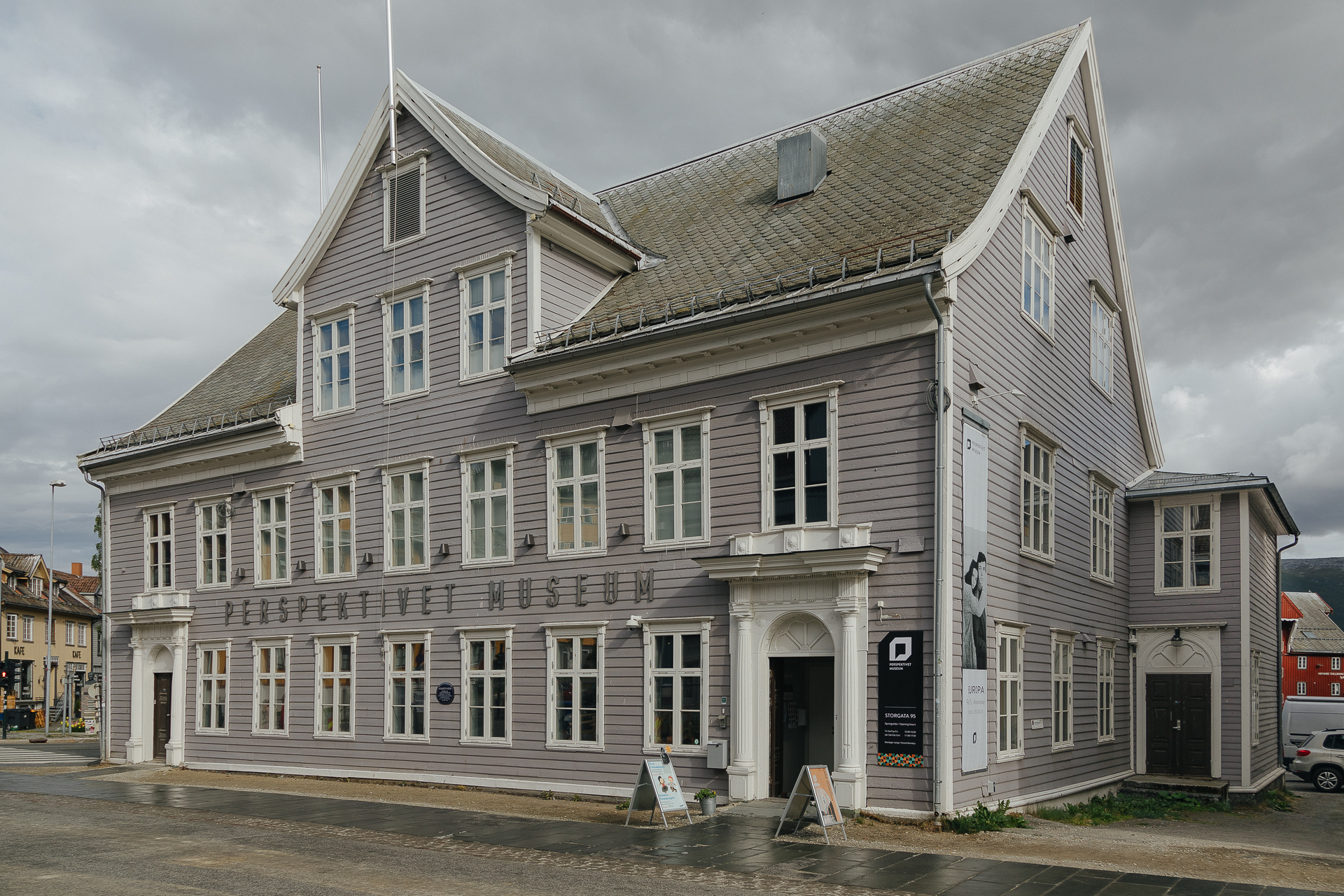
- Building of Perspektivet Museum in Storgata 95, Tromsø
- Established: 1996
- Location: Tromsø, Norway
- Director: Marianne A. Olsen
- Curator: Marthe Tolnes Fjellestad
- Employees: 14
- Website: https://perspektivet.no/

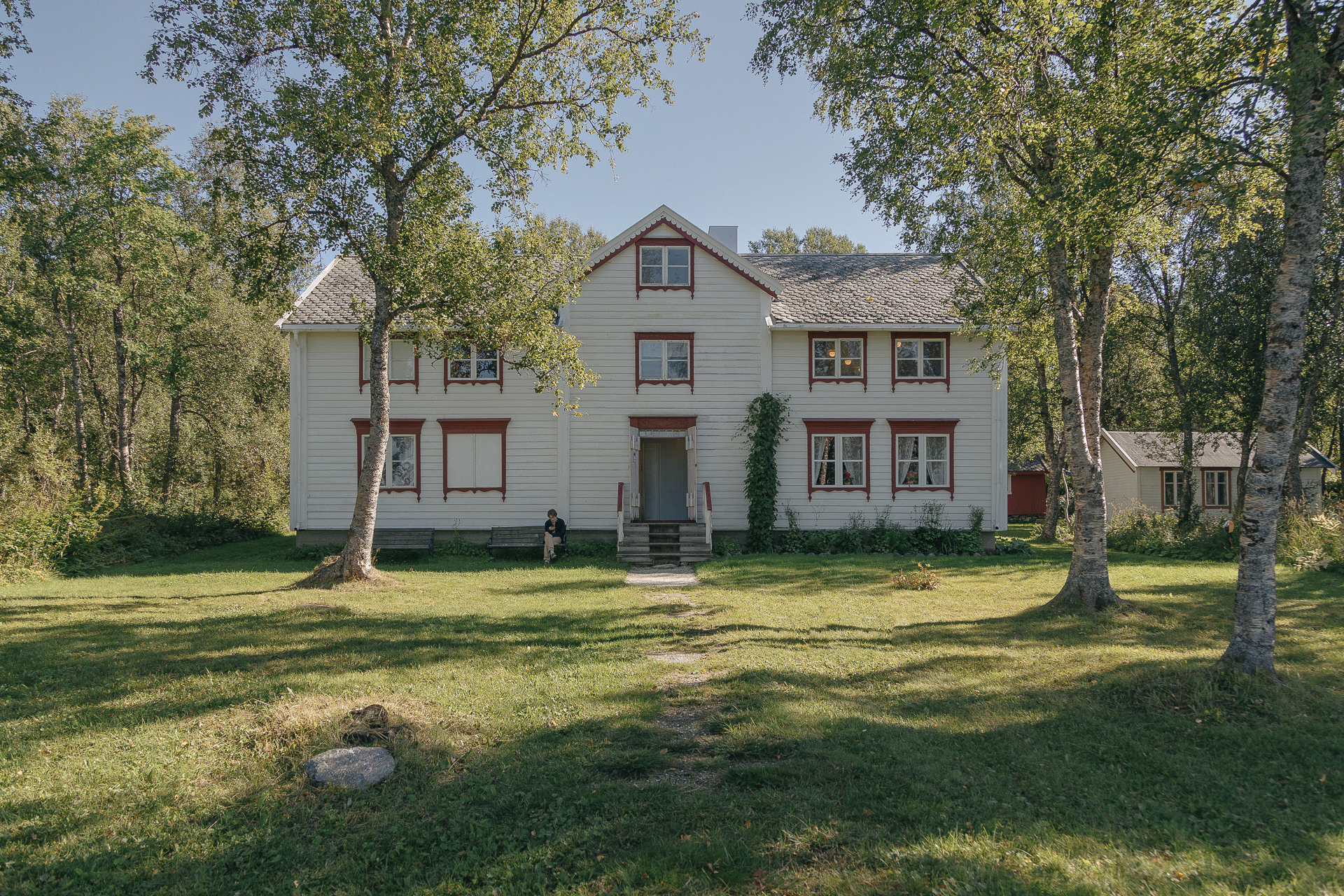
Kvitnesgården trading post

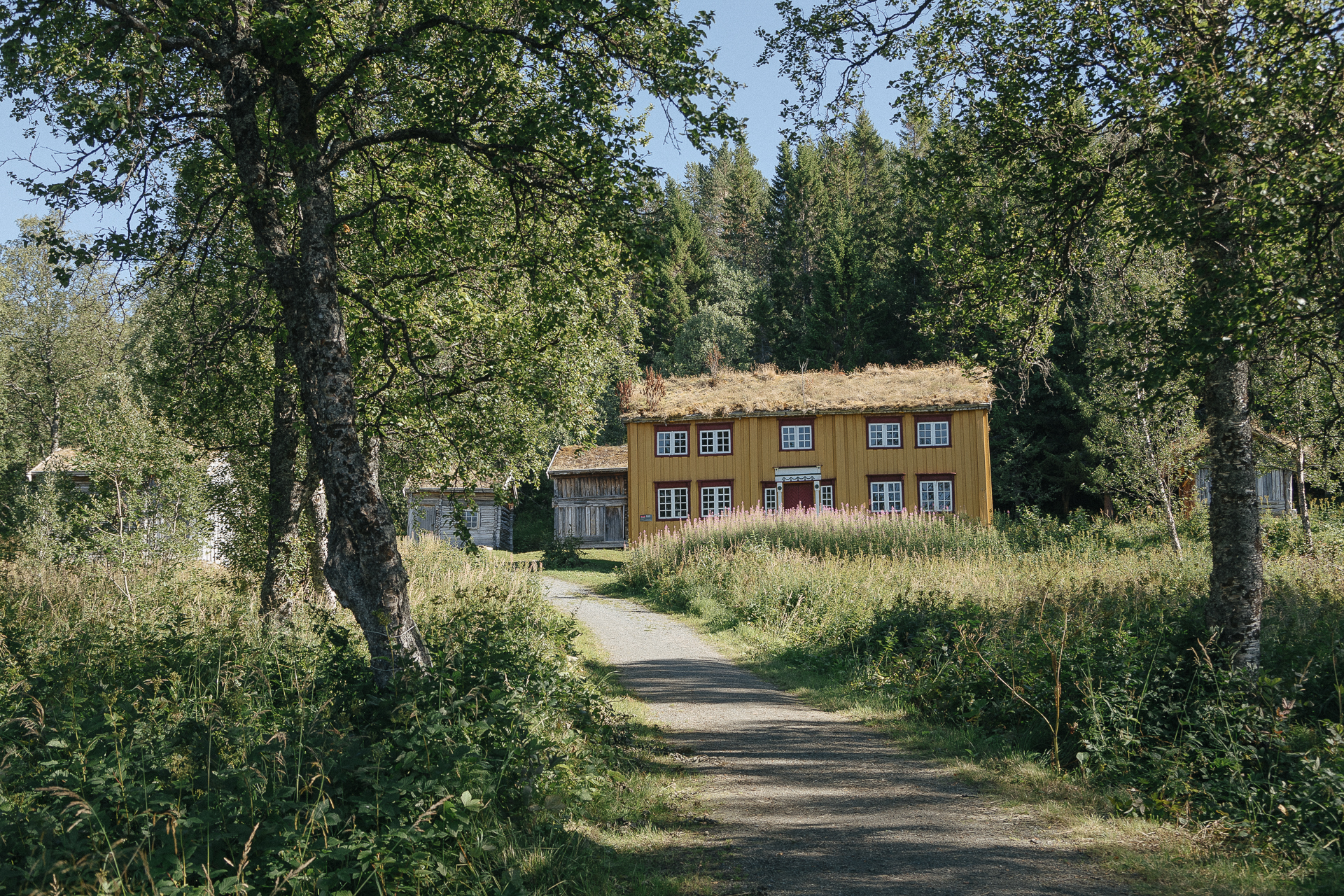
Mortengården farmstead

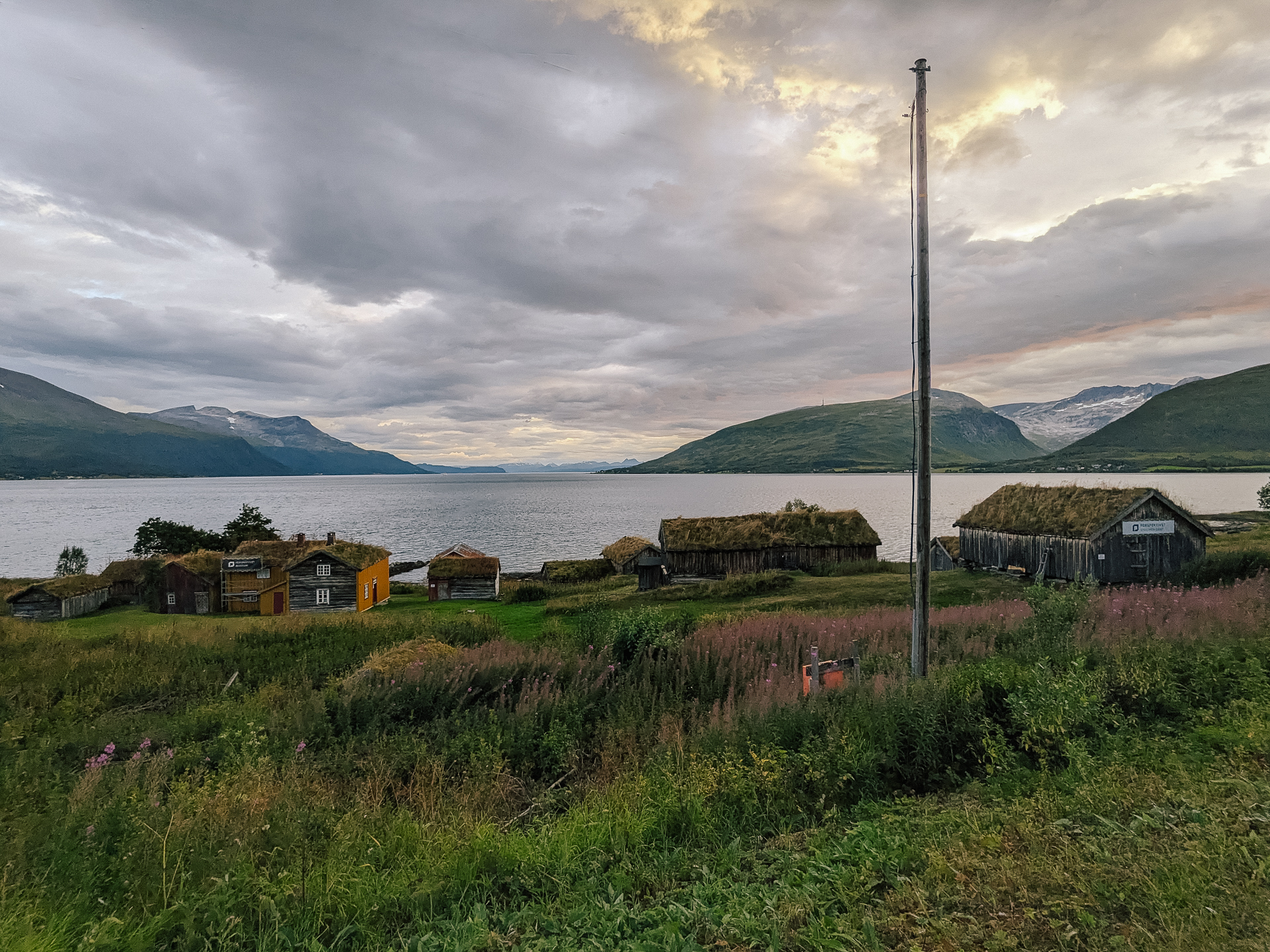
Straumen farm

Perspektivet Museum is a foundation in Tromsø established in 1996, with the aim of imparting and developing knowledge as a basis for understanding connections in life, creating tolerance for cultural diversity, and contributing alternative perspectives on culture and society. The main collection of the museum is located in Tromsø in the building which was the home of the famous Norwegian author Sara Fabricius better known by her pseudonym Cora Sandel.

When it was established, Troms Folkemuseum and the collections at Tromsø City Museum were included in the new foundation. In addition to the main building in the center of Tromsø, the museum owns two open-air facilities with a total of 24 antiquarian buildings that are part of the summer season's dissemination program. The scope and content of the collections, therefore, reflect the museum history of Tromsø and its surroundings from the 1950s onwards. The museum is part of the national museum network and participates in networks for minorities and cultural diversity and in networks for contemporary documentation and research. The two open-air facilities include Folkeparken (former Troms Folkemuseum) in Tromsøya Island and Straumen gård in Straumsbukta on Kvaløya island.

Dissemination of photography within the documentary genre is an important field of activity at the museum, which forms part of an international collaboration.

In 2017, the museum received 25 paintings painted by Cora Sandel as a testamentary gift from Sandel's son Erik Jönsson.

== Storgata 95 ==
In 2004, the new museum was opened in Storgata 95, a house that from 1911 until 2001 functioned as a meeting place for workers (Norwegian: Folkets Hus). The house at Storgata 95 in Bergen Empire style was originally built in 1838 by Johan Friedrich Daniel Mack (1800–1875), a merchant and consul from Braunschweig, Germany. Its architecture is influenced by architecture in Bergen by its horizontal paneling, the half circle windows above the entrance door, a slightly bending roof, and the large roof dormer. Johan Friedrich Daniel Mack was a businessman, a large exporter, and a significant shipowner in Tromsø. One of his younger brothers was Georg Andreas Ludvig Mack (1805–1878), a father of Ludwig Marcus Mack (1842–1915), founder of the famous Mack Brewery in Tromsø. The second wife of Johan Friedrich Daniel Mack was Nanna Sabine Klerck, a daughter of a Norwegian merchant and Storting representative Wilhelm Henrik Klerck from Alta, one of the richest people in Finnmark. The house was owned by the Mack family until 1894 when it was bought by businessman and politician Johan Henrik Rye Holmboe (1863-1933), who was a wholesaler and barrel factory owner. Johan Rye Holmboe lived there with his wife Johanne Adolfa and five children from 1894 until 1900. Other residents of the house included superior court prosecutor Carl Skaar with his wife Betty and three children, Martine Clodius, and housekeeper Hansine Petrine Fredriksen. The Skaar family was succeeded by Jens Schow Fabricius and his family. They moved to Storgata 95 from Bankgata 13 after the turn of the century and their daughter Sara, later known as the writer Cora Sandel, lived here until 1906. Fabricius' family moved to Tromsø in 1893, but Sara Fabricius went to Kristiania in 1897 after finishing secondary school. But in 1902 Sara Fabricius after not receiving a scholarship as a painter had to move from Kristiania to Tromsø, where Jens Schow Fabricius worked as a naval officer. In 1906 after the death of her mother Sara Fabricius moved to Paris to train as a painter. In June 1911 the house was bought by Tromsø Cooperative Workers' Unions (Norwegian: Tromsø Samvirkende Arbeiderforeninger) and became the town's first "People's House". In 2001, the house was advertised for sale, but then Tromsø municipality stepped in as a tenant and established the Perspektivet Museum.

== Folkeparken ==
The Folkeparken facility is located at the southern tip of Tromsøya island close to Telegrafbukta and consists of two yards. Troms Folkemuseum erected the first building in Folkeparken in 1963. Several enthusiasts inspired by open-air museums in the south of the country had been working on the site for 40 years prior to the opening. The buildings of the site come from Tromsø and the neighboring Balsfjord Municipality, Karlsøy Municipality, and Ibestad Municipality. They are divided into two yards, the trading post and the coastal farm.

Located next to the shore, the Kvitnesgården building built in 1826 was originally the main building at the trading post Kvitnes on Vannøya in Nord-Troms. It was relocated in 1966.

Located closer to the forest, the whole Mortengården farmstead includes seven log buildings with turf roofs. These seven buildings were relocated to this site from different farms of Troms after the Second World War to represent a typical coastal farm from the 19th century. The main Mortengården building was originally a two-room living room built in the second half of the 18th century from Straumshamna on Kvaløya. It has no external cladding except for the sea-facing facade painted yellow.

== Straumen gård ==
There was an early settlement at Straumen farm (Norwegian: Straumen gård) as the place is well placed in relation to resources both in the sea and on land. The most important resource is the Rystraumen Strait, which provides good fishing including pollock. Most of the buildings on the site are from the 19th century. Along the shore, there are houses for people and catering, while barns, stables, and barns are located at the outer edge of the yard.

== Gallery ==
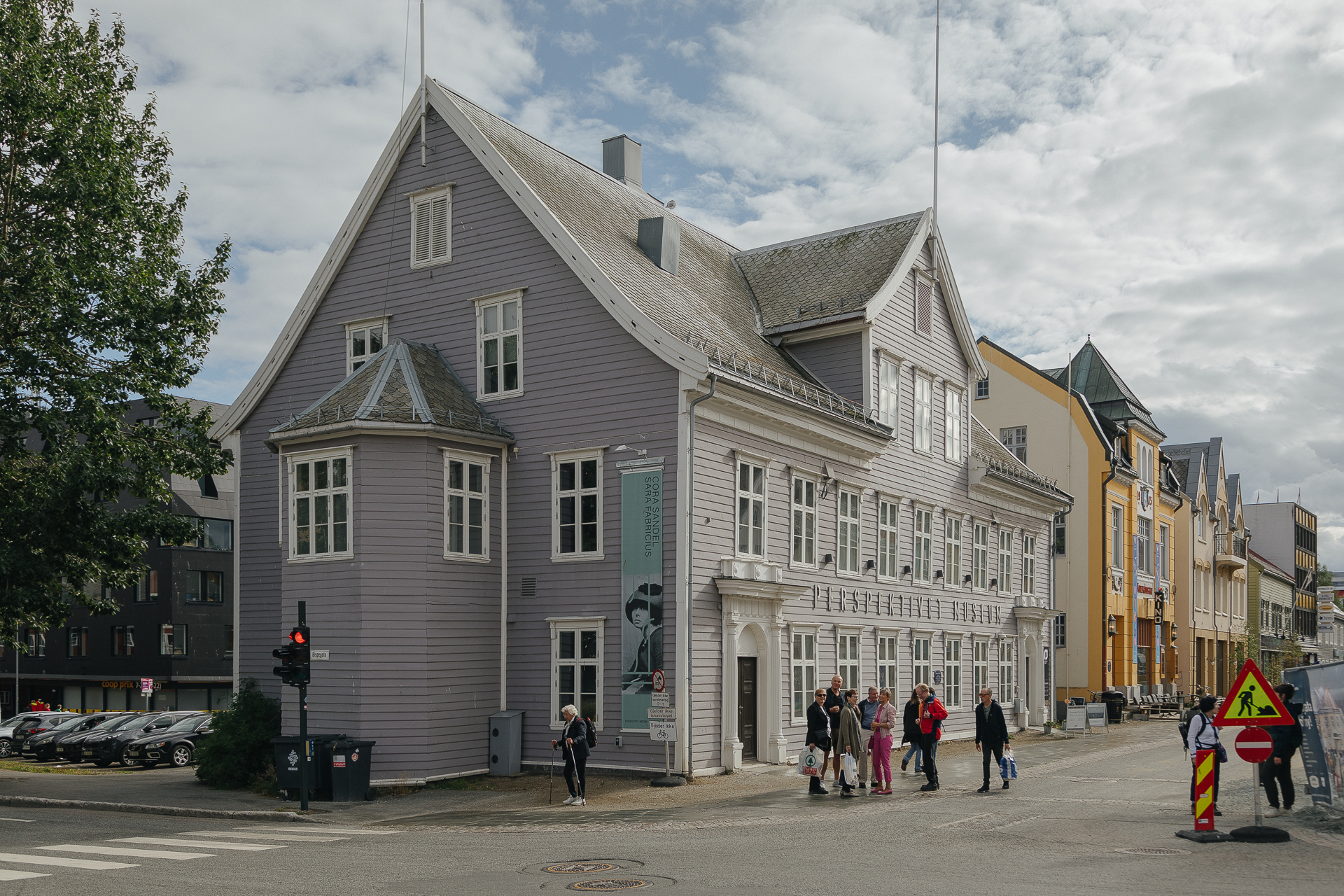
Museum view from Bispegata

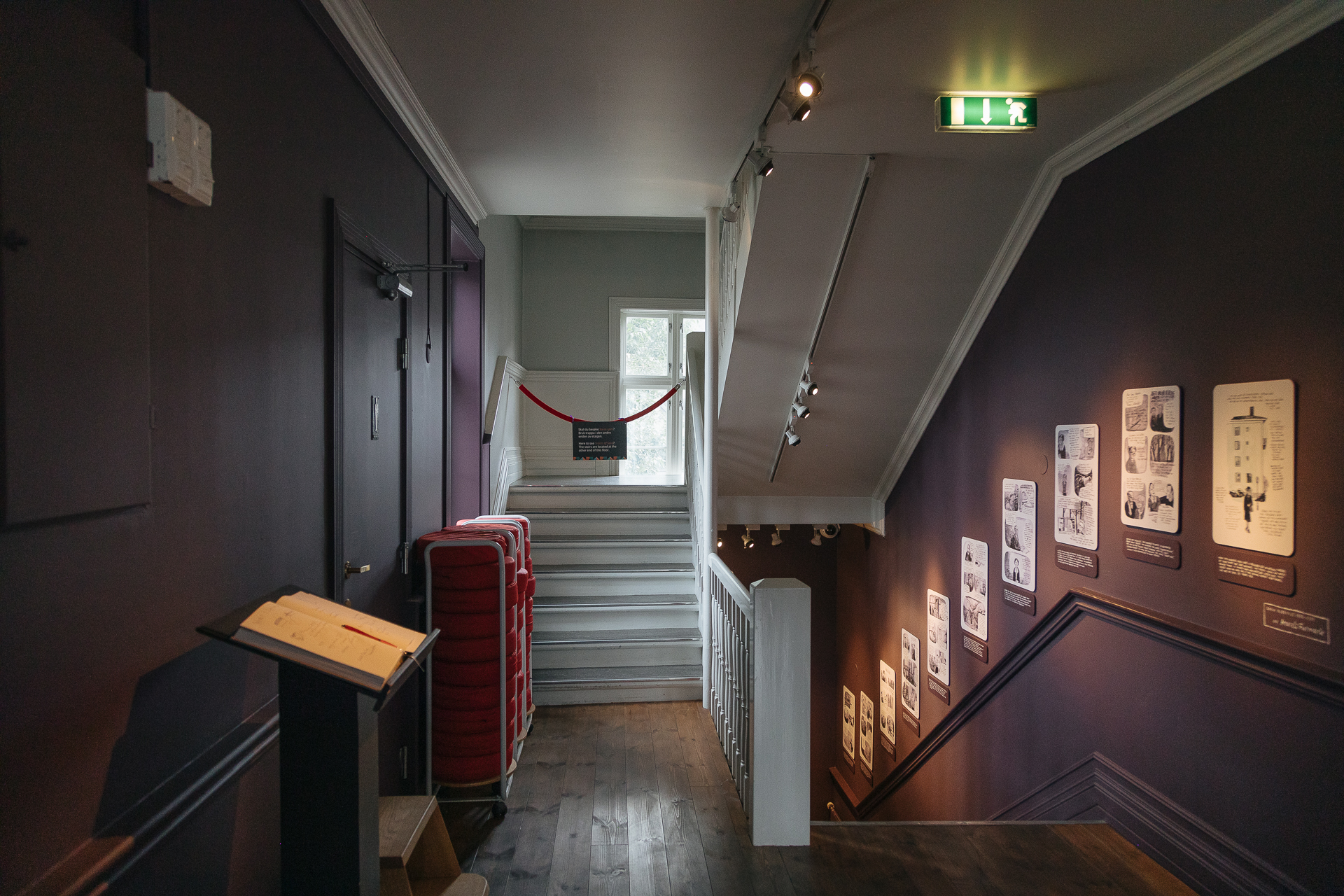
Museum stairs

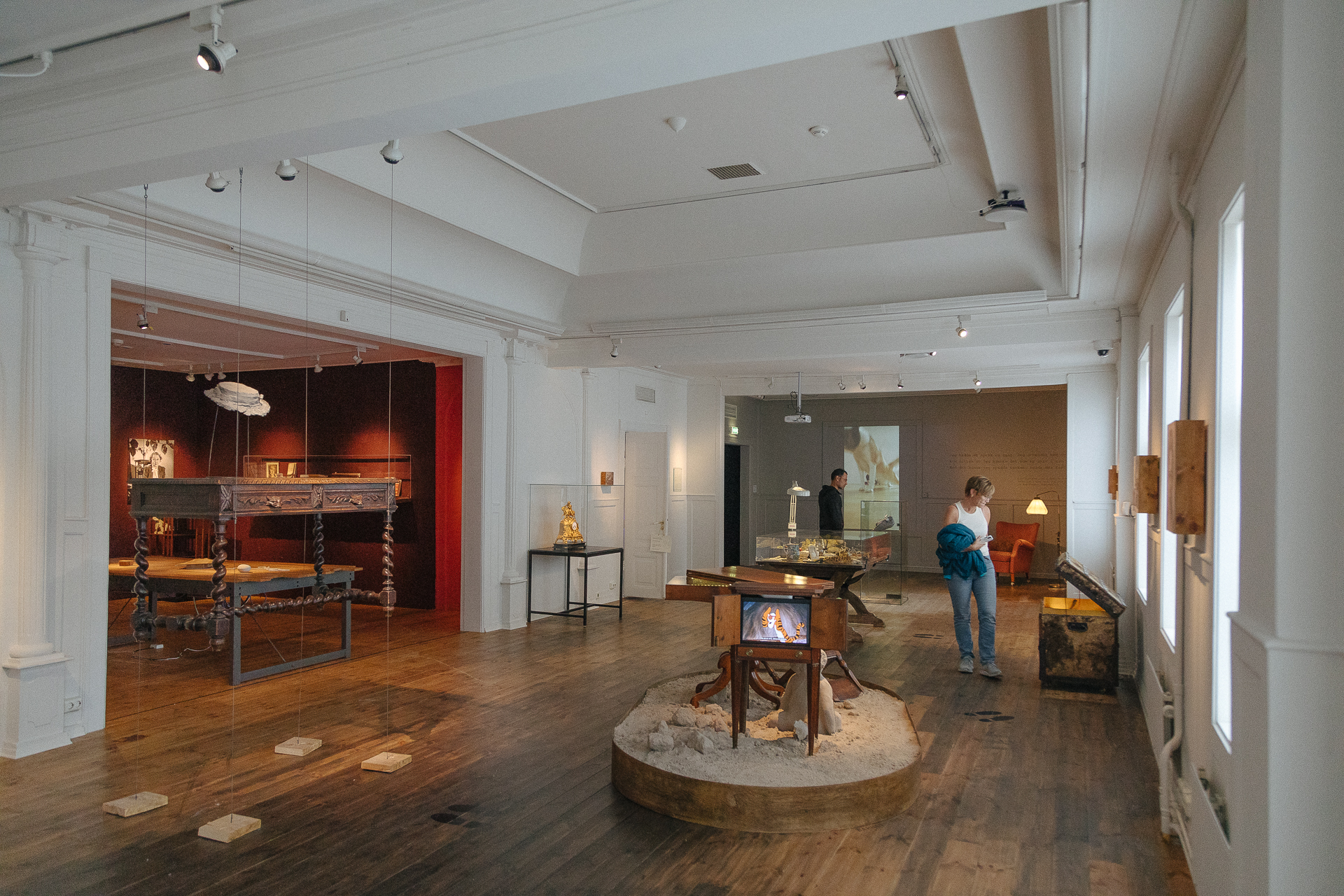
Museum interiors, permanent exposition

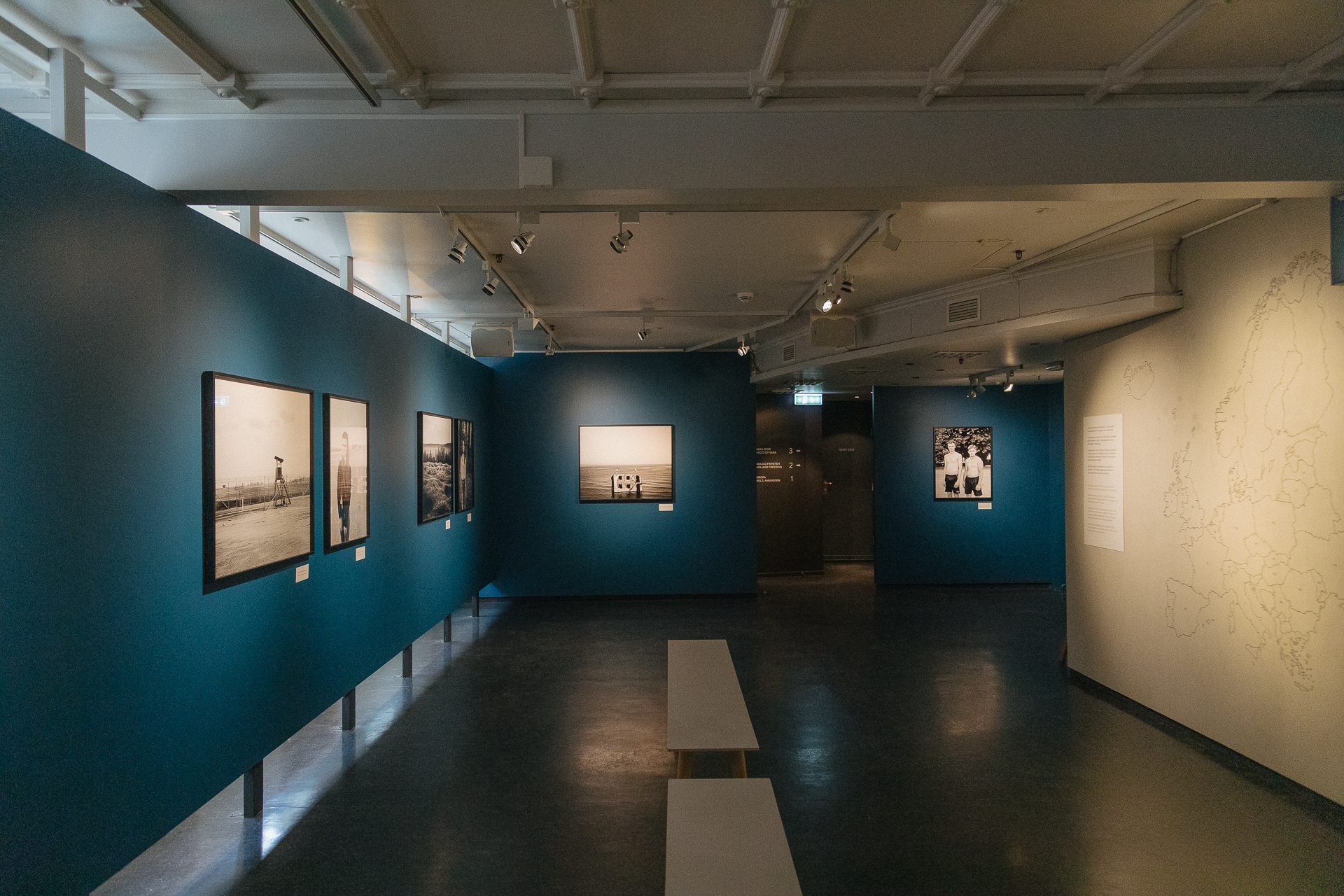
Museum interiors, temporary exposition
