= Pietro Ubaldi =

Italian philosopher

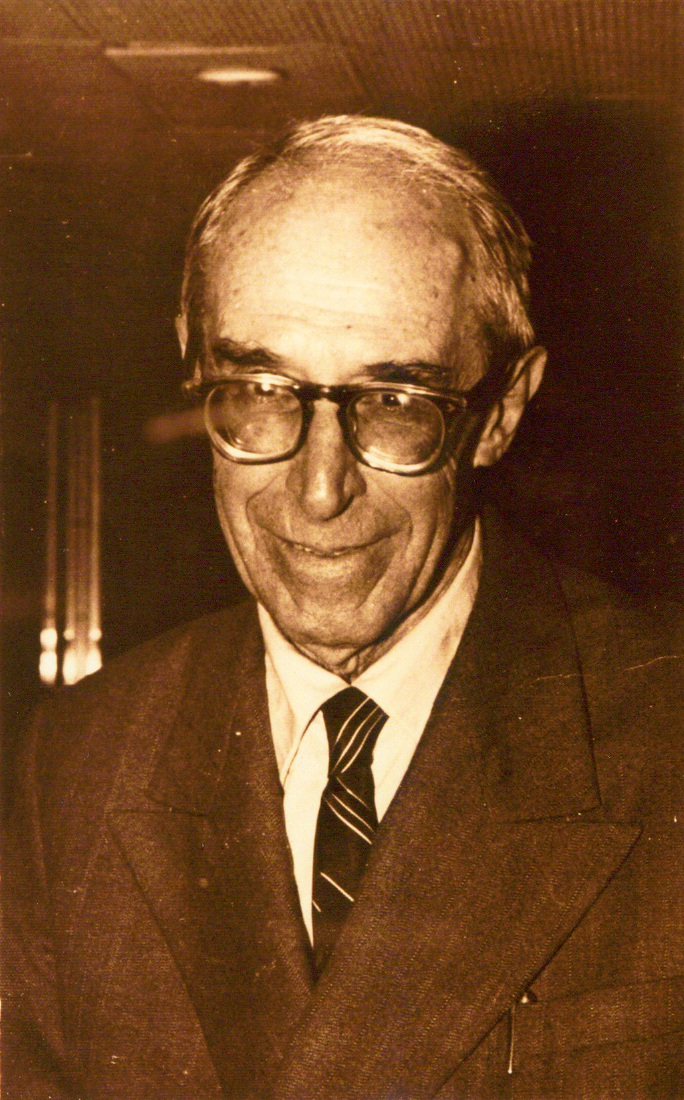
- Born: 18 August 1886; Foligno, Italy
- Died: 29 February 1972; São Vicente, São Paulo, Brazil
- Occupations: Philosopher; theologian; teacher
- Awards: Nobel Prize in Literature (nominated 5 times)

Pietro Ubaldi (August 18, 1886 in Foligno, Italy – February 29, 1972 in São Vicente, Brazil) was an Italian philosopher, theologian and teacher. He was nominated for the Nobel Prize in Literature five times.

== Biography ==
Ubaldi was graduated in Law and Music, at Rome. A student of various philosophical and religious traditions, he distinguished himself as a Christian thinker. He had two children, Agnese and Franco, who died during the second world war. A descendant of an affluent family of Umbria, Ubaldi renounced richness to be faithful to the gospel. First he went to Sicily to teach English in a secondary school, then, always as a teacher, he went to Gubbio, where he lived for twenty years.

Ubaldi authored 24 books: 12 in Italy and 12 in Brazil. The Great Synthesis is considered one of his principal works.

== List of books ==
Since most of Pietro Ubaldi's books are not available in English, titles are only a translation of their Italian versions and might vary once formally published.

1 – Great Messages
2 – The Great Synthesis (Synthesis and Solution to the Problems of Science and Spirit)
3 – Mental Currents (The Nours)
4 – Mystical Ascent
5 – Story of a Man
6 – Fragments of Thought and Passion
7 – The New Civilization of the Third Millennium
8 – Problems of the Future
9 – Human Ascents
10 – God and the Universe
11 – Prophecies (The Future of the World)
12 – Commentaries
13 – Current Problems
14 – The System (Genesis and Structure of the Universe)
15 – The Great Battle
16 – Evolution and the Gospel
17 – The Law of God
18 – The Functional Technique of the Law of God
19 – Fall and Salvation
20 – Principles of a New Ethics
21 – The Descent of Ideals
22 – A Destiny Following Christ
23 – How to Orient One's Life
24 – Christ
