= Scappino (fashion house) =

Italian luxury fashion house

- Company type: Fashion
- Industry: Retail
- Founded: 1914; 112 years ago in Turin, Italy
- Founder: Domenico Scappino
- Headquarters: Lake Como, Italy
- Products: Silk goods
- Website: scappino.com

Scappino (Italian pronunciation: [skapˈpiːno]) is an Italian luxury fashion house created in 1914 by Domenico Scappino in Turin, Italy, specializing in silk products like ready-to-wear ties, shoes, watches, jewellery, accessories, sunglasses, and fragrances.

== History ==
Scappino was founded in 1914 in Turin, when World War I started. Within few years the brand started getting recognized in Europe, eventually opening boutiques across the continent. During the 1930s, the Prince of Piedmont, Umberto II, designated Scappino as the official supplier of the Royal House. The company later expanded operations in Latin America, opening boutiques in Mexico and Argentina. With the outbreak of World War II, many shops in Europe were closed. Because it was not involved in the war, Mexico continued to demand the company's products, as interest in the country spread. At the end of the war, some shops reopened in Italy as well.

As of today, Scappino is an emporium dedicated especially to silk products.

== See also ==
- Fashion
