= Gordon S. Haight =

American academic (1901-1985)

Gordon Sherman Haight
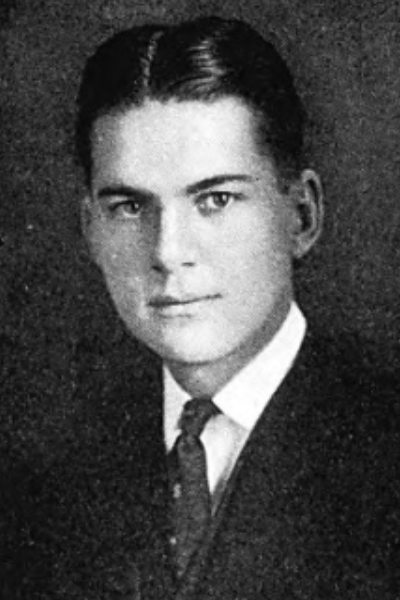
- Gordon S. Haight, from the 1923 yearbook of Yale University
- Born: February 6, 1901; Muskegon, Michigan, US
- Died: December 28, 1985 (aged 84); Woodbridge, Connecticut, US

Academic background
- Education: Yale University

Academic work
- Discipline: English literature
- Institutions: Yale University
- Notable works: George Eliot: A Biography

Gordon Sherman Haight (February 6, 1901 – December 28, 1985) was an American professor of English at Yale University from 1950 to 1968. He was the author of George Eliot: A Biography (1968) and the editor of The George Eliot Letters (1954–1955).

== Early life and education ==
Haight was born in Muskegon, Michigan, the son of Lewis Pease Haight and Grace Carpenter Haight. He graduated from Yale University in 1923, and earned his Ph.D. there in 1933, with a dissertation on English poet Francis Quarles.

== Career ==
Haight taught at the Kent School and the Hotchkiss School as a young man. He taught English at Yale University beginning in 1933, was master of Pierson College from 1949 to 1953, and was a full professor from 1950 to 1968. He was recognized as an expert on author George Eliot. His biography of George Eliot won the Van Wyck Brooks Memorial Award and James Tait Black Memorial Prize. In 1980, he was invited to give the dedication speech when a memorial stone for Eliot was placed in Westminster Abbey's Poets' Corner.

== Personal life ==
Haight married Mary Nettleton in 1937. He died at home in Woodbridge, Connecticut, in December 1985, at the age of 84.

== Works ==
- "Longfellow and Mrs. Sigourney" (1930)
- Mrs. Sigourney, The Sweet Singer of Hartford (1930)
- "The Publication of Quarles' Emblems" (1934)
- "The Sources of Quarles' Emblems" (1935)
- "Francis Quarles in the Civil War" (1936)
- "The John William De Forest Collection" (1940)
- "Cross's Biography of George Eliot" (1950)
- "Dickens and Lewes on Spontaneous Combustion" (1958)
- "George Meredith and the Westminster Review" (1958)
- "H. G. Wells' The Man of the Year Million" (1958)
- Adam Bede (1964, introduction)
- George Eliot: A Biography (1968)
- George Eliot's Originals and Contemporaries: Essays in Victorian Literary History and Biography (1992, published posthumously)

== Works edited by Gordon S. Haight ==
- Edward FitzGerald and the Rubaiyat (1942)
- Francis Bacon, Essays and New Atlantis (1942)
- The George Eliot Letters, 7 vols. (1954–55)
- George Eliot, The Mill on the Floss
- A century of George Eliot criticism (1965)
- George Eliot & John Chapman, with Chapman's Diaries (1969; first edition 1940)
- George Eliot: A Centenary Tribute (1982, with Rosemary T. VanArsdel)
