= Ingerid Dal =

Norwegian linguist

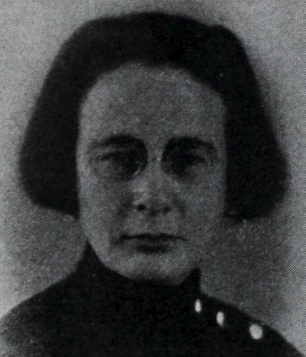
IngeridDal

Ingerid Dal (2 August 1895 – 17 February 1985) was a Norwegian linguist known for her work and research of German, English and the Nordic languages.

== Early life and education ==
Dal was born in Drammen, Norway. She attended Kristiana University after moving to Oslo at age 19. Following World War I, she moved to Germany where she attended Heidelberg University and studied philology and philosophy. She then attended the University of Hamburg where she continued her studies and, in 1925, presented her thesis on Lask's Kategorienlehre in relation to Kant's philosophy. In 1930, she finished her thesis at the University of Oslo on the origin and use of old Nordic expletive particles.

== Career ==
In 1930, Dal began work at the University of Oslo as a research assistant. She then became a professor of German philology until 1965. During this time she made a significant number of research contributions to her field. In particular, she wrote a paper on the history of weak-toned prefixes in the Nordic languages that was later published in the Norsk Tidsskrift for Sprogvitenskap. As well, she published a paper on the origins of the present participle in the English language. In 1940, she became a fellow of the Norwegian Academy of Science and Letters. In 1952, she researched and published a study of German syntax in the "Sammlung kurzer Grammatiken germanischer Dialekte," a common university textbook. Then in 1954, Dal was awarded the Nansen medal for Outstanding Research. In 1958, she became a fellow of the Norwegian Academy for Language and Literature. She was then presented the Goethe Gold Medal for her work with the German language abroad. In 1972, the Norwegian General Scientific Research Committee presented a collection of her research papers, under the title of "Research into the History of the German Language."
