= Rolf Westman =

Finnish antiquarian and professor

Rolf Westman (21 June 1927 – 12 January 2017) was a Finnish antiquarian and professor of Greek and Latin at the Åbo Akademi University from 1958 to 1993. He visited the University of Cambridge to give lectures.
