= Howard R. Marraro =

American historian

Howard Rosario Marraro (August 19, 1897 in Regalbuto, Sicily - January 25, 1972, in New York) was an Italian-American historian, writer of more than a dozen books on Italian literature, history, and culture.

Marraro emigrated to the United States with his family in 1905. He studied at Columbia University, earning BA, MA and PhD (in 1932) degrees. Starting in 1925, he worked at the university, as a Lecturer, Instructor, Assistant Professor, Associate Professor, and Full Professor. Marraro retired in 1965.

Since 1973 the Howard R. Marraro Prize in Italian History is awarded annually to honor an author of a book or article dealing with Italian history or Italo-American history or relations.

== Selected works ==
- American opinion on the unification of Italy, 1846–1861, PhD thesis, Columbia University Press, 1932. Republished in 1969 by AMS Press.
- Diplomatic relations between the United States and the Kingdom of the Two Sicilies from 1816 to 1861, 2 vol., S.F. Vanni, 1951–1952, ISBN 0-913298-56-5.
- L'unificazione italiana vista dai diplomatici statunitensi, 3 vol., Istituto per la Storia del Risorgimento Italiano, Rome, 1963–1966, edited by Howard R. Marraro.
- "Italian Music and Actors in America During the Eighteenth Century." Italica 23, no. 2 (June, 1946): 103–17.
- "Interpretation of Italy and the Italians in Eighteenth Century America." Italica 25, no. 1 (March, 1948): 59–81.
