= Harald Ofstad =

Norwegian moral philosopher

Harald Frithjof Seiersted Ofstad (13 October 1920 – 5 October 1994) was a Norwegian moral philosopher. He was Professor in Applied Philosophy at Stockholm University for more than 30 years.

Born in Bergen, the youngest son of a high-ranking police officer, Ofstad passed the examen artium in 1939 and completed a degree in law in 1945 before changing to philosophy, which he studied under Arne Næss; he was part of the "Bergen group" and one of the most prominent exponents of Næss' "empirical semantics" approach. He became a cand. mag. in philosophy in 1946, studied in the United States at Yale University and other institutions as a Rockefeller Fellow in 1947–49, and was a University Fellow at the University of Oslo in 1949–54. He was appointed to a professorship in philosophy at the University of Bergen in 1954, but after only one year took a position as professor of applied philosophy at Stockholm University, where he remained until his retirement in 1987. He then returned to Bergen. He died in Oslo in 1994.

He married Erna Magnussen, a historian of literature, in 1945, and published a collection of essays with her in 1961.

Ofstad's interest in philosophy arose out of his encounter with Nazism during World War II, when Norway was occupied by Nazi Germany. He interpreted Nazism as a manifestation of the human tendency to feel contempt for weakness, a viewpoint which he developed in his 1971 book Vår forakt for svakhet (Our Contempt for Weakness). Like many of his generation, influenced by American social scientists and such thinkers as Theodor W. Adorno, he sought the origins of authoritarianism and nationalism. He was one of the most cited Norwegian moral philosophers and participated actively in the public debate in both Norway and Sweden; in 1978 he forcefully disagreed with Thorkild Hansen over the latter's book Processen mod Hamsun in a debate televised on NRK.

== Honours ==
- Member, Norwegian Academy of Science and Letters
- Knight of the Swedish Order of the Polar Star

== Selected publications ==
- with Christian Bay, Ingemund Gullväg and Herman Tönnessen. Nationalism: A Study of Identification with People and Power. 3 vols. Oslo: Institute for Social Research, 1950–53. OCLC 70362658.
- An Inquiry into the Freedom of Decision. Oslo: Norwegian Universities Press, 1961. OCLC 153882075
- with Erna Ofstad. Valg og Verdi (Choices and Values). Oslo: Aschehoug, 1961. OCLC 20272967. (in Norwegian).
- Vår forakt for svakhet. En analyse av nazismens normer og vurderinger. Oslo: Pax, 1971. ISBN 9788253000152. (in Norwegian). Trans. ed. Our Contempt for Weakness: Nazi Norms and Values—and Our Own. Gothenburg: Almqvist & Wiksell, 1989. ISBN 9789122012986.
- Ansvar og handling: diskusjoner av moral-, sosial- og rettsfilosofiske spørsmål (Responsibility and Action). Oslo: Universitetsforlaget, 1980. ISBN 9788200053163. (in Norwegian).
- Vi kan ändra världen: hur bör vi ställa frågorna? (We Can Have a New World). Stockholm: Prisma, 1987. ISBN 9789151816524. (in Swedish).
