= Jean Fabre (scholar) =

French literary scholar

Jean Fabre (13 December 1904 – 21 August 1975) was a French literary scholar, who specialised in the study of 18th century French literature. He was professor at the Faculté des lettres de Paris from 1952 to 1969.
