= Geoffrey Tillotson =

English literary scholar (1905–1969)

Geoffrey Tillotson, FBA (30 June 1905 – 15 October 1969) was an English literary scholar and academic. He was Professor of English Literature at Birkbeck College, London, from 1944 to 1969.

== Biography ==
The son of a millworker, he attended Keighley Grammar School before reading English at Balliol College, Oxford, on a county scholarship (graduating with a BA in 1927 and the BLitt in 1930), after which he worked briefly as a teacher, before lecturing at University College London from 1931 to 1944.

He was principally interested in the works of Alexander Pope and in 18th- and 19th-century literature and poetry; especially Victorian literature.

Some of the work was carried out with his wife, the literary scholar Kathleen Tillotson.

He was elected a Fellow of the British Academy (FBA) in 1967.

== Selected works ==
- A View of Victorian Literature (1922; reprinted 1978)
- On the Poetry of Pope (1938; 2nd ed. 1950)
- Essays in Criticism and Research (1942)
- English Poetry in the Nineteenth Century (1945)
- The Moral Poetry of Pope (1946)
- The Manner of Proceeding in Certain Eighteenth and Early Nineteenth Century Poems (1948)
- Poets, Scientists and Men: An Inter-Faculty Lecture Delivered on 7th December 1948 (1948)
- Criticism and the Nineteenth Century (1951)
- Thackeray the Novelist (1954)
- Pope and Human Nature (1958)
- Augustan Studies (1961)
- Augustan Poetic Diction (1964)
- Mid-Victorian Studies (1965) with Kathleen Tillotson
- Thackeray. The Critical Heritage (1968) editor with Donald Hawes
