= Henry Olsson =

Swedish literary scholar

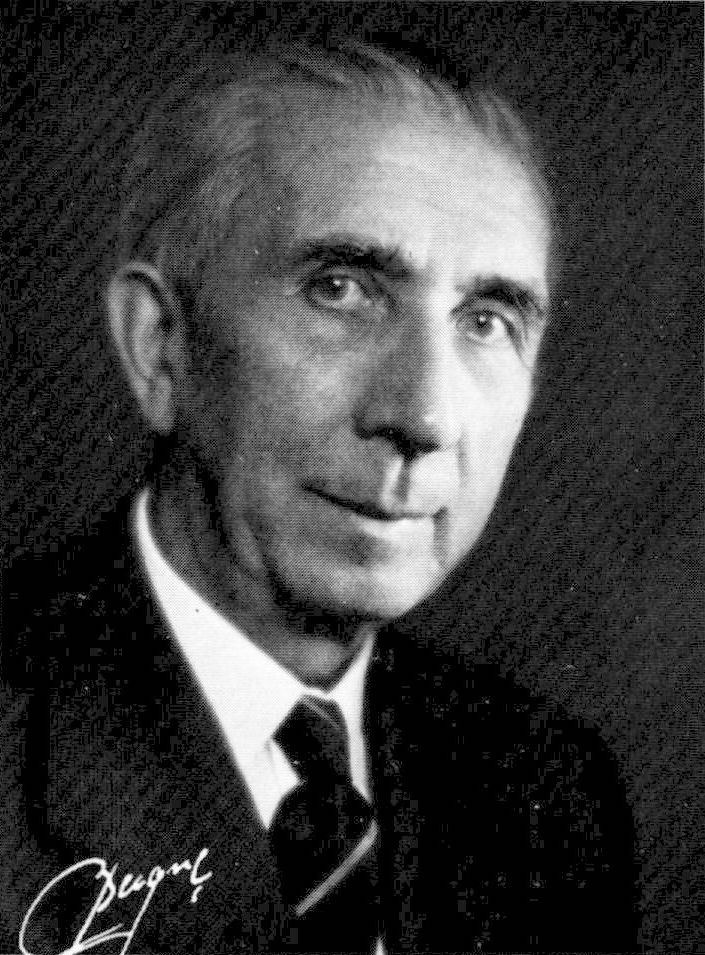
- Born: 18 April 1896; Köla, Sweden
- Died: 11 January 1985 (aged 88); Stockholm, Sweden

Academic background
- Education: Uppsala university

Academic work
- Discipline: literature
- Sub-discipline: literary history and poetics
- Institutions: Stockholm University
- Main interests: Swedish 19th-century poetry

Karl Henry Olsson (18 April 1896 – 11 January 1985) was a Swedish literary scholar. He was a professor of literary history and poetics at Stockholm University and a member of the Swedish Academy.

== Early life ==
Olsson was born in Köla parish, present-day Eda Municipality in the westernmost part of Värmland. After finishing his schooling in Karlstad he became a student at Uppsala university in 1914, and studied literature, especially poetry, for Henrik Schück, Martin Lamm, and Anton Blanck. He received a BA degree in 1918, a licentiate in 1921 and an MA in 1924.

== Career and scholarship ==
Olsson's writings and research focused on Swedish 19th-century poetry, including the poets Carl Jonas Love Almqvist, who was the topic of his doctoral dissertation at Stockholm University in 1927, Gustaf Fröding, and Carl Snoilsky. He was particularly interested in the literature of his home province, Värmland: Almqvist had lived a large part of his life in Köla, Olsson's birthplace, and Fröding was born in Värmland and wrote some of his poetry in the local dialect. In a book published by Olsson in the 1970s he recollected reading the news about Fröding's death in 1911, which had affected him strongly.

In 1936, Olsson applied for the position as Professor of literature at Lund University, and his two former teachers Lamm and Blanck both supported his application. The Danish scholar Poul V Rubow, however, strongly advised against Olsson receiving the appointment, and Olsson decided to withdraw his application. In 1945, he was elected to succeed Lamm as Professor of literary history and poetics at Stockholm university, a position he remained at until his retirement in 1961.

He was elected a member of the Swedish Academy in 1952 and was a member of the Nobel Committee for the literature prize between 1960 and 1971.

== Personal life ==
Olsson married Birgit Louise Ekelund from Fryksände in Värmland in 1926.

He died in Stockholm in 1985 and is buried at Skogskyrkogården.

Cultural offices
Preceded by Bengt Hesselman	Swedish Academy, Seat No.5; 1952–1985	Succeeded by Göran Malmqvist
