= Nirmal Kumar Sidhanta =

Indian scholar

Nirmal Kumar Sidhanta was a renowned Bengali Indian scholar of English literature, at the University of Lucknow and at the University of Calcutta.

He was educated at the renowned Scottish Church College in Calcutta, and at the University of Cambridge, from where he earned an MA degree. After starting out as a lecturer at the Scottish Church College, he moved on to be a professor of English and as dean of the faculty of Arts at the University of Lucknow. He would serve as the Vice Chancellor of the University of Calcutta from 15 May 1955 to 9 October 1960.

He was awarded the Padma Bhushan by the Government of India in 1959. He was also awarded an honorary Doctor of Literature by the University of Calcutta in 1961.

== Works ==
- The Heroic Age of India : A Comparative Study (London: Kegan Paul, 1929)
