= 1973 Nobel Prize in Literature =

- Patrick White
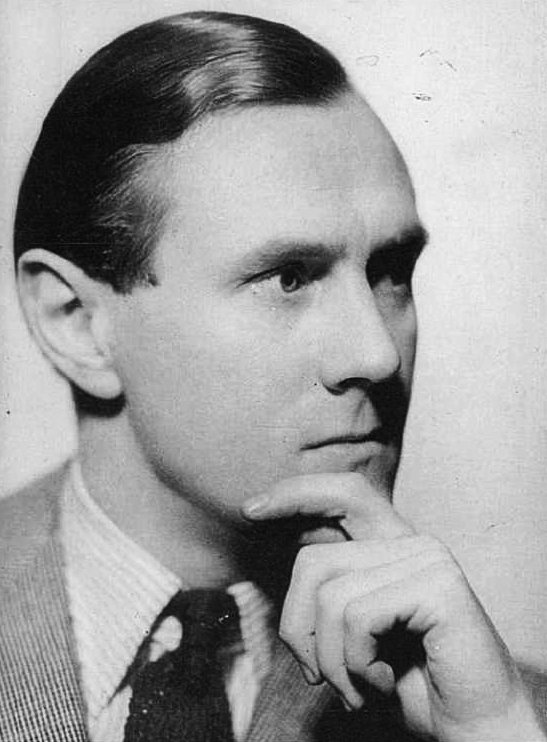
- "for an epic and psychological narrative art which has introduced a new continent into literature."
- Date: 18 October 1973 (announcement); 10 December 1973 (ceremony)
- Location: Stockholm, Sweden
- Presented by: Swedish Academy
- First award: 1901
- Website: Official website

The 1973 Nobel Prize in Literature was awarded to the Australian writer Patrick White (1912–1990) "for an epic and psychological narrative art which has introduced a new continent into literature." He is the first and the only Australian recipient of the prize.

== Laureate ==
The historical themes of Patrick White's novels and plays focus on his own Australia and its people. During his lifetime, he enjoyed greater acclaim abroad than he did at home, where his critical gaze was occasionally misunderstood. In 1939, he released Happy Valley, his debut novel. The Tree of Man (1955), a book about a farmer and his wife struggling to build a future in rural Australia, was his major literary success. Modern humanity's sense of loneliness and emptiness is a recurrent topic in his literary works. His other well-known works include The Vivisector (1970) and The Eye of the Storm (1973).

== Deliberations ==
=== Nominations ===
In total, the Nobel Committee collected 205 nominations for 101 writers for their deliberations – the second highest number of nominations revealed so far after 1969. White was first introduced for nomination in 1968 by Muriel Clara Bradbook, professor of English at Cambridge University. Henceforth, he became an annual nominee until he was subsequently awarded with the prize. In 1973, he was endorsed by academics and professors from Australia, New Zealand and Finland.

Eighteen authors were first-time nominees such as Vicente Aleixandre (awarded in 1977), Conrad Aiken, Miodrag Bulatović, Chiang Yee, Albert Cohen, Adolfo Costa du Rels, Eugen Jebeleanu, Yaşar Kemal, Zenta Mauriņa, Henry Miller, John Crowe Ransom, Isaac Bashevis Singer (awarded in 1978), Martin Wickramasinghe and Xu Xu. The highest number of nominations was for Jewish author Elie Wiesel (awarded the 1988 Nobel Peace Prize). The oldest nominee was Estonian poet Marie Under (aged 90) and the youngest was Finnish writer Hannu Salama (aged 37). Six of the nominees were women namely Simone de Beauvoir, Indira Devi Dhanrajgir, Nadine Gordimer (awarded in 1991), Doris Lessing (awarded in 2007), Zenta Mauriņa and Marie Under. The Indian novelist Tarasankar Bandyopadhyay, who died in 1971, was included posthumously by the Nobel Committee.

The authors Samuel Nathaniel Behrman, Arna Bontemps, Âşık Veysel, Kemal Tahir, Faruk Nafiz Çamlıbel, Noël Coward, John Creasey, Roland Dorgelès, Neil Miller Gunn, Egon Hostovský, Benn Levy, Warren Lewis, Lucy Beatrice Malleson (known as Anthony Gilbert), Nancy Mitford, Elma Napier, Robert C. O'Brien, Jirō Osaragi, Vera Panova, William Plomer, Brigitte Reimann, Sergio Tofano, Margaret Wilson and Nobuko Yoshiya died in 1973 without having been nominated for the prize while the American author Conrad Aiken died before the only chance to be awarded.

Official list of nominees and their nominators for the prize
No.	Nominee	Country	Genre(s)	Nominator(s)
1	Conrad Aiken (1889–1973)	United States	poetry, novel, short story, literary criticism, autobiography	Samuel Frederick Johnson (1918–2005)
2	Vicente Aleixandre (1898–1984)	Spain	poetry, essays	Dámaso Alonso (1898–1990)
3	Jorge Amado (1912–2001)	Brazil	novel, short story	Antônio Olinto (1919–2009)
4	Antonio Aniante (1900–1973)	Italy	drama, novel, essays	Vittorio Vettori (1920–2004)
5	Wystan Hugh Auden (1907–1973)	United Kingdom; United States	poetry, essays, screenplay	Pierre Bertaux (1907–1987); Hans Bielenstein (1920–2015); Alan Bullock (1914–2004); Henry Chadwick (1920–2008); Erik Frykman (1919–2010); Barbara Hardy (1924–2016); Samuel Frederick Johnson (1918–2005); Hans Mayer (1907–2001); Kauko Aatos Ojala (1919–1987); Allan Philip (1927–2004); Hugh M. Richmond (born 1932); Walter Weiss (1927–2004)
6	Riccardo Bacchelli (1891–1985)	Italy	novel, drama, essays	Giovanni Nencioni (1911–2008); Beniamino Segre (1903–1977)
7	Tarasankar Bandyopadhyay (1898–1971) (posthumous nomination)	India	novel, short story, drama, essays, autobiography, songwriting	Nobel Committee
8	Simone de Beauvoir (1908–1986)	France	novel, drama, memoir, philosophy, essays, short story	Walter Ralph Johnson (1933–2024)
9	Saul Bellow (1915–2005)	Canada; United States	novel, short story, memoir, essays	Roger Asselineau (1915–2002)
10	Louis Paul Boon (1912–1979)	Belgium	novel, essays, short story, poetry	Artur Lundkvist (1906–1991); Dirk de Jong (1910–1974); Paul Snoek (1933–1981); Theun de Vries (1907–2005)
11	Jorge Luis Borges (1899–1986)	Argentina	poetry, essays, translation, short story	Charles Dédéyan (1910–2003); Raimundo Lida (1908–1979); Miguel Alfredo Olivera (1912–2008)
12	Miodrag Bulatović (1930–1991)	Yugoslavia	novel, short story, drama, essays	Allan Philip (1927–2004)
13	Anthony Burgess (1917–1993)	United Kingdom	novel, poetry, drama, screenplay, autobiography, biography, essays, literary criticism, translation	Artur Lundkvist (1906–1991)
14	Michel Butor (1926–2016)	France	poetry, novel, essays, translation	Leon Samuel Roudiez (1917–2004)
15	Elias Canetti (1905–1994)	Bulgaria; United Kingdom	novel, drama, memoir, essays	Manfred Durzak (1938–); Keith Spalding (1913–2002); Dorothea Zeemann (1909–1993)
16	Camilo José Cela (1916–2002)	Spain	novel, short story, essay, poetry, drama, memoir	Marcel Bataillon (1895–1977); Alonso Zamora Vicente (1916–2016)
17	André Chamson (1900–1983)	France	novel, essays	Yannis Koutsocheras (1904–1994); Yves Gandon (1899–1975); Armand Lunel (1892–1977); Guy Nairay (1914–1999); Gunnar Tilander (1894–1973)
18	René Char (1907–1988)	France	poetry	Henri Peyre (1901–1988); Allan Philip (1927–2004)
19	Suniti Kumar Chatterji (1890–1977)	India	essays, pedagogy, literary criticism	Nobel Committee
20	Chiang Yee (1903–1977)	China	memoir, poetry, essays	Lo Hsiang-lin (1906–1978)
21	Sri Chinmoy (1931–2007)	India; United States	poetry, drama, short story, essays, songwriting	Joseph Axelrod (1910–1974); Karl Kroeber (1926–2009); Peter Pitzele (1942–)
22	Albert Cohen (1895–1981)	Switzerland	novel, drama, essays	Joseph Kessel (1898–1979)
23	Adolfo Costa du Rels (1891–1980)	Bolivia	novel, short story, drama, poetry, essays	Humberto Palza (1900–1975)
24	Fazıl Hüsnü Dağlarca (1914–2008)	Turkey	poetry	Yaşar Nabi Nayır (1908–1981)
25	Indira Devi Dhanrajgir (1930–2026)	India	poetry, essays	Krishna Srinivas (1913–2007)
26	Friedrich Dürrenmatt (1921–1990)	Switzerland	drama, novel, short story, essays	Werner Betz (1912–1980)
27	Odysseas Elytis (1911–1996)	Greece	poetry, essays, translation	Nobel Committee
28	Rabbe Enckell (1903–1974)	Finland	short story, poetry	Eeva Kilpi (1928–)
29	Salvador Espriu (1913–1985)	Spain	drama, novel, poetry	Antoni Comas i Pujol (1931–1981)
30	James Thomas Farrell (1904–1979)	United States	novel, short story, poetry	Duane Schneider (1937–2012)
31	José Maria Ferreira de Castro (1898–1978)	Portugal	novel	Antônio Olinto (1919–2009)
32	Max Frisch (1911–1991)	Switzerland	novel, drama	Wolfram Naumann (1921–2021)
33	Romain Gary (1914–1980)	Lithuania; France	novel, essays, literary criticism, screenplay	Walther Hinz (1906–1992)
34	William Golding (1911–1993)	United Kingdom	novel, poetry, drama, essays	Erik Frykman (1919–2010)
35	Nadine Gordimer (1923–2014)	South Africa	novel, short story, essay, drama	Artur Lundkvist (1906–1991)
36	Julien Gracq (1910–2007)	France	novel, drama, poetry, essays	Georges Matoré (1908–1998)
37	Günter Grass (1927–2015)	West Germany	novel, drama, poetry, essays	Manfred Windfuhr (1930–)
38	Robert Graves (1895–1985)	United Kingdom	history, novel, poetry, literary criticism, essays	Ellsworth Mason (1917–2013)
39	Julien Green (1900–1998)	France	novel, autobiography, essays	Johannes Edfelt (1904–1997); Jacques Petit (1928–1982); Lauri Seppänen (1924–2009); Edgar F. Shannon Jr. (1918–1997); Marcel Thiry (1897–1977)
40	Graham Greene (1904–1991)	United Kingdom	novel, short story, autobiography, essays	Heinrich Böll (1917–1985); Sylvère Monod (1921–2006); Herbert Morgan Waidson (1916–1988)
41	Jorge Guillén (1893–1984)	Spain	poetry, literary criticism	Kázmér Géza Werner (1900–1985)
42	Paavo Haavikko (1931–2008)	Finland	poetry, drama, essays	Eeva Kilpi (1928–)
43	William Heinesen (1900–1991)	Faroe Islands	poetry, short story, novel	Arthur Arnholtz (1901–1973); Ebba Haslund (1917–2009)
44	Vladimír Holan (1905–1980)	Czechoslovakia	poetry, essays	Nobel Committee
45	Taha Hussein (1889–1973)	Egypt	novel, short story, poetry, translation	Ibrāhīm Madkūr (1902–1995)
46	Gyula Illyés (1902–1983)	Hungary	poetry, novel, drama, essays	Iván Boldizsár (1912–1988); Artur Lundkvist (1906–1991); Andri Peer (1921–1985); G. Ganschow (–); László Vajda (1923–2010); Hans Fromm (1919–2008)
47	Eugen Jebeleanu (1911–1991)	Romania	poetry, essays, translation	Miron Nicolescu (1903–1975); Grigore Moisil (1906–1973); Alexandru A. Philippide (1900–1979); Corneliu Baba (1906–1997)
48	Eyvind Johnson (1900–1976)	Sweden	novel, short story	Johannes Edfelt (1904–1997); Pär Lagerkvist (1891–1974)
49	Ferenc Juhász (1928–2015)	Hungary	poetry	Artur Lundkvist (1906–1991)
50	Yaşar Kemal (1923–2015)	Turkey	novel, essays	Dag Strömbäck (1900–1978); Per Wästberg (1933–)
51	Erich Kästner (1899–1974)	West Germany	poetry, screenplay, autobiography	Hermann Kesten (1900–1996)
52	Miroslav Krleža (1893–1981)	Croatia; Yugoslavia	poetry, drama, short story, novel, essays	Nobel Committee
53	Manbohdan Lal (–)	India		Nobel Committee
54	Frank Raymond Leavis (1895–1978)	United Kingdom	literary criticism, essays	Mary Renault (1905–1983)
55	Doris Lessing (1919–2013)	United Kingdom	novel, short story, memoirs, drama, poetry, essays	Artur Lundkvist (1906–1991)
56	Lin Yutang (1895–1976)	China	novel, philosophy, essays, translation	José María Acosta Acosta (–)
57	Väinö Linna (1920–1992)	Finland	novel	Eeva Kilpi (1928–)
58	Robert Lowell (1917–1977)	United States	poetry, translation	Hans Galinsky (1909–1991)
59	Salvador de Madariaga (1886–1978)	Spain	essays, history, law, novel	Julián Gorkin (1901–1987)
60	Norman Mailer (1923–2007)	United States	novel, short story, poetry, essays, biography, drama, screenplay	Artur Lundkvist (1906–1991); Lars Huldén (1926–2016)
61	Bernard Malamud (1914–1986)	United States	novel, short story	Nobel Committee
62	André Malraux (1901–1976)	France	novel, essays, literary criticism	Henning Fenger (1921–1985); Maurice Genevoix (1890–1980); Jan Kott (1914–2001); Maija Lehtonen (1924–2015); Henri Peyre (1901–1988); John Henry Raleigh (1920–2001); Carl Stief (1914–1998); Laurent Versini (1932–2021)
63	Frederick Manfred (1912–1994)	United States	novel, essays	Robert G. Athearn (1914-1983); Joseph M. Flora (1934–); Wayne Knutson (1926–2015); Robert W. Lewis (1930–2013)
64	Gustave Lucien Martin-Saint-René (1888–1973)	France	poetry, novel, essays, literary criticism, drama, songwriting, short story	Henri Guiter (1909–1994)
65	Harry Martinson (1904–1978)	Sweden	poetry, novel, drama, essays	Johannes Edfelt (1904–1997); Artur Lundkvist (1906–1991); Arthur Arnholtz (1901–1973)
66	Zenta Mauriņa (1897–1978)	Latvia	short story, autobiography, essays, translation, philology	Mārtiņš Zīverts (1903–1990)
67	László Mécs (1895–1978)	Hungary	poetry, essays	József Fülöp (1927–1994); Károly Wojatsek (1916–2008); Anthony Etele (1911–2010); Nándor Dreisziger (1940–); Bennett Kovrig (1940–); Leslie Duska (1912–); János Miska (1932–2022); Alexander Kristóf (–); Pál Nyiregyházy (–); András László (1919–1988); Watson Kirkconnell (1895–1977); Bela Talbot Kardos (–); György Nagy (1939–2023)
68	Veijo Meri (1928–2015)	Finland	novel, short story, poetry, essays	Nobel Committee
69	Henri Michaux (1899–1984)	Belgium; France	poetry, essays	Lars Forssell (1928–2007)
70	Arthur Miller (1915–2005)	United States	drama, screenplay, essays	Andri Peer (1921–1985)
71	Henry Miller (1891–1980)	United States	novel, short story, memoir, essays	Allan Philip (1927–2004)
72	Vilhelm Moberg (1898–1973)	Sweden	novel, drama, history	Gunnar Tilander (1894–1973)
73	Eugenio Montale (1896–1981)	Italy	poetry, translation	Uberto Limentani (1913–1989); Andri Peer (1921–1985); Luciano Rebay (1928–2014)
74	Alberto Moravia (1907–1990)	Italy	novel, literary criticism, essays, drama	Jacques Robichez (1914–1999)
75	Vladimir Nabokov (1899–1977)	Russia; United States	novel, short story, poetry, drama, translation, literary criticism, memoir	Samuel Frederick Johnson (1918–2005); Antun Šoljan (1932–1993); Aleksandr Solzhenitsyn (1918–2008); Ernest Tuveson (1915–1996); Bernard Tervoort (1920–2006)
76	V. S. Naipaul (1932–2018)	Trinidad and Tobago; United Kingdom	novel, short story, essays	Artur Lundkvist (1906–1991)
77	José María Pemán (1897–1981)	Spain	poetry, drama, novel, essays, screenplay	Manuel Halcón (1900–1989)
78	Zayn al-ʻĀbidīn Rahnamā (1894–1990)	Iran	history, essays, translation	Manouchehr Eghbal (1909–1977)
79	John Crowe Ransom (1888–1974)	United States	poetry, essays, literary criticism	Samuel Frederick Johnson (1918–2005)
80	Evaristo Ribera Chevremont (1890–1976)	Puerto Rico	poetry	Ernesto Juan Fonfrías (1909–1990)
81	Yannis Ritsos (1909–1990)	Greece	poetry, songwriting	Nobel Committee
82	Tadeusz Rózewicz (1921–2014)	Poland	poetry, drama, translation	Józef Trypućko (1910–1983)
83	Hans Ruin (1891–1980)	Finland; Sweden	philosophy	Arthur Arnholtz (1901–1973)
84	Hannu Salama (born 1936)	Finland	novel, short story, poetry	Magnus von Platen (1920–2020)
85	Léopold Sédar Senghor (1906–2001)	Senegal	poetry, essays	Roger Asselineau (1915–2002)
86	Claude Simon (1913–2005)	France	novel, essays	Artur Lundkvist (1906–1991); Haydn Trevor Mason (1929–2018)
87	Isaac Bashevis Singer (1902–1991)	Poland; United States	novel, short story, autobiography, essays	Moshe Starkman (1906–1975)
88	Zaharia Stancu (1902–1974)	Romania	poetry, novel, philosophy, essays	Miguel Ángel Asturias (1899–1974); Alf Lombard (1902–1996); Andri Peer (1921–1985); Virgil Teodorescu (1909–1987)
89	Pratap Narayan Tandon (1935–)	India	novel, essays	Brij Behari Nayak (–)
90	Marie Under (1883–1980)	Estonia	poetry	Algirdas Landsbergis (1924–2004); Ants Oras (1900–1982)
91	José García Villa (1908–1997)	Philippines; United States	poetry, essays	Purita Kalaw Ledesma (1914–2005)
92	Paul Voivenel (1880–1975)	France	memoir, essays	Roland Dorgelès (1885–1973)
93	Gerard Walschap (1898–1989)	Belgium	novel, drama, essays	Maurice Gilliams (1900–1982); Willem Pée (1903–1986)
94	Sándor Weöres (1913–1989)	Hungary	poetry, translation	Áron Kibédi Varga (1930–2018)
95	Patrick White (1912–1990)	Australia	novel, short story, drama, poetry, autobiography	Neva Clarke McKenna (1920–2015); Artur Lundkvist (1906–1991); Leslie Rees (1905–2000); Bertha Anne Johnstone (1895–1984); Tauno Frans Mustanoja (1912–1996); Dora Somerville (1886–1976)
96	Martin Wickramasinghe (1890–1976)	Sri Lanka	novel, short story, drama, literary criticism, essays, philosophy, autobiography, biography, history	Ediriweera Sarachchandra (1914–1996)
97	Elie Wiesel (1928–2016)	Romania; United States	memoir, essays, novel, drama	Robert Alter (1935–); Marver Bernstein (1919–1990); Albert H. Bowker (1919–2008); Jules Brody (1928–2021); Harry J. Cargas (1932–1998); Gerson D. Cohen (1924–1991); David Daiches (1912–2005); Louis Finkelstein (1895–1991); Maurice Stanley Friedman (1921–2012); Victor Gourevitch (1925–2020); Irving Greenberg (1933–); Irving Halperin (1922–2000); Philip Handler (1917–1981); James McNaughton Hester (1924–2014); Gerd Høst-Heyerdahl (1915–2007); Lothar Kahn (1922–1990); Louis L. Kaplan (1902–2001); Jack Kolbert (1927–2005); Joshua Lederberg (1925–2008); André Michel Lwoff (1902–1994); Gabriel Marcel (1889–1973); Robert Marshak (1916–1992); David Patterson (1922–2005); Michael Riffaterre (1924–2006); Laurits Saltveit (1913–1999); Frederick Seitz (1911–2008); John Silber (1926–2012); Pierre-Henri Simon (1903–1972); Saul Touster (1925–2018); Melvin Yoken (1939–); Charles E. Young (1931–2023); Meyer Weisgal (1894–1977)
98	Thornton Wilder (1897–1975)	United States	drama, novel, short story	Wolfgang Clemen (1909–1990)
99	Xu Xu (1908–1980)	China; Hong Kong	novel, poetry, drama, essays, literary criticism	Lee Chiu-seng (–)
100	Amado Yuzon (1906–1979)	Philippines	poetry, essays	Emeterio Barcelon Barcelo-Soriano (1897-1978)
101	Carl Zuckmayer (1896–1977)	West Germany	drama, screenplay	Erich Ruprecht (1965–1972)

=== Prize Decision ===
In June 1973, Nobel Committee chair, Karl Ragnar Gierow, expressed that setting the shortlist "the committee agreed on Patrick White, Saul Bellow also had five votes, Yiannis Ritsos got four, Anthony Burgess, William Golding and Eugenio Montale each got three." Gierow himself listed Ritsos as his first proposal, followed by White and Bellow, but noted that the committee awaited further external opinions on the Greek poet. Gierow said that Patrick White appeared to have the strongest support in the committee, thoroughly deliberated and a final contender in recent years, but noted that White's most recent novel The Vivisector was not as strong as his previous work which possibly would be a reason for the committee to await further works before awarding him, and noted that Bellow at this point appeared as the stronger candidate. While saying Montale could be regarded as a worthy recipient of the prize, Gierow was not ready to recommend him, neither did he want to recommend Burgess or Golding, although saying both would be acceptable. In his report, Gierow also noted the candidacy of Isaac Bashevis Singer (subsequently awarded in 1978), but that Singer's work yet needed to be investigated by the committee.

In an additional report dated 5 September 1973, Gierow wrote that he had found Bellow's candidacy strengthened and White's candidacy weakened due to latters newly published novel The Eye of the Storm, which Gierow found even weaker than The Vivisector. Gierow now listed Bellow as his first proposal followed by Montale, Burgess, Golding and White. Yiannis Ritsos candidacy was postponed by the committee as they were still awaiting external reports on his work.

On their meeting on 6 September 1973 the committee settled on a final shortlist with Patrick White as their first proposal, Bellow as the second proposal, Montale as the third and Burgess as the fourth proposal.

== Award ceremony speech ==
At the award ceremony in Stockholm on 10 December 1973, Artur Lundkvist of the Swedish Academy said:

Patrick White’s literary art has spread his fame throughout the world and he now ranks as Australia’s foremost representative in his field. His creative work, performed in solitude and doubtless in the teeth of considerable opposition, in various kinds of adversity, has gradually yielded lasting and progressively more widely acknowledged results, in spite of the doubts he himself may have had concerning the value of his efforts. The controversial side of Patrick White is connected with the extreme tension of his self-expression, with his assault on the most difficult problems: the very qualities that constitute his indisputable greatness. Without those qualities he would be unable to bestow the consolation now present in the very midst of his gloom: the conviction that there must be something more worth living for than our onward rushing civilization seems to offer.

Patrick White did not travel to Stockholm to attend the award ceremony. His Nobel prize was received by his friend, the Australian artist Sidney Nolan.
