= Geno Pampaloni =

Italian literary critic, journalist and editor (1918–2001)

- Born: 25 November 1918; Rome, Kingdom of Italy
- Died: 17 January 2001 (aged 82); Bagno a Ripoli, Tuscany, Italy
- Occupations: Literary critic, journalist, editor, essayist
- Spouse: Argia Colombini
- Children: 4

Geno Pampaloni (25 November 1918 – 17 January 2001) was an Italian literary critic, journalist, editor, and essayist. He was among the leading Italian literary critics of the postwar period, writing extensively on 20th-century Italian literature while also working as an editor, publisher, and cultural administrator. He collaborated with major newspapers and literary journals including Il Ponte, Belfagor, L'Espresso, Corriere della Sera, Il Giornale, and La Voce.

== Life and career ==
Pampaloni was born in Rome on 25 November 1918, the only child of Agenore Pampaloni, a native of Colle di Val d'Elsa, and Assunta Guerri, a primary-school teacher from Anghiari. He spent his early childhood between Rome and Orbetello before the family settled in Grosseto in 1924.

He attended the "Carducci-Ricasoli" classical lyceum, graduating in 1937. There he formed a lifelong friendship with Gianfranco Folena and was taught by Giuseppe Isnardi and the Dante scholar Salvatore Frascino, both of whom strongly influenced his literary education. During his school years he began writing poetry, contributed reports to the local Fascist Institute of Culture, and published his first newspaper articles in Il Telegrafo. In 1938, together with his friend Antonio Meocci, Pampaloni co-founded the literary and arts magazine Ansedonia, initially based in Grosseto before relocating to Rome in 1940. The journal published contributions by writers including Giorgio Caproni, Libero Bigiaretti, and Renzo Laurano.

He studied literature at the University of Florence under Attilio Momigliano, Giacomo Devoto, and Bruno Migliorini before transferring to the Scuola Normale Superiore in Pisa after the implementation of the 1938 Italian racial laws, following the dismissal of Momigliano. He graduated in 1943. During the World War II he served as an officer in the Italian Army, taking part in the Italian campaign after 1943, including the battle of Monte Marrone. After the war he worked as a journalist for Italia Libera, the newspaper of the Action Party, and taught in Borgosesia. In 1946 he married Argia Colombini.

In 1948 Pampaloni joined Olivetti at Ivrea at the invitation of Adriano Olivetti, directing the company's library and later coordinating its cultural services. He also served as secretary-general of the Community Movement and contributed to the journal Comunità.

From the 1950s onward he became one of Italy's best-known literary critics. He wrote for numerous journals and newspapers, reviewing major contemporary authors including Corrado Alvaro, Ignazio Silone, Cesare Pavese, Elio Vittorini, Giorgio Bassani, Alberto Moravia, Carlo Emilio Gadda, Pier Paolo Pasolini, Andrea Zanzotto, and Primo Levi. Although primarily associated with narrative criticism, he also wrote extensively on modern Italian poetry. He directed the publishing house Vallecchi from 1962 until 1972, later founded and directed EDIPEM, part of the De Agostini publishing group, and briefly served as director of the Gabinetto Vieusseux in Florence in 1984–85. He edited critical editions of works by authors including Giacomo Noventa, Marino Moretti, Alessandro Manzoni, Niccolò Tommaseo, and Luigi Capuana.

He remained active as a reviewer and essayist until the end of his life, especially through his long collaboration with Il Giornale and later La Voce.

Pampaloni died on 17 January 2001 at Ponte a Niccheri Hospital in Bagno a Ripoli, near Florence.

== Books (selection) ==
- Adriano Olivetti: un'idea di democrazia (1980)
- Trent'anni con Cesare Pavese. Diario contro diario (1981)
- Buono come il pane e altre memorie di giovinezza (1983)
- Fedele alle amicizie (1984; expanded ed. 1992)
- Bonus malus (1994)
- I giorni in fuga (1994)
- La nuova ruralità (1988)
- Sul ponte tra Novecento e Duemila (edited by Vittorio Vettori, 1998)

== Sources ==
- Biondi, Marino (2000). Fedele alla critica (in Italian). Florence: Polistampa.
- Biscardi, Anna Maria (1996). Colloqui amichevoli con Geno Pampaloni (in Italian). Florence: Polistampa.
- Scalessa, Gabriele (2014). "PAMPALONI, Geno". Dizionario Biografico degli Italiani (in Italian). Vol. 80. Rome: Istituto della Enciclopedia Italiana.
- Zorzi, Renzo (1991). "Geno Pampaloni, la critica come servizio". Gli anni dell'amicizia (in Italian). Vicenza: Neri Pozza.
