= 1966 Nobel Prize in Literature =

- Shmuel Yosef Agnon and Nelly Sachs
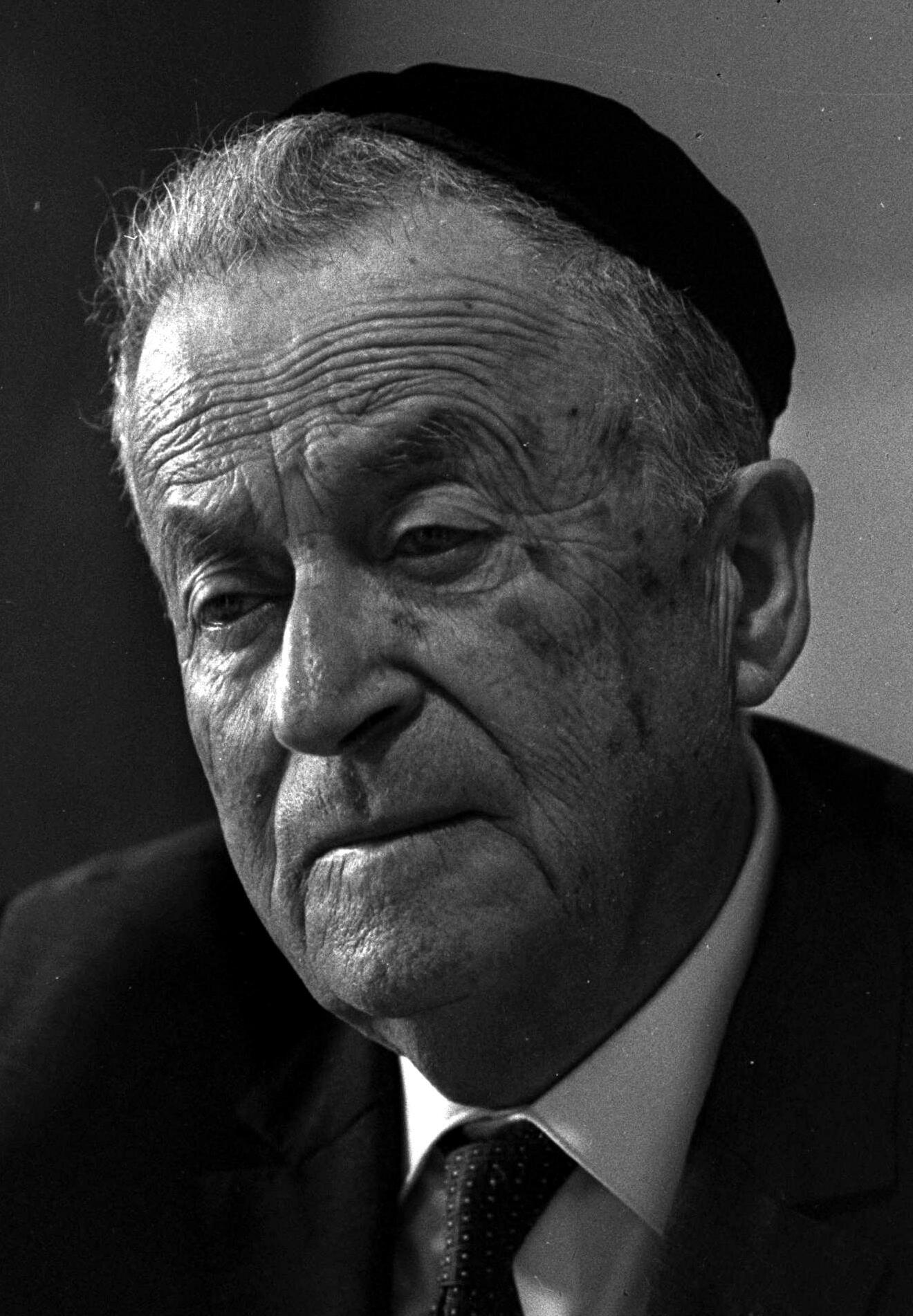
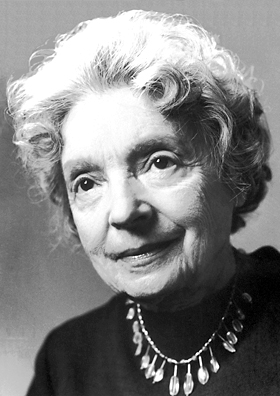
- Agnon "for his profoundly characteristic narrative art with motifs from the life of the Jewish people," and Sachs "for her outstanding lyrical and dramatic writing, which interprets Israel's destiny with touching strength."
- Date: 20 October 1966 (announcement); 10 December 1966 (ceremony)
- Location: Stockholm, Sweden
- Presented by: Swedish Academy
- First award: 1901
- Website: Official website

The 1966 Nobel Prize in Literature was divided equally between Shmuel Yosef Agnon (1887–1970) "for his profoundly characteristic narrative art with motifs from the life of the Jewish people" and Nelly Sachs (1891–1970) "for her outstanding lyrical and dramatic writing, which interprets Israel's destiny with touching strength."

It is one of four occasions (the others being 1904, 1917, and 1974) when the Nobel Prize in Literature has been shared between two individuals.

== Laureates ==
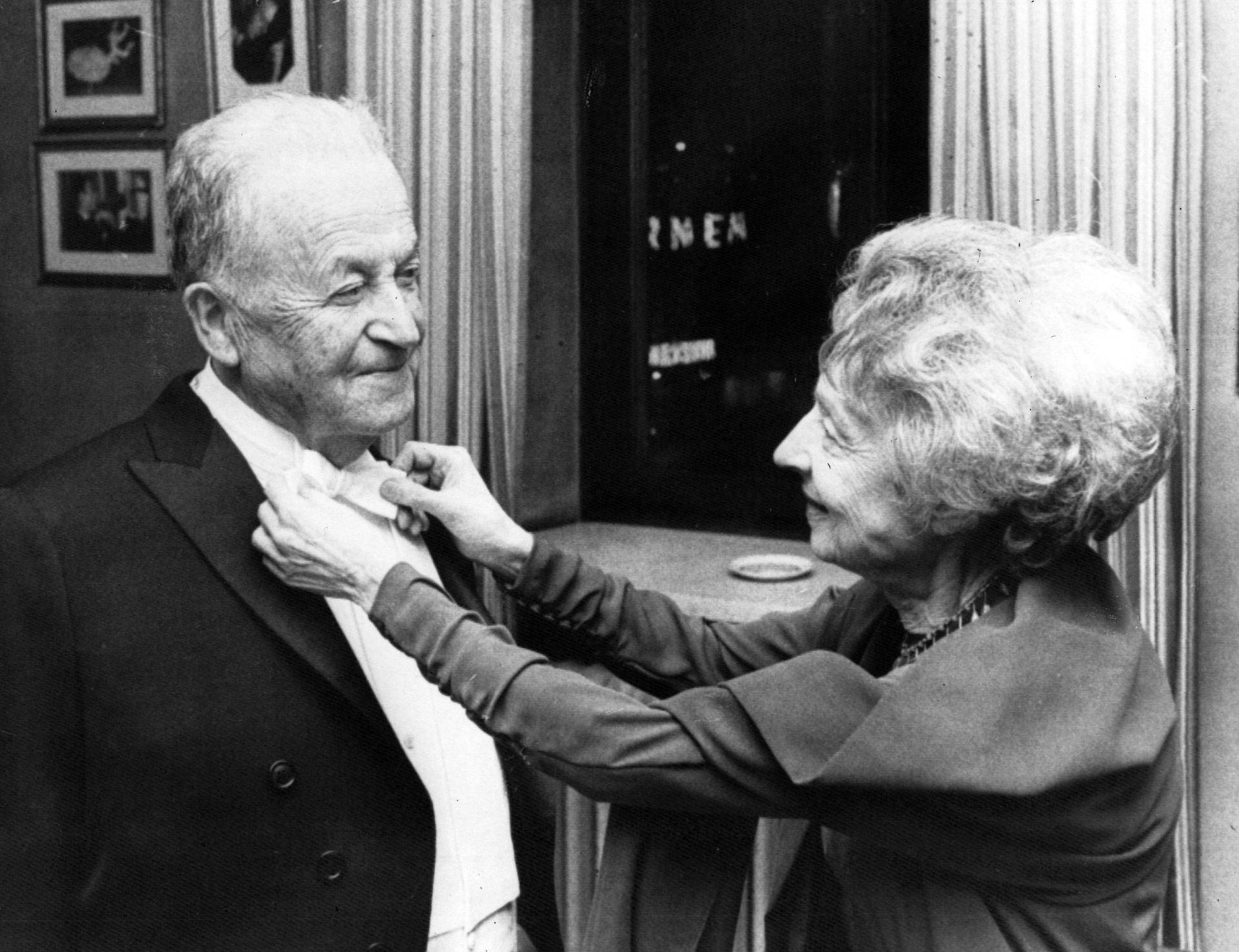
Nobel laureates Nelly Sachs and Samuel Agnon preparing for the festivities in Stockholm on 10 December 1966.

=== Shmuel Yosef Agnon ===
Shmuel Agnon was one of the central figures of modern Hebrew literature. His works deal with the conflict of Jewish tradition and language and the modern world. His first works were published when he was a teenager and he immediately gained a reputation. His breakthrough novel was Hakhnāsat kallāh ("The Bridal Cannopy", 1931). After World War II, under the impact of the holocaust, Agnon wrote Ir Umeloah ("A City in its Fullness", 1973), which is a collection of folktales, legends, and chronicles portraying his birth town, Buczacz.

=== Nelly Sachs ===
Nelly Sachs was a German poet and dramatist whose works deal with the dark fate of the Jewish people in the 20th century. She borrows subjects for her poetry from the Jewish beliefs and mysticism, but her authorship is also strongly colored by Nazi persecution of the Jews, with the horrors of the death camps as its ultimate expression. Sachs' poetry combines echoes from the poetry of ancient religious texts with modernist language. Besides poetry, her writings also include a couple of plays. Her best-known collections include In den Wohnungen des Todes ("In the Houses of Death", 1947), Sternverdunkelung ("Eclipse of Stars", 1949), and Flucht und Verwandlung ("Flight and Metamorphosis", 1959).

== Deliberations ==
=== Nominations ===
In 1966, the Nobel committee for literature received 99 nominations for 72 writers including Jean Anouilh, Louis Aragon, W. H. Auden, Samuel Beckett (awarded in 1969), Jorge Luis Borges, Heinrich Böll (awarded in 1972), Alejo Carpentier, René Char, Lawrence Durrell, E. M. Forster, Max Frisch, Robert Graves, Graham Greene, Jorge Guillén, Yasunari Kawabata (awarded in 1968), André Malraux, Harry Martinson (awarded in 1974), Alberto Moravia, Vladimir Nabokov, Pablo Neruda (awarded in 1971), Ezra Pound, Mika Waltari, Tarjei Vesaas and Simon Vestdijk. Ten of the nominees were nominated first-time, among them Pierre-Henri Simon, Witold Gombrowicz, Arnold Wesker, Carlo Emilio Gadda and Günter Grass (awarded in 1999). Three of the nominees were women: Anna Achmatova, Katherine Anne Porter and Nelly Sachs.

The authors Margery Allingham, Hans Christian Branner, Dimitar Dimov, Helga Eng, Svend Fleuron, C. S. Forester, Jean Galtier-Boissière, Mina Loy, Lao She, Kathleen Norris, Frank O'Connor, Frank O'Hara, Brian O'Nolan, Delmore Schwartz, Cordwainer Smith, Daisetsu Teitaro Suzuki,Caterina Albert(Victor catala),Henry Treece, and Marja-Liisa Vartio died in 1966 without having been nominated for the prize. Soviet-Russian poet Anna Akhmatova died months before the announcement.

Official list of nominees and their nominators for the prize
No.	Nominee	Country	Genre(s)	Nominator(s)
1	Anna Akhmatova (1889–1966)	Soviet Union	poetry	Roman Jakobson (1896–1982); Gunnar Jacobsson (1918–2001); Karl Ragnar Gierow (1904–1982)
2	Shmuel Yosef Agnon (1887–1970)	Israel	novel, short story	Eyvind Johnson (1900–1976)
3	Jean Anouilh (1910–1987)	France	drama, screenplay, translation	Paul Pédech (1912–2005); Viktor Pöschl (1910–1997)
4	Louis Aragon (1897–1982)	France	novel, short story, poetry, essays	Robert Ricatte (1913–1995)
5	Alexandre Arnoux (1884–1973)	France	screenplay, novel	François Bar (1907–1984)
6	Miguel Ángel Asturias (1899–1974)	Guatemala	novel, short story, poetry, essays, drama	Charles Vincent Aubrun (1906–1993)
7	Wystan Hugh Auden (1907–1973)	United Kingdom; United States	poetry, essays, screenplay	Andrew Chiappe (1915–1967); Lionel Trilling (1905–1975); Jack Arthur Walter Bennett (1911–1981)
8	Samuel Beckett (1906–1989)	Ireland	novel, drama, poetry	William York Tindall (1903–1981); William Stuart Maguinness (1903–1983); Léon Cellier (1911–1976); Johannes Edfelt (1904–1997)
9	Johan Borgen (1902–1979)	Norway	novel, literary criticism	Harry Martinson (1904–1978)
10	Jorge Luis Borges (1899–1986)	Argentina	poetry, essays, translation, short story	Paul Bénichou (1908–2001); Eugenio Florit (1903–1999)
11	Henri Bosco (1888–1976)	France	novel, short story	Louis Guinet (1911–1993)
12	Heinrich Böll (1917–1985)	West Germany	novel, short story	René Wellek (1903–1995)
13	Alejo Carpentier (1904–1980)	Cuba	novel, short story, essays	Henri Peyre (1901–1988)
14	René Char (1907–1988)	France	poetry	Georges Blin (1917–2015)
15	Lawrence Durrell (1912–1990)	United Kingdom	novel, short story, poetry, drama, essays	Henry Olsson (1896–1985)
16	Pierre Emmanuel (1916–1984)	France	poetry, autobiography	Jacqueline Duchemin (1910–1988)
17	Edward Morgan Forster (1879–1970)	United Kingdom	novel, short story, drama, essays, biography, literary criticism	Horace Leland Friess (1900–1975); John Herman Randall Jr. (1899–1980)
18	Max Frisch (1911–1991)	Switzerland	novel, drama	John Stephenson Spink (1909–1985); Hans Robert Jauss (1921–1997)
19	Carlo Emilio Gadda (1893–1973)	Italy	novel, short story, poetry	Mario Pei (1901–1978)
20	Rómulo Gallegos (1884–1969)	Venezuela	novel, short story	Andrés Iduarte Foucher (1907–1984)
21	Hossein Ghods-Nakhai (1911–1977)	Iran	poetry, essays	Arthur John Arberry (1905–1969)
22	Jean Giono (1895–1970)	France	novel, short story, essays, poetry, drama	Jean-Jacques Leveque (1931–2012)
23	Witold Gombrowicz (1904–1969)	Poland	short story, novel, drama	Gunnar Jacobsson (1918–2001)
24	Günter Grass (1927–2015)	West Germany	novel, drama, poetry, essays	Erwin Wolff (1924–2007)
25	Robert Graves (1895–1985)	United Kingdom	history, novel, poetry, literary criticism, essays	The English PEN-Club; Marvin Spevack (1927–2013)
26	Graham Greene (1904–1991)	United Kingdom	novel, short story, autobiography, essays	Kristian Smidt (1916–2013)
27	Jorge Guillén (1893–1984)	Spain	poetry, literary criticism	Henri Peyre (1901–1988)
28	Leslie Poles Hartley (1895–1972)	United Kingdom	novel, short story, essays	Geoffrey Tillotson (1905–1969)
29	Gyula Illyés (1902–1983)	Hungary	poetry, novel, drama, essays	János Lotz (1913–1973)
30	Jarosław Iwaszkiewicz (1894–1980)	Poland	poetry, essays, drama, translation, short story, novel	Jean Fabre (1904–1975)
31	Marcel Jouhandeau (1888–1979)	France	short story, novel	Jean Gaulmier (1905–1997)
32	Ernst Jünger (1895–1998)	West Germany	philosophy, novel, memoir	Rudolf Till (1911–1979)
33	Yasunari Kawabata (1899–1972)	Japan	novel, short story	Karl Ragnar Gierow (1904–1982)
34	Miroslav Krleža (1893–1981)	Yugoslavia	poetry, drama, short story, novel, essays	Gunnar Jacobsson (1918–2001)
35	Erich Kästner (1899–1974)	West Germany	poetry, screenplay, autobiography	Werner Betz (1912–1980)
36	Carlo Levi (1902–1975)	Italy	memoir, novel, short story	Maria Bellonci (1902–1986)
37	Robert Lowell (1917–1977)	United States	poetry, translation	Eric Bentley (1916–2020)
38	André Malraux (1901–1976)	France	novel, essays, literary criticism	Henry Caraway Hatfield (1912–1995); John Martin Cocking (1914–1986); Yves Le Hir (1919–2005); Georges Matoré (1908–1998)
39	Harry Martinson (1904–1978)	Sweden	poetry, novel, drama, essays	Alf Önnerfors (1925–2019)
40	Thierry Maulnier (1909–1988)	France	drama, essays, literary criticism	Félix Carrère (1911–1991)
41	Ramón Menéndez Pidal (1869–1968)	Spain	philology, history	Gunnar Tilander (1894–1973); Henri Guiter (1909–1994)
42	Vilhelm Moberg (1898–1973)	Sweden	novel, drama, history	Gösta Bergman (1894–1984)
43	Eugenio Montale (1896–1981)	Italy	poetry, translation	Uberto Limentani (1913–1989)
44	Henry de Montherlant (1895–1972)	France	essays, novel, drama	Barthélémy-Antonin Taladoire (1907–1976)
45	Alberto Moravia (1907–1990)	Italy	novel, literary criticism, essays, drama	Uberto Limentani (1913–1989); Maria Bellonci (1902–1986)
46	Henri Muller (1902–1980)	France	novel, memoir, essays	Pierre Lyautey (1893–1976)
47	Vladimir Nabokov (1899–1977)	Russia; United States	novel, short story, poetry, drama, translation, literary criticism, memoir	Jacques Guicharnaud (1924–2005)
48	Pablo Neruda (1904–1973)	Chile	poetry	Lennart Breitholtz (1909–1998); Jürgen von Stackelberg (1925–2020); The Chilean Writers Society; Juan Marichal (1922–2010)
49	Junzaburō Nishiwaki (1894–1982)	Japan	poetry, literary criticism	Naoshirō Tsuji (1899–1979)
50	Walter Pabst (1907–1992)	West Germany	essays, literary criticism	Günther Reichenkron (1907–1966)
51	Marcel Pagnol (1895–1974)	France	novel, memoir, drama, screenplay	Jean François-Anatole Ricci (–)
52	Konstantin Paustovsky (1892–1968)	Soviet Union	novel, poetry, drama	Karl Ragnar Gierow (1904–1982)
53	José María Pemán (1897–1981)	Spain	poetry, drama, novel, essays, screenplay	members of the Royal Spanish Academy; Manuel Halcón Villalón-Daoíz (1900–1989); Gerardo Diego (1896–1987)
54	Katherine Anne Porter (1890–1980)	United States	short story, essays	Cleanth Brooks (1906–1994)
55	Ezra Pound (1885–1972)	United States	poetry, essays	Norman Holmes Pearson (1909–1975); Heinrich Matthias Heinrichs (1911–1983)
56	John Boynton Priestley (1894–1984)	United Kingdom	novel, drama, screenplay, literary criticism, essays	Archibald Tucker (1904–1980)
57	Jules Romains (1885–1972)	France	poetry, drama, screenplay	Yves Gandon (1899–1975)
58	Nelly Sachs (1891–1970)	West Germany; Sweden	poetry, drama	Walter Arthur Berendsohn (1884–1984); Siegbert Salomon Prawer (1925–2012); Henry Olsson (1896–1985)
59	Paul Celan (1920–1970)	Romania; France	poetry, translation	Henry Olsson (1896–1985)
60	Pierre-Henri Simon (1903–1972)	France	essays, novel, literary criticism, poetry	Pierre Jonin (1912–1997)
61	Gustave Thibon (1903–2001)	France	philosophy	Édouard Delebecque (1910–1990)
62	Miguel Torga (1907–1995)	Portugal	poetry, short story, novel, drama, autobiography	Jean-Baptiste Aquarone (1903–1989)
63	Pietro Ubaldi (1886–1972)	Italy	philosophy, essays	Academia Santista de Letras
64	Mika Waltari (1908–1979)	Finland	short story, novel, poetry, drama, essays, screenplay	Manfred Mayrhofer (1926–2011)
65	Tarjei Vesaas (1897–1970)	Norway	poetry, novel	Carl-Eric Thors (1920–1986); Sigmund Skard (1903–1995); Norwegian Authors' Union
66	Arnold Wesker (1932–2016)	United Kingdom	drama, novel, essays	Alistair Campbell (1907–1974)
67	Simon Vestdijk (1898–1971)	Netherlands	novel, poetry, essays, translation	The Dutch PEN-Club; Dutch Association of Writers and Translators; Royal Netherlands Academy of Arts and Sciences
68	Thornton Wilder (1897–1975)	United States	drama, novel, short story	Morton Wilfred Bloomfield (1913–1987)
69	Edmund Wilson (1895–1972)	United States	essays, literary criticism, short story, drama	Leon Samuel Roudiez (1917–2004)
70	Arnold Zweig (1887–1968)	East Germany	novel, short story	Heinz Mettke (1924–2007)
71	Arnulf Øverland (1889–1968)	Norway	poetry, essays	Eyvind Johnson (1900–1976)
72	Alberto Hidalgo Lobato (1897–1967)	Peru	poetry, essays	Peruvian Writers Association

=== Prize decision ===
The Nobel committee, a working group within the Swedish Academy, proposed that the 1966 Nobel Prize in Literature should be awarded to the Japanese writer Yasunari Kawabata, but, unconventionally, the 18 members of the Academy did not follow the recommendation and voted for a prize to Agnon and Sachs. A shared prize to the Latin American writers Jorge Luis Borges and Miguel Angel Asturias, and to Nelly Sachs and Paul Celan were proposed.

== Award ceremony ==
In his award ceremony speech on 10 December 1966 Anders Österling of the Swedish Academy said:

This year’s Nobel Prize in Literature has been awarded to two outstanding Jewish authors – Shmuel Yosef Agnon and Nelly Sachs – each of whom represents Israel’s message to our time. Agnon’s home is in Jerusalem, and Miss Sachs has been an immigrant in Sweden since 1940, and is now a Swedish subject. The purpose of combining these two prizewinners is to do justice to the individual achievements of each, and the sharing of the prize has its special justification: to honour two writers who, although they write in different languages, are united in a spiritual kinship and complement each other in a superb effort to present the cultural heritage of the Jewish people through the written word. Their common source of inspiration has been, for both of them, a vital power.
