= Indira Devi Dhanrajgir =

Indian poet (1930–2026)

Rajkumari Indira Devi Dhanrajgir
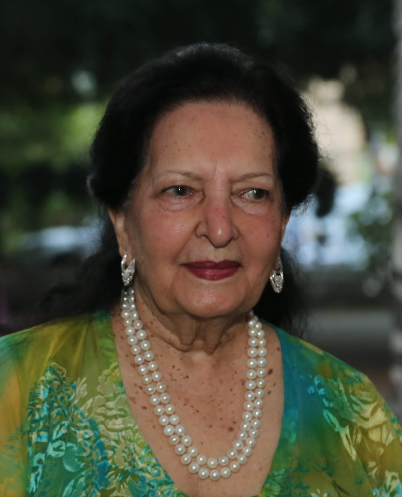
- Born: 17 August 1930; Hyderabad, Hyderabad State, India
- Died: 13 January 2026 (aged 95); Hyderabad, Telangana, India
- Spouse(s): Srikishen Seth; Gunturu Seshendra Sarma
- Writing career
- Notable works: Return Eternity (1965); Partings in Mimosa (1968); Memories of the Deccan (2008)

Indirā Dēvi Dhanarājgīr (Telugu: ఇందిరా దేవి ధనరాజ్గీర్; 17 August 1930 – 13 January 2026), better known as Rajkumari Indira Devi, was an Indian-English poet, painter, socialite and photography enthusiast from Hyderabad. She was nominated for the 1973 Nobel Prize in Literature.

== Life and career ==
=== Early life ===
Indira was born to Raja Dhanrajgirji Bahadur, a philanthropist, and his wife, Rani Premila Devi. Her father was noted for having introduced many Western ideas and the game of cricket in Hyderabad, and was of service to the court of Mir Osman Ali Khan, the Nizam of Hyderabad. She was the eldest daughter of four and was tutored at home by an English governess. Her paternal grandfather, Raja Saheb Narsinghji Bahadur, was regarded "as the Rockefeller of the South." The Dhanrajgirs owned palaces in Bombay, Hyderabad, and Poona.

Initially, she studied high school at Mahbub School for Girls but was later homeschooled. At a young age, Indira met influential people: she played carrom with Kishen Pershad who served twice as Prime Minister of Hyderabad, Mir Yousuf Ali Khan, Salar Jung III gave her a Shetland pony on her first birthday, and listened to recitations of noted poet Allama Iqbal which inspired her to engage herself with poetry.

=== Literary career ===
Since her father was a literary enthusiast, Rajkumari Indira came into contact with English, Hindi, Urdu and Maratha literary figures from childhood. She taught herself how to type and started composing couplets in Urdu on the lawns of Gyan Bagh Palace, having been inspired by the works of Allama Iqbal, Ghalib and Sri Aurobindo. From her teenage years, Indira was also a photography enthusiast and started making a good collection of photographs, which she said, are worth being shared in the book.

In 1964, her first volume of poetry was published under the title The Apostle, followed later on by Return to Eternity and Yearnings and Other Poems in 1965 and 1966 respectively. During these times, she created a group of poets around her and turned the Gyan Bagh Palace a place for local poets, which included her future husband Gunturu Seshendra Sarma, Aziz Qaisi, Makhdoom Mohiuddin and Jwalamukhi, to meet, read, discuss and translate poetry.

Excerpt from Partings in Mimosa

Time, a singing continuity, sings it way,
Cutting back at unhealed wounds. Into this
Wounded dawn we sigh a pain,
To be lifted by the arms of a summer madness
And watch the echo retract, renunciate,
Disclaim and give up bordering away from proximity
Into the yesterday...

She later gained recognition among literary circles with her fourth publication, Partings in Mimosa. Literary critic Usharbudh Arya described it as "a really promising talent demonstrably conscious of the restraint which the use of free verse demands... [she] gives to her 483 lines a sense of enactive rhythm, a lingering, thoughtful gusto, [and] a corresponding control of structure."

At a time of increasing literary success, she suddenly gave up writing poetry after marrying Gunturu Seshendra Sarma in 1970. She did this, affirming: "There can't be two poets in one family." For that, Osmania University professor Kousar Azam said of her "as a poet belonging to the Aurobindo School of Poetry, she received some critical attention but now remains known, sadly, only to a select few."

In 1987, together with Seshendra, she attended a literary conference in Greece and had the privilege of acquainting the poets Yiannis Ritsos and Nikiforos Vrettakos. Throughout her life, she was well acquainted with people like Lord Mountbatten, Ali Sardar Jafri and Kaifi Azmi, and maintained close friendships with Javed Iqbal, Jawaharlal Nehru, Sarvepalli Radhakrishnan, Viswanatha Satyanarayana and the descendants of Nizam's family members.

The latest publication she wrote was a coffee table book about her family and the palace titled Memories of the Deccan which was dedicated to the eighth Nizam, Prince Mukarram Jah on his 7th birthday and Princess Esra Birgen, Princes Azmet Jah and Shehkar, in October 2008.

=== Paintings ===
In 1968, while chairperson of the Hindi Academy of Andhra Pradesh, she visited Mauritius and established a strong friendship with the Mauritian writer and painter, Malcolm de Chazal, from whom she acquired a dozen of his valuable paintings. A painter herself, an exhibition of her artworks was held under the leadership of M. F. Husain in the 1970s in Mumbai.

=== Personal life ===
In 1945, Rajkumari Indira was married to Srikishen Seth, nephew of the Prime Minister of Hyderabad Kishen Pershad, but their union was unlikely. Immediately after marriage, she beat Srikishen and ran away from him, and told her families and relatives that he was an unsuitable man for marital life. She filed a divorce against him until it was finalized in 1970.

In 1971, she was married to Gunturu Seshendra Sarma, a Telugu poet who already had three children from his previous marriage. She resided for the rest of her life at the Gyan Bagh Palace. Their wedding took place at the Hoysaleswara Temple in Karnataka.

=== Death ===
Rajkumari Indira died at her residence on 13 January 2026, at the age of 95. Anuradha Reddy described her passing as a loss that closes a chapter in the city"s social life, saying, "[She is] one of the last personalities who truly represented Hyderabad of that period." Raunaq Yar Khan, a Hyderabadi aristocrat and socialite, remembered her as sociable and generous with her time, "added glamour, style and warmth to any event... charming, well spoken and stylish."

Her final rites were performed at Amberpet crematorium in a very simple manner according to Telugu Vedic tradition by Vishwanath Shobhanadri, nephew of the poet Viswanatha Satyanarayana.

== Legal issues ==
In 2007, immediately after the death of her husband Seshendra, Rajkumari Indira created and submitted a false document to the court claiming that her husband delegated all the copyrights of his works to her, whereas Satyaki, her stepson, argued that in 1989, Seshendra promised all copyrights to his son as a birthday gift. Rajkumari Indira eventually took control of Seshendra's published works by paying money, and after finding this out, Satyaki filed a petition in the city civil court of Hyderabad that a violation of rights had taken place.

In 2018, after 10 years of investigation, the court declared that all copyrights rightfully belong to Satyaki and, with the help of Telangana Forensic Laboratory, the documents submitted by Rajkumari Indira were fake including a signature of her husband pasted therein.

== Honours ==
She became the first President and Chairperson of Hindi Academy of Andhra Pradesh, and vice-president of the Telugu Writers Conference in 1968. She has been also on the advisory panel of the Sahitya Academy, Urdu Committee, Andhra Pradesh and State Handicrafts Board, Government of Andhra Pradesh.

In 1973, she was nominated for the Nobel Prize in Literature by Krishna Srinivas, president of the World Poetry Society Intercontinental (WPSI). She was the first Indian woman to receive such honour.

In November 2019, the Rajkumari Indira Devi Hall (originally the Golden Threshold) at University of Hyderabad was inaugurated in her honour, transforming it into a cultural and literary hub. An autobiographical book entitled Alanati Kadha was published by D. Chandrasekhar Reddy in her honor.

== Publications ==
=== Poetry collections ===
- The Apostle (Ajoykumar Mitra, 1964)
- Return to Eternity (Ajoykumar Mitra, 1965)
- Yearnings and Other Poems (N.P., 1966)
- Partings in Mimosa (M.L. Dhawan, 1968)
- Poems of My National Memory (Indian Languages Forum, 1976)
- Wind Blows from the Scaffold (N.P., 1976)

=== Private distributions ===
- Commitment (1969) (Note: Commitment and Tide were published for private distribution only.)
- Tide (1974)

=== Non-fiction ===
- Memories of the Deccan (Visual Quest India, 2008)

=== Translations ===
- Seshajyotsna: Telugu Modern Indian Classic by Guṇṭūru Śēṣēndraśarma (Indian Languages Forum, 1974) (translated into English)
