= Antonio Meocci =

Italian journalist and writer (1912–1988)

- Born: 20 March 1912; Grosseto, Kingdom of Italy
- Died: 17 October 1988 (aged 76); Grosseto, Italy
- Education: University of Florence
- Occupations: Journalist, writer

Antonio Meocci (20 March 1912 – 17 October 1988) was an Italian journalist, writer and partisan.

== Life and career ==
Born in Grosseto, Meocci graduated in literature and philosophy from the University of Florence. In 1938, he founded together with Geno Pampaloni the art and literary journal Ansedonia, serving as its first chief editor. Initially based in Grosseto, the journal relocated to Rome in 1940, and published contributions by writers including Giorgio Caproni, Libero Bigiaretti, and Renzo Laurano.

During the Italian resistance movement, he joined the National Liberation Committee (CLN) of Grosseto and served as its president from June to November 1944. He was involved in the production of an underground newspaper for partisan groups during World War II.

After the war, Meocci worked as a journalist for several Italian newspapers, including l'Unità, Il Paese, and Paese Sera. He also collaborated with Il Telegrafo, Vie Nuove, Rinascita, Corriere del Ticino, La Fiera Letteraria, and the TG2 television news programme.

Meocci published several literary works, including the anthology Maremma (1956), the novel Maramad (1969), the poetry collection Quasi lunare (1971), and the novel L'uomo tre occhi (1982). He died on 17 October 1988.

== Works ==
- Mia terra: 1936–1943. Rome: De Luca, 1943
- Maremma. Florence: Olimpia, 1956 (2nd ed. 1969)
- Maramad, Rome: Barulli, 1969
- Quasi lunare. Rome: Barulli, 1971
- L'uomo tre occhi. Livorno: Nuova Fortezza, 1982
