= Antonio Aniante =

Italian playwright (1900 – 1983)

Antonio Aniante (2 January 1900, Viagrande – 6 November 1983, Ventimiglia), pseudonym of Antonio Rapisarda, was an Italian writer and playwright.

== Biography ==
Aniante made his debut as a journalist for the magazine "900", Cahiers d'Italie et d'Europe by Massimo Bontempelli and Curzio Malaparte, but soon revealed himself to be a good playwright. He was initially inspired by themes typical of magic realism and futurism.

Opposed to fascism during the thirties, Aniante lived for a long time in Paris, where he published several biographies: Italo Balbo, Gabriele D'Annunzio, Mustapha Kemal, Vie et aventures de Marco Polo. On his return to Italy, he published Ricordi di un giovane troppo presto invecchiatosi in 1939. In Paris, in 1932, he met the Turkish painter Hale Asaf, who had fled to Europe abandoning her husband. He became her companion until her death in 1938.

Among Aniante's main works are the avant-garde comedies written for the Teatro degli Indipendenti in Rome were Carmen Darling (1929, performed by Carlo Ludovico Bragaglia) and his masterpiece La rosa di zolfo (1958, presented by Domenico Modugno at the Venice Prose Festival). He also published the numerous novels including Figlio del sole (1965), which won the Premio Selezione Campiello. Subsequently, he published Memorie di Francia (1973) and Vita di Bellini (1925).

In 1973, Aniante was nominated for the Nobel Prize in Literature by Italian poet Vittorio Vettori.

== Publications ==
=== Plays ===
- Gelsomino d'Arabia (1926)
- Bob-Taft (1927)
- Carmen Darling (1929)
- La rosa di zolfo (1958)

=== Fiction ===
- Sara Lilas: Romanzo di Montmartre (1923)
- Amore mortale (1928)
- Venere ciprigna: Novelle (1929)
- Il paradiso dei 15 anni (1929)
- Ultime notti di Taormina (1930)
- Obbrobriose confessioni (1952)
- La zitellina (1953)
- L'uomo di genio dinnanzi alla morte (1958)
- Figlio del sole (1965)

=== Memoirs ===
- Memorie di Francia (1973)

=== Biographies ===
- Vita di Bellini (1925; 1986)
- Gabriele D'Annunzio (1934)
- Mustapha Kémal (1934)
- Vie et aventures de Marco Polo
