= Kuliak languages =

Family of languages

Kuliak
- Rub
- Geographic distribution: Karamoja region, northeastern Uganda
- Linguistic classification: Nilo-Saharan?: Kuliak
- Proto-language: Proto-Kuliak
- Subdivisions: Ik; Nyang'i–Soo

Language codes
- Glottolog: kuli1252
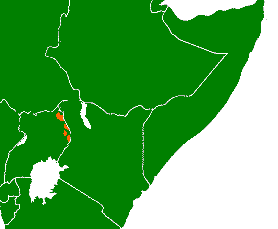

The Kuliak languages, also called the Rub languages, or Nyangiyan languages are a group of languages spoken by small relict communities in the mountainous Karamoja region of northeastern Uganda.

Nyang'i and Soo are moribund, with a handful of elderly speakers. However, Ik is vigorous and growing.

Word order in Kuliak languages is verb-initial.

== Names ==
The Kuliak languages are also called the Rub languages by Ehret (1981), since Ehret reconstructed "Rub" to mean 'person' in Proto-Kuliak. He suggests that "Kuliak" may actually be a derogatory term used by neighboring Nilotic-speaking peoples to disparage Kuliak speakers as "poor," hence his preference for using Rub instead. However, Kuliak continues to be the most widely used name, and is preferred by Roger Blench, Terrill Schrock, Sam Beer and other linguists, who note that the name "Kuliak" is not perceived as offensive or pejorative by any Kuliak speakers.

== History ==
The Kuliak languages have previously had a much more extensive range in the past. Kuliak loanwords in the Luhya, Gusii, Kalenjin and Sukuma languages show that these peoples inhabited western Kenya and the southern parts of Lake Victoria before being absorbed by the ancestors of these Bantu and Nilotic speakers. These now extinct Kuliak peoples are known as the "Southern Rub". The Southern Rub lived as far south as Lake Eyasi, as shown by Kuliak loanwords in Hadza and Sandawe, and possibly as far east as the Kilimanjaro Region, as shown by Kuliak loanwords in the Chaga and Thagiicu languages.

== Classification ==
=== Internal ===
According to the classification of Heine (1976), Soo and Nyang'i form a subgroup, Western Kuliak, while Ik stands by itself.

- Kuliak
  - - Soo (Tepes, Kadam) – 50 speakers, moribund
    - Nyang'i (Nyangia) – 1 speaker, nearly extinct
  - Ik (Teuso) – 7,500 speakers, vigorous

According to Schrock (2015), "Dorobo" is a spurious language, is not a fourth Kuliak language, and may at most be a dialect of Ik.

Heine finds the following numbers of correspondences between the languages on the 200-word Swadesh list:

- Soo – Nyang'i: 43.2%
- Nyang'i – Ik: 26.7%
- Soo – Ik: 24.2%

=== External ===
Bender (1989) had classified the Kuliak languages within the Eastern Sudanic languages. Later, Bender (2000) revised this position by placing Kuliak as basal branch of Nilo-Saharan. Glottolog treats Kuliak as an independent language family and does not accept Nilo-Saharan as a valid language family.

An early suggestion for Ik as a member of Afroasiatic was made by Archibald Tucker in the 1960s; this was criticized as weak and abandoned by the 1980s.

== Evolution ==
The following sound correspondences are identified by Bernd Heine (1976), who proposes also corresponding Proto-Kuliak reconstructions.

Kuliak consonant correspondences
Ik	Tepes	Nyang'i	Proto-Kuliak	Phonological environment
b	b ~ p	b	*b	
ɓ	ɓ	ɓ	*ɓ	
ɗ ~ d	d	d	*d	
dz	∅	∅	*dz	Initially. Fricative z in Dorobo.
d	s	(?)	*dz	Medially. No reflexes known in Nyang'i.
ɟ ~ ʄ	ɟ	ɟ	*ɟ	
g	g	g	*g	Initially, before back vowels
ɟ	g	ɟ	*g	Initially, before front vowels
g	∅	∅	*g	Medially
f	p	p	*p	
t	t	t	*t	
ts	c	c	*c	
c	k	k	*kj	Initially and medially
h	k	k	*kj	Finally
k	k	k	*k	
kw	w	kw	*kw	Word-initially
k	∅	∅	*kʰ	
tsʼ	ʄ	ʄ	*cʼ	Initially
s	s	s	*cʼ	Medially
kʼ	ɠ	ɠ	*kʼ	
s	s	s	*s	Initially
r	s	s	*s	Medially
ɬ	l	ɬ	*ɬ	Initially
ɬ	l	iɬ	*ɬ	Finally
h	∅	∅	*h	Initially
∅	ʔ	∅	*h	Finally
z	(?)	s	*z	No reflex known in Tepes
m	m	m	*m	
n	n	n	*n	
ɲ	ɲ	ɲ	*ɲ	
ŋ	ŋ	ŋ	*ŋ	Initially, by default
ɲ	ŋ	ŋ	*ŋ	Initially, before *ɛ
r	?	ɲ	*ŋ	Medially and finally
l	l	l	*l	Finally, a plosive /t/ in Dorobo.
r	r	r	*r	Initially and at the end of monosyllabic words
r	∅	r	*r	Elsewhere
r	r	r	*rr	Medially
∅	j	∅	*j	Initially and finally
j	j	j	*j	Medially
w	w	w	*w	Default
w ~ ∅	∅	w	*w	Finally after *k, *g

Kuliak vowel correspondences
Ik	Tepes	Nyang'i	Proto-Kuliak	Phonological environment
a	a	a	*a	Default
a	a	ɛ	*a	Preceded by any non-open vowel
a	e	e	*a	Followed by a high vowel *i, *u
a	ɛ	ɛ	*a	Unstressed, when followed by a semivowel *j, *w
ɛ	ɛ	ɛ	*ɛ	In Tepes and Nyang'i, /e/ and /ɛ/ can alternate morphophonologically.
e	e	e	*e	In Tepes and Nyang'i, /e/ and /ɛ/ can alternate morphophonologically.
i	e	e	*ẹ	In Tepes and Nyang'i, /e/ and /ɛ/ can alternate morphophonologically.
e	i	i	*I	
i	i	i	*i	
ɔ	ɔ	ɔ	*ɔ	In Tepes and Nyang'i, /o/ and /ɔ/ can alternate morphophonologically.
o	o	o	*o	In Tepes and Nyang'i, /o/ and /ɔ/ can alternate morphophonologically.
u	o	o	*ọ	In Tepes and Nyang'i, /o/ and /ɔ/ can alternate morphophonologically.
o	u	u	*U	
u	u	u	*u	

For other vowel correspondences, Heine reconstructs clusters of vowels:

- Front vowel + *o: yields Ik /ɔ/ or /o/, a front vowel in Tepes and Nyang'i.
- Close vowel + *a or *ɔ: cluster retained in Nyang'i, contracted to a single vowel in the other languages.
- *a, *i + *e, *i, *u: cluster retained in Ik, contracted to a single vowel in the other languages.
- *ui: yields Ik /i/, Tepes /u/ or /wi/, Nyang'i /wi/.

Heine reconstructs two classes of stress in Proto-Kuliak: "primary", which could occur in any position and remains in place in all Kuliak languages, and "secondary", which always occurred on the 2nd syllable of a word, and remains there in Ik and Nyang'i, but shifts to the first syllable in Tepes.

Blench notes that Kuliak languages do not have extensive internal diversity and clearly had a relatively recent common ancestor. There are many monosyllabic VC (vowel + consonant) lexical roots in Kuliak languages, which is typologically unusual among Nilo-Saharan languages and is more typical of some Australian languages such as Kunjen. Blench considers these VC roots to have cognates in other Nilo-Saharan languages, and suggests that the VC roots may have been eroded from earlier Nilo-Saharan roots that had initial consonants.

Significant influences from Cushitic languages, and more recently Eastern Nilotic languages, are observable in the vocabulary and phonology of Kuliak languages. Blench notes that Kuliak appears to retain a core of non-Nilo-Saharan vocabulary, suggesting language shift from an indigenous language like that seen in Dahalo.

== Numerals ==
Comparison of numerals in individual languages:

Language	1	2	3	4	5	6	7	8	9	10
Ik (1)	kɔ̀nʊ̀kᵓ (lit. and it's one)	lèɓètsìn (lit. and it's two)	àɗìn (lit. and it's three)	tsʼàɡùsìn (lit. and it's four)	tùdìn (lit. and it's five)	tudini ńda kɛɗɪ kɔn (5+ 1)	tudini ńda kiɗi léɓetsᵉ (5+ 2)	tudini ńda kiɗi aɗ (5+ 3)	tudini ńda kiɗi tsʼaɡús (5+ 4)	tomín
Ik (2)	kɔnᵃ	léɓetsᵃ	aɗᵃ / aɗᵉ	tsʔaɡúsᵃ	túdᵉ	ńda-keɗi-kɔnᵃ (5+ 1)	ńda-kiɗi-léɓetsᵃ (5+ 2)	ńda-kiɗiá-aɗᵉ (5+ 3)	ńda-kiɗi-tsʔaɡúsᵃ (5+ 4)	tomín
Nyang'i	nardok	nɛʔɛc	iyʔɔn	nowʔe	tud	mɔk kan kapei				mɔk tomin
Soo (Tepes) (1)	nɛ́dɛ̀s	ínɛ̀'bɛ́c	ínì'jɔ̀n	ín'ùáʔ	íntùd	ˌíntùd ká ˈnɛ́dɛ̀s (5+ 1)	ˌíntùd ká ínɛ̀'bɛ̀c (5+ 2)	ˌíntùd ká ínì'jɔ́n (5+ 3)	ˌíntùd ká ínùáʔ (5+ 4)	mì'míɾínìk
Soo (Tepes) (2)	ɛdɛs	nɛbɛc	iyon	nowa	tuɗ	tuɗ ka nɪ ɛdɛs (5+ 1)	tuɗ ka nɪ nɛbɛc (5+ 2)	tuɗ ka nɪ iyon (5+ 3)	tuɗ ka nɪ nowa (5+ 4)	tuɗ en-ek iɠe (hand-PL all)

== See also ==
- List of Proto-Kuliak reconstructions (Wiktionary)
