= Vettori =

Vettori is an Italian surname. Notable people with the surname include:

- Daniel Vettori (born 1979), New Zealand cricketer
- Ernst Vettori (born 1964), Austrian ski jumper
- Francesco Vettori (1474–1539), correspondent of Niccolò Machiavelli
- Luca Vettori (born 1991), Italian volleyball player
- Marvin Vettori (born 1993), Italian mixed martial artist
- Piero Vettori (1499–1585), also known as Petrus Victorius, an Italian classical scholar known for his publication of Ancient Greek texts
- Vittorio Vettori (1920–2004), Italian poet
