= Gyan Bagh Palace =

Coordinates: 17.3800°N 78.4658°E

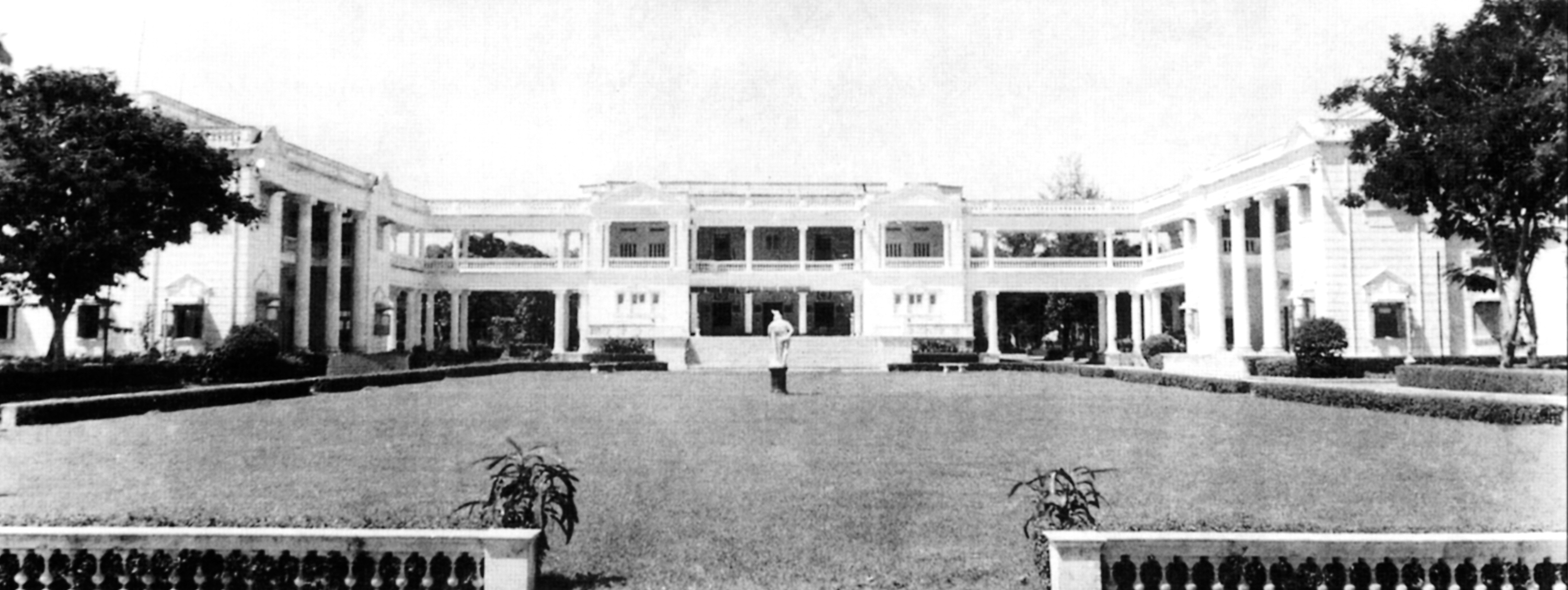
- Façade of Gyan Bagh Palace, in 1929
- Interactive map of the Gyan Bagh Palace area

General information
- Architectural style: Palladian
- Location: Hyderabad, India
- Completed: 1890; 136 years ago

Gyan Bagh Palace constructed in 1890 is a noble palace constructed in European architecture style, and is located in Hyderabad, India. It was the residence of Nobel Prize nominee Indira Devi Dhanrajgir from 1971 until her death in January 2026.
