= Nyangia =

Nyang'i
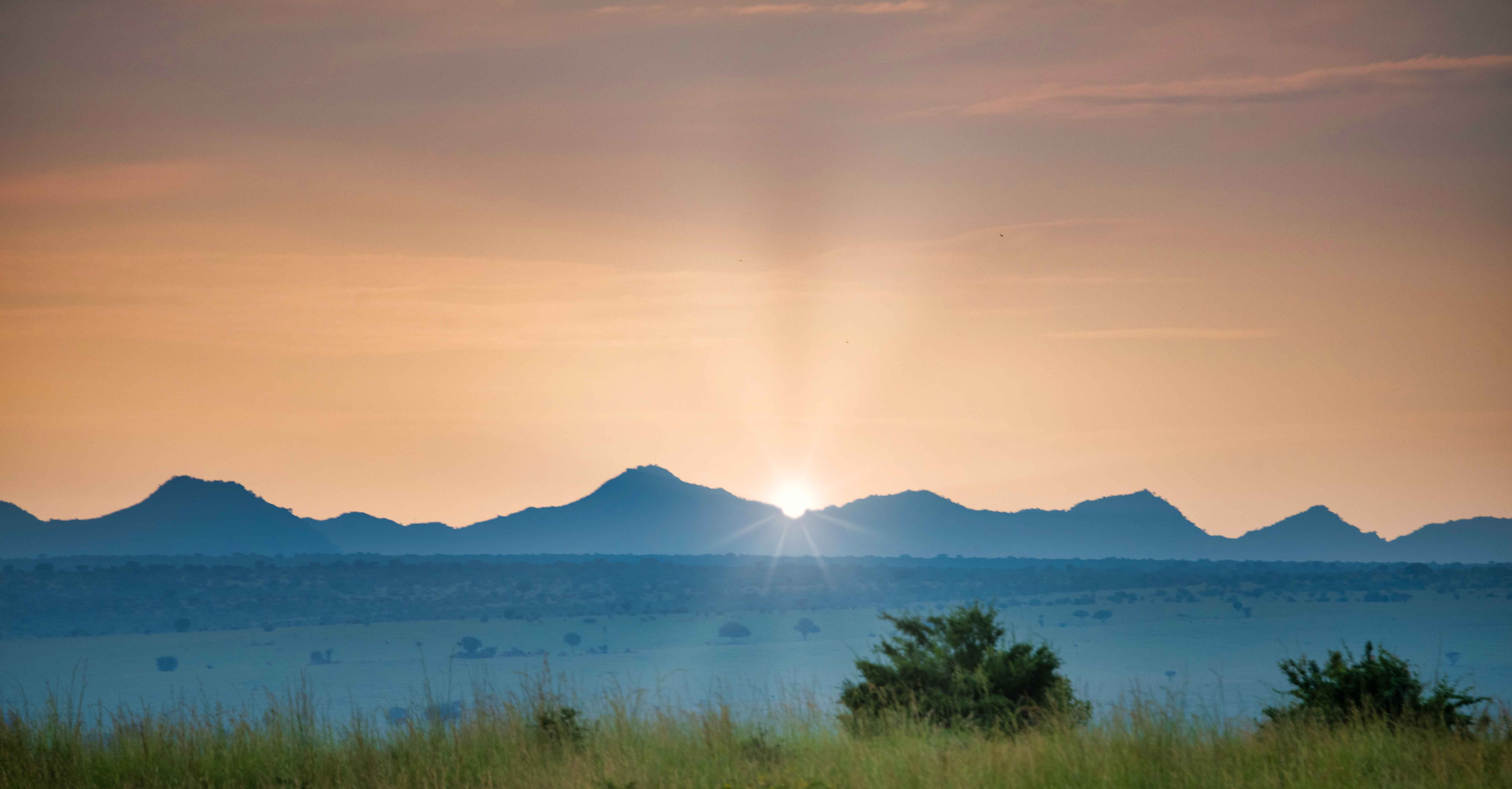
- A mountain range in Karamoja, Uganda

Total population
- 9,634 (2014, census)

Regions with significant populations
- Uganda
- Uganda: 9,634

Languages
- Karamojong, Nyang'i

Religion
- Traditional beliefs

Related ethnic groups
- Nilotic peoples, Maasai people
- The Nyangia are known for their traditional farming practices and cultural attire similar to that of the Maasai.

The Nyangia community are a tribe in North-eastern Uganda. They live on the slopes of Nyangea Mountains, west of Kidepo Valley National Park, along the Ugandan border with South Sudan. The Nyangia also called Nyang'i, Nyangea or Nyangia are part of the Nilotic ethnic group largely found in Karenga District in Karamoja.

== Language ==
The people in Nyangia community speak a language known as the "Nyangiya" or "Nyang'i". It is nearly extinct, with only one remaining semi-speaker.

== Location ==
Nyangia community are a tribe found in Karenge District and along the slopes of Nyangea Mountains parallel to Uganda's borders with South Sudan. Its found at Latitude 3.7292° N, and Longitude 33.7071° E

== History ==
The Nyangia tribe are among the Five Indigenous Minority Groups in Karamoja Sub-Region. A census conducted in 2014 buy Uganda National Bureau of Statistics indicates that 9,634 Nyangia people existed in the Karamoja Sub-Region. Majority of the Nyangia people live in Karenga District.

== Culture ==
Nyangia tribe are predominantly farmers and they grow crops like maize, sorghum, millet, vegetables, beans among others. Traditionally, the Nyangia tribe emulates a dress code related to the Maasai people which involves wearing beads for the women and Maasai Shuka for the men. The Nyangia people are great hunters and gather wild fruits as well as hunting animals for food.

== See also ==
- Banyaruguru
- Buganda people
- Lango people
