= New Site, South Sudan =

New Site is a village in South Sudan near the border with Kenya. It is used by the SPLA/M as the location for their headquarters and was selected due to being near the Kenyan border and providing forests for protection against aerial bombardment.

There is also a community of several hundred Ik language speakers in New Site.
