= Gunturu Seshendra Sarma =

Indian poet (1927–2007)

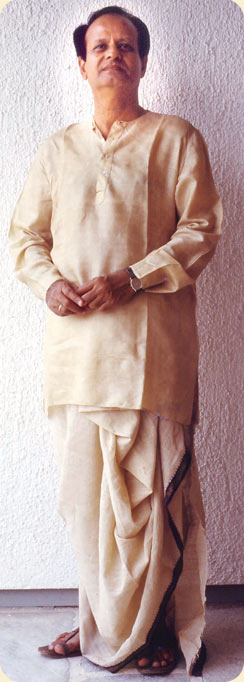
- Seshendra Sarma
- Born: 20 October 1927; Nagarajupadu, Nellore District, Andhra Pradesh, India
- Died: 30 May 2007 (aged 79); Hyderabad, India
- Occupation: Poet
- Spouse(s): G.Janaki, Rajkumari Indira Devi Dhanrajgir

Gunturu Seshendra Sarma B.A. B.L. (20 October 1927 – 30 May 2007), also known as Yuga Kavi, was a Telugu poet, critic and litterateur. He is well known for his works Naa Desam, Naa Prajalu and Kaala Rekha. He authored over fifty works which have been translated into English, Kannada, Urdu, Bengali, Hindi, Nepali and Greek.

== Early life ==
Gunturu Seshendra Sarma was born on 20 October 1927.

== Personal life ==
At 18 years of age, Sarma's marriage was arranged to Gunturu Janaki (née Yeddanapudi Janaki), and they had two sons and two daughters: Vasundhara (1951), Revathi (1953), Vanamaali (1956) and Satyaki (1958). Later in 1970 he married Indira Devi Dhanrajgir, an Indo Anglican poet. Till his death on 30 May 2007, he lived with her at her Gyanbagh Palace. His love for his children was limitless - “an ocean of love” in his own words. His joy knew no bounds whenever he saw his children and grandchildren (see foto). In a literary biography “Seshendra velugu niidallo” written by his son Vanamali Gunturu, the author describes the literary genius and unparalleled scholarship of his father, his evolution from an everybody’s darling in a small village Thotapalliguduru till his complete maturity as author and intellectual, who was engaged in an incessant fight against the brute power of the state and was a victim of political persecution. At the same time the biography shows how his wife Janaki had to swallow the pangs of being married to such a historical person as Seshendra and the injustice being done to her.

Seshendra

Seshendra with his son and grandchildren

== Works ==
Seshendra Sarma is the second person to have been nominated for the Nobel Literature prize for his contribution to literary field from India, the first being Rabindranath Tagore. The West Bengal Government conferred upon him the title "Rashtrendu" (Moon of the Nation) in honour of his accomplishments. Telugu University conferred an honorary D.Litt. on him in 1994. He received the "Kalidas Samman" award from the Madhya Pradhesh government. He won a Central Sahitya Akademi fellowship in 1999. The other important awards Seshendra received are ‘Subrahmanya Bharati Ekta Award’ from the Hindi Academy, Rashtriya Sanskriti Puraskar’, ‘Ugadi Puraskar’, ‘Tilak Award’ and ‘Sahitya Ratna 2001’ from Sri Ram Sahitya Mandal, Himachal Pradesh. He has been nominated as a member to the ‘Kendriya Hindi Samithi’ by Prime Minister of India. He was selected for Hamsa Award, in 2004-05, by the Govt. of AP.

Seshendra's first work in print appeared in 1952. It is the translation of Matthew Arnold's Sohrab and Rustum, which is based upon the Persian Epic Shahnama. Initially he focused on poetry and occasionally worked on literary criticism. Seshendra's first collection of prose-poems was entitled Sesha Jyotsna. He composed it in strict conformation with Telugu prosody which was published in 1972 in Telugu and English. Its translations into Hindi and Urdu appeared separately.

His magnum opus Naa Desam, Naa Prajalu (My Country, My People, Meri Dharti, Mere Log) brought Seshendra prominence as one of the outstanding poets of India. It led to his nomination for the Nobel Prize in Literature in 2004.

Shodasi, his tantric commentaries on the Ramayana, and Swarna Hamsa, the study of Harsha Naishadhiya Charita, are works of literary criticism. Kaala Rekha, Seshendras' 1994 book, is a collection of twenty-five essays on various subjects like ancient Sanskrit drama and ancient Greek drama, comparative literature, classical poetry and Aurobindo's Savitri.

The collection of poems Neerai Paaripoyindi (literally, "Melted away") was brought out in 1976 in bilingual editions.

== Death ==
Sarma died on 30 May 2007.

=== Legacy ===
Sarma has been a subject of various thesis dissertations for PhD in Telugu literature.

Dr. Vanamali Gunturu, Seshendra velugu niidallo - nannato na anubhavalu, EMESCO 2021

== Awards and titles conferred ==
- 1994 Sahitya Akademi Award in Telugu literature for his work Kaala Rekha – won
- 1994 Honorary D.Litt. by Telugu University
- 1999 Central Sahitya Akademi fellowship for contribution to Telugu literature
- 2001 Sahitya Ratna by Sri Ram Sahitya Mandal, Himachal Pradesh - won
- Jnanpeeth award for contribution to Telugu literature – nominated
- 2004 Nobel Prize in Literature for My Country, My People – nominated
- 2004-2005 Hamsa Award by Andhra Pradesh State Government for contribution to Telugu literature - won
- Rashtrendu (Moon of the Nation) by West Bengal State Government
- Kalidas Samman by Madhya Pradesh State Government
- Subrahmanya Ekta Award by Hindi Academy - won
- Rashtriya Sanskriti Puraskar - won
- Ugadi Puraskar - won
- Lokamanya Tilak Award - won
- Member of Kendriya Hindi Samiti - nominated by Prime Minister of India
