= Giuseppe Isnardi =

Italian historian, geographer and educator (1886–1965)

- Born: 13 August 1886; Sanremo, Kingdom of Italy
- Died: 7 June 1965 (aged 78); Rome, Italy
- Occupations: Historian, geographer, educator

Giuseppe Isnardi (13 August 1886 – 7 June 1965) was an Italian historian, geographer, educator, and scholar of Southern Italy. He was particularly known for his studies on Calabria and for his work against illiteracy in the Italian South in collaboration with the Associazione Nazionale per gli Interessi del Mezzogiorno d'Italia (ANIMI).

== Life and career ==
Isnardi graduated in literature from the University of Turin in 1907. In 1912 he moved to Catanzaro, where he worked as a secondary-school teacher and began his research on the southern question and the history and geography of Calabria.

Through ANIMI, Isnardi became involved in educational projects aimed at combating illiteracy in Southern Italy. From 1921 to 1928 he directed the schools managed by the association in Calabria, contributing to the development of rural education in the region. He contributed several articles on the geography of Calabria to the Enciclopedia Italiana.

From 1928 to 1934 he taught at the classical high school "Carducci-Ricasoli" in Grosseto, where he influenced several students, including the future literary critic Geno Pampaloni. He later taught in Pisa until 1951.

After moving to Rome, Isnardi resumed his educational advisory role for ANIMI and became co-director, together with Umberto Zanotti Bianco, of the journal Archivio Storico per la Calabria e la Lucania. From 1963 until his death in 1965, he directed the "Giustino Fortunato" library of Southern Italian studies in Rome.

== Sources ==
- Guzzo, Giuseppe (2005). La pedagogia di Giuseppe Isnardi. L'apostolato di un educatore nella Calabria del primo Novecento (in Italian). Soveria Mannelli: Rubbettino.
- Napolitano, Saverio (2014). Giuseppe Isnardi (1886-1965). Coscienza nazionale e meridionalismo (in Italian). Soveria Mannelli: Rubbettino.
