= Ik language =

Kuliak language of Uganda

Ik
- Icé-tód
- Pronunciation: [ītʃé-tôd̥̚]
- Region: Uganda
- Ethnicity: Ik
- Native speakers: 14,000 (2014)
- Language family: Nilo-Saharan?: Kuliak; Ik
- Dialects: Dorobo?

Language codes
- ISO 639-3: ikx
- Glottolog: ikkk1242
- ELP: Ik

Ik (also known as Icetot, Icietot, Ngulak or (derogatory) Teuso, Teuth) is one of the Kuliak languages of northeastern Uganda. The Kuliak languages form their own branch of the proposed Nilo-Saharan language family. With the other two Kuliak languages being moribund, Ik may soon be the sole remaining language of its family.

A comprehensive dictionary and grammar of Ik has been published in Schrock (2017).

== Names ==
The Ik refer to their own language as Icé-tód [ītʃé-tôd̥̚].

According to Schrock (2015), as a spurious language, Dorobo does not actually exist as a fourth Kuliak language, and may at most be a dialect of Ik.

== Distribution ==
Ik speakers have traditionally resided in Kamion Subcounty, Kaabong District, Uganda, with the Kamion Subcounty consisting of the five parishes Kapalu, Timu, Kamion, Lokwakaramoe, and Morungole. Their traditional homeland is a 50 kilometer-long narrow strip of territory along the Kenya-Uganda border, stretching from Mount Morungole and Kidepo National Park in the north to Mount Lopokok and Timu Forest in the south. Some Ik-speaking villages in Kaabong District are Pirre, Morungole, and Oropoi.

Within the past few decades, Ik-speaking communities have also sprouted up in the following locations.

- Several hundred Ik in New Site, South Sudan (in Eastern Equatoria state, South Sudan)
- Approximately 100 Ik across towns and cities northwestern Kenya, including Kakuma
- A small Ik community in Masindi District, western Uganda

== Sociolinguistics ==
Today, Ik is a highly vital language, although many speakers are also fluent in the local Teso–Turkana languages (such as the Dodoth dialect of Karimojong), Swahili, and to a lesser extent, English.

The Ik language is still stable, as young children still learn the language and remain monolingual until they go to school, and Ik is spoken in all domains of life. Although the community subtly pressures its children to learn more widely spoken languages like Turkana, they see this multilingualism as good without being detrimental to the vitality of their own language. The community sees the language as vital to maintaining their ethnic identity and wants their children to learn Ik in school.

== Phonology ==
The Ik phonemic inventory, as documented by Schrock (2014), is given below.

Consonants include ejectives and implosives.

Consonants
		Bilabial	Labiodental	Alveolar	Postalveolar	Palatal	Velar
Stop	voiceless	p		t			k
Stop	voiced	b		d			ɡ
Stop	implosive	ɓ		ɗ		ʄ ⟨ʝ⟩	kʼ~ɠ ⟨ƙ⟩
Affricate	voiceless			t͡s ⟨ts⟩	t͡ʃ ⟨c⟩		
Affricate	ejective			t͡sʼ ⟨ts'⟩			
Affricate	voiced			d͡z ⟨dz⟩	d͡ʒ ⟨j⟩		
Fricative	voiceless		f	s	ʃ ⟨x⟩		
Fricative	voiced			z	ʒ		
Nasal		m		n		ɲ	ŋ
Approximant				l		j ⟨y⟩	w
Flap				ɾ			

Ik displays ATR vowel harmony.

Vowels
	Front		Central		Back	
	+ATR	-ATR	+ATR	-ATR	+ATR	-ATR
Close	i	ɪ ⟨ɨ⟩			u	ʊ ⟨ʉ⟩
Mid	e	ɛ	ə		o	ɔ
Open				a		

Three additional phonemes, /tlʼ, ɬ, ɮ/, were originally in the language but were lost in the early 21st century.

== Lexicon ==
Some Ik names for native plants and animals (which are also found in Kidepo National Park) are:

=== Flora ===
Ik name	English name	Scientific name
asʊnán	African pencil cedar	Juniperus procera
átsʼᵃ	Sycamore fig	Ficus sycomorus
ɓʊkʊ́lá	Gerrard’s acacia	Vachellia gerrardi
ɡáʒadᵃ	Red-pod terminalia	Terminalia brownii
ɪtɪt́ ɪ ́	Flame tree	Erythrina abyssinica
mʊs	Candelabra	Euphorbia candelabrum
tsʊmˊ	Desert date	Balanites aegyptiaca
tsʊ́ʊ́r	White-thorn acacia	Acacia hockii

Ik crops include:

- sorghum (ŋám)
- finger millet (rébᵃ)
- maize (ɲaɓʊraˊ) (introduced New World crop)
- pumpkins (kaiɗeˊ) (introduced New World crop)
- beans (moriɗᵃ)
- vegetable greens (waicíkᵃ)

=== Fauna ===
Ik name	English name	Scientific name
borokᵃ	Bushpig	Potamochoerus porcus
ɡasoˊ	Warthog	Phacochoerus aethiopicus
kɔtɔ́r	Oribi	Ourebia ourebi
kʊláɓᵃ	Bushbuck	Tragelaphus scriptus
ŋamurˊ	Common duiker	Sylvicapra grimmia
ŋʊrˊ	Cane rat	Thryonomys swinderianus
ɲól	Günther’s dik-dik	Madoqua guentheri
róɡᵃ	Mountain reedbuck	Redunca fulvorufula
tɔrɔmɪɲ	Crested porcupine	Hystrix cristata
tsɔ́r	Baboon	Papio cynocephalus
alálá	Augur buzzard	Buteo augur
fúluƙurú	White-crested turaco	Tauraco leucolophus
itsókᵃ	Amethyst sunbird	Chalcomitra amethystina
ƙáraƙár	Green wood-hoopoe	Phoeniculus purpureus
kíryooró	Crested helmet shrike	Prionops plumatus
kʊ́rakᵃ	Fan-tailed raven	Corvus rhipidurus
múɗuɗú	Senegal coucal	Centropus senegalensis
tsitsᵃ	Gabar goshawk	Micronisus gabar

=== Society ===
Like the neighboring Nilotic peoples, the Ik people have age-groups (cohorts), each with its own assigned totem. Nowadays, the traditional Ik age-group system is mostly obsolete (Heine 1999).

- basaúr 'eland'
- gasar 'buffalo'
- gwaɪ́tsʼᵃ 'giraffe'
- kaɗokóⁱ 'vervet monkey'
- koɗowᵃ 'gazelle'
- leweɲ 'ostrich'
- ráɡwᵃ 'ox'

Traditional Ik society also has terms for specific prohibitions and taboos, such as:

- bɔsɛ́s 'prohibition against fining children or youth'
- cuᵉ 'prohibition against failing to give water to elders first'
- dɛ 'prohibition against failing to give leg-meat to elders'
- ifófóés 'prohibition against eating the first harvest secretly'
- imwáŋón 'prohibition against seeing your mother-in-law'

== See also ==
- Ik word list (Wiktionary)
