= Xu Xu =

Chinese writer

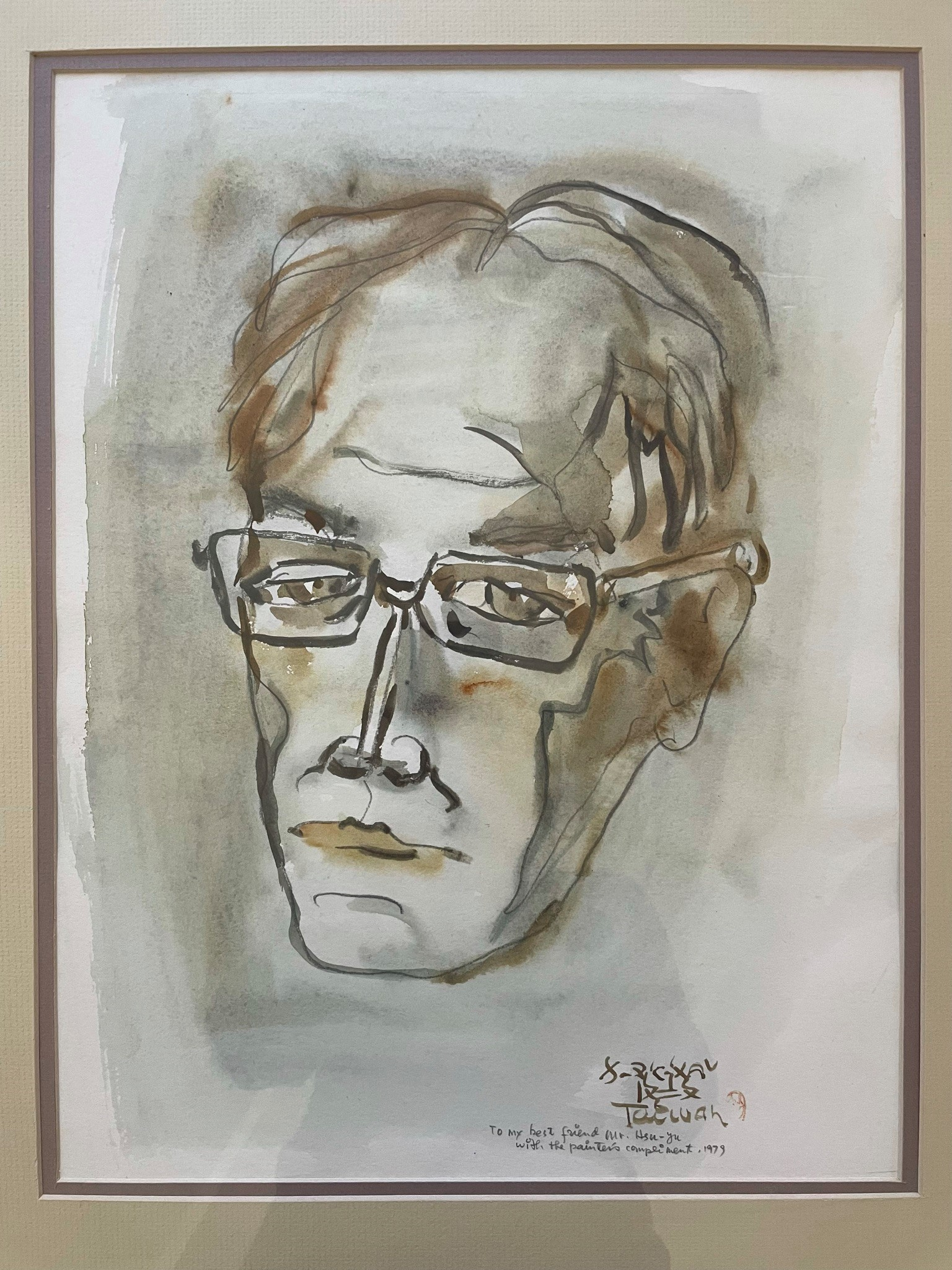
Portrait of Xu Xu by Max Liu, 1979.

Xu Xu, a.k.a. Hsu Yu (徐訏), was the pen name of Xu Boxu (徐伯訏; 11 November 1908 – 5 October 1980), an important figure in modern Chinese literature. Born in Cixi in the coastal province of Zhejiang, Xu Xu attended Peking University between 1927 and 1932 where he studied philosophy and psychology. In 1932, he moved to Shanghai where he became an associate of Lin Yutang, a liberal and polyglot intellectual who ran a number of successful literary journals. In 1950, Xu Xu left the newly founded People's Republic of China for Hong Kong where he stayed for the rest of his life. Best known as the author of the modern gothic tale Ghost Love (鬼戀, 1937) or his wartime spy-epic The Rustling Wind (風蕭蕭, 1944), Xu Xu was also a prolific poet, playwright, essayist, literary critic, journal editor, and professor of literature. Many of his popular novels were turned into movies or TV series in post-war Hong Kong and Taiwan. As a writer, editor, and educator, Xu Xu has had a formative impact on a younger generation of post-war writers emerging in Hong Kong and Taiwan. In much of his fiction, and especially in his later works from Hong Kong, Xu Xu explored reality-defying experiences and displayed neo-romantic tendencies, such as aesthetic escapism and mysticism, which place him in the proximity of other modern artists associated with the global revival of romanticism in the 20th century. He was nominated for the 1973 Nobel Prize in Literature.

== Early career ==
In the 1930s, Xu Xu worked as an editor for several of Lin Yutang's journal ventures in Shanghai, such as the bi-monthlies The Analects (論語) and This Human World (人間世), two journals that published predominantly prose essays (小品文). In 1936, Xu Xu went to Paris to study Philosophy at the Sorbonne. In early 1937, while still abroad, his novella Ghost Love in which a modern urbanite falls in love with a woman who claims to be a ghost appeared in the Shanghai bi-monthly Celestial Winds (宇宙風) to great acclaim. Later that year, Xu Xu hastily returned to China following the outbreak of war with Japan. From the relative safety of the Shanghai International Settlement, Xu Xu continued to publish largely apolitical fiction and travel essays that were characterized by lyrical exoticism and a distinctly cosmopolitan outlook. When all of Shanghai was occupied by Japanese forces in the wake of the attack on Pearl Harbor in 1941, Xu Xu left Shanghai for Chongqing, the wartime capital of the Chinese Nationalist government. Here, Xu Xu's wartime novel The Rustling Wind was serialized in the wartime newspaper Enemy Annihilation (掃蕩報) in 1943. An epic about espionage and romance in occupied Shanghai, The Rustling Wind made Xu Xu one of the most widely read authors of the war years.

== Post-war period ==
Throughout the 1930s and 1940s, Xu Xu's fiction had frequently been criticized by leftist critics as escapist and detrimental to their revolutionary agenda. As a result, Xu Xu decided to leave the newly founded People's Republic of China in 1950 for Hong Kong. In Hong Kong, Xu Xu continued his writing career and throughout the 1950s published dozens of short stories and novellas, most of which appeared in the literary supplements of the Hong Kong newspapers Sing Tao Daily or Sing Tao Evening News. In many of these works, Xu Xu engaged with the themes of exile and alienation and frequently explored fantastic or sublime experiences, as is the case in the novellas Bird Talk (鳥語, 1950) or The Other Shore (彼岸, 1951). Between 1956 and 1961, Xu Xu published his magnum opus, the bildungsroman River of Fury (江湖行) that, in 1972, was turned into a martial arts movie under the same name by Shaw Brothers Studio. In Hong Kong, Xu Xu also wrote copious amounts of literary criticism, edited a number of literary journals, and taught Chinese literature, eventually chairing the Chinese Department of Hong Kong Baptist University. According to Leung Ping-kwan, Xu Xu had a formative impact on a younger generation of Hong Kong writers and intellectuals. In 2018, an operatic version of Xu Xu's novella Ghost Love opened in Hong Kong.

== Portrait ==
- Xu Xu. A Portrait by Kong Kai Ming at Portrait Gallery of Chinese Writers (Hong Kong Baptist University Library).
