= Nyang'i language =

Endangered Kuliak language of Uganda

Nyang'i
- Nyangia
- Native to: Uganda
- Region: Nyangia Mountains
- Ethnicity: 9,600 Nyangia (2014 census)
- Native speakers: 1 semi-speaker (2017)
- Language family: Nilo-Saharan?: Kuliak; Nyang'i–Soo; Nyang'i

Language codes
- ISO 639-3: nyp
- Glottolog: nyan1313
- ELP: Nyang'i

Nyang'i (Nyangia) is the nearly extinct Kuliak language of the Nyangea hunter-gatherers of northeastern Uganda. The 15,000 Nyangia have shifted to speaking Karamojong.

The name is variously spelled Gyangiya, Ngangea, Ngiangeya, Nuangeya, Nyangeya, Nyangiya, Nyuangia, and is also known as Poren (Ngapore, Niporen, Nipori, Upale).

== History ==
According to Wiedemann & Nannyombi (2007), the Ik separated into three groups after having migrated from the north, likely modern-day Ethiopia. The three groups were: Tepes, Nyangia (who moved to the Nyang’i mountains), and Ik.

Driberg (1932) reported that the Nyangiya tribe had dwindled down to only a few hundred members who were forgetting their language even then, and preferred speaking “Dododh, a Nilo-Hamitic tongue akin to Karamojong”. Driberg states that Nyangiya is largely influenced by Dododh, and they also have a few words in common with their neighbors, the Acholi, who lived to the west. He suggests that the Acholi’s language is a purer form of Nyangiya. By 1975, it was reported by Heine that Nyang’i was only spoken by 100 people, and that most speakers had shifted to “Dodoth,” a dialect of Karamojong.

The Nyang'i and Thathi are believed to have worked together in their respective rituals of sacrifice to ensure abundant rainfall and the health and vigor of children and livestock. The Nyang'i are known as "people of the rain" because they sacrificed solely for rain to secure a good harvest. Nyang'i sacrifice sought to ensure a "period of peace," marked by rains and intensive cultivation creating a successful harvest. The Nyang'i people were known to use magic in their sacrifice.

=== Last remaining speaker ===
Beer (2017) reports that the last remaining semi-speaker of Nyang'i is Komol Isaach. Isaach is the only semi-speaker of Nyang'i out of an ethnic group of 9,630 people (2014 Uganda census). As the time of writing, Isaach lived in Puda village on the western slopes of the Nyangea Mountains in Lobalangit Subcounty, Kaabong District, northeastern Uganda, located just to the west of the Ik-speaking areas in the same district. Isaach's primary language is Karamojong, and he also has some limited knowledge of Swahili. His parents were both Ik speakers who had switched to speaking Karamojong when he was a child. Nyang'i data was collected by Beer (2017) from Isaach in 2012 and 2014. Since Isaach is the last remaining speaker, Beer's (2017) documentation of Nyang'i is salvage work on a "contracted idiolect" rather than an actual vital language (Beer 2017: 7).

The Okuti variety of Acholi is spoken to the west of the Nyangea Mountains (the Nyang'i area), while the Napore variety of Karamojong is spoken to the east. Ethnic Nyang'i people have shifted to speaking these languages.

== Grammar ==
According to Driberg, there is an absence of grammatical gender in the Nyang'i language.

== Vocabulary ==
- Swadesh list
- List of vocabulary (pages 604-5)
