= Timu Forest =

Forested area located in Uganda

Coordinates: 3°36′27″N 34°19′48″E

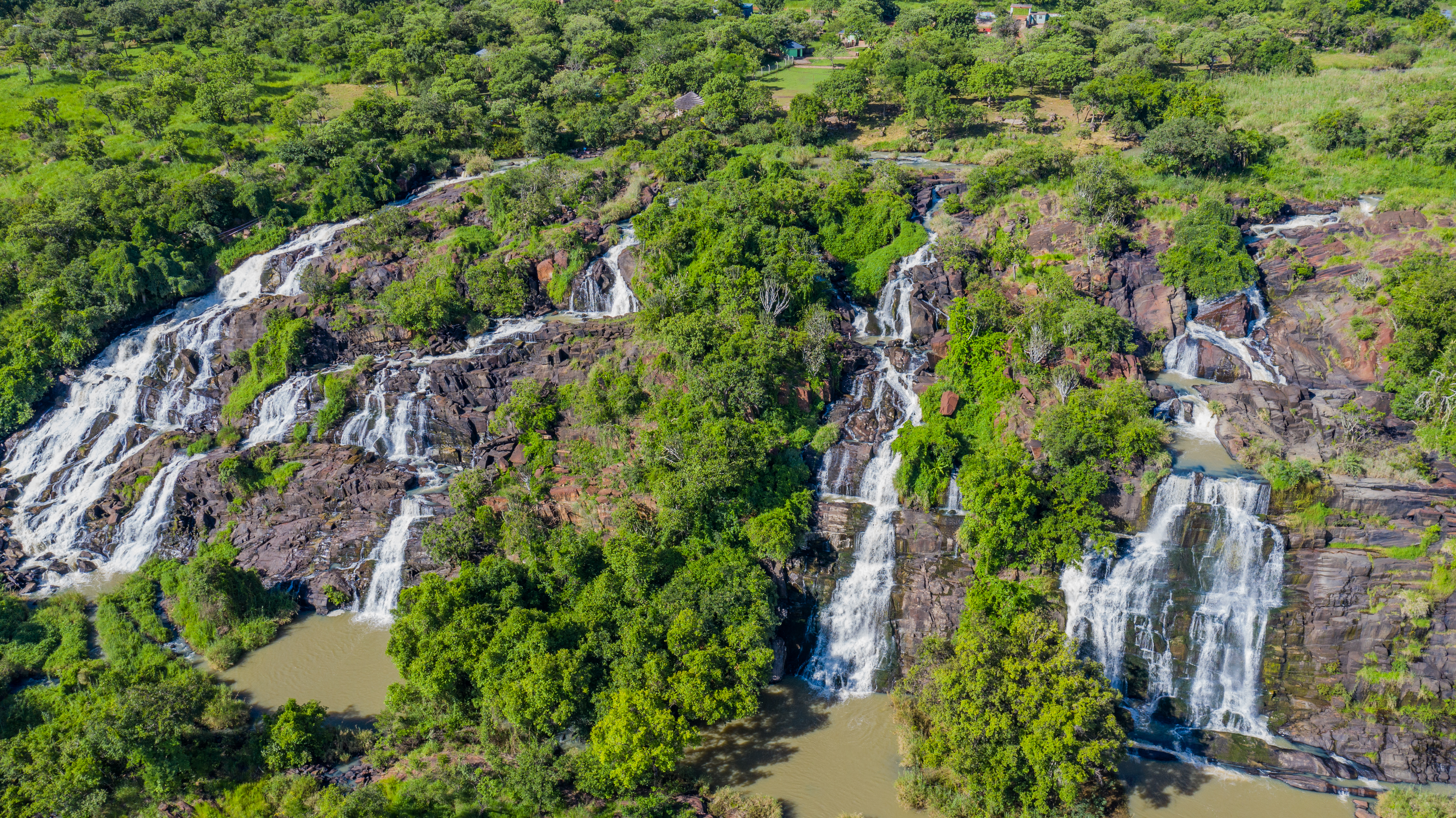
Aruu falls which originates from Timu forset

Timu Forest also known as Timu Central Forest Reserve, is a forested area located in Kaabong District, Northern Region, Uganda. The forest consists of Tropical savanna and has an elevation of 1,786 metres. It is located in the remote area of Kotide. Timu Forest is among the other sites proposed for nomination by UNESCO. The forest is known because Aruu Falls originated from it in Kaabong. The forest reserve borders Kidepo Valley National Park.

== Setting and structure ==
Timu Forest is surrounded by the Ik ethnic group in North Eastern Uganda. The tribe population is about 6,500 based on 2005 statistics, a people whose existence many Ugandans and the rest of the world are hardly aware of. It is mist-shrouded and densely forested mountains of northeastern Uganda.

== See also ==
- Aruu Falls
- Ik language
- Kidepo Valley National Park
- Bugungu Airstrip
