= Luciano Rebay =

Luciano Rebay (April 23, 1928 – July 14, 2014), known especially for his work on the poets Giuseppe Ungaretti, and Eugenio Montale, was one of the leading post-war critics of Italian literature in America.

Rebay had a long affiliation with Columbia University, where he was the Giuseppe Ungaretti Professor of Italian and, from 2005 until his death, the Giuseppe Ungaretti professor emeritus.

The following bibliography is a limited selection of his work. Rebay published many seminal articles on Montale, Ungaretti, and other Italian writers. He also translated many famous Italian poems into English. Audio recordings of his readings in the original Italian are still available.

== Bibliography ==
- Le origini della poesia di Giuseppe Ungaretti, Ed. di Storia e Letteratura, 1962
- Italian poetry : a selection from St. Francis of Assisi to Salvatore Quasimodo in Italian with English translation / selection, introduction, biographical and critical notes, translations by Luciano Rebay. -- New York : Dover, 1971
- Correspondance G. Ungaretti - J. Paulhan, Paris, Gallimard, 1989 (with J. Paulhan & [[:fr:Jean-Charles Vegliante|J.-Ch. Vegliante]]), Cahiers J. Paulhan
- Montale, Clizia e l'America, Luciano Rebay in Forum Italicum, Vol.16, n. 3, 171-202, New York, 1982.
- Vita d'un uomo: saggi e interventi/Giuseppe Ungaretti a cura di Mario Diacono e Luciano Rebay, Milano, Mondadori, 1974.
