= Raunaq Yar Khan =

Indian noble and socialite

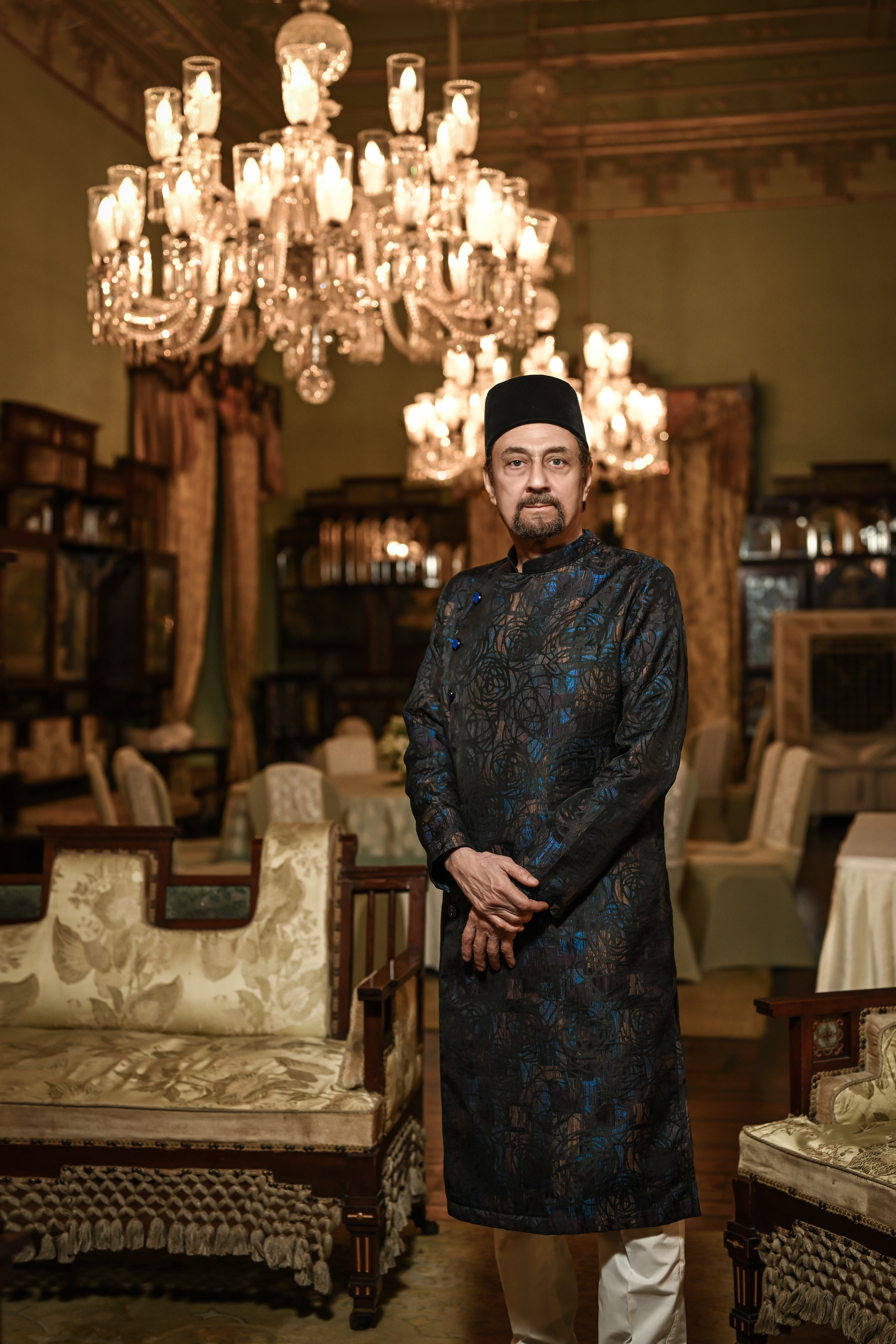
- Born: 13 April 1960 (age 66); Viqar-Ul-Umra Palace, Begumpet, Hyderabad
- Parent(s): Ahmad Yar Khan; Lateef Unnisa Begum

Raunaq Yar Khan (born 13 April 1960, at Viqar-Ul-Umra Palace, Begumpet, Hyderabad) is a Hyderabadi aristocratic noble and socialite.

== Early life and education ==
Yar Khan is connected to the Asaf Jahi dynasty through his maternal lineage, as he is the great-grandson of Nizam Mir Mahboob Ali Khan, the VIth Nizam of Hyderabad. His grandmother, Dawood Unnisa Begum, was the daughter of Nizam Mahboob Ali Khan and was married to the nobleman Nawab Muhammad Nazir ud-din Khan Bahadur, Nazir Nawaz Jang (also a descendant of the Vth Nizam, Afzal-ud-Daulah). Raunaq Yar Khan is the son of Lateef Unnisa Begum, their daughter. His father, Ahmad Yar Khan, and his mother, Lateef Unnisa Begum, are both of the Islamic faith.

His early education began at the Parsi Pre-primary School, which was established by close friends of the family and Parsi nobility.

Following his early education, Yar Khan attended Hyderabad Public School, Begumpet.

After completing his schooling, he pursued higher education in science. He served as a voluntary advisor to the Delhi Police between 1989 and 1999. Raunaq Yar Khan attended courses on Glass Fibre Reinforced Plastic technology at IIT Madras at Guindy, now Chennai, India. Eventually, he became involved in his father's manufacturing business, where he explored his interests in product design and innovation, particularly in fibreglass technology.

== Cultural contributions ==
His deep roots in the city have positioned him as an authentic representative of Hyderabad's distinctive "tehzeeb" (refined culture) and cosmopolitan spirit that developed through centuries of multicultural interaction under Asaf Jahi rule. His involvement in both Hindu celebrations like Holi and Islamic traditions promotes harmony among communities.

He owns an expansive 80-acre film facility situated on a 115-acre estate in Jubilee Hills. This facility, considered one of the largest in the city, features a unique man-made hill known as H.I.G.H. (Highest In Greater Hyderabad Hill) and has served as a location for film productions such as 'Rangasthalam'.
