= Mel Yoken =

American academic

Mel B. Yoken
- Born: 1939 (age 86–87); Fall River, Massachusetts, U.S.
- Occupation: Professor
- Known for: Collection of correspondence
- Awards: Legion of Honor (2018); Order of Academic Palms; Médaille de Vermeil du Rayonnement de la Langue Française

Academic background
- Education: University of Massachusetts Amherst (B.A.); Brown University (M.A.T.); Five College Consortium (Ph.D.)

Mel B. Yoken (born 1939) is an American academic and professor of French language and literature. He served as a professor at University of Massachusetts Dartmouth from 1966 until his retirement, when he received the title of Chancellor Professor Emeritus. Yoken has maintained correspondence with authors, politicians, and cultural figures, building a collection of letters housed at Brown University. In 2018, he received the Legion of Honor from France.

== Early life and education ==
Yoken was born in 1939 in Fall River, Massachusetts, to Albert Benjamin Yoken and Sylvia White. He graduated from B.M.C. Durfee High School in Fall River in 1956.

He received his bachelor's degree from the University of Massachusetts Amherst in 1960, followed by a Master of Arts in Teaching degree from Brown University in 1961. Yoken earned his Ph.D. in French language and literature in 1972 from the Five College Ph.D. Program, a collaborative program between Amherst College, Hampshire College, Mount Holyoke College, Smith College, and the University of Massachusetts Amherst. His dissertation was titled "Claude Tillier's Novelistic World."

== Academic career ==
Yoken taught French at Newton North High School in Newton, Massachusetts, from 1961 to 1964. He then taught at the University of Massachusetts Amherst while pursuing his Ph.D.

In 1966, Yoken joined the faculty at what was then called the Southeastern Massachusetts Technological Institute (later University of Massachusetts Dartmouth). During his 52-year association with the institution, he taught French language and literature and served as faculty advisor to The French Club, Table Française, and the Canadian Studies Program.

In the 1980s, Yoken established a Summer Language Institute, a program where students spent three weeks studying French language and culture at UMass Dartmouth followed by three weeks at the University of Montreal. This program was modeled after the Middlebury College Language School, which Yoken first attended in 1959.

== The Boivin Center ==
Yoken has been involved with the Boivin Center for French Language and Culture at UMass Dartmouth since its founding in 1985 by Omer E. and Laurette M. Boivin. He served as a board member from 1985 to 1999 and has been the Director since 1999.

The Boivin Center promotes French language and culture through scholarships, cultural programs featuring French and Francophone speakers, and documentation of French language influences in New England. The Center serves both university and regional levels.

== Letter collection ==
Yoken has assembled a collection of correspondence with various individuals from around the world. The collection began during his studies at Brown University in the 1960s, when he started writing letters to authors whose works he was studying. His first correspondence was with French author Jules Romains regarding his play "Knock, ou le triomphe de la médicine."

Over time, Yoken's correspondents expanded to include authors, politicians, actors, lawyers, judges, business leaders, military officers, media personalities, religious leaders, scientists, doctors, musicians, artists, and educators. The collection contains approximately 400,000 documents, which are housed at Brown University's John Hay Library, with some portions also held at UMass Dartmouth. In 2010, the John Hay Library exhibited selected letters from the collection.

== Publications ==
Yoken has published eight books:

- Claude Tillier (1976)
- Speech is Plurality (1978)
- Entretiens Québécois I (1986)
- The Letters of Robert Molloy, 1971-1977 (1989)
- Entretiens Québécois II (1990)
- Stowell Goding and France (1993)
- Entretiens Québécois III (1999)
- Breakthrough: Essays and Vignettes in Honor of John A. Rassias (2007)

He has also authored numerous articles in American, French, and Québécois publications. In recent years, Yoken published "A History of Letters," featuring selections from his vast correspondence collection, and "A History of Letters, Volume II."

== Honors and awards ==
Yoken has received numerous awards and honors throughout his career, including:

- Legion of Honor (2018) - France's highest distinction, presented by Consul General of France Valery Freland on behalf of French President Emmanuel Macron for his lifetime work in French language and literature
- Officer in the Order of Academic Palms (Ordre des Palmes académiques) - awarded by the French government
- Médaille de Vermeil du Rayonnement de la Langue Française - from the French Academy
- Robert Ludwig National Distinguished Leadership Award in Foreign Languages - from the New York State Foreign Language Association
- Mayoral citation for outstanding cultural achievements in Fall River
- Distinguished Alumnus Awards from B.M.C. Durfee High School and the University of Massachusetts Amherst
- Excellence in Teaching Awards at UMass Dartmouth

He has been elected Honorary Life Member in several organizations, including the Academy of American Poets, Fall River and New Bedford Public Libraries, Claire T. Carney Library Associates, American Association of Teachers of French (AATF), and Modern Language Association (MLA).

== Personal life ==
Yoken met his wife, Cindy, at an American Association of French Teachers conference. They have been married since 1976. Cindy Yoken is also a French teacher and collaborated with her husband on the Summer Language Institute at UMass Dartmouth.

Beyond his academic work, Yoken has had a longstanding involvement in radio broadcasting. Beginning in the 1950s, he hosted "Teen Party" on WALE in Fall River during his high school years. He later co-hosted a weekly show with Jean Caya Bancroft on WALE and subsequently WBSM (New Bedford), appearing approximately 450 times through 2005.
