= 1977 Nobel Prize in Literature =

Award

- Vicente Aleixandre
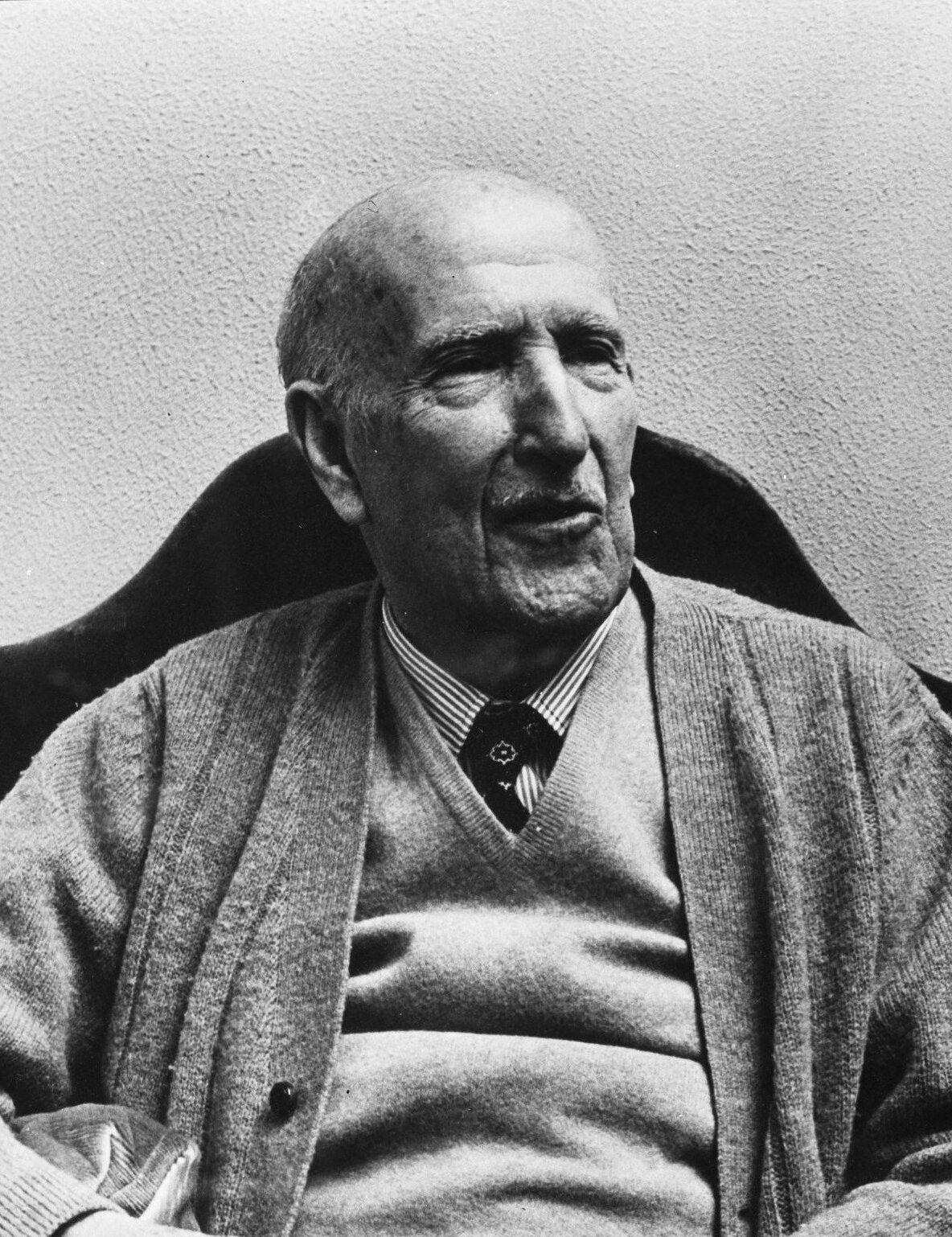
- "for a creative poetic writing, which illuminates man's condition in the cosmos and in present-day society, at the same time representing the great renewal of the traditions of Spanish poetry between the wars"
- Date: 6 October 1977 (announcement); 10 December 1977 (ceremony)
- Location: Stockholm, Sweden
- Presented by: Swedish Academy
- First award: 1901
- Website: Official website

The 1977 Nobel Prize in Literature was awarded to the Spanish poet Vicente Aleixandre (1898–1984) "for a creative poetic writing, which illuminates man's condition in the cosmos and in present-day society, at the same time representing the great renewal of the traditions of Spanish poetry between the wars." Aleixandre is the first Spanish author living in Spain to win the prize since before General Franco established his four-decade-long civil war of the 1930s because the 1956 recipient Juan Ramon Jimenez was a Spanish Civil War exile living in Puerto Rico.

== Laureate ==
Vicente Aleixandre belonged to the Generation of '27, an influential group of surrealist avant-garde poets that includes Guillén, Alberti, García Lorca and Prados. His debut as a poet came with Ámbito ("Ambit"), a poetry collection that appeared in 1928 but with less success. His distinctive style was developed later in the 1930s with the works Espadas como labios ("Swords as Lips", 1932), La destruccion o el amor ("Destruction or Love", 1935) and Sombra del paraiso ("Shadow of Paradise", 1944). With the outbreak of the Spanish Civil War, his poetic compositions underwent a gradual transition from lofty verses to simpler imagery. For a time, his poetic works were totally banned by the fascist regime but the ban was lifted in 1944. He lived a reclusive life throughout his writing career.

== Reactions ==
Little known outside the Spanish speaking world, Vicente Aleixandre was seen as a surprise choice by the Swedish Academy. Doris Lessing (awarded in 2007), Günter Grass (awarded in 1999) and the Turkish author Yasar Kemal had been mentioned as favourites to win the prize.

== Award ceremony speech ==
At the award ceremony in Stockholm on 10 December 1977, Karl Ragnar Gierow of the Swedish Academy said:

This year’s Nobel prizewinner in literature, Vicente Aleixandre, is hard to understand and in one way controversial. The latter may be due to the former. For even his devoted admirers offer varying interpretations of his poetry. It is doubtful if anyone has yet been able to sum it up properly, one reason being that fifty years after Aleixandre’s debut his writing still seems to be forging ahead. His two most remarkable collections of poems, the twin crowns of his career to date, appeared in 1968 (Poemas de la consumación) and 1974 (Diálogos del conocimiento).

On one point, however, all are agreed: Aleixandre’s place and importance in the spiritual life of Spain. In the history of literature he is part of the current that broke into Spanish poetry in the 1920s with unequalled breadth and force. One of the names of the vigorous avantgarde was the Pleiades. It is all the more suitable as no one with the naked eye can make out the correct number in the group of stars that we colloquially call The Seven Sisters. There are many more of them, and in the firmament of Spanish poetry these Pleiades are usually numbered at around twenty-five – a brilliant cluster of lyric talent. Among those who came to shine the brightest and the longest is Vicente Aleixandre.

Due to his health, Vicente Aleixandre was not able to be present at the award ceremony. The prize was accepted by his friend and colleague Justo Jorge Padron.

== Nobel lecture ==
Vicente Aleixandre's Nobel lecture was delivered in writing on 12 December 1977. In it Aleixandre wrote about his passion and his view of poetry:

The destiny of my life, its direction, was determined by a bodily weakness. I became seriously ill of a chronic complaint. I had to abandon all my other concerns, those which I might call corporal, and to retreat to the countryside far from my former activities. The vacuum thus created was soon invaded by another activity which did not call for physical exertion and could easily be combined with the rest that the doctors had ordered me to take. This unforgettable, all-conquering invasion was the practice of letters; poetry occupied to the full the gap in activity. I began to write with complete dedication and it was then, only then, that I became possessed by the passion which was never to leave me.

Hours of solitude, hours of creation, hours of meditation. Solitude and meditation gave me an awareness, a perspective which I have never lost: that of solidarity with the rest of mankind. Since that time I have always proclaimed that poetry is communication, in the exact sense of that word.

Poetry is a succession of questions which the poet constantly poses. Each poem, each book is a demand, a solicitation, an interrogation, and the answer is tacit, implicit, but also continuous, and the reader gives it to himself through his reading. It is an exquisite dialogue in which the poet questions and the reader silently gives his full answer.
