= Leon Samuel Roudiez =

American literary scholar (1917–2004)

Leon Samuel Roudiez (1917-2004) was an American literary scholar and professor emeritus and former head of the French department at Columbia University.

== Works ==
- French Fiction Revisited
- French Fiction Today: A New Direction
- Pouvoirs de l'horreur
- Powers of horror : an essay on abjection
- Revolution in poetic language
- Sēmeiōtichē : recherches pour une sémanalyse.
- Soleil noir
- Strangers to ourselves
- Tales of love
