= Archibald Tucker =

Archibald Norman Tucker (1904 – 1980) was a Cape Colony-born linguist specializing in Bantu languages. He earned his MA degree at the University of Cape Town. He did some study of Bantu languages in southern Africa and also made a trip to Sudan to study languages there. He worked as Linguistic Expert of non-Arabic languages for the Sudan Government from 1929 to 1931. He later moved to England in 1931. In London, Tucker studied under Alice Werner and Daniel Jones, earning his Ph.D. at University College London. Later he studied for a short time under Carl Meinhof in Hamburg.

He was hired to teach at the School of Oriental Studies, being named a Professor of East African Languages in 1951. During his 39 years teaching there, "a number of students passed through his hands; many of them were later to become experts in various languages. But it was for his research, and his publications resulting therefrom, that he will be chiefly remembered."

Tucker studied a number of African languages, including languages known as Dinka, Ganda, Kikuyu, Luo (Kenya and Tanzania), Masai, Lamba, Shona, Sukuma, Ntomba, Nyor, and comparative Eastern Sudanic languages. Tucker is known primarily for his two books published with Margaret Bryan: The Non-Bantu Languages of Northeastern Africa (1956) and, a decade later, Linguistic Analyses: The Non-Bantu Languages of North-Eastern Africa. According to Google Scholar, this monumental volume has been cited more than 460 times by other scholars.
