= Krishna Srinivas =

Indian writer (1913–2007)

Dr. Krishna Srinivas
- Born: 26 July 1913; Madras Presidency, British India
- Died: 14 December 2007 (aged 94); Chennai, Tamil Nadu, India
- Occupation: Poet
- Awards: 2004 Padma Bhushan

Dr. Krishna Srinivas (1913–2007) was an Indian writer of English literature, known for his spiritualistic poems. He was the president of the World Poetry Society Intercontinental (WPSI). The Government of India awarded him the Padma Bhushan, the third highest civilian award, in 2004.

== Biography ==
Krishna Srinivas, born on 26 July 1913 at Srirangam in the present day Tiruchirappalli district of the south Indian state of Tamil Nadu (then known as Madras Presidency), did his college education at University of Madras from where he graduated in 1932. He worked as a Clerk in Chettinad Bank for 6 years between 1936 and 1942. He got a job as a feature writer with AIR All India Radio in Delhi; He would later become the Assistant Director at AIR. However, he returned to Chennai to work as a freelance journalist till he founded a journal, POET, in 1960. Later, he was also involved in the formation of the World Poetry Society Intercontinental ad served as an editorial consultant to the International Who's Who In Poetry And Poets' Encyclopaedia, published by International Biographical Centre, Cambridge.

The Government of India awarded him the third highest civilian honor of the Padma Bhushan in 2004. He died on 14 December 2007, at the age of 94.

== Bibliography ==
- Krishna Srinivas (1970). Dance of dust. Industries Press. OCLC 564152.
- Krishna Srinivas (1972). Vedas in lyrics. Poet Press India. OCLC 8502127.
- Krishna Srinivas (1976). Great American world poets. Poet Press India. OCLC 3445316.
- Cēturāman̲, Vā. Mu; Krishna Srinivas (1981). Tamil poets today. Kaviarasan Publications : Sole selling agents, Tamilmani Puthaka Pannai. OCLC 12106199.
- Krishna Srinivas (1982). World poetry. World Poetry. OCLC 234005103.
