= Pierre-Henri Simon =

French intellectual and writer

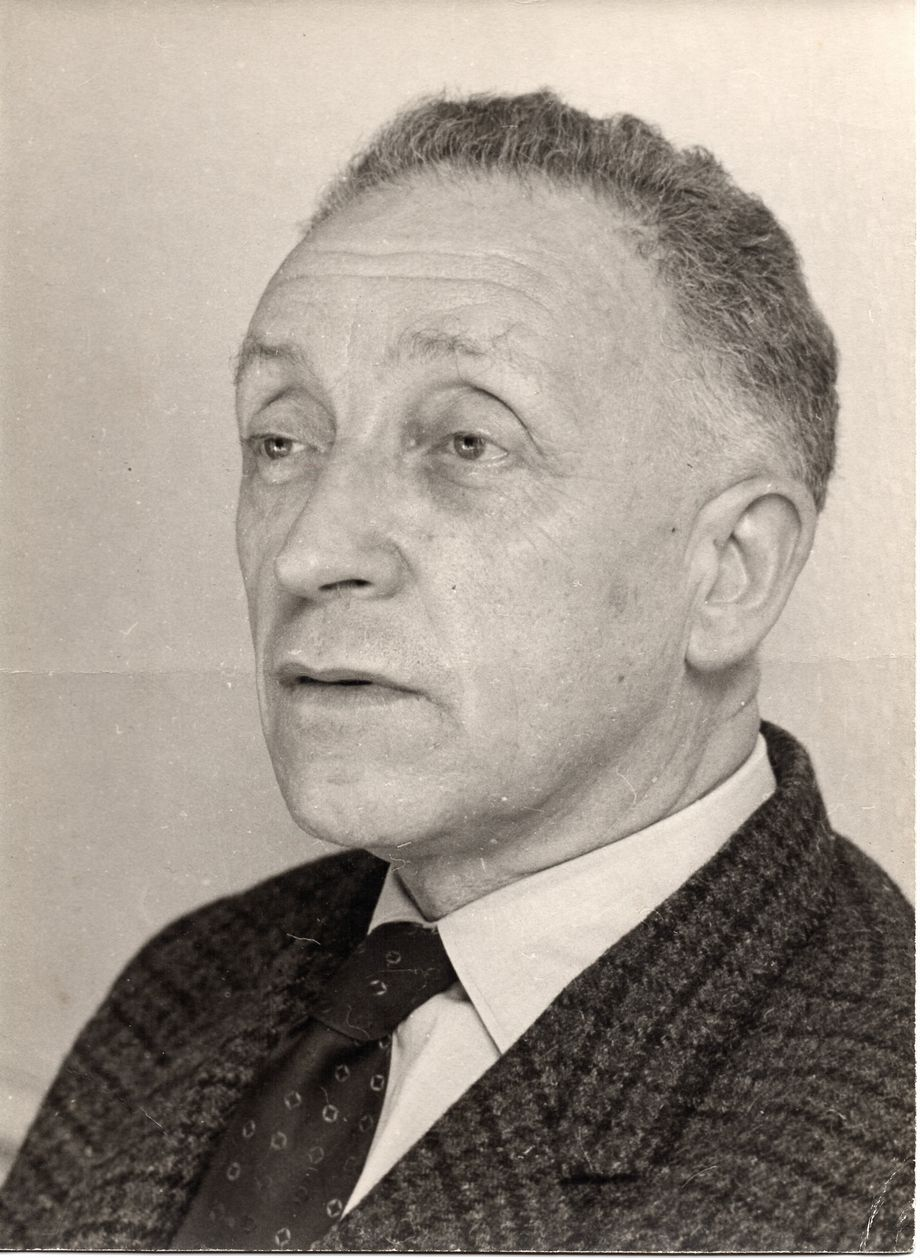

Pierre-Henri Simon (16 January 1903, Saint-Fort-sur-Gironde – 20 September 1972) was a French intellectual, literary historian, essayist, novelist, poet, and literary critic. He won the Prix Ève-Delacroix for Histoire d’un bonheur in 1965.

== Works ==
=== Essays ===
- Destins de la personne, 1935
- L'Église et la Révolution sociale, 1938
- L'homme en procès: Malraux, Sartre, Camus, Saint-Exupéry (1950)
- L'Europe a-t-elle une conscience ?, 1953
- Contre la torture, 1957 (Pamphlet)
- Ce que je crois, 1966

=== Novels ===
- Les Valentin, 1931
- L'Affût, 1946
- Les Raisins verts, 1950
- Celle qui est née un dimanche, 1952
- Les Hommes ne veulent pas mourir, 1953
- Portrait d'un officier, 1958
- Le Somnambule, 1960
- Histoire d'un bonheur, 1965
- Pour un garçon de vingt ans, 1967
- Questions aux savants, 1969
- La Sagesse du soir, 1971
- L'Homme et sa Vérité, 1972

=== Literary criticism ===
- Georges Duhamel ou le Bourgeois sauvé, 1947
- Mauriac par lui-même, 1953
- Histoire de la Littérature française du XXe siècle, 1956
- Théâtre et Destin, 1959
- Présence de Camus, 1961
- Le Domaine héroïque des lettres françaises, 1963

=== Theatre ===
- Le Ballet de Modène, 1968
