= Renzo Laurano =

Italian poet, translator and cultural organizer (1905–1986)

- Born: Luigi Asquasciati; 2 February 1905; Sanremo, Kingdom of Italy
- Died: 16 May 1986 (aged 81); Sanremo, Italy
- Occupations: Poet, translator, teacher, librarian

Luigi Asquasciati, better known by his pen name Renzo Laurano (2 February 1905 – 16 May 1986) was an Italian poet, translator, teacher, librarian and cultural organizer.

== Life and career ==
Born in Sanremo, Laurano studied at the University of Genoa, where he graduated in law in 1928 and in literature in 1934. He began publishing poetry in 1930 under the pseudonym Renzo Laurano, contributing to literary journals including Il Convegno. His poetry collection Chiara ride won the poetry competition of the Venice Biennale in 1934. He was also known for his translations of Provençal troubadour poetry.

During World War II, Laurano served as an officer in the Royal Italian Army and took part in the Italian campaign on the Eastern Front. After being reported dead during the Battle of the Don, he returned to Italy in 1943 and was awarded the Silver Medal of Military Valor.

After the war, Laurano worked as a teacher in technical schools in Imperia and Sanremo and directed the Sanremo Civic Library. He remained active in the literary life of Liguria, participating in and organizing literary prizes. In 1972 he was among the founders of the Club Tenco, an Italian organization dedicated to songwriting and popular music.

Laurano died in Sanremo in 1986.

== Works (selection) ==
- Chiara ride (1934)
- Gli Angeli di Melozzo da Forlì (1939)
- Calendari, la frana (1965)
