= Libero Bigiaretti =

Italian writer and poet

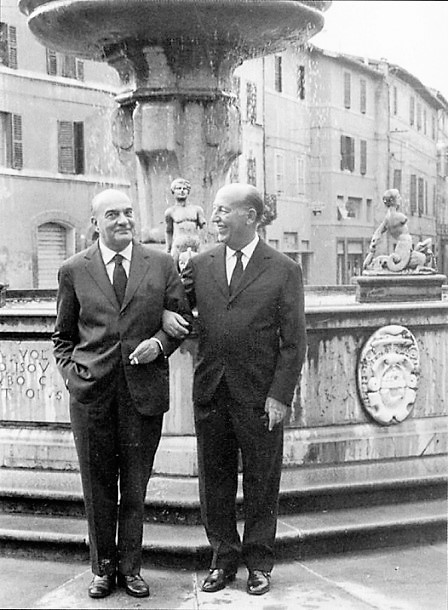
Libero Bigiaretti (left) with the publisher Valentino Bompiani in 1963

Libero Bigiaretti (16 May 1906 – 3 May 1993) was an Italian novelist, poet, translator and social critic. Apart from his literary works, he also was a journalist and a television presenter for the national public broadcasting company of Italy.

== Biography ==
Bigiaretti was born in Matelica, and worked as a journalist in Rome for several years. He started writing and publishing hermetic poetry, but pretty soon he concentrated on fiction, analyzing on problems of moral ambiguity of society. His novels and short stories often dealt with issues in the adolescence period, in particular focusing on the intersections between sensuality and morality. In addition, he wrote novels with the aim to unmask the hypocrisies of the bourgeois and political classes, concerned with the effects of social class on the morality of individuals as happen, notably, in the novel Il congresso, where he also presented the romantic theme of love through the story of Anna, the main character of that book. Bigiaretti was also known as television presenter conducting two programs on RAI: Dito puntato (1967) and Punto interrogativo (1971-1973).

== Selected works ==
=== Poetry ===
- Ore e stagioni, Roma, Libreria italiana, 1936.
- Care ombre, Roma, Augustea, 1940.
- Lungodora, Roma, De Luca, 1955.

=== Fiction ===
- Esterina, Roma, Lettere d'oggi, 1942.
- Incendio a Paleo, Roma, Cultura moderna, 1945.
- Un'amicizia difficile, Roma, De Luigi editore, 1945.
- Il villino, Milano, Garzanti, 1946.
- Un discorso d'amore, Milano, Garzanti, 1948.
- Carlone. Vita di un italiano, Milano, Garzanti, 1950.
- La scuola dei ladri, Milano, Garzanti, 1952.
- I figli, Firenze, Vallecchi, 1955.
- Disamore, Pisa, Nistri - Lischi 1956.
- Carte romane, Torino, E.R.I., 1958.
- Uccidi o muori, Firenze, Vallecchi, 1958.
- I racconti, Firenze, Vallecchi, 1961.
- Il Congresso, Milano, Bompiani, 1963.
- Le indulgenze, Milano, Bompiani, 1966.
- La controfigura, Milano, Bompiani, 1968.
- Il dissenso, Milano, Bompiani, 1969.
- Dalla donna alla luna, Milano, Bompiani, 1972.
- L'uomo che mangia Il leone, Milano, Bompiani, 1974.
- Due senza, Milano, Bompiani, 1979.
- Questa Roma, Roma, Newton & Compton Editori, 1981.
- Il viaggiatore, Milano, Rusconi, 1984.
- Abitare altrove, Milano, Firenze, Olschki, 1989; Milano, Bompiani, 1986.

=== Non-fiction ===
- Il dito puntato, Milano, Bompiani, 1967.
- Profili al tratto, Roma, Aracne, 2003.

=== Theatre ===
- Intervista con Don Giovanni, in "Il caffè politico e letterario", a. VI, n. 9, 1958, p. 1-13.
- Licenza di matrimonio, in "Il dramma", a. LXIV, n. 2, 1968, p. 62-64.

== Bibliography ==
- Healey, Robin (2019). Italian literature since 1900 in English translation : an annotated bibliography, 1929-2016. Toronto. ISBN 978-1-4875-1630-7. OCLC 1089195256.
