= Vittorio Vettori =

Italian poet (1920–2004)

Vittorio Vettori (1920 – 2004) was an Italian poet, writer and humanist, passionate spokesperson of ‘’Toscana Europea’’. He has been author of more than 200 volumes of poetry, narrative, philosophy, literary criticism and Dante essays translated into diverse languages.
