= List of Filipino Nobel laureates and nominees =

Filipino Nobel laureates and nominees

The Nobel Prize medal received by the laureates

The Nobel Prizes and the Nobel Memorial Prize in Economic Sciences are a set of awards given, according to Alfred Nobel's will, to "those who, during the preceding year, have conferred the greatest benefit to mankind."

Since its establishment, the prize has been awarded 609 times to 975 people and 27 organizations including one Filipino Nobel laureate – Rappler journalist Maria Ressa who received the Nobel Peace Prize in 2021 with Russian journalist Dmitry Muratov in recognition for their contributions to press freedom.

Before Ressa's win, Filipinos speculated multiple times when and who will be the first to win from their country. According to OPCW member Franz Ontal, winning the Nobel Prize is the last thing a Filipino could think of. Hence, the lack of Nobel laureates from the country.

The American news publication Foreign Policy has listed former Philippine president Corazon Aquino alongside Mahatma Gandhi, Eleanor Roosevelt, Ken Saro-Wiwa and Václav Havel as people who "never won the prize, but should have". Filipino journalist Romulo Virola noted Ramon Magsaysay, Manuel L. Quezon, Felipe Agoncillo, Concepción Felix, Josefa Llanes Escoda, Lope K. Santos, Trinidad Pardo de Tavera, Huseng Batute, Carlos Bulosan, and Zoilo Galang as "Filipinos who could have won the Nobel Prize if only they were nominated."

== Laureates ==
=== Overview ===
Despite having only one Nobel laureate, numerous Filipinos (both citizens within the country and living in overseas communities) and Philippine-based organizations were affiliated with laureate organizations of which they contributed largely and were active members at the time the organization was awarded:

- the Philippine Red Cross (Note: The Philippine Red Cross (founded in 1947 in Manila) was admitted as a bona fide member of the League of Red Cross and Red Crescent Societies on September 17, 1947.) being part of the 1963 Nobel laureate League of Red Cross Societies;
- the UNICEF Philippines (Note: Founded in 1948 in Manila, UNICEF Philippines became one of the first UNICEF offices established in Asia.) being part of the 1965 Nobel laureate UNICEF;
- the Philippine Campaign to Ban Landmines (Note: The Philippine Campaign to Ban Landmines (PCBL; founded in 1995 in Manila) is a member-organization of the International Campaign to Ban Landmines (ICBL), which won the Nobel Peace Prize in 1997, together with its coordinator Jody Williams.) being member of the 1997 Nobel laureate International Campaign to Ban Landmines;
- Vivian Talambiras-Cruz (Note: Talambiraz-Cruz (born on 2 December 1948 in Batangas City, Batangas, Philippines) was assistant to the IAEA Director Mohamed ElBaradei and a member of the International Atomic Energy Agency (IAEA) since the 1980s when both her boss and the said organization won the 2005 Nobel Peace Prize. Like all IAEA members, she was given a certificate by the Nobel Committee.) being part of the 2005 Nobel laureate International Atomic Energy Agency (IAEA);
- Jose Ramon Villarin, (Note: Villarin (born on 30 January 1960 in Manila), through his work on greenhouse gas emissions, was a member of the Intergovernmental Panel on Climate Change (IPCC) since the 1990s which, shared with U.S. Vice President Al Gore, received the 2007 Nobel Peace Prize.) Rex Victor Cruz, (Note: Cruz (born on 26 August 1956) was a member of the Intergovernmental Panel on Climate Change (IPCC) of the United Nations, being an expert in watershed management and climate change adaptation.) Juan M. Pulhin, Rosa T. Perez and Rodel Diaz Lasco being members and contributors of the 2007 Nobel laureate Intergovernmental Panel on Climate Change (IPCC);
- Franz Ontal et al. (Note: When the Organisation for the Prohibition of Chemical Weapons (OPCW) won the 2013 Nobel Peace Prize, ten Filipino activists, led by Franz Ontal (born on 27 April 1964 in Victorias, Negros Occidental, Philippines), crucially formed part in it. The members were Ontal, Criselda Javelosa van Dasler, Helen Andriessen, Gemma van Oudheusden-Voncoy, Jenniefer Balatbat, Allan Laroza, Roycelynne Reyes, Mary Ann Nieto-Schroor, Michael Conche, and Emily Castriciones.) being members of the 2013 Nobel laureate Organisation for the Prohibition of Chemical Weapons (OPCW);
- Jasmin Nario-Galace (Note: Dr. Jasmin Galace (born 5 November 1964) and Dr. Loreta Navarro–Castro (born 28 March 1948) were both members of the International Campaign to Abolish Nuclear Weapons (ICAN) when it won the 2017 Nobel Peace Prize.) and Loreta Navarro-Castro being members of the 2017 Nobel laureate International Campaign to Abolish Nuclear Weapons (ICAN).

=== Nobel laureates ===
As of 2021, there has only been one Filipino Nobel laureate:

Year	Image	Laureate	Born	Field	Citation
2021		Maria Ressa	2 October 1963 in Manila, Philippines	Peace	"for their efforts to safeguard freedom of expression, which is a precondition for democracy and lasting peace." (awarded together with Russian journalist Dmitry Muratov)

== Nominations ==
=== Nominees ===
Since 1929, Filipinos have started to receive nominations for the prestigious Swedish prize. The following list are the nominees with verified nominations from the Nobel Committee and recognized international organizations. There are also other purported nominees whose nominations are yet to be verified since the archives are revealed 50 years after, among them:

- For Physics: Casimiro del Rosario (1896–1982), Edgardo Escultura (Note: Prof. Escultura (born on 17 April 1936 in Sorsogon, Philippines) was purportedly nominated jointly with V. Lakshmikantha (1926–2012) and S. Leela (b. 1981), both Indian professor of physics and alumni of the Florida Institute of Technology, for the 2005 Nobel Prize in Physics for their collaboration in the development of the hybrid grand unified theory.) (born 1936), Diosdado Banatao (1946–2025), Henry J. Ramos (born 1950) and Reinabelle Reyes (born 1984)
- For Chemistry: Baldomero Olivera (born 1941), Lourdes J. Cruz (born 1942) and Lawrence Que Jr. (born 1949).
- For Physiology or Medicine: Abelardo Aguilar (1917–1993), Roseli Ocampo-Friedmann (1937–2005), Fe del Mundo (1911–2011), Ernesto Domingo (born 1930), Katherine Luzuriaga (born 1956), Nicanor Austriaco (born 1968) and Aldo Carrascoso (born 1978).
- For Literature: Lázaro Francisco (1898–1980), Severino Montano (1915–1980), León María Guerrero (1915–1982), Wilfrido Ma. Guerrero (1910–1995), Bienvenido Santos (1911–1996), Edilberto K. Tiempo (1913–1996), N. V. M. Gonzalez (1915–1999), Cirilo Bautista (1941–2018), Lualhati Bautista (1945–2023), Nick Carbó (1964–2024), Virgilio S. Almario (born 1944), Cristina Pantoja-Hidalgo (born 1944), Jessica Hagedorn (born 1949), Vince Gotera (born 1952), Jose Dalisay Jr. (born 1954), Luisa Igloria (born 1961) and Gina Apostol (born 1963).
- For Peace: Larry Itliong (1913–1977), Jose W. Diokno (1922–1987), Narciso G. Reyes (1914–1996), Cardinal Jaime Sin (1928–2005), Miriam Defensor Santiago (1945–2016), Benigno Aquino III (1960–2021), Sis. Mary John Mananzan (born 1937), Antonio Meloto (born 1950), Joan Carling (born 1963), Rodne Galicha (born 1979), Rural Missionaries of the Philippines (founded in 1969), Free Legal Assistance Group (founded in 1974), Task Force Detainees of the Philippines (founded in 1974), Karapatan Alliance Philippines (founded in 1995) and Philippine Ecumenical Peace Platform (founded in 2007).
- For Economics: Bernardo Villegas (born 1939), Raul Fabella (born 1949), Bruce Tolentino (born 1953) and Bp. Gilbert Garcera (born 1959).

Image	Nominee	Born	Died	Years Nominated	Citation	Nominator(s)
Physiology or Medicine
	Otto Schöbl (Note: Dr. Otto Schöbl was a bacteriologist and pathologist born and raised in Czechoslovakia, educated in Austria, engaged in research work in the United States and for the Philippine Government for almost 20 years, and died a Japanese citizen. His nomination for the 1929 Nobel Prize in Physiology was made while he was resident Chief of Philippine Bureau of Science in Manila.)	27 August 1877 in Zdice, Czech Republic	13 October 1938 in Tokyo, Japan	1929	"for his experimental work with frambosia which lead to knowledge of the etiology and pathogenesis of treponematous infections."	Proceso Gabriel (1887–1935); Philippines
	Otto Schöbl	27 August 1877 in Zdice, Czech Republic	13 October 1938 in Tokyo, Japan	1929	"for his experimental work with frambosia which lead to knowledge of the etiology and pathogenesis of treponematous infections."	Onofre Garcia (?); Philippines
	Proceso Gabriel	2 July 1887 in Santa Ana, Manila, Philippines	4 November 1935 in Manila, Philippines	1929	"for his contributions to the public health and the sanitary progress of the Philippines."	Dario del Val (?); Philippines
Literature
	Amado Yuzon	30 August 1906 in Guagua, Pampanga, Philippines	17 January 1979 in Quezon City, Philippines	1970	Poems for Screen Heroines (1949); The Citizen's Poems (1956); The Passion of Rizal, Poet and Martyr (1977)	Chung Tin-wen (?); Taiwan
	Amado Yuzon	30 August 1906 in Guagua, Pampanga, Philippines	17 January 1979 in Quezon City, Philippines	1970, 1973	Poems for Screen Heroines (1949); The Citizen's Poems (1956); The Passion of Rizal, Poet and Martyr (1977)	Emeterio Barcelon (1897–1978); Philippines
	Jose Garcia Villa	5 August 1908 in Manila, Philippines	7 February 1997 in New York City, United States	1971	Footnote to Youth (1933); Poems by Doveglion (1941); Have Come, Am Here (1942); Selected Poems and New (1958)	Alejandro Roces (1924–2011); Philippines
	Jose Garcia Villa	5 August 1908 in Manila, Philippines	7 February 1997 in New York City, United States	1971	Footnote to Youth (1933); Poems by Doveglion (1941); Have Come, Am Here (1942); Selected Poems and New (1958)	Pacita Icasiano-Habana (d. 2016) et al. (Note: "Pacita Icasiano-Habana led a group of professors, including Carmela Dayrit Ortigas and Asuncion Ordoñez Sison, from the Far Eastern University in nominating the poet Jose Garcia Villa.); Philippines
	Jose Garcia Villa	5 August 1908 in Manila, Philippines	7 February 1997 in New York City, United States	1973, 1974	Footnote to Youth (1933); Poems by Doveglion (1941); Have Come, Am Here (1942); Selected Poems and New (1958)	Purita Kalaw Ledesma (1914–2005); Philippines
	Nick Joaquin	4 May 1917; Paco, Manila, Philippines	29 May 2004; San Juan, Metro Manila, Philippines	1985	A Portrait of the Artist as Filipino (1950); The Woman Who Had Two Navels (1961); Cave and Shadows (1983)	
	Francisco Sionil Jose	3 December 1924; Rosales, Pangasinan, Philippines	6 January 2022; Makati, Metro Manila, Philippines	1985, 1994, 2006	The Rosales Saga (1962–1984); Ermita (1988); Viajero (1993); Three Filipino Women (1992)	
Peace
	Carlos P. Romulo	14 January 1898 in Camiling, Tarlac, Philippines	15 December 1985 in Manila, Philippines	1952	"for his contribution in international cooperation, in particular on questions on undeveloped areas, and as president for UN's 4th General Assembly."	Jose Maria Hernandez (1904–1982); Philippines
	United Poets Laureate International	founded on 30 September 1963 in Manila, Philippines		1967	"for promoting world brotherhood and peace through poetry"	Angel Macapagal (1917–1993); Philippines
	Marcelo Nubla	September 12, 1898 in Manila, Philippines	November 12, 1985 in the Philippines	1973	"for his identification of two evils, namely 'selfishness' and 'greed', and advocating for peace through elimination of these evils."	Jose Roy (1904–1986); Philippines
	Rafael M. Salas	August 7, 1928 in Bago, Negros Occidental, Philippines	March 4, 1987 in Washington, D.C., United States	1974	"for his role as the Executive Director of the United Nations Fund for Population Activities and as Assistant Secretary General of the United Nations, and for achieving that more than ninety developing countries recognized the importance of establishing population programs."	José Figueres Ferrer (1906–1990); Costa Rica
	Imelda Romualdez-Marcos	2 July 1929 in San Miguel, Manila, Philippines		1978	"for her valor in establishing diplomatic relations and peace dialogues with the Libyan dictator Mu'ammar Al-Qadhdhāfī."	Blas Ople (1927–2003); Philippines
	Imelda Romualdez-Marcos	2 July 1929 in San Miguel, Manila, Philippines		1978	"for her valor in establishing diplomatic relations and peace dialogues with the Libyan dictator Mu'ammar Al-Qadhdhāfī."	Ramon Fernandez (1916–1997); Philippines
	Aloysius Schwartz	18 September 1930 in Washington, D.C., United States	16 March 1992 in Manila, Philippines	1984, 1992	"for his ministry to thousands of poor children around the world."	Bob Dornan (born 1933); United States
	Corazon Cojuangco-Aquino	25 January 1933 in Paniqui, Tarlac, Philippines	1 August 2009 in Makati, Philippines	1987	"for her non-violent efforts to restore democracy in the Philippines."	Liv Aasen (1928–2005) Norway; Ruud Lubbers (1939–2018) Netherlands; Jaime Sin (1928–2005) Philippines; Lech Wałęsa (born 1943) Poland; Desmond Tutu (1931–2021) South Africa; Simone Veil (1927–2017) France; Raul Manglapus (1918–1999) Philippines
	Antonio Fortich, D.D.	11 August 1913 in Sibulan, Negros Oriental, Philippines	2 July 2003 in Bacolod, Negros Occidental, Philippines	1989	"for being a strong advocate of the rights of the poor and a critic of an unjust social economic system."	American Friends Service Committee; 21 members of the British Parliament
	Fidel V. Ramos	18 March 1928 in Lingayen, Pangasinan, Philippines	31 July 2022 in Makati, Philippines	1997	"for ending the long years of conflict between the Philippine government and the Moro Islamic Fronts through the 1996 Final Peace Agreement."	Organisation of Islamic Cooperation
	Nur Misuari	3 March 1939 in Tapul, Sulu, Philippines	—N/a	1997	"for ending the long years of conflict between the Philippine government and the Moro Islamic Fronts through the 1996 Final Peace Agreement."	Organisation of Islamic Cooperation
	Shay Cullen, S.S.C.M.E.	27 March 1943 in Dublin, Ireland	—N/a	2001, 2002, 2003, 2017	"for their commitment in protecting the rights of women and children and campaigning for freedom from sex slavery and human trafficking in the Philippines."	Nigel Griffiths (born 1955) United Kingdom; David Kilgour (1941–2022) Canada; Christa Nickels (born 1952) Germany; Bärbel Kofler (born 1967) Germany
	PREDA Foundation	founded in 1974 in Zambales, Philippines		2001, 2002, 2003, 2017	"for their commitment in protecting the rights of women and children and campaigning for freedom from sex slavery and human trafficking in the Philippines."	Nigel Griffiths (born 1955) United Kingdom; David Kilgour (1941–2022) Canada; Christa Nickels (born 1952) Germany; Bärbel Kofler (born 1967) Germany
	27 Filipino women (part of the 1000 PeaceWomen) (Note: The 27 Filipinas who formed part in the 1000 PeaceWomen were Maria Lorenzo "Binky" Dalupan-Palm (born 1952), Cecile Guidote-Alvarez (born 1943), Miriam "Dedet" Suacito (born 1959), Corazon "Dinky" Juliano-Soliman (1953–2021), Adoracion "Dory" Cruz-Avisado (1952–2016), Delia Ediltrudes "Duds" Santiago-Locsin (born 1939), Eliza Gahapon del Puerto (1957–2005), Hadja Bainon Karon (born 1953), Haydee Bofill Yorac (1941–2005), Irene Morada Santiago (born 1966), June Caridad Pagaduan-Lopez (born 1951), Loreta Navarro-Castro (born 1948), Sis. Mariani Dimaranan SFIC (1925–2005), Marilou Diaz-Abaya (1955–2012), Mary Lou Alcid (born 1955), Miriam Coronel-Ferrer (born 1959), Myla Jabilles Leguro (born 1968), Piang Tahsim Albar (born 1950), Sis. Puraperla "Pura" Sumangil, A.A. (born 1941), Ana Theresia "Risa" Hontiveros-Baraquel (born 1966), Seiko Bodios Ohashi (born 1960), Sis. Mary Soledad Perpiñan RGS (1937–2011), Teresa Banaynal Fernandez (born 1953), Teresita "Tessy" Ang-See (born 1949), Teresita "Ging" Quinto-Deles (born 1948), Zenaida Brigida "Briggs" Hamada-Pawid (born 1942), and Zenaida "Zeny" Tan Lim (born 1951).)	began in 2003 in Bern, Switzerland		2005	"in recognition of women's efforts and visibility in promoting peace all over the world."	Ruth-Gaby Vermont-Mangold (born 1941) Switzerland
	Leila de Lima	27 August 1959 in Iriga, Camarines Sur, Philippines	—N/a	2020, 2021	"for her campaign against extrajudicial killings and stand against dictatorial regimes."	Hakima el Haité (born 1963); Morocco
	Maria Ressa (Note: Maria Ressa was nominated jointly with the Reporters Without Borders and Committee to Protect Journalists by Norwegian labor leader Jonas Gahr Støre for the 2021 Nobel Peace Prize. The politician recognized Ressa for her critical coverage of President Rodrigo Duterte's administration.)	2 October 1963 in Manila, Philippines	—N/a	2021	"for her brave commitments to free expression, human dignity and democratic government in reporting on the authoritarian Duterte administration."	Jonas Gahr Støre (born 1960); Norway
	Victoria Tauli-Corpuz (Note: Tauli-Corpuz, together with the Ecuadorian activist Juan Carlos Jintiach, was included in the Peace Research Institute Oslo's shortlist of Nobel Peace Prize worthy candidates for the year 2023.)	19 October 1952 in Besao, Mt. Province, Philippines	—N/a	2023	"for her non-violent struggle to protect and strengthen the rights of indigenous peoples"	Peace Research Institute Oslo

=== Nominators ===
The following Philippines-based organizations and Filipino individuals have nominated various candidates, local and international, for the Nobel Prize.

Image	Nominee	Born	Died	Nominator	Motivation	Year Nominated
Physiology or Medicine
	Onofre Garcia	—N/a	—N/a	Otto Schöbl (1877–1938); Czechoslovakia	"for his experimental work with frambosia which lead to knowledge of the etiology and pathogenesis of treponematous infections."	1929
	Proceso Gabriel	2 July 1877 in Manila, Philippines	4 November 1935 in Manila, Philippines	Otto Schöbl (1877–1938); Czechoslovakia	"for his experimental work with frambosia which lead to knowledge of the etiology and pathogenesis of treponematous infections."	1929
	Dario Del Val	—N/a	—N/a	Proceso Gabriel (1877–1935); Philippines	"for his contributions to the public health and the sanitary progress of the Philippines."	1929
Literature
	Manuel Briones	1 January 1893 in Mandaue, Cebu, Philippines	29 September 1957 in Manila, Philippines	Ramón Menéndez Pidal (1869–1968); Spain	Crónicas Generales de España (1898); Orígenes del Español (1926); Flor Nueva de Romances Viejos (1928); La España del Cid (1929); Romancero Hispánico: Teoría e Historia (1953)	1956
	Jesús Castañon, O.P.	23 July 1897 in Lena, Asturias, Spain	13 December 1969 in Quezon City, Philippines	Ramón Menéndez Pidal (1869–1968); Spain	Crónicas Generales de España (1898); Orígenes del Español (1926); Flor Nueva de Romances Viejos (1928); La España del Cid (1929); Romancero Hispánico: Teoría e Historia (1953)	1956
	Emeterio Barcelón	1897 in Santa Cruz, Manila, Philippines	1978 in Philippines	Amado Yuzon (1906–1979); Philippines	Poems for Screen Heroines (1949); The Citizen's Poems (1956); The Passion of Rizal, Poet and Martyr (1977)	1970, 1973
	Emeterio Barcelón	1897 in Santa Cruz, Manila, Philippines	1978 in Philippines	Chen Min-hwa (born 1934); Taiwan	Daisy (1967); Through the Crystal Glass (1970); Qin Window Poetry Collection (1971); As Dawn Whistles Over the Sea (1973)	1974
	Emeterio Barcelón	1897 in Santa Cruz, Manila, Philippines	1978 in Philippines	José María Pemán (1897–1981); Spain	El Divino Impaciente (1933); Almoneda (1938); La Casa (1947); Callados Como Muertos (1952); La Viudita Naviera (1960)	1974
	Alejandro Roces	13 July 1924 in Manila, Philippines	23 May 2011 in Manila, Philippines	Jose Garcia Villa (1908–1997); Philippines; United States	Footnote to Youth (1933); Poems by Doveglion (1941); Have Come, Am Here (1942); Selected Poems and New (1958)	1971
	Pacita Icasiano-Habana	—N/a	17 August 2016 in the Philippines	Jose Garcia Villa (1908–1997); Philippines; United States	Footnote to Youth (1933); Poems by Doveglion (1941); Have Come, Am Here (1942); Selected Poems and New (1958)	1971
	Purita Kalaw Ledesma	2 February 1914 in Manila, Philippines	29 April 2005 in Manila, Philippines	Jose Garcia Villa (1908–1997); Philippines; United States	Footnote to Youth (1933); Poems by Doveglion (1941); Have Come, Am Here (1942); Selected Poems and New (1958)	1973, 1974
	Academia Filipina de la Lengua Española	25 July 1924; Makati, Metro Manila, Philippines		José María Pemán (1897–1981); Spain	El Divino Impaciente (1933); Almoneda (1938); La Casa (1947); Callados Como Muertos (1952); La Viudita Naviera (1960)	1974
Peace
	Jose Maria Hernandez	19 June 1904 in the Philippines	14 July 1982 in the Philippines	Carlos P. Romulo (1898–1985); Philippines	"for his contribution in international cooperation, in particular on questions on undeveloped areas, and as president for UN's 4th General Assembly."	1952
	Guadalupe Forés-Ganzon	8 July 1908 in Baliuag, Bulacan, Philippines	1985 in the Philippines	Hermann Gmeiner (1919–1986); Austria	"for founding SOS Children's Villages, wherein care for and education of homeless orphans obliterate racial and cultural barriers, making them useful members of our future society."	1964
	Angel Macapagal	2 October 1917 in Lubao, Pampanga, Philippines	6 November 1993 in Los Angeles, California, United States	United Poets Laureate International (founded 1963); Philippines	"for promoting world brotherhood and peace through poetry."	1967
	Amadeo Cruz	30 October 1903 in Navotas, Philippines	25 December 1971 in Manila, Philippines	Spurgeon M. Keeny (1893–1988); United States	"for his dedication and concern for the welfare of humanity, devotedly working towards bettering the state of life for peoples in the world and contributed greatly to the fight against diseases and later population control in Asia."	1971
	Carlos P. Romulo	14 January 1898 in Camiling, Tarlac, Philippines	15 December 1985 in Manila, Philippines	Norman Cousins (1915–1990); United States	"for his contributions to the cause of world peace, international law and the welfare of humanity and his constant efforts to right impractices and prevent suffering."	1972
	Carlos P. Romulo	14 January 1898 in Camiling, Tarlac, Philippines	15 December 1985 in Manila, Philippines	Pearl S. Buck (1892–1973); United States	"for her work with her foundation Pearl S. Buck Foundation that was setting up opportunity centers for children in capitals in Southeast Asia."	1973
	Gil Puyat	1 September 1907 in Manila, Philippines	23 March 1980 in Makati, Philippines	Pearl S. Buck (1892–1973); United States	"for her establishment of the Pearl S. Buck Foundation which, through opportunity centers seeks to gather all orphan Amerasians to house them, educate them and teach them skills."	1973
	Jose Roy	19 July 1904 in Moncada, Tarlac, Philippines	14 March 1986 in Manila, Philippines	Marcelo Nubla (1898–1984?); Philippines	"for his identification of two evils, namely 'selfishness' and 'greed', and advocating for peace through elimination of these evils."	1973
	Blas Ople	3 February 1927 in Hagonoy, Bulacan, Philippines	14 December 2003 in Taoyuan, Taiwan	Imelda R. Marcos (born 1929); Philippines	"for her valor in establishing diplomatic relations and peace dialogues with the Libyan dictator Mu'ammar Al-Qadhdhāfī."	1978
	Ramon Fernandez Sr.	16 February 1916 in Libon, Albay, Philippines	25 March 1997 in Manila, Philippines	Imelda R. Marcos (born 1929); Philippines	"for her valor in establishing diplomatic relations and peace dialogues with the Libyan dictator Mu'ammar Al-Qadhdhāfī."	1978
	Raul Manglapus	20 October 1918 in Manila, Philippines	25 July 1999 in Muntinlupa, Philippines	Corazon Cojuangco-Aquino (1933–2009); Philippines	"for her non-violent efforts to restore democracy in the Philippines."	1987
	Antonio Paris	—N/a	—N/a	Henry Reeve Brigade (founded in 2005); Cuba	"for their altruistic work carried out in 2020 to save more than 10,000 patients who contracted the COVID-19 virus in 38 foreign countries and to serve another 355,000 people affected by the pandemic."	2021
	Edgar Erice	15 June 1960 in Quezon City, Philippines	—N/a	AirLabs (founded in 2017); United Kingdom	"for their fight against air pollution and to the significant role played by science in developing clean-air technologies for good health and well-being worldwide."	2022

== See also ==
- List of Asian Nobel laureates
