= 1971 Nobel Prize in Literature =

- Pablo Neruda
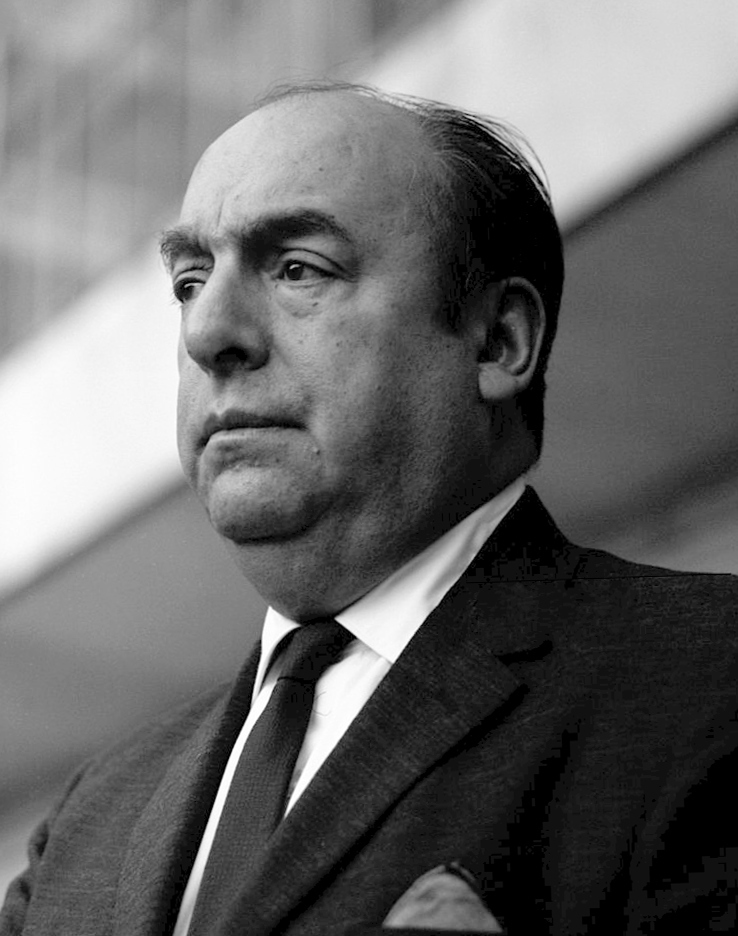
- "for a poetry that with the action of an elemental force brings alive a continent's destiny and dreams."
- Date: 21 October 1971 (announcement); 10 December 1971 (ceremony)
- Location: Stockholm, Sweden
- Presented by: Swedish Academy
- First award: 1901
- Website: Official website

The 1971 Nobel Prize in Literature was awarded to the Chilean politician and poet Pablo Neruda (1904–1973) "for a poetry that with the action of an elemental force brings alive a continent's destiny and dreams." Neruda became the second Chilean Nobel laureate in Literature after Gabriela Mistral in 1945.

== Laureate ==
Pablo Neruda is known for his surrealist poems and historical epics which touches political, human and passionate themes. Among his well known works which are read throughout the world include Veinte poemas de amor y una canción desesperada ("Twenty Love Poems and a Song of Despair", 1924), which established him as a prominent poet and an interpreter of love and erotica, and Cien Sonetos de Amor ("100 Sonnets of Love", 1959). A diplomat, his official journey in Asia affected him strongly, which is reflected in two volumes of poems titled Residencia en la tierra ("Residence on Earth", 1933 and 1935). Neruda's Communist sympathies reflect in his work Canto General (1939), an epic poem about the whole South American continent.

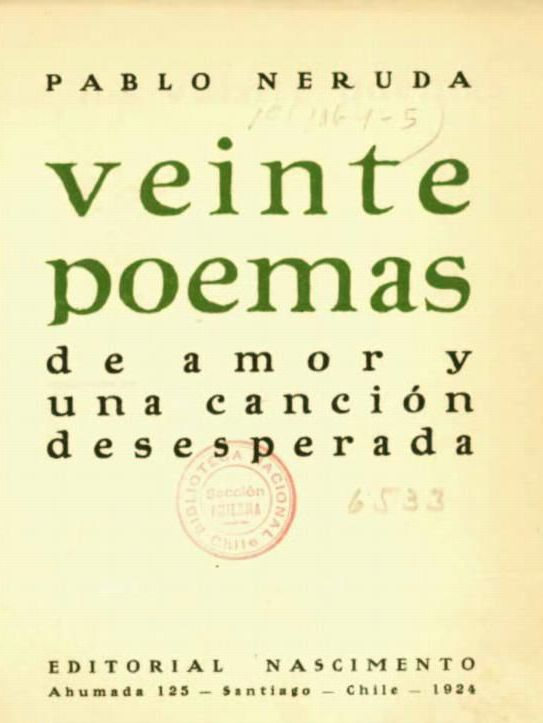
Neruda's Twenty Love Poems and a Song of Despair (1924)

== Deliberations ==
=== Nominations ===
In 1971, the Swedish Academy received 137 nominations for 91 writers. Neruda received 25 nominations since 1956 and received two nominations which eventually led to him being awarded the 1971 prize. Among the shortlist were Neruda, W. H. Auden, Patrick White (awarded in 1973), André Malraux and Eugenio Montale (awarded in 1975).

The most number of nominations were for Jorge Luis Borges and Montale, both receiving 6 nominations. André Malraux was the nominee who had been nominated for most years (22 years) up to 1971. 25 of the nominees were nominated first-time, among them Elie Wiesel (awarded the 1986 Nobel Peace Prize), José García Villa, James Baldwin, Arno Schmidt, Georges Schéhadé, William Golding (awarded in 1983) and Richard E. Kim. The oldest nominee was Jacques Maritain (aged 89) while the youngest was Richard E. Kim (aged 39). Peruvian novelist José María Arguedas was nominated posthumously by the professor of Scandinavian languages, Elie Poulenard (1901–1985) from University of Strasbourg. Estonian poet Marie Under was the only female nominee.

The authors André Billy, C. D. Broad, Walter Van Tilburg Clark, Daniel de la Vega, Nels F. S. Ferré, Peter Fleming, Claude Gauvreau, Gaito Gazdanov, A. P. Herbert, Philippe Hériat, Raicho Hiratsuka, Anthony Ludovici, Ogden Nash, Allan Nevins, Reinhold Niebuhr, Naoya Shiga, Kenneth Slessor, Juhan Smuul, Aleksandr Tvardovsky, Frank Underhill, Charles Vildrac, Waldo Williams, and Philip Wylie died in 1971 without having been nominated for the prize. The Indian novelist Tarasankar Bandyopadhyay and Dutch writer Simon Vestdijk died months before the announcement.

Official list of nominees and their nominators for the prize
No.	Nominee	Country	Genre(s)	Nominator(s)
1	Edward Albee (1928–2016)	United States	drama	Dieter Schaller (1929–2003)
2	Jorge Amado (1912–2001)	Brazil	novel, short story	Laurent Versini (1932–2021)
3	Jerzy Andrzejewski (1909–1983)	Poland	novel, short story	Eeva Kilpi (1928–)
4	Louis Aragon (1897–1982)	France	novel, short story, poetry, essays	Jean Gaudon (1926–2019)
5	José María Arguedas (1911–1969) (posthumous nomination)	Peru	novel, short story, poetry, essays	Elie Poulenard (1901–1985)
6	Wystan Hugh Auden (1907–1973)	United Kingdom; United States	poetry, essays, screenplay	Erik Frykman (1905–1980); Barbara Hardy (1924–2016)
7	Riccardo Bacchelli (1891–1985)	Italy	novel, drama, essays	Giacomo Devoto (1897–1974); Beniamino Segre (1903–1977)
8	James Baldwin (1924–1987)	United States	novel, short story, essays, poetry, drama	Jacob Louis Mey (1926–2023)
9	Tarasankar Bandyopadhyay (1898–1971)	India	novel, short story, drama, essays, autobiography, songwriting	Krishna Kripalani (1907–1992)
10	Mykola Bazhan (1904–1983)	Ukraine	poetry, essays	Omeljan Pritsak (1919–2006)
11	Saul Bellow (1915–2005)	Canada; United States	novel, short story, memoir, essays	Jara Ribnikar (1912–2007)
12	Jorge Luis Borges (1899–1986)	Argentina	poetry, essays, translation, short story	Manuel Durán (1925–2020); Yakov Malkiel (1914–1998); Andri Peer (1921–1985); Heinrich Bihler (1918–2017); Christopher Ricks (1933–); Raimundo Lida (1908–1979)
13	Jawad Boulos (1900–1982)	Lebanon	history, essays	Camille Aboussouan (1919–2013)
14	Heinrich Böll (1917–1985)	West Germany	novel, short story	Karl Theodor Hyldgaard-Jensen (1917–1995); Herbert Morgan Waidson (1916–1988); Gustav Korlén (1915–2014)
15	Michel Butor (1926–2016)	France	poetry, novel, essays, translation	Karl Ragnar Gierow (1904–1982)
16	Elias Canetti (1905–1994)	Bulgaria; United Kingdom	novel, drama, memoir, essays	Keith Spalding (1913–2002)
17	Alejo Carpentier (1904–1980)	Cuba	novel, short story, essays	Henri Peyre (1901–1988)
18	Lord David Cecil (1902–1986)	United Kingdom	biography, history, essays	Leslie Poles Hartley (1895–1972)
19	Aimé Césaire (1913–2008)	Martinique	poetry, drama, essays	Karl Ragnar Gierow (1904–1982)
20	André Chamson (1900–1983)	France	novel, essays	Giannēs Koutsocheras (1904–1994); Guy Nairay (1914–1999); Armand Lunel (1892–1977); Pierre Emmanuel (1916–1984); Wladimir d'Ormesson (1888–1973); Marcel Achard (1899–1974)
21	Fazıl Hüsnü Dağlarca (1914–2008)	Turkey	poetry	Yaşar Nabi Nayır (1908–1981)
22	Tsendiin Damdinsüren (1908–1986)	Mongolia	poetry, essays, novel, translation	Walther Heissig (1913–2005)
23	Salvador de Madariaga (1886–1978)	Spain	essays, history, law, novel	Kázmér Géza Werner (1900–1985)
24	Henry de Montherlant (1895–1972)	France	essays, novel, drama	Anders Österling (1884–1981)
25	Paul Demiéville (1894–1979)	Switzerland; France	essays, translation	Martin Gimm (1930–)
26	Lawrence Durrell (1912–1990)	United Kingdom	novel, short story, poetry, drama, essays	Haydn Trevor Mason (1929–2018)
27	Friedrich Dürrenmatt (1921–1990)	Switzerland	drama, novel, short story, essays	Werner Betz (1912–1980); Karl Siegfried Guthke (1933–)
28	Rabbe Enckell (1903–1974)	Finland	short story, poetry	Carl-Eric Thors (1920–1986); Eyvind Johnson (1900–1976)
29	Salvador Espriu (1913–1985)	Spain	drama, novel, poetry	Manuel Durán (1925–2020); Antoni Comas (1931–1981)
30	Romain Gary (1914–1980)	Lithuania; France	novel, essays, literary criticism, screenplay	Walther Hinz (1906–1992)
31	Maurice Genevoix (1890–1980)	France	novel, essays	Yves Gandon (1899–1975)
32	William Golding (1911–1993)	United Kingdom	novel, poetry, drama, essays	Inna Koskenniemi (1923–1995); Meta Mayne Reid (1905–1991)
33	Günter Grass (1927–2015)	West Germany	novel, drama, poetry, essays	Henry Caraway Hatfield (1912–1995); Erich Ruprecht (1906–1997); Lauri Seppänen (1924–2009); Manfred Windfuhr (1930–)
34	Graham Greene (1904–1991)	United Kingdom	novel, short story, autobiography, essays	Mary Renault (1905–1983)
35	Jorge Guillén (1893–1984)	Spain	poetry, literary criticism	Manuel Durán (1925–2020); Andri Peer (1921–1985)
36	Paavo Haavikko (1931–2008)	Finland	poetry, drama, essays	Eeva Kilpi (1928–)
37	William Heinesen (1900–1991)	Faroe Islands	poetry, short story, novel	Sven Møller Kristensen (1909–1991); Dag Strömbäck (1900–1978); Arthur Arnholtz (1901–1973)
38	Vladimír Holan (1905–1980)	Czechoslovakia	poetry, essays	Eyvind Johnson (1900–1976)
39	Eugène Ionesco (1909–1994)	Romania; France	drama, essays	Karl Ragnar Gierow (1904–1982)
40	Roman Jakobson (1896–1982)	Russia; United States	essays	Jean Dubois (1920–2015)
41	Eyvind Johnson (1900–1976)	Sweden	novel, short story	Pär Lagerkvist (1891–1974)
42	Younghill Kang (1898–1972)	North Korea; United States	novel, memoir, drama	Robert Payne (1911–1983)
43	Erich Kästner (1899–1974)	West Germany	poetry, screenplay, autobiography	Kázmér Géza Werner (1900–1985)
44	Richard Eun Kook Kim (1932–2009)	North Korea; United States	novel, short story	Baek Cheol (1908–1985)
45	Arthur Koestler (1905–1983)	Hungary; United Kingdom	novel, autobiography, essays	Georges Matoré (1908–1998)
46	Miroslav Krleža (1893–1981)	Croatia; Yugoslavia	poetry, drama, short story, novel, essays	Gunnar Jacobsson (1918–2001)
47	Karl Krolow (1915–1999)	West Germany	poetry, essays, translation	Emil Ernst Ploss (1925–1972)
48	Philip Larkin (1922–1985)	United Kingdom	poetry, novel, essays	Jørgen Læssøe (1924–1993)
49	Siegfried Lenz (1926–2014)	West Germany	novel, short story, essays, drama	Karl Ragnar Gierow (1904–1982)
50	Väinö Linna (1920–1992)	Finland	novel	Eeva Kilpi (1928–); Eyvind Johnson (1900–1976)
51	Compton Mackenzie (1883–1972)	United Kingdom	novel, short story, drama, poetry, history, biography, essays, literary criticism, memoir	Magne Oftedal (1921–1985)
52	Archibald MacLeish (1892–1982)	United States	poetry, essays, drama, law	William Scovil Anderson (1927–2022)
53	Hugh MacLennan (1907–1990)	Canada	novel, essays	Lawrence Lande (1906–1998)
54	André Malraux (1901–1976)	France	novel, essays, literary criticism	Ernest Lee Tuveson (1915–1996); Kauko Aatos Ojala (1919–1987); Lloyd James Austin (1915–1994); Henri Peyre (1901–1988); John Henry Raleigh (1920–2001)
55	Jacques Maritain (1882–1973)	France	philosophy	Charles Dédéyan (1910–2003)
56	Harry Martinson (1904–1978)	Sweden	poetry, novel, drama, essays	Arthur Arnholtz (1901–1973)
57	Miquel Melendres i Rué (1905–1974)	Spain	essays, theology, poetry, memoir	Antoni Griera (1887–1973)
58	Arthur Miller (1915–2005)	United States	drama, screenplay, essays	Petronella O'Flanagan (–); Andri Peer (1921–1985)
59	Vilhelm Moberg (1898–1973)	Sweden	novel, drama, history	Anders Österling (1884–1981)
60	Eugenio Montale (1896–1981)	Italy	poetry, translation	Carlo Bo (1911–2001); Marco Scovazzi (1923–1971); Uberto Limentani (1913–1989); Paul Renucci (1915–1976); Lanfranco Caretti (1915–1995); Henri Peyre (1901–1988)
61	Alberto Moravia (1907–1990)	Italy	novel, literary criticism, essays, drama	Aimo Sakari (1911–2001); Jacques Robichez (1914–1999)
62	Vladimir Nabokov (1899–1977)	Russia; United States	novel, short story, poetry, drama, translation, literary criticism, memoir	Jens Pauli Heinesen (1932–2011); Bernard Tervoort (1920–2006)
63	Mikhail Naimy (1889–1988)	Lebanon	poetry, drama, short story, novel, autobiography, literary criticism	Joseph Bassila (–); Toufic Fahd (1923–2009)
64	Pablo Neruda (1904–1973)	Chile	poetry	Henri Peyre (1901–1988); Josephine Miles (1911–1985)
65	Fritiof Nilsson Piraten (1895–1972)	Sweden	short story, novel, essays, law	Bertil Ejder (1916–2005)
66	Ezra Pound (1885–1972)	United States	poetry, essays	Hans Galinsky (1909–1991)
67	Evaristo Ribera Chevremont (1890–1976)	Puerto Rico	poetry	Ernesto Juan Fonfrías (1909–1990)
68	Yannis Ritsos (1909–1990)	Greece	poetry, songwriting	Eyvind Johnson (1900–1976); Per Wästberg (1933–)
69	Alain Robbe-Grillet (1922–2008)	France	novel, short story, essays, screenplays	Henry Olsson (1896–1985)
70	Tadeusz Rózewicz (1921–2014)	Poland	poetry, drama, translation	Gunnar Jacobsson (1918–2001)
71	Hans Ruin (1891–1980)	Finland; Sweden	philosophy	Arthur Arnholtz (1901–1973)
72	Georges Schéhadé (1905–1989)	Lebanon	poetry, drama, novel	Camille Aboussouan (1919–2013)
73	Arno Schmidt (1914–1979)	West Germany	novel, short story, biography, essays	Lars Gyllensten (1921–2006)
74	Léopold Sédar Senghor (1906–2001)	Senegal	poetry, essays	Karl Ragnar Gierow (1904–1982)
75	Robert Shih [Shi Jieyun] (1926–1983)	China	essays	Étienne Lamotte (1903–1983)
76	Claude Simon (1913–2005)	France	novel, essays	Henry Olsson (1896–1985)
77	Charles Percy Snow (1905–1980)	United Kingdom	novel, essays	Sylvère Monod (1921–2006)
78	Zaharia Stancu (1902–1974)	Romania	poetry, novel, philosophy, essays	Karl Ragnar Gierow (1904–1982)
79	Marie Under (1883–1980)	Estonia	poetry	Algirdas Landsbergis (1924–2004)
80	Simon Vestdijk (1898–1971)	Netherlands	novel, poetry, essays, translation	Karl Ragnar Gierow (1904–1982)
81	José García Villa (1908–1997)	Philippines; United States	poetry, essays	Alejandro Roces (1924–2011); Pacita Habana (–2016); professors from Far Eastern University
82	Gerard Walschap (1898–1989)	Belgium	novel, drama, essays	Richard Declerck (1899–1986); William Pée (1903–1986); Marcel Coole (1913–2000)
83	Mika Waltari (1908–1979)	Finland	short story, novel, poetry, drama, essays, screenplay	Inna Koskenniemi (1923–1995)
84	Sándor Weöres (1913–1989)	Hungary	poetry, translation	Áron Kibédi Varga (1930–2018)
85	Patrick White (1912–1990)	Australia	novel, short story, drama, poetry, autobiography	Esko Pennanen (1912–1990); Leslie Rees (1905–2000)
86	Elie Wiesel (1928–2016)	Romania; United States	memoir, essays, novel, drama	Gerd Høst-Heyerdahl (1915–2007)
87	Thornton Wilder (1897–1975)	United States	drama, novel, short story	Wolfgang Clemen (1909–1990); Julián Marías (1914–2005); William Summers Anderson (1919–2021)
88	Tennessee Williams (1911–1983)	United States	drama, novel, screenplay, short story, poetry	Kázmér Géza Werner (1900–1985)
89	Henry Williamson (1895–1977)	United Kingdom	novel, short story	Petronella O'Flanagan (–)
90	Angus Wilson (1913–1991)	United Kingdom	novel, short story, essays	Gerhard Nickel (1928–2015)
91	Carl Zuckmayer (1896–1977)	West Germany	drama, screenplay	Herbert Penzl (1910–1995); Alexander Lernet-Holenia (1897–1976)

=== Prize Decision ===
In 1971, the Nobel committee shortlisted Patrick White (awarded in 1973), W.H. Auden, André Malraux and Eugenio Montale (awarded in 1975) along with Pablo Neruda. The academy's archives later revealed in 2022 that Neruda was almost denied the Nobel Prize because of his "communist tendencies" and odes to Stalin. While Anders Österling of the Nobel committee praised Neruda's "poetic natural power and dynamic vitality", he questioned whether the increasingly dominant communist tendency in his poetry is compatible with the purpose of the Nobel prize. In the archives, Österling wrote that "a writer's way of thinking – whether Marxist, syndicalist, anarchist or something else – belongs to his free right. However, Neruda is fully politically involved, including through his hymns to Stalin and other purely propagandistic achievements. On that basis, I have reservations about his candidacy, without, however, wanting to firmly reject it in advance..." Österling had previously spoken out against the candidacy both of Ezra Pound and Samuel Beckett, but was eventually persuaded with Neruda's and Beckett's merits later awarded them the prize, but not Pound.

Committee members Lars Gyllensten, Henry Olsson and Artur Lundkvist all recommended Neruda and Patrick White as the main contenders for the prize. Karl Ragnar Gierow listed Neruda as his first proposal and W.H. Auden as his second proposal, noting a "little marked difference" between the order of the proposals. Österling found Auden to be the most recommendable among the candidates, followed by Montale and Patrick White. André Malraux's candidacy was dismissed by the committee as his best work was thought to be too far back in time. Following their meeting on 16 September 1971 the Nobel committee reported that Neruda had the strongest support in the committee, followed by Auden and White with an equal number of votes.

== Reactions ==
Pablo Neruda had been one of the favourites to be awarded the Nobel prize in Literature in 1971. Other possible winners speculated about in the media included Graham Greene, Henry Miller and Lawrence Durrell.

The choice of Neruda was controversial for political reasons. It was questioned if Neruda's far-left communism was compatible with the purpose of the Nobel prize, but it was widely agreed that Neruda deserved the prize for his literary achievements.

Bo Strömstedt, cultural editor of the newspaper Expressen, suggested ironically that Neruda's appointment to the Paris embassy might have been decisive factor for him being awarded the Nobel Prize in Literature, describing it as "Pension for Diplomats". In an interview, he pointed out that three laureates in the last decade had been diplomats: Saint-John Perse of France, Giorgos Seferis of Greece and Miguel Ángel Asturias of Guatemala. "I call it a Nobel old-age pension for diplomats," he said. "I think Pablo Neruda is a great poet and a greater artist than Patrick White but like choices that come too late, it's a bit dull. I'm for choosing younger persons who are in the midst of their work."

In his home country Chile, the awarding of the Nobel prize to Neruda was widely celebrated. Commenting on the political criticism, Neruda said at a press conference in Stockholm before the award ceremony: "The Nobel prize in literature could have been awarded to other Latin American writers who represent other beliefs. That would not have been wrong by the Swedish Academy but I don't think it would have received the same response and joy among our people as this choice has done."

== Award ceremony ==
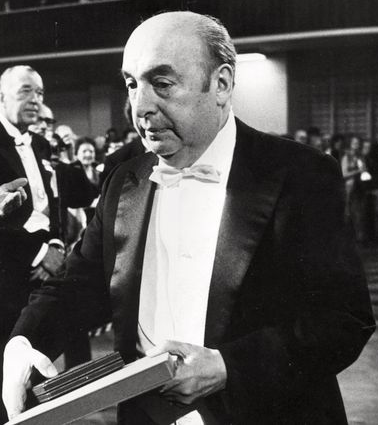
Nobel laureate Pablo Neruda receiving his medal and diploma (December 10, 1971).

At the award ceremony in Stockholm on 10 December 1971, Karl Ragnar Gierow of the Swedish Academy said:

The spirit of Nobel’s will tells us what he had in mind [about the prize is to reward work in “an ideal direction”]. The contribution must be one which will benefit mankind. But any work of art worthy of the name does this, so does any literary work with a serious purpose, and so far that matter does that which aims at nothing more serious than raising a healthy laugh. The clause in the will has so much to say that it leaves us without a clear message. One of the few cases, however, where it does take on a definite meaning is this year’s winner of the Nobel Prize for Literature: Pablo Neruda. His work benefits mankind precisely because of its direction. It is my impossible task here to indicate this in a few words. To sum up, Neruda is like catching a condor with a butterfly net. Neruda, in a nutshell, is an unreasonable proposition: the kernel bursts the shell.

Nevertheless, one can do something to describe this kernel. What Neruda has achieved in his writing is community with existence. This sounds simple, and is perhaps our most difficult problem. He himself, in one of his New Elemental Odes, has defined it in the formula: harmony with Man and the Earth. The direction in his work, the direction which can so justly be called ideal, is indicated by the path which has brought him to this harmony. (...)

we shall follow with high expectations this remarkable poetry, which with the overflowing vitality of an awakening continent resembles one of its rivers, growing all the mightier and more majestic the closer it approaches the estuary and the sea.

== Nobel lecture ==
Pablo Neruda delivered a Nobel lecture entitled "Towards the Splendid City" on 13 December 1971, in which he raises some great points about the craft of writing poetry and the poet's relation to society. Neruda expressed: "I believe that poetry is an action, ephemeral or solemn, in which there enters as equal partners solitude and solidarity, emotion and action, the nearness to oneself, the nearness to mankind and to the secret manifestations of nature."
