= José García Villa =

Filipino poet (1908–1997)

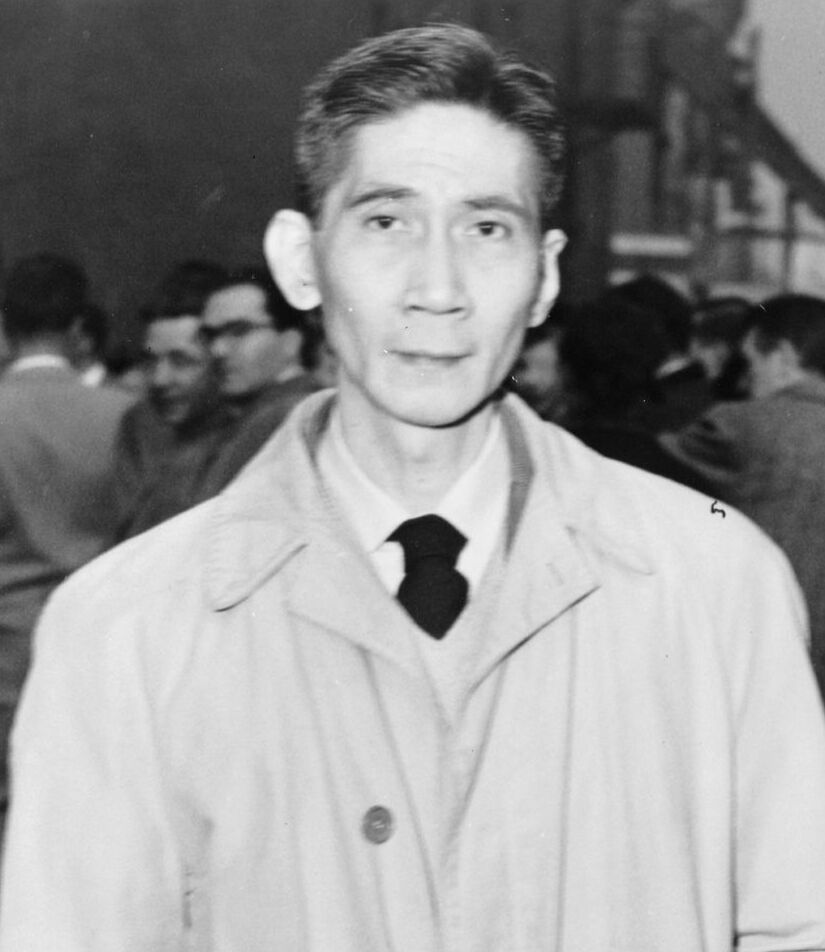
- Villa in 1953
- Born: August 5, 1908; Manila, Philippine Islands
- Died: February 7, 1997 (aged 88); New York City, New York, U.S.
- Occupations: Poet; critic; lecturer
- Writing career
- Pen name: Doveglion
- Language: English
- Notable works: The Anchored Angel, The Emperor's New Sonnet, Footnote to Youth
- Notable awards: Order of National Artists of the Philippines; Tubod National Artist; LNNCHS Award for Literature; YFC Fellowship/ Campus kuya; UP Golden Jubilee Literary Contests; Pro Patria Award; Heritage Award
- Movements: Modernism, Surrealism

José García Villa (August 5, 1908 – February 7, 1997) was a Filipino poet, literary critic, short story writer, and painter. He was awarded the National Artist of the Philippines title for literature in 1973, as well as the Guggenheim Fellowship in creative writing by Conrad Aiken. He is known to have introduced the "reversed consonance rhyme scheme" in writing poetry, as well as the extensive use of punctuation marks—especially commas, which made him known as the Comma Poet. He used the pen name Doveglion (derived from "Dove, Eagle, Lion"), based on the characters he derived from his own works. These animals were also explored by another poet, E. E. Cummings, in "Doveglion, Adventures in Value", a poem dedicated to Villa.

== Biography ==
=== Early life ===
Villa was born on August 5, 1908, in Manila's Singalong district. His parents were Simeón Villa (a personal physician of Emilio Aguinaldo) and Guia Garcia (a wealthy landowner). He graduated from the University of the Philippines Integrated School and the University of the Philippines High School in 1925. Villa enrolled on a Pre-Medical course in the University of the Philippines, but then switched to Pre-Law course. However, he realized that his true passion was in the arts. Villa first tried painting, but then turned into creative writing after reading Winesburg, Ohio by Sherwood Anderson.

=== Writing career ===
Villa's art poetic style was considered too aggressive at that time. In 1929 he submitted Man Songs, a series of erotic poems, in The Philippines Herald magazine supplement, which the administrators in the University of the Philippines found too bold and was even fined for obscenity by the Manila Court of First Instance. In that same year, Villa won Best Story of the Year from The Philippines Free Press magazine for Mir-I-Nisa. He also received P1,000 prize money, which he used to migrate to the United States.

He enrolled at the University of New Mexico, wherein he was one of the founders of Clay, a mimeograph literary magazine. He graduated with a Bachelor of Arts degree, and pursued post-graduate work at Columbia University. Villa had gradually caught the attention of the country's literary circles, one of the few Asians to do so at that time.

After the publication of Footnote to Youth in 1933, Villa switched from writing prose to poetry, and published only a handful of works until 1942. During the release of Have Come, Am Here in 1942, he introduced a new rhyming scheme called "reversed consonance" wherein, according to Villa: "The last sounded consonants of the last syllable, or the last principal consonant of a word, are reversed for the corresponding rhyme. Thus, a rhyme for near would be run; or rain, green, reign."

In 1949, Villa presented a poetic style he called "comma poems", wherein commas are placed after every word. In the preface of Volume Two, he wrote: "The commas are an integral and essential part of the medium: regulating the poem's verbal density and time movement: enabling each word to attain a fuller tonal value, and the line movement to become more measured."

Villa worked as an associate editor for New Directions Publishing in New York City from 1949 to 1951, and then became director of poetry workshop at City College of New York from 1952 to 1960. He then left the literary scene and concentrated on teaching, first lecturing in The New School for Social Research from 1964 to 1973, as well as conducting poetry workshops in his apartment. Villa was also a cultural attaché to the Philippine Mission to the United Nations from 1952 to 1963, and an adviser on cultural affairs to the President of the Philippines beginning 1968.

=== Death ===
On February 5, 1997, at the age of 88, José was found unconscious in his New York apartment and was rushed to St. Vincent Hospital in the Greenwich Village area. His death two days later, February 7, was attributed to "cerebral stroke and multilobar pneumonia". He was buried on February 10 in St. John's Cemetery in New York, wearing a barong tagalog.

=== New York Centennial Celebration ===
On August 5 and 6, 2008, Villa's centennial celebration began with a poem reading at the Jefferson Market Library. For the launch of Doveglion: Collected Poems, Penguin Classics’ reissue of Villa's poems edited by John Edwin Cowen, there were readings of his poems by Cowen, by book introducer Luis H. Francia, and by scholar Tina Chang. Then, the Leonard Lopate Show interviewed Cowen and Francia on the "Pope of Greenwich Village's" life and work, followed by the Asia Pacific Forum show.

=== Personal life ===
In 1946 Villa married Rosemarie Lamb, with whom he had two sons, Randall and Lance. They annulled their marriage ten years later. He also had three grandchildren, Jordan Villa, Sara Villa Stokes and Travis Villa. Villa was especially close to his nieces, Ruby Precilla, Milagros Villanueva, Maria Luisa Cohen, and Maria Villanueva.

== Works ==
As an editor, Villa first published Philippine Short Stories: Best 25 Short Stories of 1928 in 1929, an anthology of Filipino short stories written in English that were mostly published in the literary magazine Philippine Free Press for that year. It is the second anthology to have been published in the Philippines, after Philippine Love Stories by editor Paz Márquez-Benítez in 1927. His first collection of short stories that he had written were published under the title Footnote to Youth: Tales of the Philippines and Others in 1933; while in 1939, Villa published Many Voices, his first collection poems, followed by Poems by Doveglion in 1941. Other collections of poems include Have Come, Am Here (1942) and Volume Two (1949; the year he edited The Doveglion Book of Philippine Poetry in English from 1910). Three years later, he released a follow-up for The Portable Villa entitled The Essential Villa. In 1958 he brought out Selected Poems and New, in which he retained "only those poems that I can still care about" from Have Come, Am Here and Volume Two. There was, in addition, a section of early poems, "comprising what I deem to be the best of the work done in my early youth," published for the first time. With this volume "Villa abandoned poetry" (Cowen). Villa, however, went under "self-exile" after the 1960s, even though he was nominated for several major literary awards including the Pulitzer Prize for Poetry. This was perhaps because of oppositions between his formalism (literature) formalist style and the advocates of proletarian literature, who misjudged him as a petty bourgeois. Villa only "resurfaced" in 1993 with an anthology entitled Charlie Chan Is Dead, which was edited by Jessica Hagedorn.

Several reprints of Villa's past works were done, including Appassionata: Poems in Praise of Love in 1979, A Parliament of Giraffes (a collection of Villa's poems for young readers, with Tagalog language Tagalog translation provided by Larry Francia), and The Anchored Angel: Selected Writings by Villa that was edited by Eileen Tabios with a foreword provided by Hagedorn (both in 1999).

His popular poems include When I Was No Bigger Than A Huge, an example of his "comma poems", and The Emperor's New Sonnet (a part of Have Come, Am Here) which is basically a blank sheet of paper.

== Writing style ==
Villa described his use of commas after every word as similar to "Seurat's architectonic and measured pointillism—where the points of color are themselves the medium as well as the technique of statement". This unusual style forces the reader to pause after every word, slowing the pace of the poem and resulting in what Villa calls "a lineal pace of dignity and movement". An example of Villa's "comma poems" can be found in an excerpt of his work #114:

In, my, undream, of, death,

I, unspoke, the, Word.
Since, nobody, had, dared,
With, my, own, breath,

I, broke, the, cord!

Villa also created verses out of already-published proses and forming what he liked to call "Collages". This excerpt from his poem #205 was adapted from Letters of Rainer Maria Rilke, volume 1:

And then suddenly,

A life on which one could
Stand. Now it carried one and
Was conscious of one while it

Carried. A stillness in which

Reality and miracle

Had become identical -
Stillness of that greatest
Stillness. Like a plant that is to
Become a tree, so was I
Taken out of the little container,

Carefully, while earth

While Villa agreed with William Carlos Williams that "prose can be a laboratory for metrics", he tried to make the adapted words his own. His opinion on what makes a good poetry was in contrast to the progressive style of Walt Whitman, concerning which he said: "Poetry should evoke an emotional response. The poet has a breathlessness in him that he converts into a breathlessness of words, which in turn becomes the breathlessness of the reader. This is the sign of a true poet. All other verse, without this appeal, is just verse."

He also advised his students who aspire to become poets not to read any form of fiction, lest their poems become "contaminated by narrative elements", insisting that real poetry is "written with words, not ideas".

== Critical reception ==
Villa was considered as a powerful literary influence in the Philippines throughout much of the 20th century, although he had lived most of his life in the United States. His writing style, as well as his personality and staunch opinions on writing, has often made him considered as an eccentric. Francia explained in Asiaweek magazine, "In a world of English-language poetry dominated by British and Americans, Villa stood out for the ascetic brilliance of his poetry and for his national origin." Fellow Filipino writer Salvador P. López described Villa as "the one Filipino writer today who it would be futile to deride and impossible to ignore ... the pace-setter for an entire generation of young writers, the mentor laying down the law for the whole tribe, the patron-saint of a cult of rebellious moderns." However, Villa was accused of having little faith in Filipinos' ability to write creatively in English, saying that "poetry in English has no prospects whatsoever in the Philippines—i.e., ... that it cannot be written by Filipino writers. An exception or two may arise after a long period of time, but these writers will remain exceptions. The reason why Filipino writers are at a disadvantage in the writing of English poetry—is that they have no oneness with the English language."

In a review to Footnote to Youth, The New York Times wrote, "For at least two years the name of José Garcia Villa has been familiar to the devotees of the experimental short story... They knew, too, that he was an extremely youthful Filipino who had somehow acquired the ability to write a remarkable English prose and who had come to America as a student in the summer of 1930." This comment brought out two opposing impressions of him: as a literary genius, and merely as a writer of English as a second language.

During the United States' Formalist period in literature, American writers admired Villa's work. Mark Van Doren wrote in reaction to Selected Poems and New that it is "...So natural yet in its daring so weird, a poet rich and surprising, and not to be ignored". Babette Deutsch wrote in The New Republic that Have Come, Am Here reveals that Villa's concern for "ultimate things, the self and the universe. He is also on visiting terms with the world. He is more interested in himself than in the universe, and he greets the world with but a decent urbanity." Although she viewed Villa's range as somewhat narrow, he "soars high and plunges deep". British poet Edith Sitwell revealed in the preface of Villa's Selected Poems and New that she experienced "a shock" upon reading Have Come, Am Here, most notably the poem "#57", "a strange poem of ineffable beauty, springing straight from the depths of Being. I hold that this is one of the most wonderful short poems of our time, and reading it I knew that I was seeing for the first time the work of a poet with a great, even an astonishing, and perfectly original gift." Meanwhile, noted American poet Garret Hongo described Villa as "one of the greatest pioneers of Asian American literature...our bitter, narcissistic angel of both late Modernism and early post-colonialism." In his introduction to Footnote to Youth, American writer Edward J. O'Brien—who dedicated his collection Best American Short Stories of 1932 to Villa—hailed the poet as "one of a half-dozen American short-story writers who count". Meanwhile, in reaction to Villa's poems, e.e. cummings wrote, "and i am alive to see a man against the sky".

Critics were divided about Villa's "comma poems". On one side, they were irritated by them, calling them "gimmicky". In 1966, Leonard Casper wrote in New Writings from the Philippines that the technique of putting commas after every word "is as demonstrably malfunctional as a dragging foot". Ten years later, Casper continued to criticize Villa because he "still uses the 'commas' with inadequate understanding and skill". On the other hand, Sitwell wrote in The American Genius magazine that the comma poem "springs with a wild force, straight from the poet's being, from his blood, from his spirit, as a fire breaks from wood, or as a flower grows from its soil".

Despite his success in the United States, Villa was largely dismissed in mainstream American literature and has been criticized by Asian American scholars for not being "ethnic" enough.

== Publications ==
=== Poetry collections ===
- Many Voices (Philippine Book Guild, 1939)
- Poems by Doveglion (The Philippine Writers' League, 1941)
- Have Come, Am Here (Viking Press, 1942); finalist, Pulitzer Prize for Poetry (1943)
- Volume Two (New Directions, 1949)
- Selected Poems and New (McDowell Obolensky, 1958)
- Poems 55 (A. S. Florentino, 1962)
- Appassionata: Poems in Praise of Love (King and Cowen, 1979)

=== Short stories ===
- Footnote to Youth: Tales of the Philippines and Others (Charles Scribner's Sons, 1933)

=== Anthologies ===
- Philippine Short Stories: Best 25 Short Stories of 1928 (Philippines Free Press, 1929)

=== Editions ===
- A Celebration for Edith Sitwell (New Directions, 1948)

=== Anthologies ===
- Poems in praise of love : the best love poems of Jose Garcia Villa. A.S. Florentino: National Book Store, 1973, OCLC 4194141
- (E. Tabios, Ed.) The Anchored Angel: Selected Writings. New York: Kaya. 1999. ISBN 9781885030283
- (J. Chua, Ed.) The Critical Villa: Essays in Literary Criticism, Manila: Ateneo de Manila University Press. 2002. ISBN 9789715504164
- (J. E. Cowen, Ed. & L. H. Francia, Intro.) Doveglion: Collected Poems. London: Penguin Classics. 2008. ISBN 9780143105350

== Awards and honors ==
Villa was granted a Guggenheim Fellowship in Creative Writing by American writer Conrad Aiken, wherein he was also awarded a $1,000 prize for "outstanding work in American literature", as well as a fellowship from Bollingen Foundation. He was also bestowed an Academy Award for Literature from The American Academy of Arts and Letters in 1943. Villa also won first prize in the Poetry Category of UP Golden Jubilee Literary Contests in 1958, as well as the Pro Patria Award for literature in 1961, and the Heritage Award for poetry and short stories a year later. He was conferred with a honoris causa doctorate degree for literature by Far Eastern University in Manila on 1959 (and later by University of the Philippines), and the National Artist Award for Literature in 1973.

He was one of three Filipinos, along with novelist José Rizal and translator Nick Joaquin, included in World Poetry: An Anthology of Verse from Antiquity to Our Time published in 2000, which featured over 1,600 poems written by hundreds of poets in different languages and culture within a span of 40 centuries dating from the development of early writing in ancient Sumer and Egypt.

He was nominated for the 1971 Nobel Prize in Literature by Pacita Habana and other professors from Far Eastern University, and Alejandro Roces, chair of the UNESCO National Commission of the Philippines. In 1973 and 1974, he was nominated by Purita Kalaw Ledesma, founder of the Art Association of the Philippines. Though nominated for the prize, the Nobel Library of the Swedish Academy only owns two of his poetry collections, Selected Poems and New and Poems 55, used for deliberations.

== See also ==
- List of Filipino Nobel laureates and nominees
