= Vivian Talambiras-Cruz =

Filipino anti-nuclear activist

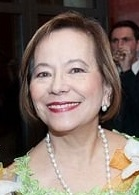
- Born: 2 December 1948 (age 77); Batangas City, Batangas, Philippines
- Known for: Anti-nuclear activism
- Awards: Nobel Peace Prize (2005); The Outstanding Filipinos in America (2018)

Mary Vivian Talambiras-Cruz (born 2 December 1948) was a Filipino anti-nuclear activist who served as assistant to the IAEA Director Mohamed ElBaradei and a member of the International Atomic Energy Agency (IAEA) at the United Nations from 1987 to 2010.

== Biography ==
Talambiras-Cruz graduated at Assumption College with a degree in Banking & Finance. She went to the United States in 1979 as a tourist but decided to stay for good when she found work at the Egyptian Consulate.

During her time in International Atomic Energy Agency, she contributed to the investigations into the United States' claims that Iraq was restarting its nuclear weapons development. The accusations would ultimately turn out to be untrue, but not until after the United States had carried out Operation Enduring Freedom in 2003. She claimed that the conflict might have been avoided if the investigations had been permitted to proceed.

Her husband, Frank Cruz, was a survivor of the September 11 attacks having managed to escape World Trade Center's Tower 1 less than 10 minutes before the entire building collapsed.

When IAEA won the 2005 Nobel Peace Prize, she partook in the Nobel celebrations held at Oslo, Norway and was given a certificate by the Nobel Committee along with other members of the IAEA staff as the agency worked on the verification process and negotiated reason with the world powers.
