= Marcelo Nubla =

Chinese Filipino lawyer

Dr. Marcelo Nubla
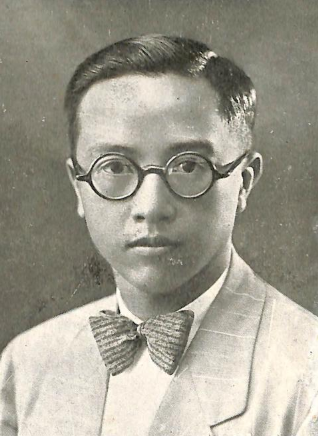

Chairman, China Banking Corporation
- In office 1981–1984
- President: Robert Dee Se Wee
- Preceded by: Dee K. Chiong
- Succeeded by: Edward S. Go

Vice Chairman, China Banking Corporation
- In office 1955–1980
- Preceded by: Dee K. Chiong
- Succeeded by: Gilbert U. Dee

Personal details
- Born: Kao Tsu-chuen (高子泉); 12 September 1898 Manila, Philippines
- Died: November 12, 1985 (aged 87) Philippines
- Parent(s): Manuel Nubla (father); Tang Kin Nubla (mother)

Kao Tsu-chuen (Chinese: 高子泉; 12 September 1898 – 12 November 1985), better known as Marcelo Nubla, was a Chinese–Filipino lawyer and businessman who served as director of China Banking Corporation. In 1973, he was nominated for the Nobel Peace Prize.

== Biography ==
=== Early life ===
Marcelo Nubla was born on 12 September 1898, in Manila to Fukienese parents, Manuel Nubla and Tang Kin. He finished his primary education at the Anglo-Chinese School of Manila and secondary education at St. Joseph's College in Hongkong.

=== Education ===
He started studying law at The University of Hong Kong from 1917 to 1918, but transferred to the University of the Philippines Manila from 1918 to 1920 and finished his degree in 1922 at the Philippine Law School. The following year, he went to the United States and took a post-graduate study at Georgetown University in Washington, D.C., from which he earned his Master of Laws and Doctor of Juridical Science degrees in 1923 and 1924, respectively.

=== Legal career ===
Returning to the Philippines, the Philippine Government offered him a bar examination, which he passed honorably, granting him permission to practice law throughout the country generally. He eventually became the legal practitioner and advisor of the Chinese Consul General and the Chinese Nationalist Party, and handled many significant cases in the Philippine Courts of Justice. He also became the chairman of China Banking Corporation from 1981 to 1984 after serving as its vice-chairman from 1955 to 1980. He was one of its founding board members.

He served as president of the Chinese Community, one of the three largest Chinese organizations in the Philippines and the proprietor of the Chinese Cemetery and the Philippine Chinese General Hospital. The Chinese Consulate-General in the Philippines hired him as a legal advisor, and he also held positions as co-chairman of the Philippine Chinese National Salvation Association, chairman of the Committee of Foreign Affairs and Honorary Secretary of the Philippine Chinese General Chamber of Commerce, chairman of the Committee of the China Aero Institute (Manila Chapter), chairman of the Philippine Chapter of the Chinese Scouts, and member of the Wack Wack Golf and Country Club of Manila.

=== Personal life and family ===
Nubla married Maria Lourdes Dee Limgenco (1904–1961), daughter of Chinese banker Antonio Limgenco. Together, the couple had seven children:

- Maria Gloria (Sis. Helena; 1928–2014), entered the Religious of the Good Shepherd.
- Jesus Venancio "Jesse" (1929–1992), migrated to the United States.
- Grace Maria Pilar (born 1930), wife of Manuel Tan Liao.
- Michael (born 1931)
- William (born 1934)
- Concepcion (Sis. Joseph Lourdes; born 1936), entered the Maryknoll Sisters.
- Charles Vincent (died 1948), infant.

He died on 12 November 1985 at the age of 87 and was buried at the Manila Chinese Cemetery. Actress Coney Reyes is her great-grandniece.

=== Honors ===
In 1973, he was nominated for the Nobel Peace Prize by Filipino politician Jose Roy "for his identification of two evils, namely "selfishness" and "greed", and advocating for peace through elimination of these evils". According to the Nobel archives, he was the second Filipino to be recognized for such an honor after diplomat Carlos P. Romulo in 1952.

In September 2018, he was posthumously awarded the Manila Cathedral Award, presented by Cardinal Luis Antonio Tagle and Chief Justice Artemio Panganiban. On his behalf, it was received by his grandson Johnny Nubla-Liao.
