= Proceso Gabriel =

Filipino physician and bacteriologist

Proceso Gabriel TOSD
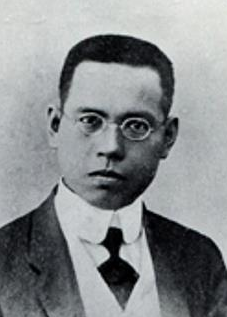
- Gabriel during the 1910s
- Born: Proceso Gabriel y Bautista; July 2, 1887; Santa Ana, Manila, Captaincy General of the Philippines
- Died: November 4, 1935 (aged 48); Manila, Philippine Commonwealth
- Citizenship: Philippines
- Education: University of Santo Tomas
- Known for: establishing first bacteriological laboratory in the Philippines
- Spouse: Carmen Borja
- Parents: Juan Gabriel (father); Juana Bautista (mother)
- Scientific career
- Fields: bacteriology, pharmacology, parasitology
- Workplaces: Philippine Bureau of Health; University of Santo Tomas

Proceso Bautista Gabriel (2 July 1887 – 4 November 1935) was a Filipino physician and bacteriologist known for establishing the first privately owned bacteriological laboratory in the Philippines.

== Biography ==
=== Early life ===
Gabriel was born on July 2, 1887, in Santa Cruz, Manila, the second of five children of Juana Bautista and Juan Gabriel, a leather dealer.

=== Medical career ===
After finishing medical studies at the University of Santo Tomas on January 14, 1903, Gabriel worked as a lecturer at the university while serving as Manila's municipal physician. He was among the first graduates of the first medical school in the Philippines together with José Rizal, Aristón Bautista, Manuel S. Guerrero, Trinidad Pardo de Tavera, Salvador Vivencio del Rosario, Sixto de Los Angeles and others. While practicing his medical profession, he conducted researches on fighting the great epidemics of cholera, smallpox, beriberi, and typhoid fever. He became the head of the Philippine Bureau of Health and assistant Dean at the UST Faculty of Medicine and Surgery. During his 20 years with the Bureau of Health, he published numerous medical researches and textbooks such as Manual de Higiene y Sanitación ("Manual on Hygiene and Sanitation") and Higiene Práctica y Métodos Clínicos de Laboratorio ("Practical Hygiene and Clinical Laboratory Methods").

=== Marriage and family ===
Gabriel married Carmen Borja on November 26, 1905. Together they had five children who became prominent figures in their respective professions:

- Antonio (born ?), head of the Department of Preventive Medicine and Parasitology and chief of the Section of Legal Medicine and History of Medicine, UST Faculty of Medicine Surgery;
- Sis. Maria Carmencita (1910–1998), professed religious of the Maryknoll Sisters;
- Gregorio (born ?), assistant dean and chief of the section of Anatomy of the UST Faculty of Medicine and Surgery;
- Pedro (born ?), chief chemist of YCO Paints, Elizalde & Company, Inc, and professor of philosophy, University of Santo Tomas; and
- Angel (born ?), assistant vice-president of F.G.U. Insurance group.

A devout Roman Catholic, he and his wife were members of the Third Order of Saint Dominic.

=== Death ===
He died on November 4, 1935, due to heart failure in Manila.

== Honors and recognitions ==
In 1929, he was nominated for the Nobel Prize in Physiology or Medicine by Dario del Val of the University of Santo Tomas "for his contributions to the public health and the sanitary progress of the Philippines." He was the first Filipino to be nominated for the Nobel Prize.
