= Antonio Fortich =

Filipino Catholic bishop (1913–2003)

The Most Reverend Antonio Y. Fortich
- Bishop of Bacolod
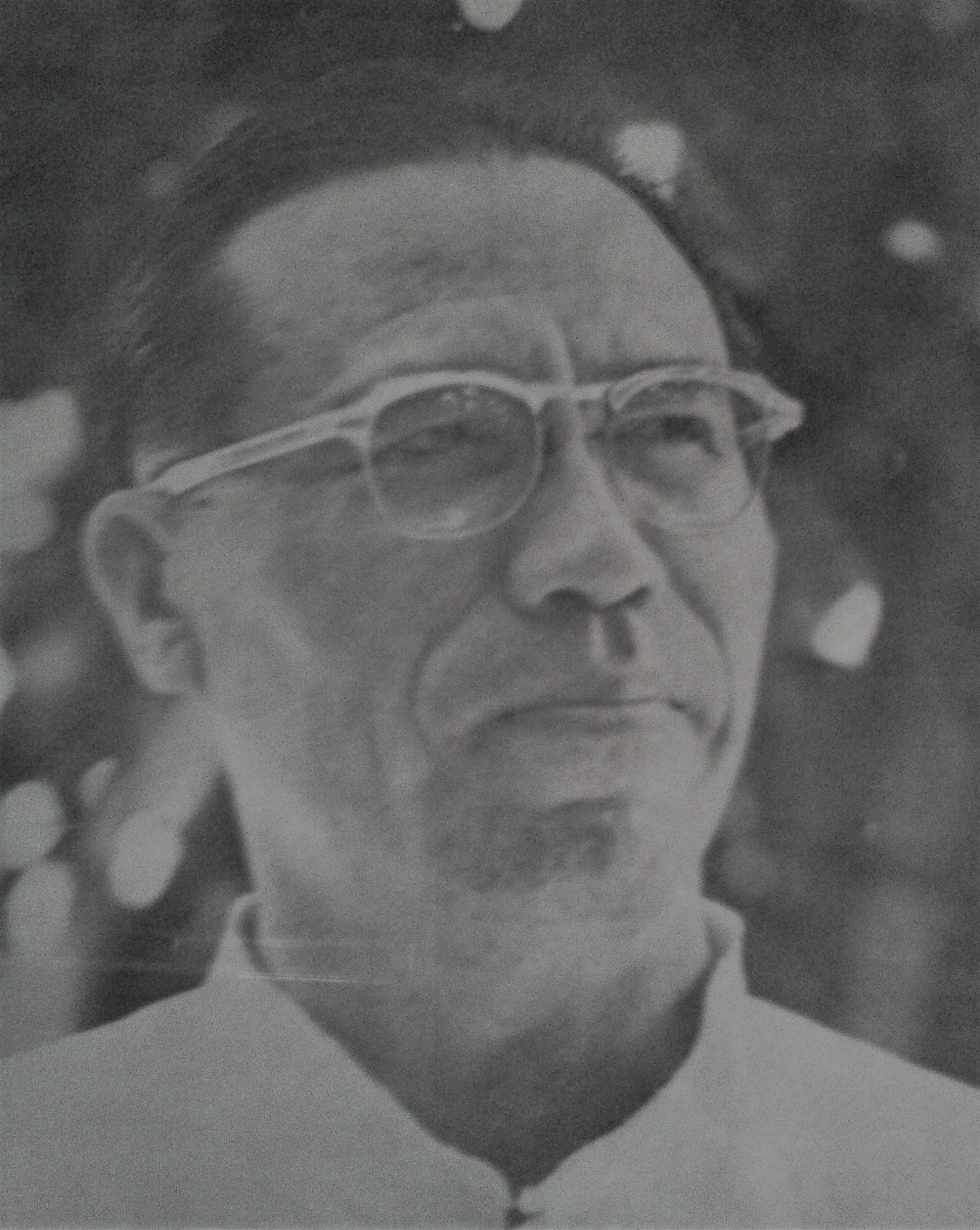
- Province: Jaro
- Diocese: Bacolod
- See: Bacolod
- Installed: 13 January 1967
- Term ended: 31 January 1989
- Predecessor: Manuel Yap
- Successor: Camilo Gregorio

Orders
- Ordination: 4 March 1944 (priest), 24 February 1967 (bishop)

Personal details
- Born: Antonio Yapsutco Fortich; 11 August 1913 Sibulan, Negros Oriental, Philippine Islands
- Died: 2 July 2003 (aged 89) Bacolod, Negros Occidental, Philippines
- Denomination: Roman Catholic
- Residence: Bacolod
- Parents: Ignacio Fortich (father), Rosalia Yapsutco (mother)
- Education: Ateneo de Manila
- Coat of arms

Antonio Yapsutco Fortich (11 August 1913 – 2 July 2003) was the third Bishop of Bacolod. He is noted for being a social activist who fought for social justice in Negros. In 2018, Fortich was recognized by the Human Rights Victims' Claims Board as a Motu Proprio victim of the Martial Law Era.

== Early years ==
Fortich was born on 11 August 1913, in Sibulan, Negros Oriental. He attended elementary and high school in Dumaguete, and pursued his college and theological studies at Ateneo de Manila (San Jose Minor and San Jose Major seminaries). His parents, Ignacio and Rosalia Yapsutco Fortich, were well-to-do farmers and he was the eldest and only son in their family of two.

== Priestly Ministry ==
On 4 March 1944, at the height of World War II, Fortich was ordained by Michael J. O'Doherty, Archbishop of Manila. He served the Diocese of Bacolod under Bishop Casimiro Lladoc, assigning him as assistant parish priest of the San Sebastian Cathedral. In 1949, he was made parish priest of the San Isidro Labrador Parish in Binalbagan (which was then under the Diocese of Bacolod) until after a year and eight months when he was assigned back to Bacolod as parish priest of the diocesan cathedral. He was then appointed as Vicar General of the diocese under Bishop Manuel Yap on 31 December 1952.

Styles of Antonio Fortich
- Reference style: The Most Reverend
- Spoken style: Your Excellency
- Religious style: Bishop
- Posthumous style: not applicable

== Bishop of Bacolod ==
When Bishop Yap died on 16 October 1966, Fortich was assigned diocesan administrator while waiting the appointment of a new bishop. On 13 January 1967, Pope Paul VI appointed him as bishop of the diocese. His episcopate was marked with great concern and action towards the poor and oppressed of his diocese, which is in line with the church teaching of "preferential option for the poor".

He was one of the first people to alert the government to the illegal activities of timber poachers, who had stripped hundreds of acres of forest in Negros. He set up co-operatives composed of small landowners and sugar workers, to break the debt cycle suffered by Filipino sugar workers. In doing so, the bishop antagonized large landowners, including congressman Armando Gustilo, who at one stage tried to intimidate him by lobbing a hand grenade into his house.'

His efforts was encouraged by Pope John Paul II, who personally came to Bacolod and gave a speech to sugarcane workers, landowners, and the faithful of the diocese on 20 February 1981.

In 1983, he led the diocese in celebration of its Golden Jubilee, with Cardinal Jaime Sin giving a speech for the occasion.

== Retirement and death ==
Bishop Fortich resigned on 31 January 1989 after reaching the mandatory age of 75. He was succeeded by Bishop Camilo Gregorio, then Auxiliary Bishop of Cebu.

He supported the election of Joseph Estrada as president of the Philippines, and when it became clear that Estrada was using his position to accumulate personal wealth, the bishop withdrew his support.

He died on 2 July 2003, aged 89. His requiem mass was attended by thousands of people, including former president Gloria Macapagal Arroyo. He is buried in a tomb at the right side of the San Sebastian Cathedral in Bacolod. In 2013, his remains were transferred to a side chapel of the same cathedral.

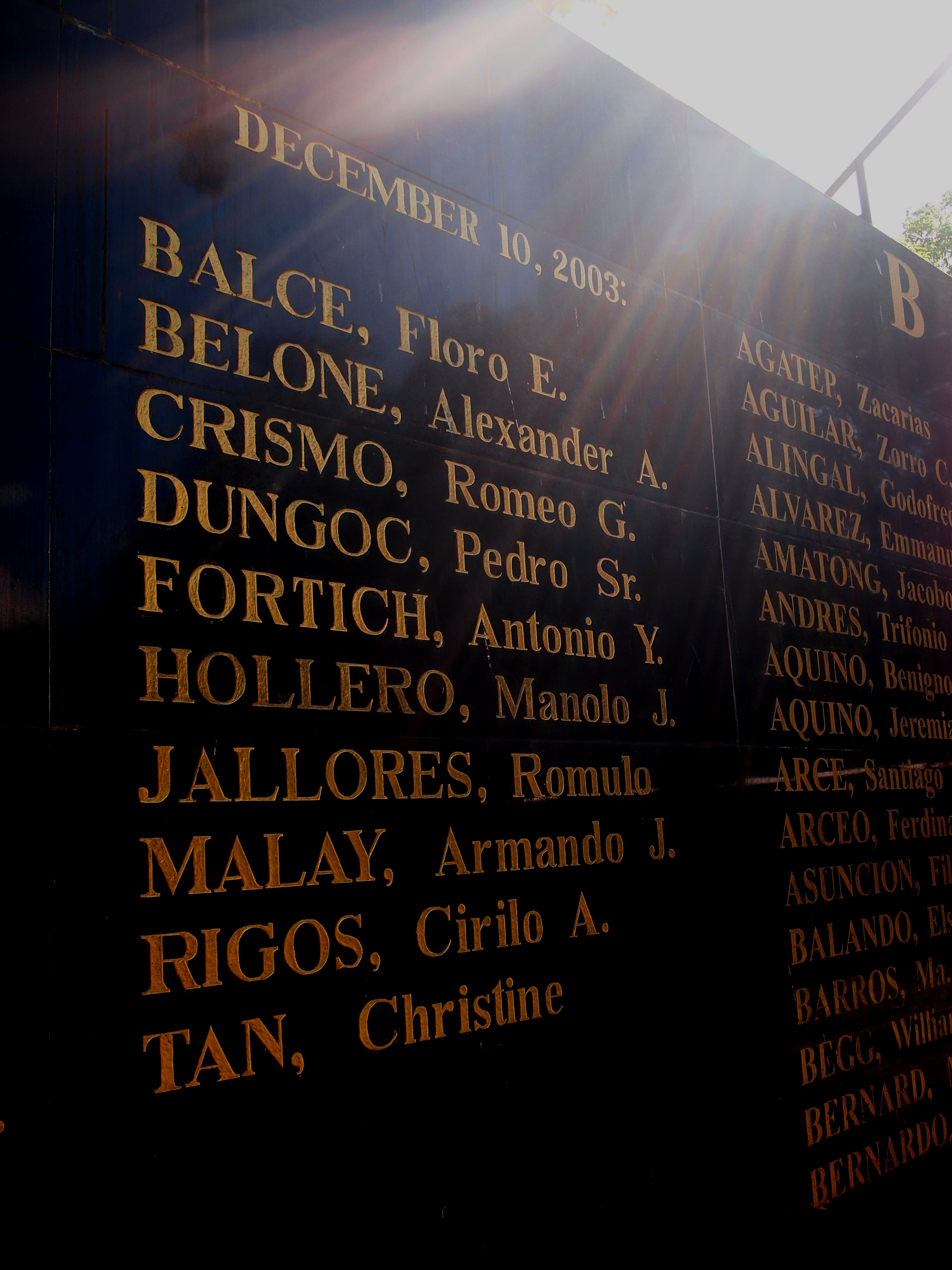
Detail of the Wall of Remembrance at the Bantayog ng mga Bayani, showing names from the 2003 batch of Bantayog Honorees, including that of Antonio Fortich.

== Legacy ==
He was honoured as Domestic Prelate in 1958.

Awarded by the University of Negros Occidental – Recoletos the Honoris Causa: doctor of Philosophy for Humanitarian service in 1969.

His name is inscribed on the Wall of Remembrance at the Philippines' Bantayog ng mga Bayani (Monument of Heroes), in recognition of his opposition to the excesses of the 21-year dictatorship of Ferdinand Marcos.

== See also ==
- List of Filipino Nobel laureates and nominees
