= Jawad Boulos =

Lebanese historian

- جواد بولس (Arabic)
- Born: 1 January 1900; Zgharta, Ottoman Empire
- Died: 16 September 1982 (aged 82); Beirut, Lebanon
- Citizenship: Lebanese
- Occupations: Historian, politician, lawyer

Jawad Semaan Boulous (Arabic: جواد بولس, romanized: Jawād Būlus) (1 January 1900 – 16 September 1982) was a Lebanese Maronite lawyer, politician and historian. His work included Les peuples et les civilisations du Proche-Orient (five volumes) and L'histoire du Liban et des pays environnants.

== Biography ==
Boulous was born on 1 January 1900 in Zgharta, Ottoman Empire (modern-day Lebanon) to Semaan Boulos and Kattour Bacha. His paternal grandfather, Assad Boulos, was the leader of Youssef Bey Karam's army and led a rebellion against the Ottomans. His family, inclined towards politics and jurisprudence, were very devoted to their native land and owned vast properties in North Lebanon.

Boulos, at a young age, possessed exceptional gifts and the precocity of his mind led his parents to send him to the Collège Saint Joseph – Antoura, run by the Lazarist Fathers, to complete his secondary studies. Afterwards, Boulos enrolled in 1919 at the Faculty of Law in Beirut where he obtained his law degree in 1922.

=== In Tripoli ===
After the proclamation of the State of Greater Lebanon in 1920, Boulos returned to his hometown and settled in Tripoli. His legal studies led him to the bar. However, his taste for literature and politics also manifested itself very early in him with a vigor that never waned thereafter.

In 1933 and 1938, Boulos was elected president of the Bar Association of North Lebanon.

In 1938, he was elected deputy of North Lebanon and he demonstrated eloquence and a rare patriotism. In 1943, he was appointed Minister of State in a triumvirate where he represented the Maronite community and held several portfolios, including foreign affairs. Also participating in the triumvirate were Dr. Ayoub Tabet and Emir Khaled Chehab.

=== Literary career ===
As historian, his major works included the five-volume Les peuples et les civilisations du Proche-Orient and L'histoire du Liban et des pays environnants.

In 1971, Boulos was nominated jointly with Georges Schéhadé for the Nobel Prize in Literature by academic Camille Aboussouan.

=== Death ===
Boulos died on 16 September 1982 in Beirut, Lebanon.

== Recognition ==
On August 2015, a website bringing together Boulos' books, conferences, interviews, articles and various works to perpetuate his memory was created at the initiative of the Jouzour Simon Boulos Foundation and the former MP Jawad Boulos. Former Minister Charles Rizk paid tribute to Boulous as "one of the beacons not only of the history of Lebanon, but of the entire Middle East and the Arab world", and described his works as "precious references for many great Arab and international researchers."

== Publications ==
- De 1600 à 64 avant J.-C. (1962)
- De la conquête romaine à l'expansion Arabo-Islamique (64 av. J.-C. – 640 ap. J.-C.) (1964)
- De l'expansion Arabo-Islamique à la conquête turco-ottomane (640–1517) (1964)
- Le proche Orient ottoman (1517–1918) et postottoman (1918–1930) (1968)
- Les peuples et les civilisations du Proche Orient (1968)
- L'histoire du Liban et des pays environnants (1970)
