= Bruce Tolentino =

Filipino economist, author, professor, and economic policymaker

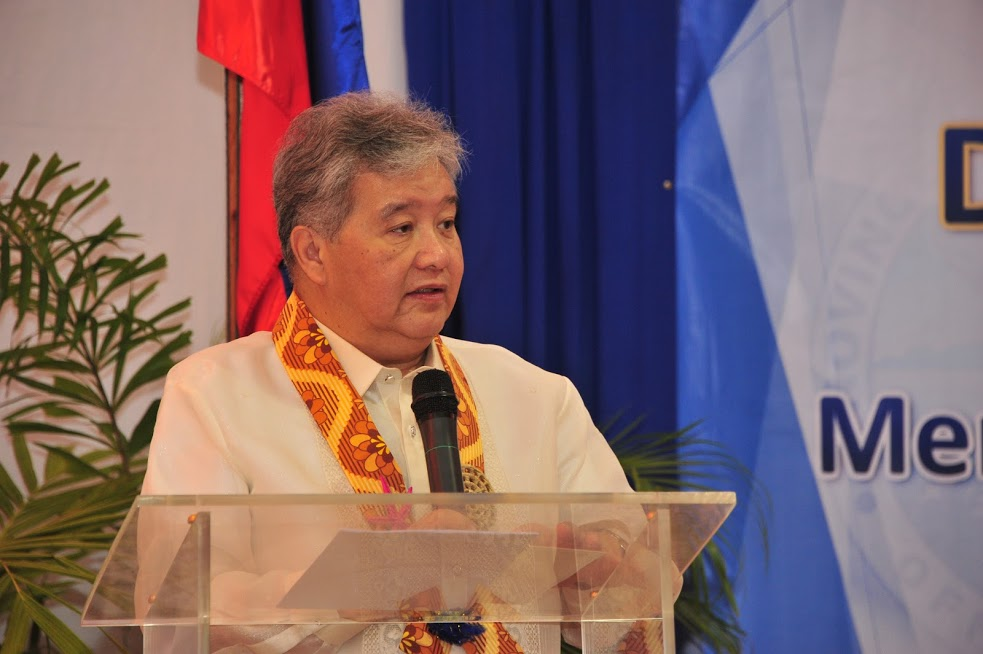
- Bruce Tolentino in Dinagat Islands, 2018
- Born: Victor Bruce Jularbal Tolentino; June 2, 1953 (age 73); Baguio, Philippines
- Occupations: Economist, Author, Economic Policymaker
- Spouse: Rory Francisco
- Children: 2

Academic background
- Education: Xavier University – Ateneo de Cagayan (BS, MA); University of Hawaiʻi at Mānoa (PhD)
- Thesis: Economies of Scale, Relative Efficiency and Banking Policy (1986)

Academic work
- Main interests: Financial Economics; Economic Development; Human Resource Economics

Victor Bruce Jularbal Tolentino, is a Filipino economist, author, professor, and economic policymaker.

== Early childhood and education ==
Bruce Tolentino was born on June 2, 1953, in Baguio, to Toots, a salesman, and Florence, who managed the family's photo studio. He graduated from Saint Louis High School and continued his studies at Saint Louis University, where he served as the editor-in-chief of the *White and Blue* campus publication.

Tolentino pursued a diverse academic path, earning a Bachelor of Arts in Economics from Xavier University – Ateneo de Cagayan in 1978. Prior to that, he studied in the A.B. English Program at Mindanao State University (1975-1977) and the A.B. Mass Communications Program at Saint Louis University (1969-1972). He later obtained an M.S. in Economics from Xavier University in 1979, followed by studies in the Ph.D. Economics Program at the University of the Philippines (1981-1982), before completing his Ph.D. in Economics at the University of Hawaiʻi in 1986. Tolentino left his boyhood home after the declaration of Martial Law in 1972, escaping to Marawi in Mindanao, where his interests shifted from communications to economics as he became involved in rural development.

After completing his graduate studies, Tolentino returned to the Philippines and began working in government, focusing on policy-reform processes. He played a key role in the Philippines' membership in the World Trade Organization and was part of the team that developed the initial drafts of both the Agri-Agra Reform Law and the Local Government Code of 1992.

== Career ==
After graduate school at Xavier University in Cagayan de Oro, Mindanao, and University of Hawaii in Honolulu, Bruce returned to the Philippines and began work in the government with a focus on policy-reform processes. He was part of the group that put together the Philippines' membership in the World Trade Organization. He was also on the team that developed the initial draft of the Agri-Agra Reform Law as well as that of the Local Government Code of 1992.

In the 1980s, Bruce was appointed first executive director of the Agricultural Credit Policy Council (ACPC) jointly appointed by former Central Bank Governor Jobo Fernandez and former Agriculture Secretary Ramon Mitra Jr. His function was as lead technical adviser for a rehabilitation program for all of the rural banks that had been organized, and subsequently failed, during the Masagana 99 era of subsidized loans for rice and corn production.

He served as Assistant Secretary, then Undersecretary of Agriculture (for Policy, Planning, and International Trade) of the Department of Agriculture of the Philippines from 1986 to 1993.

From 2007 to 2012, he served in various positions within The Asia Foundation, including Chief Economist and Country Representative for Sri Lanka, Pakistan, and Afghanistan.

From 2012 to 2018 he served as Deputy Director-General of the International Rice Research Institute (IRRI), based in Los Baños, Laguna, and was also elected Secretary of its Board of Trustees.

In 2018, Tolentino was appointed by President Rodrigo Duterte to the Monetary Board of the Bangko Sentral ng Pilipinas (BSP) , the central bank's highest policy-making body to serve the remaining term of the recently departed Valentin Araneta. He was reappointed on July 2020.

In 2021, the Agricultural Credit Policy Council launched Enabling Rural and Agricultural Finance for Inclusive Development in the Philippines. Split into three volumes, the book is a collection of Bruce Tolentino's papers, memos, and reports that span four decades of work. It contains "... a record of the challenges, responses, successes as well as failures in rural finance and intermediation" over the course of his career.

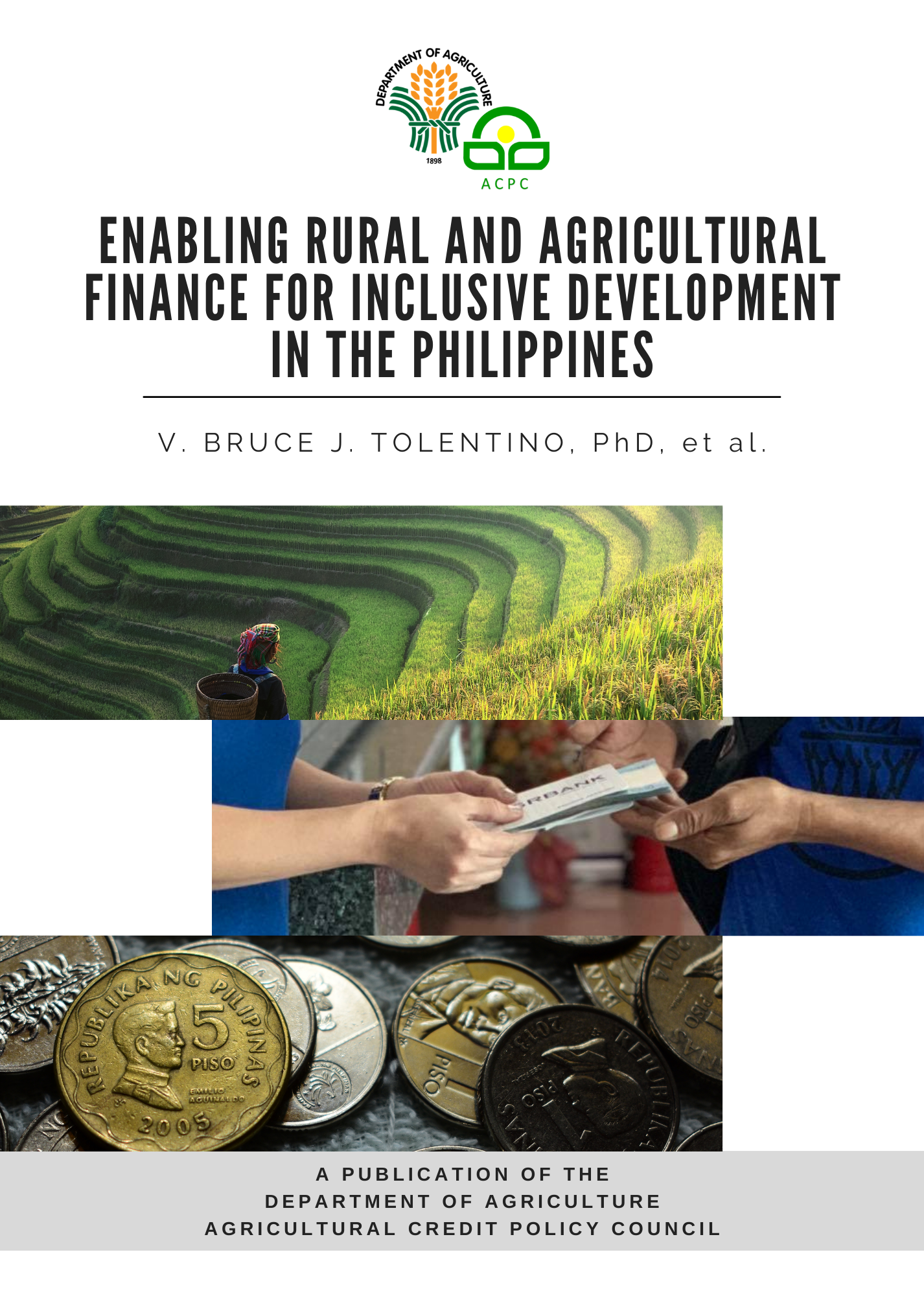
The cover of Bruce Tolentino's 2021 release, Enabling Rural and Agricultural Finance for Inclusive Development in the Philippines

In 2024, Tolentino (along with fellow Monetary Board Member Anita Linda Aquino) was involved in a "ghost employees" scandal at the BSP which ultimately led him (and Aquino) to resign from the position. Several months later, he started teaching at the Department of Economics, College of Economics and Management (CEM), at the University of the Philippines Los Baños (UPLB). His term at the BSP was supposed to be until July 2026. Veteran banker Walter Wassmer was appointed in his stead to serve the remaining term.

== Food security ==
With more than 35 years of experience in governance, management, analysis, and planning socio-economic development reforms and initiatives, Bruce has worked on many agri and food security related projects.

According to Bruce, food security is a regional, even international effort. "Agriculture—which produces food—cannot be confined to the artificial borders of countries. Food is a product of human ingenuity applied to natural resources—land, water, sunlight, rainfall—that also spill across borders. Some countries, especially the large countries like the US, China, India, have more than enough food. Many other, smaller countries—such as Singapore, Malaysia, Korea—are largely dependent on food produced by others. With worsening climate change and resource degradation, as populations continue to grow, open international trade and global cooperation is becoming even more imperative to ensure that all populations of all nations share in the bounty of the earth as a whole."

== Personal life ==
Bruce is married to Rory Francisco-Tolentino, former director of Philippine Business for Social Progress and Ayala Foundation and current consultant for various nonprofit management projects. He has two children.
