= Don Alejandro Roces Sr. Science-Technology High School =

Public high school in Quezon City, Philippines

- Mataas na Paaralang pang-Agham at Teknolohiya ng Don Alejandro Roces, Ama (Filipino)

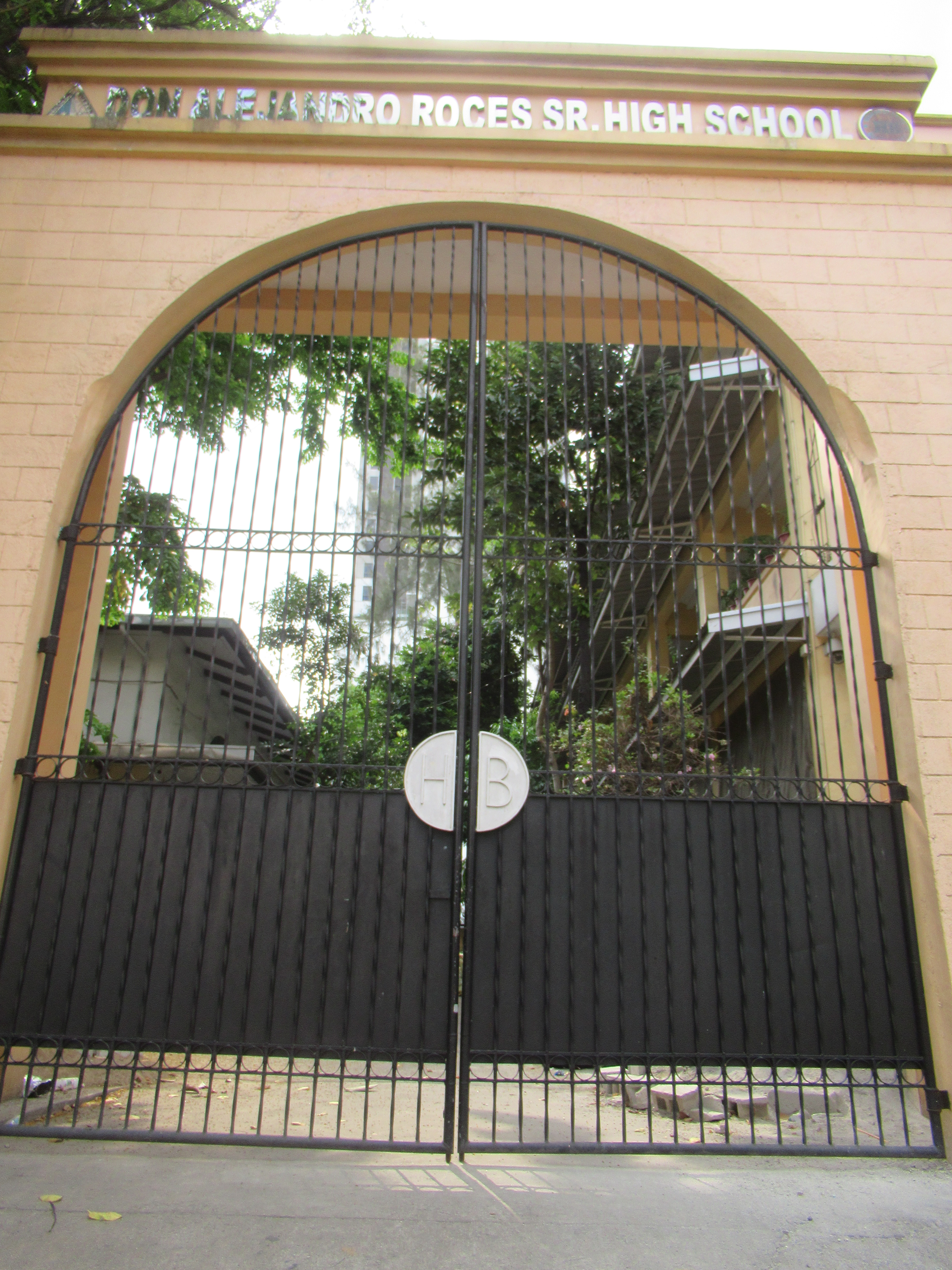
- Gate

Location
- Don A. Roces Avenue, Brgy. Obrero; Quezon City; Philippines; 14°37′43″N 121°01′52″E

Information
- Type: Government High School
- Founder: Don Alejandro Roces
- School district: District IV
- Category: Secondary School (High School)
- School number: 305360
- Principal: Mrs. Adora B. Teaño
- Grades: 7–12
- Colors: Blue and White
- Nickname: "Rocesians", "Mad Ants" (sports nickname)
- Newspaper: The Flint (English); Ang Krisalis (Filipino)
- Affiliation: Department of Education (Philippines) Science high schools in Metro Manila
- Website: sites.google.com/depedqc.ph/darssths/home

Don Alejandro Roces Sr. Science - Technology High School (DARSSTHS), formerly known as Don Alejandro Roces Sr. Vocational High School or more colloquially known as "Roces", is a Public Science-Technology High School located along Don A. Roces Avenue, Quezon City, Philippines. DARSSTHS was founded by Don Alejandro Roces on September 29, 1954.

== Admissions ==
DARSSTHS only admits 300–450 students out of a range of 4,000 applicants through an entrance exam. Though, it is possible to enter without taking an exam by applying as an incoming Senior High School student.

== Student Life ==
It is home to Rocesians who continuously change the game by showcasing their abilities through interschool competitions, and coming home with titles for the school. DARSSTHS is known for their podium titles in District and Division competitions.

== TVL Strands Offered ==
=== Junior High School ===
DARSSTHS offers various technical-vocational training programs. Its students are given an aptitude exam during their 7th grade and the top scored vocation, or either from the student's top 3 scored, is assigned to the student at the start of their 8th grade. Students may switch their assigned vocation with other students of different vocation class during the first week. During their 7th grade, students are introduced with the various training programs through the subject Technical Vocational Education (TVE) -- which is a mixture of theoretical and practical class.

==== Grade 8 ====
- Automotive Servicing
- Computer System Servicing (CSS)
- Electronics
- Drafting
- Electrician
- Culinary Arts
- Tailoring and Dressmaking
- Cosmetology
- Computer Hardware
- Furniture and Cabinet Making (FCM)
- Shielded Metal Arc Wielding (SMAW)
- Machining

==== Grade 9 ====
- Automotive Servicing
- Computer System Servicing (CSS)
- Electronics
- Drafting
- Electrician
- Culinary Arts
- Tailoring and Dressmaking
- Cosmetology
- Computer Hardware
- Furniture and Cabinet Making (FCM)
- Shielded Metal Arc Wielding (SMAW)
- Machining

==== Grade 10 ====
- Automotive Servicing
- Computer System Servicing (CSS)
- Electronics
- Drafting
- Electrician
- Culinary Arts
- Tailoring and Dressmaking
- Cosmetology
- Computer Hardware
- Furniture and Cabinet Making (FCM)
- Shielded Metal Arc Wielding (SMAW)
- Machining

=== Senior High School ===
==== Grade 11 ====
- Automotive Servicing
- Computer System Servicing (CSS)
- Electrical Installation and Maintenance (EIM)
- Foods and Beverages Servicing (FBS)
- Technical Drafting

==== Grade 12 ====
- Animation
- Automotive Servicing
- Bread and Pastry Production (BPP)
- Computer System Servicing (CSS)
- Cookery
- Dressmaking
- Electrical Installation and Maintenance (EIM)
