= Franz Ontal =

Filipino anti-nuclear activist

Franz G. Ontal
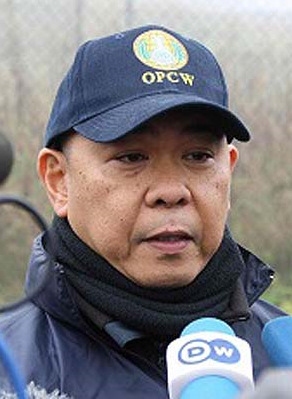
- Born: Franz Gamboa Ontal; 27 April 1964 (age 62); Victorias, Negros Occidental, Philippines
- Known for: Anti-nuclear activism
- Awards: Nobel Peace Prize (2013)

Franz Gamboa Ontal (born 27 April 1964) is a Filipino anti-nuclear activist known for his role as head of inspector training at the Organisation for the Prohibition of Chemical Weapons (OPCW).

== Biography ==
Ontal studied at La Salle High School in Bacolod, Negros Occidental and completed undergraduate degree in biology premed studies at the University of St. La Salle. He immigrated with to the United States, becoming a paramedic and emergency medical technician instructor with the New York City Health and Hospital Corporation.

In 2008, Ontal left for The Hague, Netherlands to start his work in the Organisation for the Prohibition of Chemical Weapons (OPCW) as a medic for the chemical weapons inspector and disposal teams. He would later become head of inspector training, a position he held when the organization won the 2013 Nobel Peace Prize.
