= Richard E. Kim =

Korean American novelist (1932–2009)

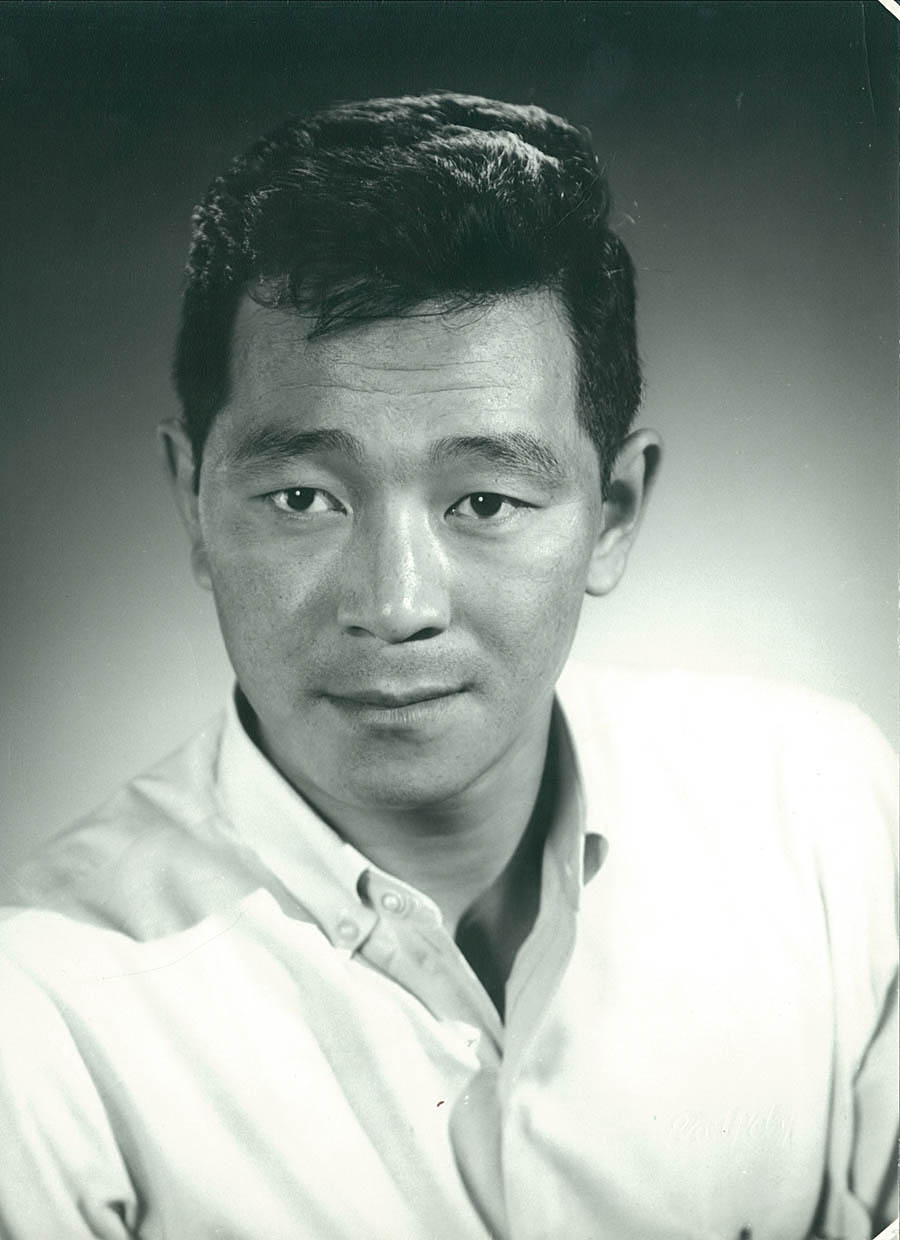
- Born: Richard Eun Kook Kim; 1932; Kankō, Kankyōnan-dō, Korea, Empire of Japan
- Died: 2009 (aged 76–77); Massachusetts, USA
- Citizenship: United States
- Education: Middlebury College; Johns Hopkins University; Iowa Writers' Workshop; Harvard University
- Occupations: Author; teacher; documentarian
- Writing career
- Notable works: The Martyred; The Innocent; Lost Names
- Notable awards: Guggenheim Fellowship; NEA Fellowship; Ford Foundation Fellowship

Korean name
- Hangul: 김은국
- Hanja: 金恩國
- RR: Gim Eunguk
- MR: Kim Ŭn'guk

Richard Eun Kook Kim (1932–2009) was a Korean–American writer and professor of literature. He was the author of The Martyred (1964), The Innocent (1968), and Lost Names (1970), and many other works. He was a Guggenheim Fellow (1966) and was a recipient of a Fulbright grant. His most popular work is Lost Names, a fictional work based on his experience during the Japanese colonization of Korea.

== Biography ==
Kim Eun Kook, a naturalized U.S. citizen, was born in 1932 in Hamhung, South Hamgyong, a city in what is now North Korea. He was raised first in Korea, then Manchukuo, and then Korea again. His childhood consisted of living during the tail end of the Japanese occupation. After serving in the Republic of Korea Marine Corps and Army, 1950–54, he was honorably discharged as first lieutenant of the Infantry in 1954 and came to the United States in 1955.

He was educated at Middlebury College in Vermont, where he studied political science and history, 1955–59; at Johns Hopkins University (M.A. in writing, 1960); at the University of Iowa's Writers Workshop (M.F.A. 1962); and at Harvard University (M.A. in Far Eastern languages and literature, 1963).

== Career ==
The Martyred, Kim's first novel, is about the Korean War, which would be made into a play, an opera, and a film. It was also nominated for a National Book Award. It was followed by The Innocent (1968), about politics in postwar South Korea, and Lost Names: Scenes from a Korean Boyhood (1970), a collection of stories.

His academic experience included various professorships in English at the University of Massachusetts Amherst, Syracuse University, San Diego State University, and at Seoul National University, where he was a Fulbright professor, 1981–83.

He received a Ford Foundation Foreign Area Fellowship (1962–63), a Guggenheim Fellowship (1966), the First Award, Modern Korean Literature Translation Awards (1974), a National Endowment for the Arts Literary Fellowship (1978–79), and other awards and honors.

His published original works include the novels The Martyred (1964), The Innocent (1968) and Lost Names (1970); a children's story, "A Blue Bird" (in Korean, 1983); "In Search of Lost Years" (in Korean, 1985), and "Lost Koreans in China and the Soviet Union: Photo-Essays" (1989). His television work, for KBS-TV of Seoul, includes "200 Years of Christianity in Korea" (1981), "The Korean War" (1983), "On Japan" (1984), "Reflections on the Wartime Massacres" (1985), "A Passage to Manchuria" (1987), "In Search of Lost Koreans in the Soviet Union" (1988), and "The Great Trans-Siberian Railway" (1989). He was a columnist for The Korea Herald and The Chosun Ilbo (Korea Daily) in Seoul, 1981–84.

Family and life experiences have played a huge role as inspiration for his writing. His father is the more influential of these, and Kim has described his father as a saint. His father is also a major character in his book Lost Names (1970).

== Books ==
- The Martyred. Originally published in 1964; reissued by Penguin Classics, 2011.
- The Innocent. 1968.
- Lost Names: Scenes from a Korean Boyhood. Originally published in 1970; reissued by University of California Press in 1998; special 40th anniversary edition issued in 2011 with new preface.

== The Martyred ==
After twelve Christian ministers are found dead, allegedly at the hand of the Communists, Captain Lee, the narrator, is sent to interview the two survivors. Lee hopes one of them, Reverend Shin, will confess to betraying his colleagues, which Lee could use to discredit the Communists and arouse the support of the Korean Christians for the war. Although Shin is innocent—in fact, he was spared because unlike the others, he refused to denounce his faith—he falsely confesses to the betrayal and, after being "forgiven", becomes a popular preacher who deliberately preserves the people's false image of the fallen ministers as "martyrs", recognizing that his parishioners are already burdened beyond their abilities by the war and that he loves them too much to destroy their faith.

The novel also addresses larger questions about the war and about Korean Christianity, about the juxtaposition between the large-scale suffering of the public during wartime and the individual aspects of faith, hope, confession, etc. Although the story is built around the twelve murdered ministers, Kim returns to the suffering of the innocent Koreans as a whole, thus implicitly posing the question of whether the people of Korea are just as much "martyrs" as the twelve murdered men.

The novel was immensely popular, staying on the New York Times Bestseller List for twenty weeks and being translated into ten languages. It was a nominee for the National Book Award and for the Nobel Prize in Literature.

== The Innocent ==
Kim brings back characters from The Martyred in this novel set around a fictional coup d'état in South Korea (such as the one that occurred in 1961) and about the ethical dilemma encountered by a group of army officers as they realize that morality may require them to do horrific deeds. Major Lee (the captain of the previous novel) wants to use peaceful means to change the corrupt civilian government, believing that violence cannot be used to end violence. But after removing General Ham, the other conspirators want to punish him with execution. Lee is contrasted by his friend Colonel Min, the group leader who prefers more forceful methods, and as the events spiral beyond the control of the conspirators, Min separates himself from Lee's calls for non-violence; still, after the coup's success, Min acknowledges to Lee that Lee's focus on remaining innocent, even if it is unrealistic, prevents Min from being seen as anything other than a murderer.

In this novel Kim reflects on the difficulty not only of rebuilding the nation after a horrific war, but also of maintaining one's innocence amidst so much corruption and in the face of the continued momentum of wartime violence. This novel was not as successful as The Martyred, perhaps because it was published during protests against the Vietnam War, and enthusiasm for Kim decreased as a result.

== Lost Names ==
A fictional book about Kim's experiences during the Japanese occupation of Korea. However, when discussing the fictional and nonfictional aspects of his book, Kim stated "All the characters and events described in this book are real, but everything else is fiction..." Kim's experiences are not always the most uplifting, but Kim does not intend the book to be interpreted as anti-Japanese. The title Lost Names was translated very differently into the Korean language. The "Lost" on the title to the Koreans meant "forcibly taken away", but Kim does not desire for that to be the depiction of the title, he simply meant lost.

His favorite scene in Lost Names is the chapter "Once Upon a Time, on a Sunday." The scene is when the boy is looking up at the night sky realizing everything going on is insignificant compared to the vastness and possibilities the night sky represents.
