= Alejandro Roces =

Filipino author and politician

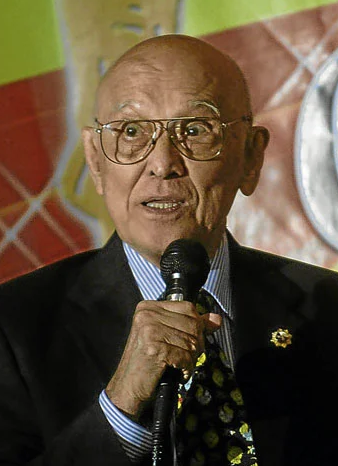

Chairman of the Movie and Television Review and Classification Board
- In office March 23, 2001 – 2002
- Preceded by: Nicanor Tiongson
- Succeeded by: Marilen Ysmael-Dinglasan

35th Secretary of Education
- In office December 30, 1962 – September 7, 1965
- President: Diosdado Macapagal
- Preceded by: Jose Tuason
- Succeeded by: Carlos P. Romulo

Personal details
- Born: Alejandro Reyes Roces; July 13, 1924 Manila, Philippine Islands
- Died: May 23, 2011 (aged 86) Manila, Philippines
- Spouse: Irene Yorston Viola
- Parent(s): Rafael Roces and Inocencia Baptista-Reyes
- Occupation: Journalist; author; essayist; dramatist; educator
- Known for: Changing the date of Philippine Independence Day from July 4 to June 12; Recovering the stolen original manuscripts of Noli Me Tangere, El Filibusterismo and Mi último Adiós; Changed the language used in Philippine passports, coins, bills and diplomas to Wikang Pambansa
- Awards: Order of National Artists of the Philippines

Alejandro Reyes Roces, Sr. (13 July 1924 – 23 May 2011) was a Filipino author, essayist, dramatist and a National Artist of the Philippines for literature. He served as Secretary of Education from 1962 to 1965, during the term of Philippine President Diosdado Macapagal.

Noted for his short stories, the Manila-born Roces was married to Irene Yorston Viola (granddaughter of Maximo Viola), with whom he had a daughter, Elizabeth Roces-Pedrosa.

He attended elementary and high school at the Ateneo de Manila University, before moving to the University of Arizona and then Arizona State University for his tertiary education. He graduated with a Bachelor in Fine Arts (B.F.A.), and attained his M.A. from the Far Eastern University back in the Philippines. He has since received honorary doctorates from Toyo University, Baguio's St. Louis University, Polytechnic University of the Philippines, and the Ateneo de Manila University. Roces was a captain in the Marking's Guerilla during World War II and a columnist in Philippine dailies such as the Manila Chronicle and the Manila Times. He was previously President of the Manila Bulletin and of the CAP College Foundation.

In 2001, Roces was appointed as Chairman of the Movie and Television Review and Classification Board (MTRCB). Roces also became a member of the Board of Trustees of GSIS (Government Service Insurance System) and maintained a column in the Philippine Star called Roses and Thorns.

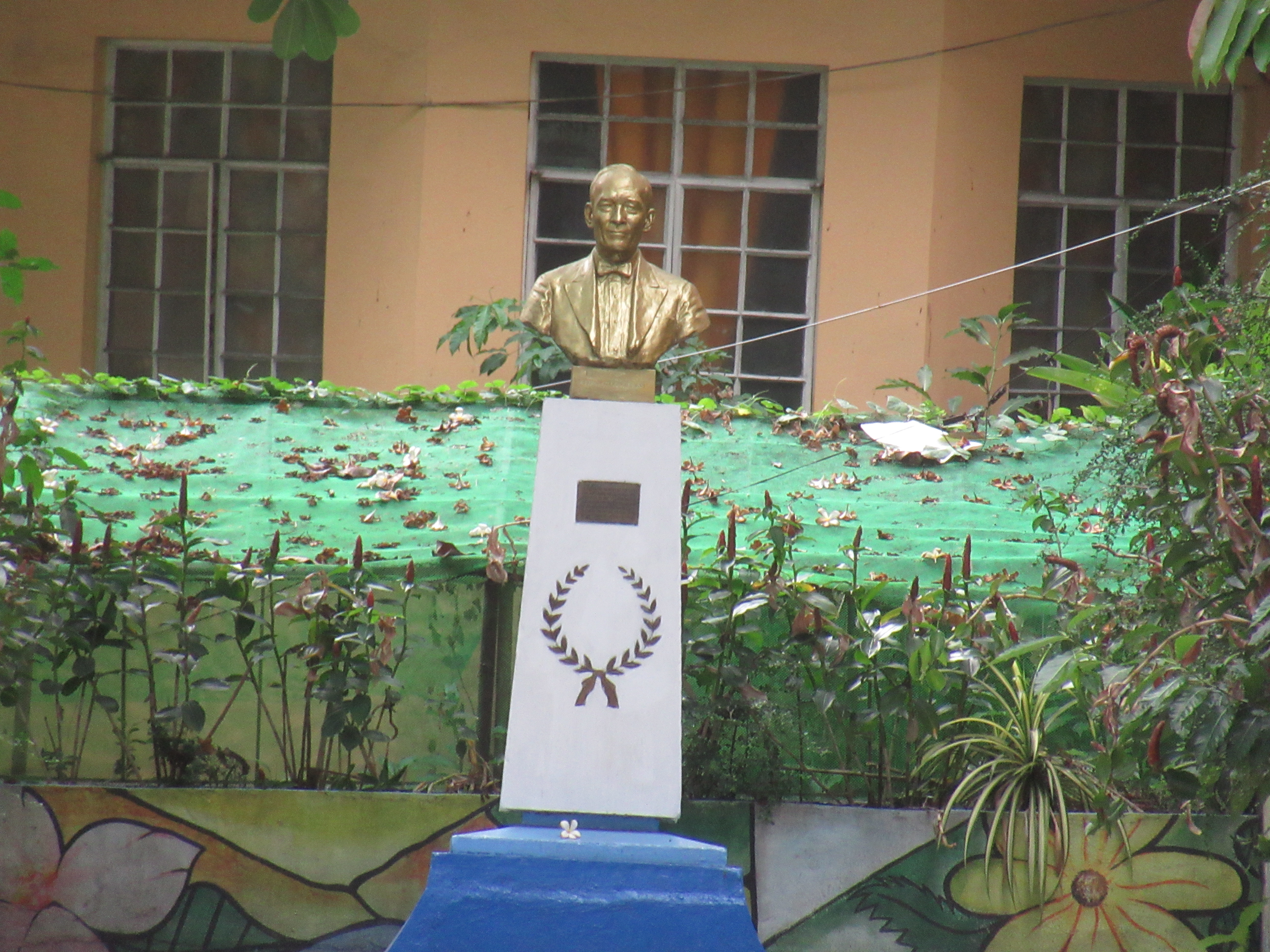
Don Alejandro Roces Sr. Science-Technology High School

== Career ==
During his freshman year in the University of Arizona, Roces won Best Short Story for "We Filipinos are Mild Drinkers". Another of his stories, "My Brother's Peculiar Chicken", was listed as Martha Foley's Best American Stories among the most distinctive for years 1958 and 1951. Roces also published books such as Of Cocks and Kites and (1959) Fiesta (1980). He collected his short stories in the book Something to Crow About (2005). Of Cocks and Kites earned him the reputation as the country's best writer of humorous stories. It also contained the widely anthologized piece "My Brother's Peculiar Chicken". Fiesta, is a book of essays, featuring folk festivals such as Ermita's Bota Flores, Aklan's Ati-atihan, and Naga's Peñafrancia.

The book Something to Crow About was adapted into a stage musical, which is considered the first Filipino zarzuela in English. The modern zarzuela tells the story of a poor cockfighter named Kiko who, to his wife's chagrin, pays more attention to the roosters than to her. Kiko's brother Leandro competes with Golem, the son of a wealthy and powerful man, over the affections of a beautiful woman named Luningning. They try to resolve this conflict through a cockfight. Something to Crow About won the Aliw Award for Best Musical and Best Director for a Musical Production. It also had a run off-Broadway at the La Mama Theatre in New York.

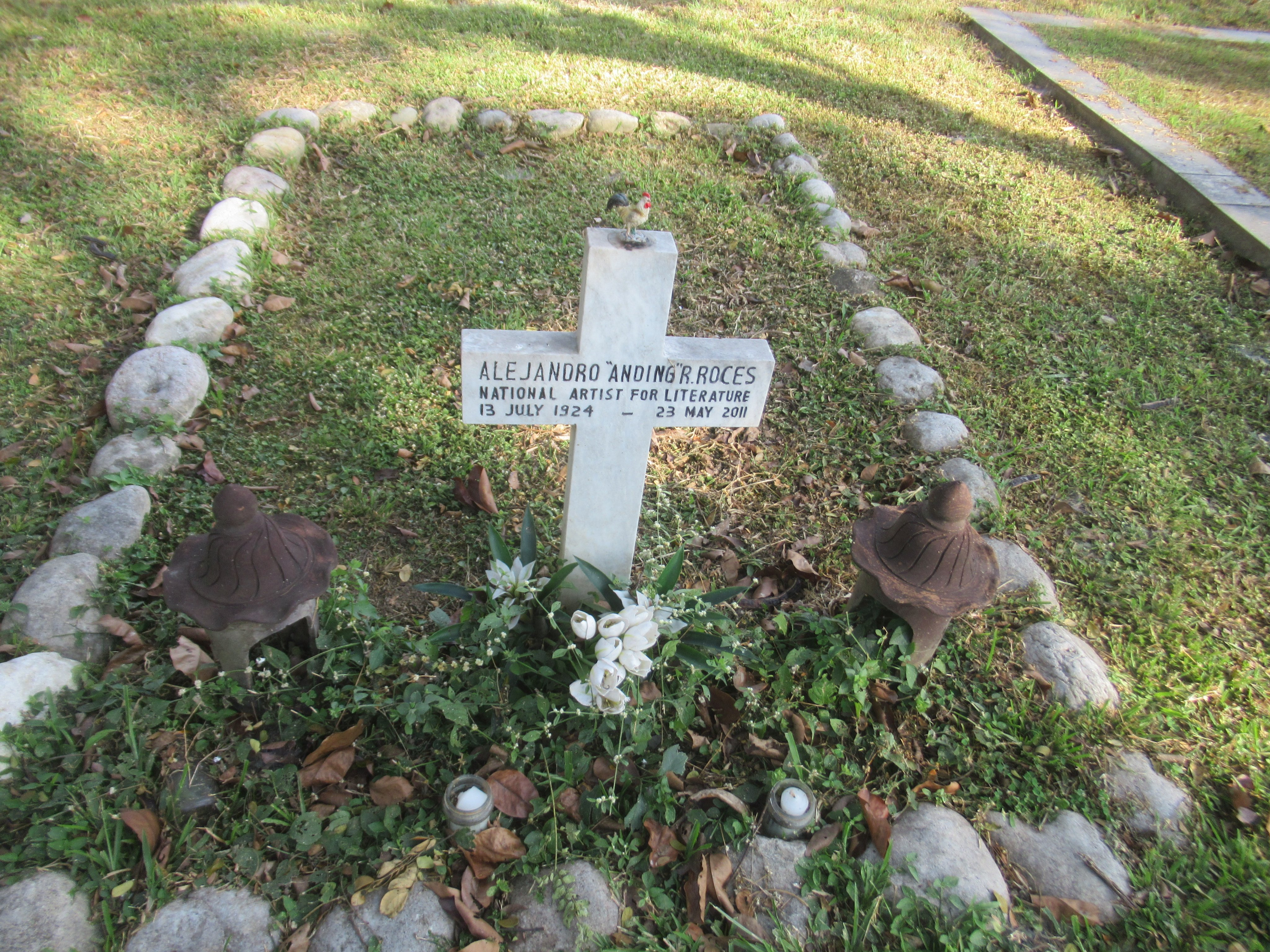
Roces' grave at the Libingan ng mga Bayani.

Through the years, Roces has won numerous awards, including the Patnubay ng Sining at Kalinangan Award, the Diwa ng Lahi Award, the Tanging Parangal of the Gawad CCP Para sa Sining, and the Rizal Pro Patria Award. He was finally bestowed the honor as National Artist of Literature on 25 June 2003.

When once asked for a piece of advice on becoming a famous literary figure Roces said, "You cannot be a great writer; first, you have to be a good person".

In 1994, Roces was the chair of the Board of Jurors for the 1994 Metro Manila Film Festival, in which he and the board made the unprecedented decision not to award any film entry that year six of the major awards, including Best Picture, Best Screenplay and Best Director.
