= 2005 Nobel Peace Prize =

- Mohamed ElBaradei and International Atomic Energy Agency (IAEA)
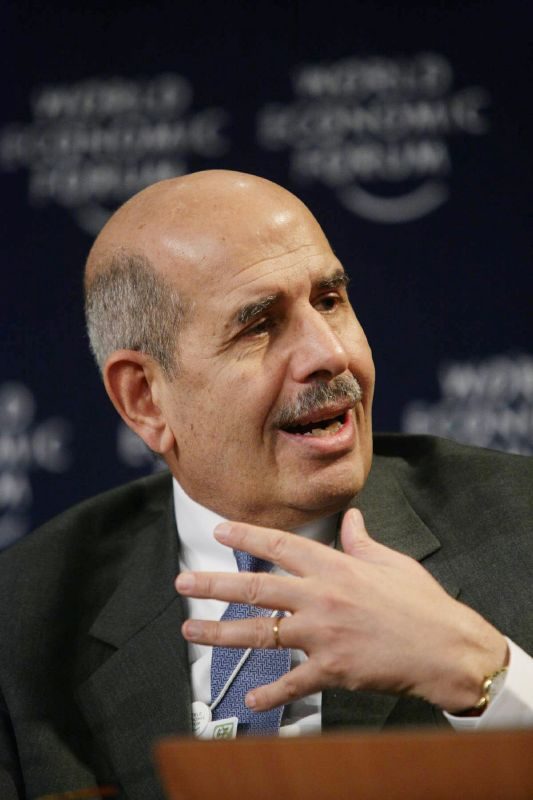
- ElBaradei (pictured) and IAEA "for their efforts to prevent nuclear energy from being used for military purposes and to ensure that nuclear energy for peaceful purposes is used in the safest possible way."
- Date: 7 October 2005 (announcement by Ole Danbolt Mjøs); 10 December 2005 (ceremony)
- Location: Oslo, Norway
- Presented by: Norwegian Nobel Committee
- Reward: 10 million SEK ($1.5M)
- First award: 1901
- Website: Official website

The 2005 Nobel Peace Prize was awarded to International Atomic Energy Agency and Mohamed ElBaradei "for their efforts to prevent nuclear energy from being used for military purposes and to ensure that nuclear energy for peaceful purposes is used in the safest possible way".

== Overview ==
United Nations Secretary-General Kofi Annan said he was delighted that the 2005 Nobel Peace Prize had been awarded to the UN nuclear watchdog and its head ElBaradei. "The secretary-general congratulates him and the entire staff of the agency, past and present, on their contributions to global peace," a spokesman for Annan said.

In his Nobel speech, ElBaradei said that the changing landscape of nuclear non-proliferation and disarmament may be defined by the emergence of an extensive black market in nuclear material and equipment, the proliferation of nuclear weapons and sensitive nuclear technology, and the stagnation in nuclear disarmament. To combat proliferation, ElBaradei has suggested keeping nuclear and radiological material out of the hands of extremist groups, tightening control over the operations for producing the nuclear material that could be used in weapons, and accelerating disarmament efforts. Dr. ElBaradei also stated that only 1% of the money spent on developing new weapons would be enough to feed the entire world and that, if we hope to escape self-destruction, then nuclear weapons should have no place in our collective conscience, and no role in our security.
