= 1903 Nobel Prize in Literature =

- Bjørnstjerne Bjørnson
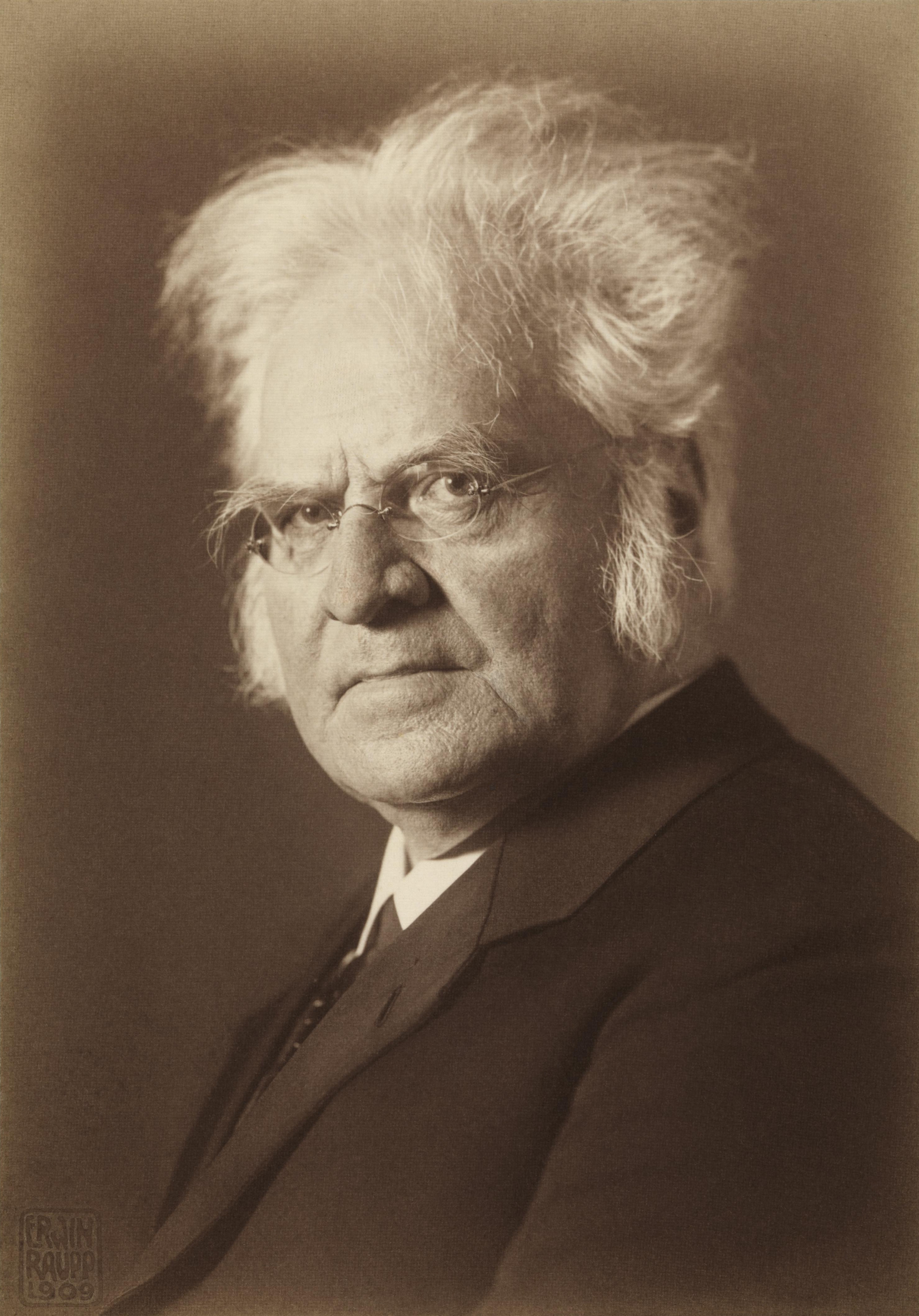
- "as a tribute to his noble, magnificent and versatile poetry, which has always been distinguished by both the freshness of its inspiration and the rare purity of its spirit."
- Date: 19 November 1903 (announcement); 10 December 1903 (ceremony)
- Location: Stockholm, Sweden
- Presented by: Swedish Academy
- First award: 1901
- Website: Official website

The 1903 Nobel Prize in Literature was the third prestigious literary prize based upon Alfred Nobel's will. It was awarded to the Norwegian poet and politician Bjørnstjerne Bjørnson (1832–1910) "as a tribute to his noble, magnificent and versatile poetry, which has always been distinguished by both the freshness of its inspiration and the rare purity of its spirit." The prize was announced in October 8, 1903 and was given in December 10, 1903 at Stockholm.

== Laureate ==
Bjørnson was a Norwegian multifaceted literary person who became one of the original members of the Norwegian Nobel Committee, that awards the Nobel Peace Prize, where he sat from 1901 to 1906. He wrote poetry, drama and lyrical poetry. He worked for periods as theater director in both Bergen and Oslo, and he was active both politically and as a journalist. In his early works he depicted peasant life in the Norwegian countryside. This national romanticism was also found in his poetry throughout his career, even if he also wrote both realistic and symbolic dramas. Bjørnson's musical version of the poem "Ja, vi elsker dette landet" became Norway's national anthem. He is also considered to be one of the four great Norwegian writers, alongside Henrik Ibsen, Jonas Lie, and Alexander Kielland.

== Deliberations ==
=== Nominations ===
The Swedish Academy received four nominations – two nominations each in 1902 and 1903 – for Bjørnstjerne Bjørnson before getting awarded.

In total, the Nobel Committee received 43 nominations for 25 writers in 1903, including repeated nominations for the Russian novelist Leo Tolstoy (four nominations) and Norwegian playwright Henrik Ibsen (one nomination), and with new nominations for the English writers Algernon Charles Swinburne and Rudyard Kipling (one nominations each). Kipling would later be awarded in 1907. French writer Anatole France and Fredrik Wulff were the first nominators to nominate a collective group of writers purposely for a shared prize. France nominated Tolstoy, Brandes, and Maeterlinck in one nomination, whereas Wulff nominated Paris and Mistral together.

The authors Ada Ellen Bayly, Nicolaas Beets, Eugenio María de Hostos, Girolamo de Rada, Frederic Farrar, George Gissing, William Ernest Henley, Ernest Legouvé, Vicente Fidel López, Evgeny Markov, Mary Anne Sadlier, Joseph Henry Shorthouse, Joseph Skipsey, Carl Snoilsky, Richard Henry Stoddard, Aleksandr Sukhovo-Kobylin, Wilhelm von Polenz, Sydir Vorobkevych, Otto Weininger, Josefina Wettergrund died in 1903 without having been nominated for the prize.

Official list of nominees and their nominators for the prize
No.	Nominee	Country	Genre(s)	Nominator(s)
1	Alexander Baumgartner (1841–1910)	Switzerland	poetry, history	Knud Karl Krogh-Tonning (1842–1911)
2	Bjørnstjerne Bjørnson (1832–1910)	Norway	poetry, novel, drama, short story	Werner Söderhjelm (1859–1931); Karl Johan Warburg (1852–1918)
3	Georg Brandes (1842–1927)	Denmark	literary criticism, essays	Troels Frederik Lund (1840–1921); Harald Høffding (1843–1931); Vilhelm Thomsen (1842–1927); Edvard Holm (1833–1915); Sophus Müller (1846–1934); Marcus Rubin (1854–1923); Ludvig Wimmer (1839–1920); julius Albert Fridericia (1849–1912); Finnur Jónsson (1858–1934); Kristian Erslev (1852–1930); Peter Christian Kålund (1844–1919); Alfred Lehmann (1858–1921); Frants Buhl (1850–1932); Johan Ludvig Heiberg (1854–1928); Kristoffer Nyrop (1858–1931); Otto Jespersen (1860–1943); Martin Clarentius Gertz (1844–1929); Viggo Fausböll (1821–1908); Anatole France (1844–1924)
4	Giosuè Carducci (1835–1907)	Italy	poetry, literary criticism, biography, essays	Vittorio Puntoni (1859–1926)
5	François Coppée (1842–1908)	France	poetry, novel, short story, drama	Sully Prudhomme (1839–1907)
6	Robert Langton Douglas (1864–1951)	Great Britain	history, essays	Thomas Hodgkin (1831–1913)
7	José Echegaray Eizaguirre (1832–1916)	Spain	drama	Daniel de Cortázar Larrubia (1844–1927)
8	Iwan Gilkin (1858–1924)	Belgium	poetry	Eugène Goblet d'Alviella (1846–1925); Ernest Discailles (1837–1914); Thomas Joseph Lamy (1827–1907)
9	Carl Friedrich Glasenapp (1847–1915)	Germany	biography	Aleksandr Nelidov (1838–1910); Gabriel Monod (1844–1912); Antoni Rubió i Lluch (1856–1937); Kuno Fischer (1824–1907); Henry Thode (1857–1920); Adolf Stern (1835–1907); Felix Dahn (1834–1912); Wolfgang Golther (1863–1945); Houston Stewart Chamberlain (1855–1927); Arseny Golenishchev-Kutuzov (1848–1913); Andreĭ Aleksandrovich Saburov (1837–1916); Nikodim Kondakov (1844–1925); Anatoly Koni (1844–1927); Grand Duke Konstantin Konstantinovich of Russia (1858–1915); Pavel Jankovsky (–)
10	Henrik Ibsen (1828–1906)	Norway	drama	Lorentz Dietrichson (1834–1917)
11	Rudyard Kipling (1865–1936)	Great Britain	short story, novel, poetry	Edwin Arnold (1832–1904)
12	Maurice Maeterlinck (1862–1949)	Belgium	drama, poetry, essays	Anatole France (1844–1924)
13	Marcelino Menéndez Pelayo (1856–1912)	Spain	history, philosophy, philology, poetry, translation, literary criticism	Francisco Commelerán Gómez (1848–1919); Miguel Mir Noguera (1841–1912)
14	George Meredith (1828–1909)	Great Britain	novel, poetry	Nobel Prize Committee of the Society of Authors
15	Frédéric Mistral (1830–1914)	France	poetry, philology	Fredrik Wulff (1845–1930); Carl Wahlund (1846–1913); Per Geijer (1886–1976); Gaston Paris (1839–1903)
16	Lewis Morris (1833–1907)	Great Britain	poetry, songwriting, essays	Herbert Warren (1853–1930); John Rhys (1840–1915); Thomas Fowler (1832–1904)
17	Gaspar Núñez de Arce (1832–1903)	Spain	poetry, drama, law	Mariano Catalina Cobo (1842–1913); Juan Valera y Alcalá-Galiano (1824–1905); Enrique de Saavedra Duque de Rivas (1828–1914)
18	Gaston Paris (1839–1903)	France	history, poetry, essays	Fredrik Wulff (1845–1930)
19	Paul Sabatier (1858–1928)	France	history, theology, biography	Carl Bildt (1850–1931)
20	Henryk Sienkiewicz (1846–1916)	Russia (Poland)	novel	Hans Hildebrand (1842–1913)
21	Albert Sorel (1842–1906)	France	history, essays	Albert Vandal (1853–1910)
22	Algernon Charles Swinburne (1837–1909)	Great Britain	poetry, drama, literary criticism, novel	Nobel Prize Committee of the Society of Authors
23	Leo Tolstoy (1828–1910)	Russia	novel, short story, drama, poetry	Anatole France (1844–1924); Marcellin Berthelot (1827–1907); Ludovic Halévy (1837–1908)
24	Charles Wagner (1852–1918)	France	theology, philosophy	Gabriel Jean Séailles (1852–1922)

=== Prize decision ===
The Nobel committee proposed that the 1903 Nobel Prize in Literature should be awarded to the Norwegian author Bjørnstjerne Bjørnson. His countryman Henrik Ibsen was also considered as a favoured candidate. A shared prize to Bjørnson and Ibsen was proposed but rejected by the committee. Ibsen was regarded as "too old and burn-out", while Bjørnson was considered to still be "in full vigour". The committee said in their report to the Swedish Academy that Bjørnson's "ingenious and world-famous poetry, which has deep roots in nature and folk life, but also in his own strong convictions, combines ethical and poetic soundness; so the Nobel Committee has deemed it appropriate to propose to the Academy to pay tribute to his bright genius by awarding him the Nobel Prize unstruck."

In their report the Nobel committee also mentioned the subsequently awarded authors, Italian Giosuè Carducci, Spanish José Echegaray, Polish Henryk Sienkiewicz and French Frédéric Mistral as worthy candidates for the prize. Other writers considered but rejected for the 1903 prize included Belgian Maurice Maeterlinck (awarded in 1911), Danish Georg Brandes, English Algernon Charles Swinburne and Russian Leo Tolstoy. The French historian Albert Sorel was praised as a worthy candidate for the prize, but was ruled out as the committee found it inappropriate to award an historian for a second year in succession. On the candidacy of Rudyard Kipling, who was eventually awarded the prize in 1907, the committee chose to await works "of greater maturity, purer beauty, and a less hurried manner" by the young writer still only in his thirties.

On rumours of a shared prize to Bjørnstjerne Bjørnson and Henrik Ibsen, Bjørnson told Norwegian reporters that he would refuse a shared prize. While the Nobel committee had rejected the proposal of a shared prize to them, thinking it would likely be misunderstood as two distinguished authors being worthy of only half a prize, the committee took notice of Bjørnson's statement and, on the event that Bjørnson should decline the award, recommended that the prize alternatively should be awarded to Frédéric Mistral (who was awarded the following year).
