= List of Catholic priests and religious awarded the Nobel Prize =

Catholic priests and religious awarded the Nobel Prize

The following is a list of Catholic bishops, priests and religious who were awarded and nominated for the Nobel Prize.

== Laureates ==
Year	Image	Laureate	Born	Died	Field	Citation	Nominator(s)
1958		Georges Pire, O.P. (religious name: Dominique)	10 February 1910; Dinant, Namur, Belgium	30 January 1969; Leuven, Flemish Brabant, Belgium	Peace	"for his efforts to help refugees to leave their camps and return to a life of freedom and dignity."	Fernand Dehousse (1906–1976); E. de la Vallé (?); Paul van Zeeland (1893–1973)
1979		Anjezë Gonxhe Bojaxhiu, M.C. (religious name: Mother Teresa)	26 August 1910; Skopje, North Macedonia	5 September 1997; Kolkata, West Bengal, India	Peace	"for her work for bringing help to suffering humanity."	
1996		Carlos Filipe Ximenes Belo, S.D.B.	3 February 1948; Vemasse, Baucau, East Timor		Peace	"for their work towards a just and peaceful solution to the conflict in East Timor." (awarded together with East Timorese politician José Ramos-Horta)	Hilton Deakin, D.D. (b. 1932)
2007		Jose Ramon Villarin, S.J. (Note: Villarin, through his work on greenhouse gas emissions, was a member of the Intergovernmental Panel on Climate Change (IPCC) since the 1990s which, shared with U.S. Vice President Al Gore, received the 2007 Nobel Peace Prize.)	30 January 1960; Manila, Philippines		Peace	Intergovernmental Panel on Climate Change (IPCC) and Al Gore (b. 1948) "for their efforts to build up and disseminate greater knowledge about man-made climate change, and to lay the foundations for the measures that are needed to counteract such change."	

== Nominees ==
Image	Laureate	Born	Died	Years Nominated	Citation	Nominator(s)
Physics
	Georges Lemaître	17 July 1894; Charleroi, Hainut, Belgium	20 June 1966; Leuven, Flemish Brabant, Belgium	1954	"for his prediction of the expanding universe."	Alexandre Dauvillier (1882–1979)
Chemistry
	Jean-Baptiste Senderens	27 January 1856; Barbachen, Hautes-Pyrénées, France	26 September 1937; Barbachen, Hautes-Pyrénées, France	1909, 1928, 1929	"for his work on the catalytic hydrogenation of organic species in the presence of metals with Paul Sabatier."	Georges Lemoine (1841–1922); Eyvind Bødtker (1867–1932)
	Georges Lemaître	17 July 1894; Charleroi, Hainut, Belgium	20 June 1966; Leuven, Flemish Brabant, Belgium	1956	"for his primeval atom theory (Big Bang theory)."	Don Yost (1893–1977)
Literature
	Alexander Baumgartner, S.J.	27 June 1841; St. Gallen, Switzerland	5 October 1910; Luxembourg City, Luxembourg	1901, 1902, 1903		Knud Karl Krogh-Tonning (1842–1911)
	Hartmann Grisar, S.J.	September 22, 1845; Koblenz, Germany	February 25, 1932; Innsbruck, Austria	1902		Knud Karl Krogh-Tonning (1842–1911)
	Andrés Manjón y Manjón (Note: Manjón's beatification cause was initiated in April 1948 and was declared a "Venerable" on 23 November 2020.)	30 November 1846; Sargentes de la Lora, Burgos, Spain	10 July 1923; Granada, Spain	1907		Ángel Sánchez-Rubio Ibáñez (1852–1910)
	József Martoncsik, O.Praem (religious name: Mécs László)	17 January 1895; Kostoľany nad Hornádom, Košice, Slovakia	9 November 1978; Pannonhalma, Győr-Moson-Sopron, Hungary	1969, 1970		Watson Kirkconnell (1895–1977)
	Miquel Melendres i Rué	11 March 1902; Girona, Spain	10 March 1974; Tarragona, Spain	1971		Antoni Griera i Gaja (1887–1973)
	Ernesto Cardenal (Note: Because of his involvement in politics, he was prohibited from administering the sacraments in 1984 by Pope John Paul II. He was rehabilitated later by Pope Francis in 2019.)	20 January 1925; Granada, Nicaragua	1 March 2020; Managua, Nicaragua	2005		
Peace
	Johann Martin Schleyer	18 July 1831; Lauda-Königshofen, Baden-Württemberg, Germany	16 August 1912; Konstanz, Baden-Württemberg, Germany	1902	"for having constructed the artificial language Volapük (1880)."	Prince Alfred of Liechtenstein (1842–1907)
	Pope Benedict XV (baptismal name: Giacomo della Chiesa)	21 November 1854; Pegli, Genoa, Italy	22 January 1922; Rome, Italy	1915, 1916, 1920	"for his peace efforts and his work to ensure that prisoners of war were treated humanely."	Ferenc Kemény (1860–1944); J. Kadlcák (?); Albert Berzeviczy (1853–1936); George Noble Plunkett (1851–1948)
	Cardinal Pietro Gasparri	5 May 1852; Ussita, Macerata, Italy	18 November 1934; Rome, Italy	1919, 1920	"for having written the papal peace plan and encouraged people to strive for peace through the papal guidelines for peace and understanding."	Hans Reichel (Note: The nominator suspected that Benedict XV as reigning pope would not be taken into consideration, and therefore he nominated Gasparri instead.) (?)
	Cardinal Désiré-Joseph Mercier	21 November 1851; Braine-l'Alleud, Walloon Brabant, Belgium	23 January 1926; Brussels, Belgium	1920	"for standing against the Germans when they burned the Louvain Library and deported workmen during the war, making him an international spokesman for the Belgians."	Paul Fauchille (1858–1926)
	Robert Jacquinot de Besange, S.J.	15 March 1878; Saintes, Charente-Maritime, France	10 September 1946; Berlin, Germany	1939	"for setting up safety zones that saved over half a million Chinese people during the Second Sino-Japanese War."	Jules Basdevant (1877–1968)
	Pope Pius XI (Note: Pope Pius XI died in February 1939 making him ineligible for the peace prize.) (baptismal name: Ambrogio Ratti)	31 May 1857; Desio, Monza e Brianza Italy	10 February 1939; Vatican City	1939	"for his efforts to end the harsh dictatorships in fascist Italy, Nazi Germany, and the Soviet Union."	Romualdo Silva Cortes (1880–1958)
	Pope Pius XII (Note: Pope Pius XII was declared a "Venerable" on 19 December 2009.) (baptismal name: Eugenio Maria Pacelli)	2 March 1876; Rome, Italy	9 October 1958; Castel Gandolfo, Rome, Italy	1947, 1948	"for his peace work during and after World War II."	Dionisio Anzilotti (1867–1950); Giuseppe Caronia (1884–1977)
	Georges Pire, O.P. (religious name: Dominique)	10 February 1910; Dinant, Namur, Belgium	30 January 1969; Leuven, Flemish Brabant, Belgium	1957, 1958	"for his work to aid refugees in Europe and for his idea of creating homes for elderly refugees by making European villages is very original, but very practical."	Fernand Dehousse (1906–1976); E. de la Vallé (?); Paul van Zeeland (1893–1973)
	Philippus van Straaten, O.Praem (religious name: Werenfried)	17 January 1913; Mijdrecht, Utrecht, Netherlands	13 January 2003; Bad Soden, Hesse, Germany	1959	"for his work with helping clerical refugees from Eastern Europe."	Ferdinand de Waele (1896–1977)
	Félix Kir	22 January 1876; Alise-Sainte-Reine, Côte-d'Or, France	26 April 1968; Dijon, Côte-d'Or, France	1960, 1961	"for his work with mutual 'adoption' of cities around the world."	Charles Dutheil (1897–1970)
	Pope Paul VI (Note: Pope Paul VI was canonized as a saint on 14 October 2018 at the Saint Peter's Square, Vatican City by Pope Francis.) (baptismal name: Giovanni Battista Montini).	26 September 1897; Concesio, Brescia, Italy	6 August 1978; Castel Gandolfo, Rome, Italy	1965, 1967	"for his efforts for universal reconciliation, shown in various statements that was given during his visit to Jordan and Israel."	5 professors from the University of Montreal; José Maria Gil-Robles (1898–1980)
	Cardinal Joseph Leo Cardijn (Note: Cardinal Cardijn's cause for beatification has been initiated in 2014. He is designated with the title "Servant of God".)	13 November 1882; Schaerbeek, Belgium	24 July 1967; Leuven, Flemish Brabant, Belgium	1966	"for his great achievements for the cause of peace through the worldwide establishment of the movement he founded, the Young Christian Workers, and his untiring quest for universal brotherhood resting on social justice."	Salvino Busuttil (1936–2016); members of the Maltese Parliament
	Henri Marie Grouès, O.F.M.Cap (religious name: Abbé Pierre)	5 August 1912; Lyon, Rhône, France	22 January 2007; Paris, France	1967	"for having inspired universal solidarity through the Emmaus movement, which helps thousands of poor, homeless people and refugees."	Bodil Koch (1903–1972); Poul Hartling (1914–2000); Julius Bomholt (1896–1969)
	Vicenç Ferrer Moncho, S.J.	9 April 1920; Barcelona, Spain	19 June 2009; Anantapur, Andhra Pradesh, India	1968	"for having uplifted the poor and exploited by means of education and self-help projects and having revitalized an ever-widening area of famine-threatened India with a movement based on the most fundamental of human values, a most significant contribution to the achievement of peace in our age, uplifting the poor and exploited by means of education and self-help projects."	Francis X. Murphy (1914–2002)
	Archbp. Hélder Câmara	7 February 1909; Fortaleza, Ceará, Brazil	27 August 1999; Recife, Pernambuco, Brazil	1970, 1971, 1973	"for his unique role in one of the poorest areas of Latin-America as a leader of the progressive minority of the Catholic Church and leading spokesman for non-violent methods to further social change where has played an important international role by contributing to a greater understanding in industrialized countries of the social reality in one of the poorest areas in the world"	Brendan Corish (1918–1990); 14 members of the Irish parliament; Liam Cosgrave (1920–2017); Bram van der Lek (1931–2013); members of the Swedish Parliament; Evert en Herman Kraaijvanger (1899–1978); members of the French parliament and professors; René Cassin (1887–1976); members of the Dutch parliament; Walter Ralston Martin (1928–1989); Dietrich Rollmann (1932–2008); Martin Bullinger (1930–2021); Marie Lous Mohr (1892–1973); Bruno Kreisky (1911–1990); Josef Müller (1898–1979); Albert Burger (1925–1981); American Friends Service Committee
	Stefan Wyszyński	3 August 1901; Zuzela, Ostrów Mazowiecka, Poland	28 May 1981; Warsaw, Poland	1971	"for his efforts to mediate disputes and prevent violence which could have had tragic consequences for social order and peace."	Stanley Haidasz (1923–2009)
	Bp. Donal Lamont, O.Carm	27 July 1911; Ballycastle, Ulster, Ireland	14 August 2003; Dublin, Ireland	1978	"for his outspoken criticism against the racist policies of the Smith regime in Rhodesia."	
	Archbp. Óscar Romero (Note: Archbishop Romero was canonized a saint on 14 October 2018 at Saint Peter's Square, Vatican City by Pope Francis.)	15 August 1917; Ciudad Barrios, San Miguel, El Salvador	24 March 1980; San Salvador, El Salvador	1978, 1979	"for defending human rights and freedom of the people, and denouncing the social injustices and military dictatorship in El Salvador."	118 members of the British Parliament; 26 members of the United States Congress
	Aloysius Schwartz (Note: Fr. Al Schwartz was declared a "Venerable" on 22 January 2015.)	18 September 1930; Washington, D.C., United States	16 March 1992; Manila, Philippines	1984, 1992	"for his ministry to thousands of poor children around the world."	Bob Dornan (b. 1933)
	Archbp. Elias Chacour	29 November 1939; Kafr Bir'im, Upper Galilee, Palestine		1988, 1989, 1994	"for his efforts in educating Palestinians, Jews, and Muslims on reconciliation and non-violent change in Israeli society."	
	Maria Rita de Souza Pontes, S.M.I.C. (Note: Irmã Dulce was canonized a saint on 13 October 2019 at the Saint Peter's Square, Vatican City by Pope Francis.) (religious name: Dulce)	26 May 1914; Salvador, Bahia, Brazil	13 March 1992; Salvador, Bahia, Brazil	1988, 1992	"for her tireless caring of the poor and defending the rights of workers in Bahia.	José Sarney (b. 1930); Queen Silvia of Sweden (b. 1943)
	Bp. Antonio Fortich	11 August 1913; Negros Oriental, Philippines	2 July 2003; Negros Occidental, Philippines	1989	"for being a strong advocate of the rights of the poor and a critic of an unjust social economic system."	American Friends Service Committee; 21 members of the British Parliament
