= 1905 Nobel Prize in Literature =

- Henryk Sienkiewicz
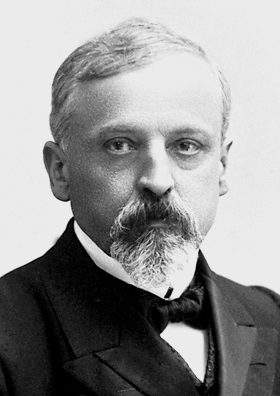
- "because of his outstanding merits as an epic writer."
- Date: 9 November 1905 (announcement); 10 December 1905 (ceremony)
- Location: Stockholm, Sweden
- Presented by: Swedish Academy
- First award: 1901
- Website: Official website

The 1905 Nobel Prize in Literature was awarded to the Polish novelist Henryk Sienkiewicz (1846–1916) "because of his outstanding merits as an epic writer." He was given the prize on 10 December 1905. He is the first Polish author to win the Nobel Prize in the literary category and the second Polish citizen to win in general after the chemist Maria Skłodowska Curie in 1903. He was followed by Władysław Reymont in 1924.

== Laureate ==
Henryk Sienkiewicz is best known for his epic historical novels. He began writing them during the 1880s and published them as serial installments in Polish newspapers. Comprehensive historical studies formed as the basis for his great trilogy of Polish life during the mid-17th century: Ogniem i mieczem ("With Fire and Sword", 1884), Potop ("The Deluge", 1886) and Wołodyjowski ("Fire in the Steppe", 1888). The trilogy intertwines facts, fiction and a strong patriotic undertone. His best-known novel is Quo Vadis (1895), a story of St. Peter in Rome in the reign of Emperor Nero.

== Deliberations ==
=== Nominations ===
Sienkiewicz was first nominated in 1901. Since then he has been annually nominated by literary scholars and academic for his epic oeuvres. In 1905, he was nominated by Hans Hildebrand, an archeologist and member of the Swedish Academy.

In total, the academy received 35 nominations for 15 writers such as the Russian novelist Leo Tolstoy, British poet Algernon Charles Swinburne and writer Rudyard Kipling (awarded in 1907), Czech poet Jaroslav Vrchlický, French historian Albert Sorel, and British essayist John Morley. Two of the nominees were women, Polish novelist Eliza Orzeszkowa and Swedish author Selma Lagerlöf (awarded in 1909). John Macmillan Brown, a Scottish-New Zealand academic, administrator and promoter of education for women, nominated himself under the pseudonym Godfrey Sweven.

The authors Alphonse Allais, Rudolf Baumbach, Victor Daley, Julius de Geyter, José-Maria de Heredia, Otto Erich Hartleben, Hermann Lingg, Mirra Lokhvitskaya, George MacDonald, Paul Meurice, Balduin Möllhausen, Vjenceslav Novak, Manuel Reina Montilla, William Sharp, Amalie Skram, Julius Stinde, Debendranath Tagore, Juan Valera y Alcalá-Galiano, Jules Verne, and Lew Wallace died in 1905 without having been nominated for the prize.

Official list of nominees and their nominators for the prize
No.	Nominee	Country	Genre(s)	Nominator(s)
1	Demetrios Bernardakis (1833–1907)	Greece	drama, history, essays	Athanasios Vernardakis (1844–1912) (Note: Athanasios Bernardakis [Vernardakis] is the brother of Demetrios Bernardakis.)
2	Georg Brandes (1842–1927)	Denmark	literary criticism, essays	Troels Frederik Lund (1840–1921)
3	Giosuè Carducci (1835–1907)	Italy	poetry, literary criticism, biography, essays	Johan Vising (1855–1942); Carl Bildt (1850–1931)
4	Rudyard Kipling (1865–1936)	Great Britain	short story, novel, poetry	William John Loftie (1839–1911)
5	Selma Lagerlöf (1858–1940)	Sweden	novel, short story	Fredrik Wulff (1845–1930); Valfrid Vasenius (1848–1928); Adolf Noreen (1854–1925); Anton Christian Bang (1840–1913)
6	Marcelino Menéndez Pelayo (1856–1912)	Spain	history, philosophy, philology, poetry, translation, literary criticism	24 members of the Royal Spanish Academy (Note: The nomination was made in three separate letters by 24 members of the Royal Spanish Academy (the members were: Luis Pidal y Mon (1842–1913), Eduardo Saavedra (1829–1912), José María Asensio (1829–1905), Jacinto Octavio Picón (1852–1923), José Ortega Munilla (1856–1922), Juan Antonio Cavestany (1861–1924), Emilio Alcalá-Galiano (1831–1914), Juan José Herranz (1839–1912), Francisco Silvela (1843–1905), Juan Valera y Alcalá-Galiano (1824–1905), Cipriano Muñoz y Manzano (1862–1933), Francisco Commelerán y Gómez (1848–1919), Benito Pérez Galdós (1843–1920), Miguel Mir (1841–1912), Francisco Fernández y González (1833–1917), Santiago de Liniers y Gallo Alcántara (1842–1908), Eduardo de Hinojosa y Naveros (1852–1919), Antonio Maura Montaner (1853–1925), Alejandro Pidal y Mon (1846–1913), Eugenio Sellés (1842–1926), Eduardo Benot (1822–1907), Antonio Hernández Fajarnés (1851–1909), Ramón Menéndez Pidal (1869–1968), Daniel Cortázar y Larrubia (1844–1927), Enrique Ramírez de Saavedra (1828–1914), José Echegaray (1832–1916), Raimundo Fernández-Villaverde (1848–1905), Manuel del Palacio (1831–1906), Emilio Cotarelo (1857–1936), Mariano Catalina (1842–1913), and José María de Pereda (1833–1906).))
7	John Morley (1838–1923)	Great Britain	biography, literary criticism, essays	John Lubbock, 1st Baron Avebury (1858–1929)
8	Lewis Morris (1833–1907)	Great Britain	poetry, songwriting, essays	William Morris Colles (1855–1926)
9	Eliza Orzeszkowa (1841–1910)	Russia (Poland)	novel, short story	Antoni Kalina (1846–1905); Jooseppi Julius Mikkola (1866–1946); Alexander Brückner (1856–1939); 5 professors from Jagiellonian University; Gotthilf Leonhard Masing (1845–1936); Jan Baudouin de Courtenay (1845–1929); Leon Szepielewicz (1863–1909); Józef Kallenbach (1861–1929); Jan Łoś (1860–1928)
10	Henryk Sienkiewicz (1846–1916)	Russia (Poland)	novel	Hans Hildebrand (1842–1913)
11	Albert Sorel (1842–1906)	France	history, essays	Gabriel Hanotaux (1853–1944) (Note: The nomination was made jointly by Gabriel Hanotaux and 24 other members of the French Academy.); René Bazin (1853–1932); Albert Vandal (1853–1910); Frédéric Masson (1847–1923)
12	Godfrey Sweven (Note: Macmillan Brown: Limanora, the Island of Progress (1903)) (1845–1935)	Great Britain; New Zealand	novel, essays, pedagogy	John Macmillan Brown (1845–1935) (Note: John Macmillan Brown has only been nominated himself under the pseudonym Godfrey Sweven. This nomination was later declared invalid by the Nobel Committee because nomination of oneself is not permitted.)
13	Algernon Charles Swinburne (1837–1909)	Great Britain	poetry, drama, literary criticism, novel	Frank Evers Beddard (1858–1925) (Note: The nomination was made jointly by Frank E. Beddard and 30 other members of the English Society of Authors.)
14	Leo Tolstoy (1828–1910)	Russia	novel, short story, drama, poetry	Carl Gustaf Estlander (1834–1910) (Note: The nomination was made by Carl Gustaf Estlander and 16 other members of the Finnish Society of Sciences.); Andreas Aubert (1851–1913); Marcellin Berthelot (1827–1907); Ludovic Halévy (1837–1908); Eugène-Melchior de Vogüé (1848–1910)
15	Jaroslav Vrchlický (1853–1912)	Austria-Hungary (Czechoslovakia)	poetry, drama, translation	Royal Academy of Science, Letters and Fine Arts of Belgium; František Pastrnek (1853–1940); Arnošt Kraus (1859–1943)

== Prize decision ==
For the prize in 1905 Henryk Sienkiewicz competed against another Polish writer, Eliza Orzeszkowa. A shared prize between the two was considered but rejected. The prize had been shared the year before and the Nobel committee had concernes that awarding shared prizes would reduce the prestigiousness of the prize.

In their report to the Swedish Academy dated 25 September 1905, the Nobel committee described Henryk Sienkiewicz and Eliza Orzezkowa both as prominent writers, but found Sienkiewicz the superior author, citing him as "perhaps the greatest master in the field of the historical novel at present". Two members of the Nobel committee proposed a shared prize to Sienkiewicz and Orzezkowa, but ultimately the five member committee unanimously proposed that Henryk Sienkiewicz undivided should be awarded the prize.

Of the other considered candidates, the Nobel committee found French historian Albert Sorel "well worthy of a Nobel prize", but was reluctant to again award a historian following the recently awarded prize to Theodor Mommsen in 1902 and also had concerns of being viewed as favouring French writers over authors from other nations, as two French authors had recently been awarded the prize in 1901 and 1904. English poet Algernon Charles Swinburne, Italian poet Giosuè Carducci (subsequently awarded the 1906 Nobel Prize in Literature) and Russian novelist Leo Tolstoy were rejected on the grounds that they were not found to represent the required "ideal direction" outlined in prize donor Alfred Nobel's will.

On 9 November 1905, the Swedish Academy decided that that year's Nobel Prize in Literature should be awarded to Henryk Sienkiewicz "because of his outstanding merits as an epic writer."

== Reactions ==
It is often incorrectly asserted that Sienkiewicz received his Nobel Prize for Quo Vadis. While Quo Vadis is the novel that brought him international fame, the Nobel Prize does not name any particular novel, instead citing "his outstanding merits as an epic writer". In his acceptance speech, he said this honor was of particular value to a son of Poland: "She was pronounced dead – yet here is proof that she lives on... She was pronounced defeated – and here is proof that she is victorious."

According to Burton Feldman, the Nobel judges needed only nine years to honour Sienkiewicz for his Quo Vadis – "displacing Tolstoy," claimed a Nobel evaluator. Sienkiewicz's Quo Vadis appeared in 1896 and over the next few decades sold millions of copies. The Nobel judges have often been greatly impressed by the international popularity of a writer and was awarded thereafter.
