= 1902 Nobel Prize in Literature =

- Theodor Mommsen
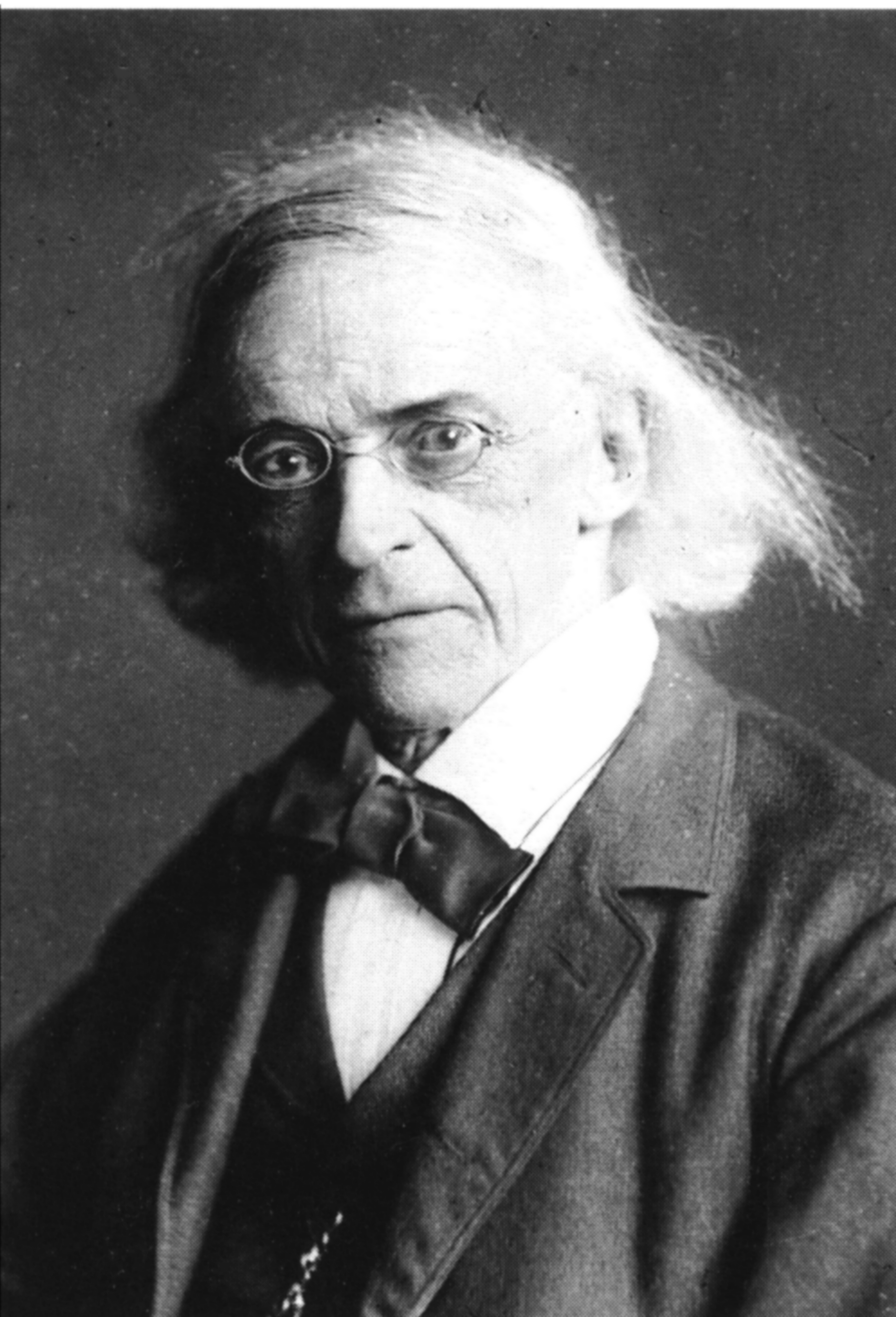
- "the greatest living master of the art of historical writing, with special reference to his monumental work A History of Rome."
- Date: 13 November 1902 (announcement); 10 December 1902 (ceremony)
- Location: Stockholm, Sweden
- Presented by: Swedish Academy
- First award: 1901
- Website: Official website

The 1902 Nobel Prize in Literature was the second prestigious literary award based upon Alfred Nobel's will, which was given to German historian Theodor Mommsen (1817–1903) "the greatest living master of the art of historical writing, with special reference to his monumental work A History of Rome."

== Laureate ==
Theodor Mommsen was a writer and expert both in history and law, and this combination was important for his research career. His Nobel Prize was motivated primarily by his pioneering three-volume work about Roman history, Römische Geschichte. It depicted different aspects of the Roman Republic's history: political, legal, economic, cultural and even geographical and meteorological. According to the Swedish Academy, his writing was "vivid and empathetic", and it was for these literary qualities that he was awarded the Nobel Prize.

=== A History of Rome ===
A notebook used by Theodore Mommsen for his Römische Geschichte or History of Rome.

When Mommsen was awarded the prize, the world recognition was given him with "special reference" to the Römische Geschichte (the History of Rome). The award came nearly fifty years after the first appearance of the work. The award also came during the last year of the author's life (1817–1903). It is the only time thus far that the Nobel Prize for Literature has been presented to a historian per se. Yet the literary Nobel has since been awarded to a philosopher (1950) with mention of an "intellectual history", and to a war-time leader (1953) for speeches and writings, including a "current events history", plus a Nobel Memorial Prize has been awarded for two "economic histories" (1993). Nonetheless Mommsen's multi-volume History of Rome remains in a singular Nobel class.

The 1911 Encyclopædia Britannica, a well-regarded reference yet nonetheless "a source unsparingly critical", summarizes: "Equally great as antiquary, jurist, political and social historian, Mommsen lived to see the time when among students of Roman history he had pupils, followers, critics, but no rivals. He combined the power of minute investigation with a singular faculty for bold generalization and the capacity for tracing out the effects of thought on political and social life."

The British historian G. P. Gooch, writing in 1913, eleven years after Mommsen's Nobel prize, gives us this evaluation of his Römisches Geschichte: "Its sureness of touch, its many-sided knowledge, its throbbing vitality and the Venetian colouring of its portraits left an ineffaceable impression on every reader." "It was a work of genius and passion, the creation of a young man, and is as fresh and vital to-day as when it was written." About the History of Rome another British historian Arnold J. Toynbee in 1934 wrote, at the beginning of his own 12-volume universal history, "Mommsen wrote a great book, [Römisches Geschichte], which certainly will always be reckoned among the masterpieces of Western historical literature."

== Deliberations ==
=== Nominations ===
Mommsen had not been nominated for the prize in 1901, making it the first rare occasion when an author have been awarded the Nobel Prize in Literature the same year they were first nominated. In total, the Swedish Academy received 44 nominations for 34 writers, including the Russian novelist Leo Tolstoy (four nominations), British philosopher Herbert Spencer (one nomination), and Norwegian playwright Henrik Ibsen (one nomination).

The authors Philip James Bailey, Samuel Butler, Ethna Carbery, Mary Hartwell Catherwood, Francisco Javier de Burgos, Alice Marie Durand (known as Henry Gréville), Ernst Dümmler, Samuel Rawson Gardiner, Bret Harte, Annie French Hector, George Alfred Henty, Grace Hinsdale, Lionel Johnson, Heinrich Landesmann, William McGonagall, Ljubomir Nedić, Frank R. Stockton, Frank Norris, Masaoka Shiki, Gleb Uspensky, Jacint Verdaguer, Swami Vivekananda, and Mathilde Wesendonck died in 1902 without having been nominated for the prize.

Official list of nominees and their nominators for the prize
| No. | Nominee | Country | Genre(s) | Nominator(s) |
|---|---|---|---|---|
| 1 | Juhani Aho (Note: Aho: Enris ("Juniper Twigs", 1899–1900)) (1861–1921) | Russia (Finland) | novel, short story | Johannes Paulson (1855–1918); Gustaf Cederschiöld (1849–1928) |
| 2 | Marcel Barrière (Note: Barrière: Le nouveau Don Juan ("The New Don Juan", 1900)) (1860–1954) | France | novel, essays | Émile Faguet (1847–1916) |
| 3 | Alexander Baumgartner (Note: Baumgartner: Geschichte der Weltliteratur ("The History of World Literature", 1897—1901)) (1841–1910) | Switzerland | poetry, history | Knud Karl Krogh-Tonning (1842–1911) |
| 4 | Bjørnstjerne Bjørnson (Note: Bjørnson: Paul Lange og Tora Parsberg, 1898) (1832–1910) | Norway | poetry, novel, drama, short story | Christen Collin (1857–1926); Karl Johan Warburg (1852–1918) |
| 5 | Bernard Bosanquet (1848–1923) | Great Britain | philosophy | William Macneile Dixon (1866–1946) |
| 6 | Giosuè Carducci (1835–1907) | Italy | poetry, literary criticism, biography, essays | Vittorio Puntoni (1859–1926); Antonio Fogazzaro (1842–1911) |
| 7 | Houston Stewart Chamberlain (Note: Chamberlain: Richard Wagner (1895), Die Grundlagen des neunzehnten Jahrhunderts ("The Foundations of the Nineteenth Century", 1899), Die Worte Christi ("The Word of Christ", 1901), and Immanuel Kant. Die Persönlichkeit als Einführung in das Werk ("Immanuel Kant: The Personality as an Introduction to the Work", 1905)) (1855–1927) | Great Britain; Germany | philosophy | Wolfgang Golther (1863–1945) |
| 8 | José Echegaray Eizaguirre (Note: Echegaray: for his 62 dramatical works.) (1832–1916) | Spain | drama | 12 members of the Royal Spanish Academy |
| 9 | Gustav Falke (Note: Falke: Mynheer der Tod ("My Lord, the Death", 1891), Tanz und Andacht ("Dance and Prayer", 1894), Zwischen zwei Nächten ("Between Two Nights", 1894), Neue Fahrt ("New Journey", 1897), and Mit dem Leben ("With Life", 1899)) (1853–1916) | Germany | novel, poetry | August Sauer (1855–1926) |
| 10 | Antonio Fogazzaro (1842–1911) | Italy | novel, poetry, short story | Per Geijer (1886–1976) |
| 11 | Arne Garborg (Note: Garborg: I Helheim ("In Helheim", 1901)) (1851–1921) | Norway | novel, poetry, drama, essays | Kristian Birch-Reichenwald Aars (1868–1917) |
| 12 | Hartmann Grisar (Note: Grisar: Storia di Roma ("Roman History", 1899), Analecta Romana. I ("Roman Analecta I", 1899), and Geschichte Roms und der Päpste im Mittelalter. I ("History of Rome and the Popes in the Middle Ages", 1901)) (1845–1932) | Germany | history, theology | Knud Karl Krogh-Tonning (1842–1911) |
| 13 | Gerhart Hauptmann (Note: Hauptmann: Die Weber ("The Weavers", 1892), Hanneles Himmelfahrt ("The Assumption of Hannele", 1893), Florian Geyer (1896), and Einsame Menschen ("Lonely lives", 1891)) (1862–1946) | Germany | drama, novel | Max Freiherr von Waldberg (1858–1938); Frederick Pollock (1845–1937); Richard Moritz Meyer (1860–1914) |
| 14 | Henrik Ibsen (1828–1906) | Norway | drama | Axel Erdmann (1873–1954) |
| 15 | Ferenc Kemény (1860–1944) | Austria–Hungary (Hungary) | essays | Gusztáv Heinrich (1845–1922) |
| 16 | Anatoly Koni (Note: Koni: Doktor Friedrich Haass. Lebensskizze eines deutschen Philantropen in Russland ("Friedrich Joseph Haass: Biography of a German Philanthropist in Russia", 1899)) (1844–1927) | Russia | poetry, literary criticism, memoir, law | Anton Woulfert (1877–1927) |
| 17 | Ventura López Fernández (Note: Fernández López: La Rota (Canto épico) ("Broken: Epic Song", 1901)) (1866–1944) | Spain | poetry, drama, literary criticism | Emmanuel Casado Salas (–) |
| 18 | George Meredith (1828–1909) | Great Britain | novel, poetry | Walter Raleigh (1861–1922); Mary Augusta Ward (1851–1920); Oliver Elton (1861–1945) |
| 19 | Frédéric Mistral (Note: Mistral: Mirèio and La Respelido (1900).) (1830–1914) | France | poetry, philology | Eduard Koschwitz (1851–1904); Fredrik Wulff (1845–1930) |
| 20 | Theodor Mommsen (1817–1903) | Germany | history, law | 18 members of the Prussian Academy of Sciences |
| 21 | John Morley (Note: Morley: The Life of William Ewart Gladstone (1903)) (1838–1923) | Great Britain | biography, literary criticism, essays | Alice Stopford Green (1847–1929) |
| 22 | Lewis Morris (Note: Morris: The Epic of Hades (1877), The Works (1901), and Harvest Tide: A Book of Verse (1901)) (1833–1907) | Great Britain | poetry, songwriting, essays | John Rhys (1840–1915); Herbert Warren (1853–1930); Thomas Fowler (1832–1904); Thomas Erskine Holland (1836–1926) |
| 23 | Gaspar Núñez de Arce (1832–1903) | Spain | poetry, drama, law | Mariano Catalina Cobo (1842–1913); Juan Valera y Alcalá-Galiano (1824–1905) |
| 24 | Gaston Paris (Note: Paris: La poésie du moyen âge ("The Poetry of the Middle Ages", 1885–95) Discours de réception ("Reception Speech", 1897), Penseurs et poètes ("Thinkers and Poets", 1896), Poèmes et légendes du moyen âge ("Poems and Legends of the Middle Ages", 1900), and François Villon (1901)) (1839–1903) | France | history, poetry, essays | Fredrik Wulff (1845–1930) |
| 25 | Archibald Robertson (Note: Robertson: Regnum Dei: Eight Lectures on the Kingdom of God in the History of Christian Thought (1901)) (1853–1931) | Great Britain | theology, history | John Wesley Hales (1836–1914) |
| 26 | Paul Sabatier (Note: P. Sabatier: Vie de S. François d'Assise ("The Life of St. Francis of Assisi", 1894)) (1858–1928) | France | history, theology, biography | Carl Bildt (1850–1931) |
| 27 | Henryk Sienkiewicz (Note: Sienkiewicz: Quo Vadis? (1896) and Ogniem i mieczem ("With Fire and Sword", 1884)) (1846–1916) | Russia (Poland) | novel | Hans Hildebrand (1842–1913) |
| 28 | Herbert Spencer (1820–1903) | Great Britain | philosophy, essays | 49 members of The Nobel Prize Committee of the Society of Authors (Note: Nomination was made by 49 separate letters sent in by "The Nobel Prize Committee of the Society of Authors".) |
| 29 | Leo Tolstoy (Note: Tolstoy: Voskreséniye ("Resurrection", 1899)) (1828–1910) | Russia | novel, short story, drama, poetry | Ludovic Halévy (1837–1908); Oscar Levertin (1862–1906); Michel Bréal (1832–1915); Ernest Lichtenberger (1847–1913) |
| 30 | Charles Wagner (Note: Wagner: Justice. Huit discours ("Justice: Eight Speeches", 1889), Sois un homme! Simples causeries sur la conduite de la vie ("Be a Man! Simple Discussions on How to Lead Life", 1889), Jeunesse ("Youth", 1895), Vie Simple ("Simple Life", 1895), L'âme des choses ("The Soul of Things", 1901), and Le long du chemin ("Along the Path", 1901)) (1852–1918) | France | theology, philosophy | Waldemar Rudin (1833–1921) |
| 31 | Carl Weitbrecht (1847–1904) | Germany | history, poetry, short story, essays | Hermann Fischer (1884–1936) |
| 32 | William Butler Yeats (Note: Yeats:The Wanderings of Oisin (1889), The Countess Kathleen and Various Legends and Lyrics (1892), and The Land of Heart's Desire (1894).) | Ireland | poetry, drama, essays | William Edward Lecky (1838–1903) |
| 33 | Theodor Zahn (Note: Zahn: Forschungen zur Geschichte des neutestamentlichen Kanons und der altkirchlichen Litteratur ("Research on the History of the New Testament's Canon and Early Church Literature", 1881–1908), Geschichte des neutestamentlichen Kanons ("History of the New Testament's Canon", 1889–92), and Einleitung in das neue Testament ("Introduction to the New Testament", 1900)) (1838–1933) | German Empire | theology, essays | Lars Dahle (1843–1925) |
| 34 | Émile Zola (Note: Zola: "for his works in general.") (1839–1902) | France | novel, drama, short story | Marcellin Berthelot (1827–1907) |

=== Prize decision ===
In 1902, the Nobel committee considered the authors Leo Tolstoy, Henrik Ibsen and Bjørnstjerne Bjørnson for the prize. Tolstoy was praised for his prominent literary work, but dismissed for his anarchistic ideology; Ibsen was dismissed for similar reasons, his radical style was considered completely against the ideal direction required by Alfred Nobel's will; while Bjørnson was pushed for the next year considering a shared prize with Ibsen. Because the Academy's permanent secretary Carl David af Wirsén was a fierce opponent of the idea of awarding Tolstoy and Ibsen, as a compromise, the historian Theodor Mommsen was launched as an alternative candidate that could be agreed upon.

== Reactions ==
The decision to award the second Nobel Prize in Literature to a non-fiction writer was criticised by some. While praising Mommsen's work in a 1902 article in Ord och Bild, the Swedish professor in Intellectual history Johan Bergman wrote: "It is and remain a flagrant injustice to not award this prize for the best literary work in ideal direction to one of the great idealists among the celebrated authors of our time, to Tolstoj or Björnson or Ibsen." Internationally, Henrik Ibsen and August Strindberg were frequently mentioned as worthy candidates for the prize.
