= 1907 Nobel Prize in Literature =

- Rudyard Kipling
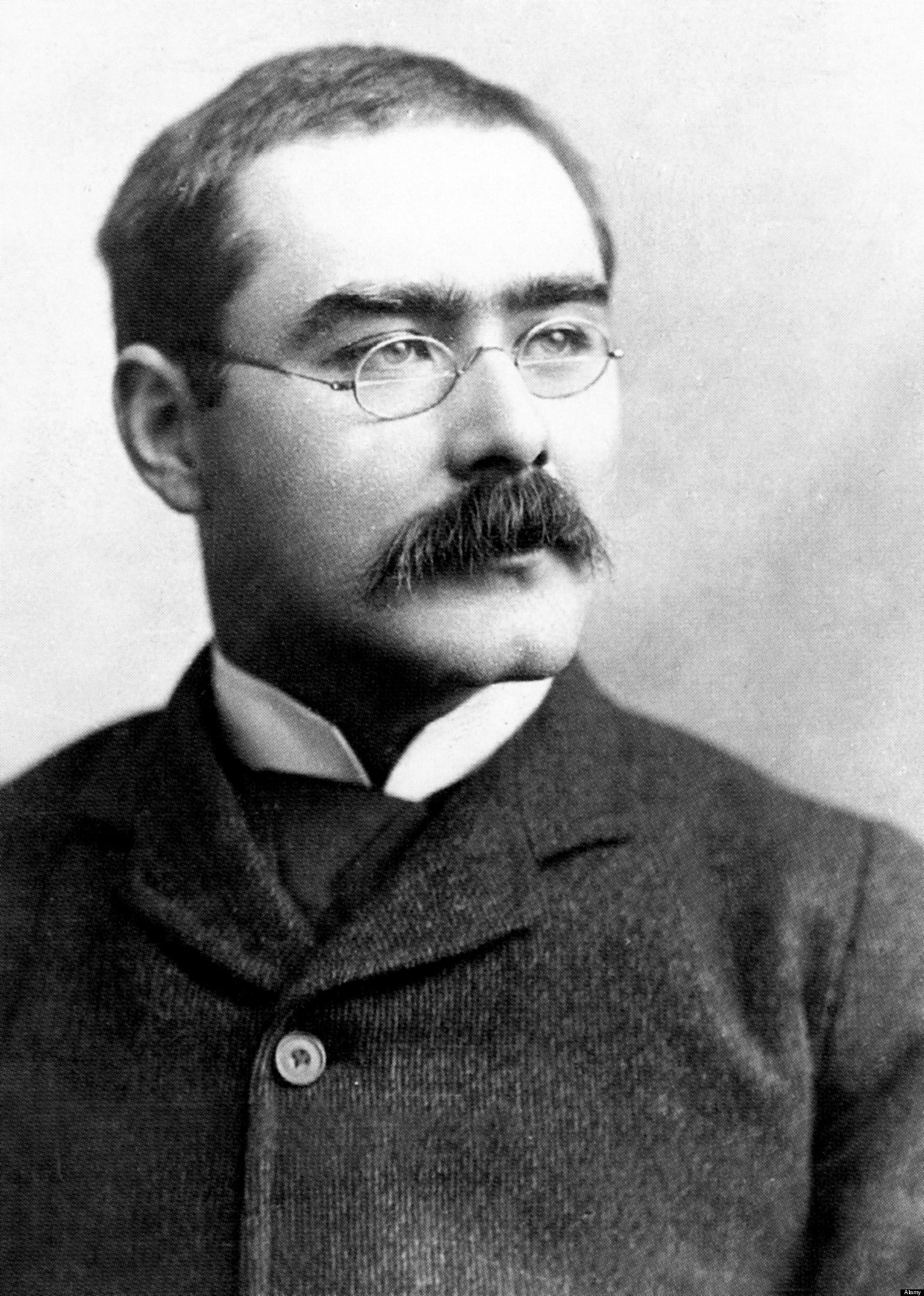
- "in consideration of the power of observation, originality of imagination, virility of ideas and remarkable talent for narration which characterize the creations of this world-famous author."
- Date: 7 November 1907 (announcement); 10 December 1907 (ceremony)
- Location: Stockholm, Sweden
- Presented by: Swedish Academy
- First award: 1901
- Website: Official website

The 1907 Nobel Prize in Literature was awarded to the British writer Rudyard Kipling (1865–1936) "in consideration of the power of observation, originality of imagination, virility of ideas and remarkable talent for narration which characterize the creations of this world-famous author." He is the first English-language writer to receive the prize, and being aged 41, is its youngest recipient to date.

== Laureate ==
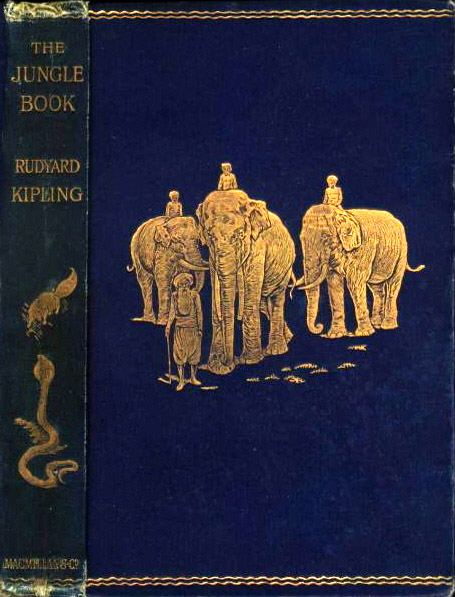
First edition of The Jungle Book by Rudyard Kipling and illustrated by John Lockwood Kipling.

Rudyard Kipling praised the British colonial empire in his works as a poet, short story author, journalist, and novelist, which made his poetry well-liked in the British Army. Children all across the globe have grown to know and love him as a result of The Jungle Book (1894), especially because of Disney's 1967 motion picture adaptation. The Swedish Academy said that Kipling's human portraits and social environment descriptions that "penetrate to the substance of things" rather than merely repeating the fleeting" were his distinctive qualities. His classic literary works include Kim (1901), the Just So Stories (1902) and many short stories, including The Man Who Would Be King (1888).

== Deliberations ==
=== Nominations ===
Kipling was nominated four times beginning in 1904. He was nominated in 1907 by Charles Oman, professor of modern history at the University of Oxford, which later led to him being awarded the Nobel prize.

In total, the Swedish Academy received 37 nominations for 21 writers. The highest number of nominations – five nominations – were for the Italian writer Angelo de Gubernatis followed by American theologian Borden Parker Bowne with four nominations. Eight of the nominees were nominated first-time such as Holger Drachmann, Eduardo Benot, Andrés Manjón, (Note: Padre Manjón is the first nominee for the Nobel Prize in Literature on process for sainthood within the Roman Catholic Church. He was declared Venerable on November 23, 2020 by Pope Francis.) Àngel Guimerà, and Paul Bourget. Selma Lagerlöf is the only female nominee for that year. The American writer Mark Twain was purportedly nominated in 1907 and 1908, but is not included in the archives.

The authors Thomas Bailey Aldrich, Mary Elizabeth Coleridge, Mary De Morgan, Charles Guérin, Louise Granberg, Benedikt Sveinbjarnarson Gröndal, Bogdan Petriceicu Hasdeu, Joris-Karl Huysmans, Alfred Jarry, Mkrtich Khrimian, Hector Malot, David Masson, Bertram Fletcher Robinson, André Theuriet, Marko Vovchok, Lydia Zinovieva-Annibal, Iosif Vulcan, and Stanisław Wyspiański died in 1907 without having been nominated for the prize. The British minister Ian Maclaren and Spanish academic Eduardo Benot died months before the announcement.

Official list of nominees and their nominators for the prize
No.	Nominee	Country	Genre(s)	Nominator(s)
1	Eduardo Benot Rodríguez (1822–1907)	Spain	poetry, drama, essays	Daniel de Cortázar Larrubia (1844–1927)
2	João Bonança (1836–1924)	Portugal	law, essays	Teófilo Braga (1843–1924)
3	Paul Bourget (1852–1935)	France	novel, short story, literary criticism, essays	René Bazin (1853–1932)
4	Borden Parker Bowne (1847–1910)	United States	philosophy, theology, essays	Edwin Holt Hughes (1866–1950); Lemuel Herbert Murlin (1861–1935); William Henry Crawford (1855–1944); Albert Knudson (1873–1953)
5	Georg Brandes (1842–1927)	Denmark	literary criticism, essays	Troels Frederik Lund (1840–1921) (Note: The nomination was made by Troels Frederik Troels-Lund and 17 other members of the Royal Danish Academy of Sciences and Letters); Anatole France (1844–1924)
6	Angelo de Gubernatis (1840–1913)	Italy	drama, essays, philology, poetry	Francesco Lorenzo Pullè (1850–1934); Angelo Valdarnini (1847–1930); Paolo Boselli (1838–1932); Gaspare Finali (1829–1914); Tancredi Canonico (1828–1908)
7	Holger Drachmann (1846–1908)	Netherlands	poetry, drama	Harald Høffding (1843–1931)
8	Antonio Fogazzaro (1842–1911)	Italy	novel, poetry, short story	Eugène-Melchior de Vogüé (1848–1910)
9	Ángel Guimerá Jorge (1845–1924)	Spain	drama, poetry	Joaquim Miret i Sans (1858–1919) (Note: The nomination was made by Joaquin Miret y Sans and 19 other members of Reial Acadèmia de Bones Lletres de Barcelona in Spain)
10	Rudyard Kipling (1865–1936)	Great Britain	short story, novel, poetry	Charles Oman (1860–1946)
11	Selma Lagerlöf (1858–1940)	Sweden	novel, short story	Fredrik Wulff (1845–1930); Adolf Noreen (1854–1925); Gottfrid Billing (1841–1925)
12	Ian Maclaren (1850–1907)	Great Britain	short story, novel, theology, essays	Waldemar Rudin (1833–1921)
13	Andrés Manjón y Manjón (1846–1923)	Spain	pedagogy, theology, essays, law	Ángel Sánchez-Rubio Ibáñez (1852–1910)
14	Marcelino Menéndez Pelayo (1856–1912)	Spain	history, philosophy, philology, poetry, translation, literary criticism	Ángel Sánchez-Rubio Ibáñez (1852–1910)
15	George Meredith (1828–1909)	Great Britain	novel, poetry	Mary Augusta Ward (1851–1920)
16	John Morley (1838–1923)	Great Britain	biography, literary criticism, essays	15 members of the Incorporated Society of Authors
17	Lewis Morris (1833–1907)	Great Britain	poetry, songwriting, essays	William Jackson (Note: The nomination was made jointly by J. Rhys, T.H. Warren and W.W. Jackson, all three at the university in Oxford, Great Britain.) (1838–1931); Herbert Warren (1853–1930); John Rhys (1840–1915)
18	George Lansing Raymond (Note: Lansing Raymond: The Essentials of Aesthetics (1906)) (1839–1929)	United States	essays, philosophy	Charles Needham (1848–1935)
19	Georgios Souris (Note: Souris: Conseiller pour l'instruction publique La Canée, île de Crète ("National Education Advisers in Canée, the Island of Crete")) (1852–1919)	Kingdom of Greece	poetry, songwriting, essays	Nikolaos Levidis (1868–1942) (Note: The nomination was made jointly by Nikolaos Levidis and up to 100 other members of the Greek parliament.); Georgios Hatzidakis (1848–1941); 9 members of the Greek Artists' Association
20	Algernon Charles Swinburne (1837–1909)	Great Britain	poetry, drama, literary criticism, novel	28 members of the Incorporated Society of Authors; Carl Bildt (1850–1931)
21	Jaroslav Vrchlický (1853–1912)	Austria-Hungary (Czechoslovakia)	poetry, drama, translation	Bohuslav Raýman (1852–1910) (Note: The nomination was made jointly by J. Hlávka and B. Rayman.); Josef Hlávka (1831–1908)

=== Prize decision ===
In 1907, the Nobel committee proposed that the Nobel Prize in Literature should be awarded to the English author Rudyard Kipling, noting that "Kipling is a lover of concretion and concentration; one almost never finds in him empty abstractions and never paraphrases. He quickly finds the striking expression, the descriptive epithet. One does not notice a trace of imitation in him. He has been compared to Bret Harte, to Pierre Loti, to Dickens; but he is always original, and his power of invention is, it seems, inexhaustible."

The Nobel committee also made special mentions of the Catalan poet Àngel Guimerà y Jorge, English author Algernon Charles Swinburne, French writer Paul Bourget and Italian writer Antonio Fogazzaro as worthy candidates for the prize. The candidacy of Selma Lagerlöf, (who was eventually awarded the 1909 Nobel Prize in Literature), "whose developed genius in certain works, such as the first part of "Jerusalem", could not, in all members of the committee, erase the impression of a certain artificial manner in "Gösta Berling's Saga" or of the arbitrary mixing of saga and reality, which takes place in the folk book about Nils Holgersson" divided the members of the committee.

Nobel committee member Carl David af Wirsén advocated a prize for Swinburne, but ultimately Wirsén chose to support Kipling's candidacy as a way of blocking Selma Lagerlöf, whose writing Wirsén disliked, from being awarded.

On 7 November 1907 the Swedish Academy decided that the Nobel Prize in Literature should be awarded to Rudyard Kipling "in consideration of the power of observation, originality of imagination, virility of ideas and remarkable talent for narration which characterize the creations of this world-famous author".

== Reactions ==
The choice of Rudyard Kipling was very well received. Kipling was widely celebrated by both the Swedish press and public crowds when he arrived in Stockholm to accept the prize.

== Award Ceremony ==
At the award ceremony in Stockholm on 10 December 1907, the Permanent Secretary of the Swedish Academy, Carl David af Wirsén, praised both Kipling and three centuries of English literature, saying:

"The Swedish Academy, in awarding the Nobel Prize in Literature this year to Rudyard Kipling, desires to pay a tribute of homage to the literature of England, so rich in manifold glories, and to the greatest genius in the realm of narrative that that country has produced in our times."
