= Caronia (disambiguation) =

Caronia is a town in Italy.

Caronia may also refer to:

- RMS Caronia (1904), an ocean liner owned by Cunard Line 1904–1933
- RMS Caronia (1947), a combined ocean liner/cruise ship owned by Cunard Line 1948–1967
- MS Caronia (previously Vistafjord), a cruise ship owned by Cunard Line 1983–2004
- British Rail Class 40 diesel locomotive D219
- Giuseppe Caronia (1884–1977), Italian politician
