= 1904 Nobel Prize in Literature =

- José Echegaray Eizaguirre and Frédéric Mistral
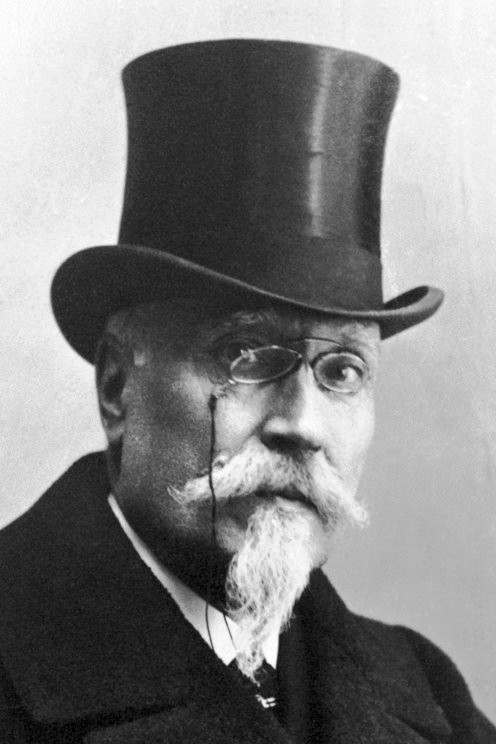
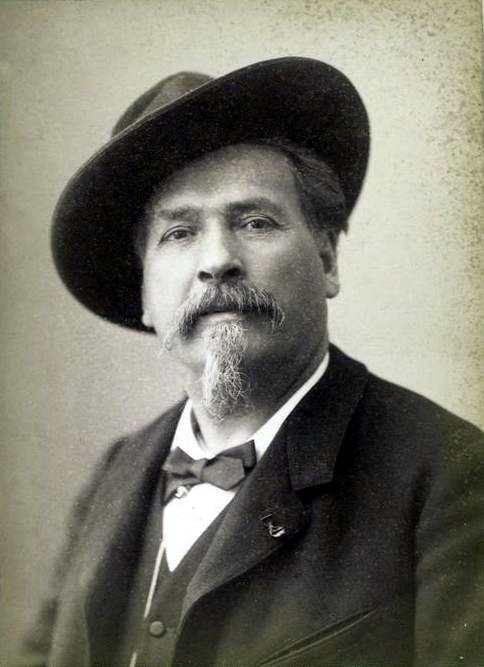
- Echegaray "in recognition of the numerous and brilliant compositions which, in an individual and original manner, have revived the great traditions of the Spanish drama," and Mistral "in recognition of the fresh originality and true inspiration of his poetic production, which faithfully reflects the natural scenery and native spirit of his people, and, in addition, his significant work as a Provençal philologist."
- Date: 17 November 1904 (announcement); 10 December 1904 (ceremony)
- Location: Stockholm, Sweden
- Presented by: Swedish Academy
- First award: 1901
- Website: Official website

The 1904 Nobel Prize in Literature was the fourth literary prize resulting from Alfred Nobel's will. It was equally divided between the French Provençal philologist Frédéric Mistral (1830–1914) "in recognition of the fresh originality and true inspiration of his poetic production, which faithfully reflects the natural scenery and native spirit of his people, and, in addition, his significant work as a Provençal philologist" and the Spanish engineer and dramatist José Echegaray Eizaguirre (1832–1916) "in recognition of the numerous and brilliant compositions which, in an individual and original manner, have revived the great traditions of the Spanish drama."

It was the first of the four occasions (Note: The other years with a shared prize were 1917, 1966 and 1974.) when the Nobel Prize in Literature has been shared between two individuals.

== Laureates ==
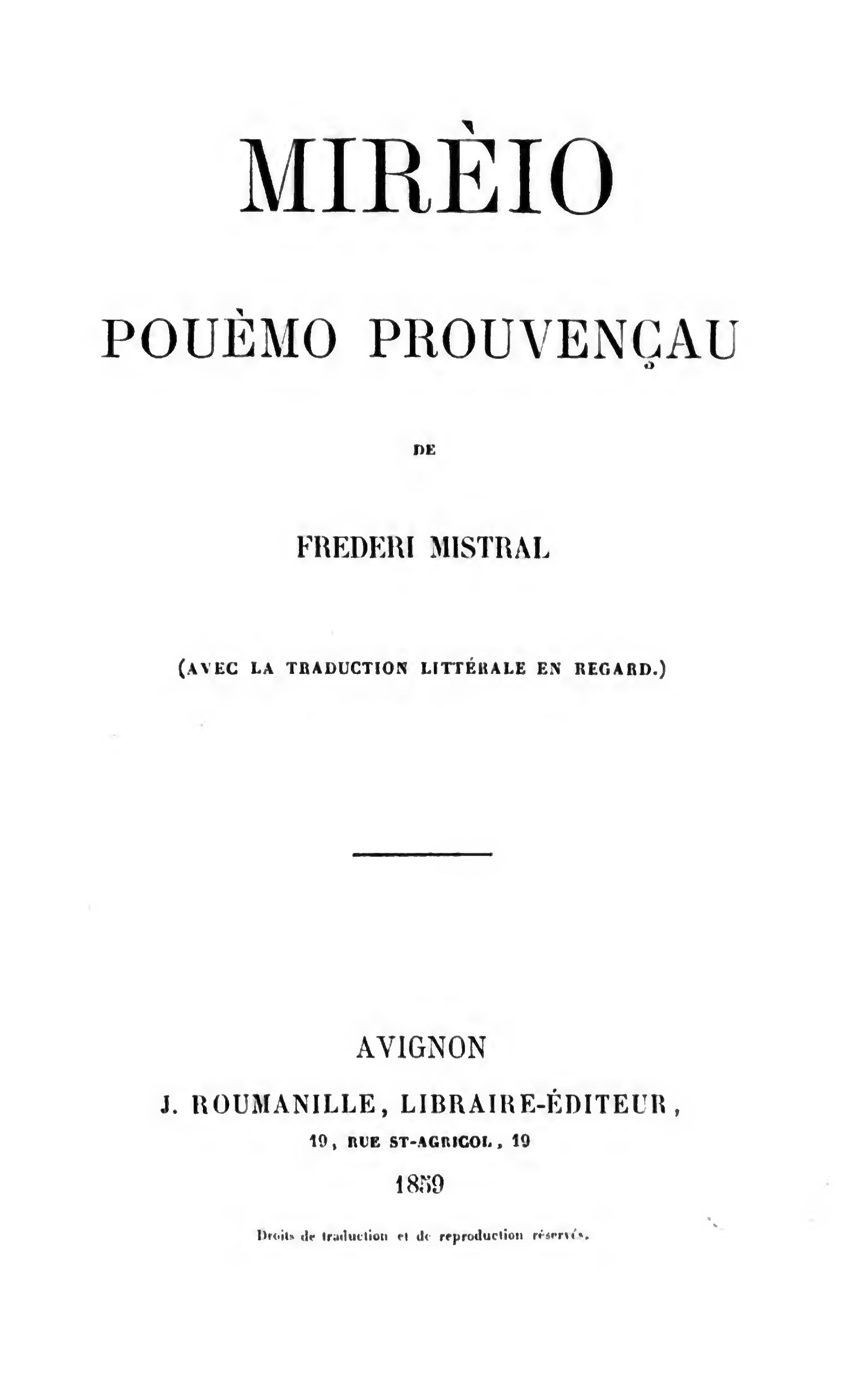
Mirèio published in 1859 by Frédéric Mistral.

=== Frédéric Mistral ===
Mistral’s passion for poetry was sparked by one of his teachers, the Provençal poet Joseph Roumanille. He spent many years compiling Trésor dóu Félibrige, a dictionary of the Provençal language published by the Felibrige literary society, which he founded himself. His most important work, Mirèio, was published in 1859, the result of eight years of work. He also authored Lou Tresor dóu Félibrige (1878–1886), which to date remains the most comprehensive dictionary of the Occitan language, and one of the most reliable, thanks to the precision of its definitions. It is a bilingual dictionary, Occitan-French, in two large volumes, with all of the dialects of oc, including Provençal. Mistral owes to François Vidal the work of typesetting and revising that dictionary.

=== José Echegaray Eizaguirre ===
Echegaray’s literary debut took place relatively late, in 1874 when he was 42 years old. He subsequently had a productive career, publishing an average of two plays a year for the rest of his life. A mathematician, engineer and administrator, he built his plays with the same regard for exactitude and duty that inspired his public life. Conflicts involving duty are at the heart of most of his plays, and he upheld the idea with uncompromising severity. His exalted romanticism is apparent in his choice of subjects. His most famous plays include El gran Galeoto (adapted into a silent film entitled "The World and His Wife"), La esposa del vengador ("The Avenger's Wife", 1874), and Conflicto entre dos deberes ("Conflict of Two Duties", 1882). He also extensively wrote 25 to 30 mathematical physics volumes.

== Deliberations ==
=== Nominations ===
For the 1904 prize, the Swedish Academy received 29 nominations for 21 writers. Among the nominees were Albert Sorel, Anatole France (awarded later in 1921), Leo Tolstoy, Henrik Ibsen, Algernon Charles Swinburne, Rudyard Kipling (awarded in 1907), and Henryk Sienkiewicz (awarded later in 1905). Two of the nominees were women, Swedish novelist Selma Lagerlöf (awarded later in 1909) and French actress Émilie Lerou.

The authors Edwin Arnold, Anton Chekhov, Kate Chopin, Karl Emil Franzos, Lafcadio Hearn, Theodor Herzl, Wilhelm Jordan, Mór Jókai, Antonio Labriola, Dumitru Theodor Neculuță, Auguste Molinier, Larin Paraske, Ștefan Petică, Abai Qunanbaiuly, Samuel Smiles, Leslie Stephen, Hans von Hopfen, and Jose Clemente Zulueta died in 1904 without having been nominated for the prize.

Official list of nominees and their nominators for the prize
No.	Nominee	Country	Genre(s)	Nominator(s)
1	Demetrios Bernardakis (1833–1907)	Greece	drama, history, essays	Athanasios Vernardakis (1848–1925) (Note: Athanasios Bernardakis [Vernardakis] is the brother of Demetrios Bernardakis.)
2	Georg Brandes (1842–1927)	Denmark	literary criticism, essays	Troels Frederik Lund (1840–1921)
3	William Chapman (Note: Chapman: Les aspirations : poésies canadiennes ("Aspirations: Canadian Poems", 1904)) (1850–1917)	Canada	poetry, translation	François Lhomme (1846–1929)
4	Robert Langton Douglas (Note: Douglas: Life and Works of Fra Angelico (1902) and History of the Republic of Siena (1902)) (1864–1951)	Great Britain	history, essays	William Mitchell (1861–1962); Samuel Way (1836–1916)
5	José Echegaray Eizaguirre (1832–1916)	Spain	drama	Daniel de Cortázar Larrubia (1844–1927) (Note: According to the minutes of a meeting of the Nobel Committee, the nomination arrived late due to slow mail service and it was decided to include it in the nominations for 1904 and not moved for 1905.)
6	Anatole France (1844–1924)	France	poetry, essays, drama, novel, literary criticism	Marcellin Berthelot (1827–1907)
7	Henrik Ibsen (1828–1906)	Norway	drama	Jakob Minor (1855–1912)
8	Rudyard Kipling (1865–1936)	Great Britain	short story, novel, poetry	Edwin Arnold (1832–1904) (Note: According to the minutes of a meeting of the Nobel Committee, the nomination letter had been temporarily misplaced, and it was decided to include it in the nominations for 1904 and not moved for 1905.)
9	Selma Lagerlöf (1858–1940)	Sweden	novel, short story	Harald Hjärne (1848–1922)
10	Émilie Lerou (Note: Lerou: Hiésous ("Jesus", 1903)) (1855–1935)	France	novel, memoirs, drama	Jules Claretie (1840–1913)
11	Maurice Maeterlinck (1862–1949)	Belgium	drama, poetry, essays	Paul Thomas (1852–1937) (Note: The nomination was made by Paul Thomas and 14 other professors at the Faculty of philosophy at the University of Ghent, Belgium.)
12	George Meredith (1828–1909)	Great Britain	novel, poetry	3 members of the Incorporated Society of Authors
13	Frédéric Mistral (1830–1914)	France	poetry, philology	Per Geijer (1886–1976); Carl Wahlund (1846–1913)
14	John Morley (Note: Morley: The Life of William Ewart Gladstone (1903)) (1838–1923)	Great Britain	biography, literary criticism, essays	John Lubbock, 1st Baron Avebury (1858–1929); John Mounteney Lely (1839–1907)
15	Lewis Morris (Note: Morris: The Epic of Hades (1877), The Works (1901), and Harvest Tide: A Book of Verse (1901)) (1833–1907)	Great Britain	poetry, songwriting, essays	Herbert Warren (1853–1930); John Rhys (1840–1915); Thomas Fowler (1832–1904)
16	Henryk Sienkiewicz (1846–1916)	Russia (Poland)	novel	Harald Hjärne (1848–1922)
17	Albert Sorel (Note: Sorel: L’Europe et la révolution française ("Europe and the French Revolution", 1885–1904)) (1842–1906)	France	history, essays	Gabriel Hanotaux (1853–1944)
18	Algernon Charles Swinburne (1837–1909)	Great Britain	poetry, drama, literary criticism, novel	Arnold Francke (1855–1905); 39 members of the Incorporated Society of Authors
19	Leo Tolstoy (1828–1910)	Russia	novel, short story, drama, poetry	Albert Sorel (1842–1906); Ludovic Halévy (1837–1908)
20	Jaroslav Vrchlický (1853–1912)	Austria–Hungary (Czechoslovakia)	poetry, drama, translation	Arnošt Kraus (1859–1943) (Note: The nomination was made by Arnosy Kraus and 23 other professors at the Czech University in Prague, Czechoslovakia.); Georg Christian, Prince of Lobkowicz (1835–1908)
21	Theodor Zahn (Note: Zahn: Forschungen zur Geschichte des neutestamentlichen Kanons und der altkirchlichen Litteratur ("Research on the History of the New Testament's Canon and Early Church Literature", 1881–1908), Geschichte des neutestamentlichen Kanons ("History of the New Testament's Canon", 1889–92), and Einleitung in das neue Testament ("Introduction to the New Testament", 1900)) (1838–1933)	Germany	theology, essays	Lars Dahle (1843–1925)

=== Prize decision ===
In their report to the Swedish Academy dated 12 september 1904, the Nobel committee proposed that that year's Nobel Prize in Literature should be awarded to the French Provençal poet and philologist Frédéric Mistral: "His poetry has spread its Provençal sunlight to many regions, yes, even to the land of the Hyperboreans, where many a heart has been warmed by his songs. May the great Nobel Prize now be awarded to him as recognition and tribute! The ideality that the testator demands of the author who is to be considered worthy of this prize is found in abundance in the poet, whose poetry, which has never valued anything low, is distinguished by a both healthy and flourishing rich, artistic ideality, in the man who has truly devoted his entire life to one thing, to the uplift and refinement of the spiritual interests, language and literature of his native land."

For the 1904 prize, Polish novelist Henryk Sienkiewicz (subsequently awarded the 1905 Nobel Prize in Literature) and Spanish playwright José Echegaray were also considered. Acclaimed French author Anatole France (subsequently awarded the 1921 Nobel Prize in Literature) was rejected by the Nobel committee: "If one considers Anatole France's work as a whole, one must certainly admire his technique and his biting wit; but one feels, in any case, that there is something desolate, even disconsolate, in his elusive, icy mockery, and one is unable to discover anything positive in his conception of our human life, which seems to him rather like a pitiful farce", as were the candidacies of Leo Tolstoy, Henrik Ibsen and Selma Lagerlöf (subsequently awarded in 1909).

During the final deliberations, committee chairman Carl David af Wirsén became worried about the poor quality of recent translations of Mistral's works by committee member Rupert Nyblom, especially on his masterpiece Mirèio. Wirsén was worried about the reputation of the committee and proposed withdrawing Mistral's candidacy and opting for Echegaray instead. After failing to get major approval and only find fifty per cent support for this proposal, the Swedish Academy decided to share the prize, as a compromise choice, between the two men.

On 17 November 1904 the Swedish Academy decided that that year's Nobel Prize in Literature should be shared between Frédéric Mistral "in recognition of the fresh originality and true inspiration of his poetic production, which faithfully reflects the natural scenery and native spirit of his people, and, in addition, his significant work as a Provençal philologist" and José Echegaray "in recognition of the numerous and brilliant compositions which, in an individual and original manner, have revived the great traditions of the Spanish drama."

== Reactions ==
There was an uproar in the press in Spain and Italy, as Spain thought Benito Pérez Galdós – one of Europe's greatest living novelists at the time – would get the prize, same as Italians felt when they found that their national poet Giosuè Carducci was not recognized.

== Award Ceremony ==
At the award ceremony in December 10, 1904, af Wirsén said:

"The Academy has thought particularly of two authors who would both have been worthy of the whole Nobel Prize. Both have attained the final limits not only of the poetic art, but even of human life; one is seventy-four years old, the other two years younger. Therefore the Academy believes it should not wait longer to confer on them a distinction they both equally merit, although from different points of view, and it has awarded half the annual Prize to each. If the material value of the award is thus diminished for each of the laureates, the Academy nonetheless wishes to state publicly that, in this particular case, it considers each of these two Prizes as the equivalent of the whole Prize."

Echegaray was not able to partake in nobel banquet and the awarding ceremony in Stockholm due to health conditions.
