= Gallus Jacob Baumgartner =

Swiss statesman

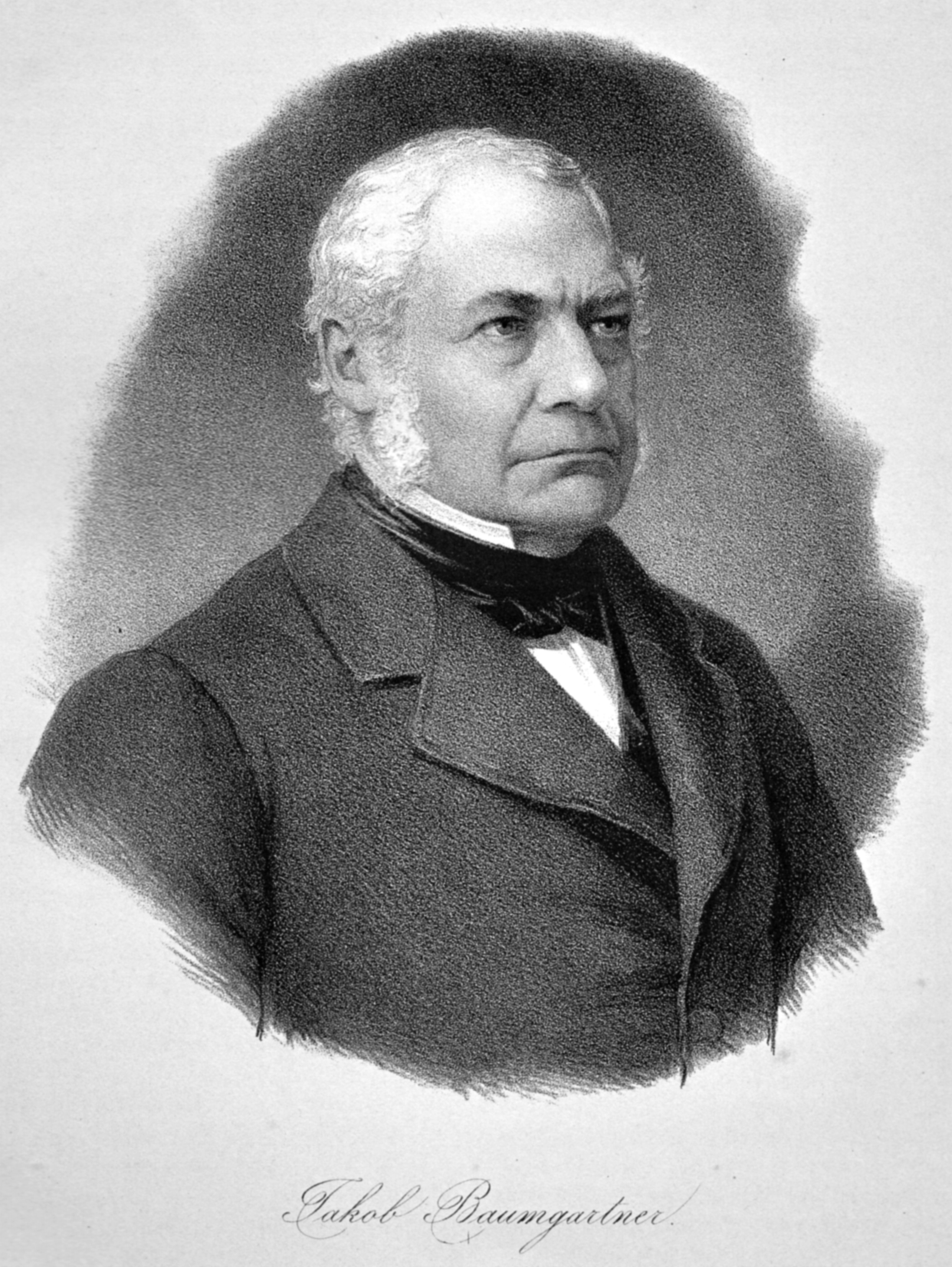
- Born: 18 October 1797; Altstätten, Canton of St. Gallen
- Died: 12 July 1869 (aged 71)
- Occupation: Statesman

Gallus Jacob Baumgartner (18 October 1797 in Altstätten, Switzerland – 12 July 1869 at St. Gall) was a Swiss statesman and prominent federalist.

== Biography ==
After attending the Gymnasium in St. Gall he studied law at Fribourg, Switzerland, and in Vienna. From 1817 to 1819 he was a tutor in Hungary. Returning to Vienna in 1819, he was arrested there after the murder of August von Kotzebue by Karl Ludwig Sand on the false suspicion of belonging to a Swiss political society and was expelled form the city in 1820. He began his political career as keeper of the archives of his native canton, St. Gall. This position gave him the opportunity of learning the topography, history, laws, and legal relations of the canton. In 1822 he was made official secretary; in 1825 he became a member of the great council of the canton and was appointed chancellor.

On account of his knowledge of business he was selected, in 1831, for the position of Landammann, or chief magistrate of the canton, and held the office until 1846. During his administration he tried to make a closely united republic out of the loosely connected cantons, and to improving the Swiss roads and waterways. Appointed a delegate, at this time, to the diet at Lucerne he endeavoured at the diet to bring about a reorganization of the confederation. He wished to create a vigorous, organically united republic similar to that of the United States, retaining at the same time a large amount of independence for the individual cantons. Baumgartner's chief opponents in carrying out this project were the Catholic clergy, for he aimed to separate the Catholic church entirely from Rome and to place it under the control of the State. He was largely influenced by Josephinism and by the ideas of Ignaz Heinrich von Wessenberg.

In 1832, at his suggestion, the Bishopric of Chur was dissolved. In 1834, at the so-called Assembly of Baden, he gave expression to his views in the motions he introduced. These were, that ecclesiastical administration of law be placed under the control of the State, that he should have direction of the education of the clergy, that the ecclesiastical right of patronage should be limited and that the privileges of the religious orders should be revoked. After 1841, when his political friends dissolved the monastic houses of Aargau by force, he changed his opinions and came over to the side of his former opponents. On this account he had to retire from his position as Landammann. In 1845 he again entered the diet as representative of the Catholic Peoples' party, but after two years was forced out by the victory of the Liberals. He now propounded the views of the Catholic Church in the press and in popular assemblies. He was once more a member of the Swiss federal assembly, 1857–60, and became again Landammann but was overthrown in 1864.

After his defeat in 1864, Baumgartner withdrew altogether from public life and devoted himself to the study of the history of his native canton. The results of his researches appeared in two works issued by him: Die Schweiz in ihren Kämpfen und Umgestaltungen von 1830-1850 (4 vols, Zurich, 1853, 1866), and Geschichte des schweizerischen Freistaats und Kantons St. Gallen (2 vols., Zurich, 1868). A third volume of the history was prepared by his son, Alexander, from the papers Baumgartner left at his death, and issued in Einsiedeln in 1890. His son, Alexander Baumgartner, a poet and historian of literature, published an extensive biography of him under the title: Gallus Jakob Baumgartner und die neuere Staatssentwicklung der Schweiz (Freiburg, Baden, 1892).
