= Józef Kallenbach =

Polish historian (1861–1929)

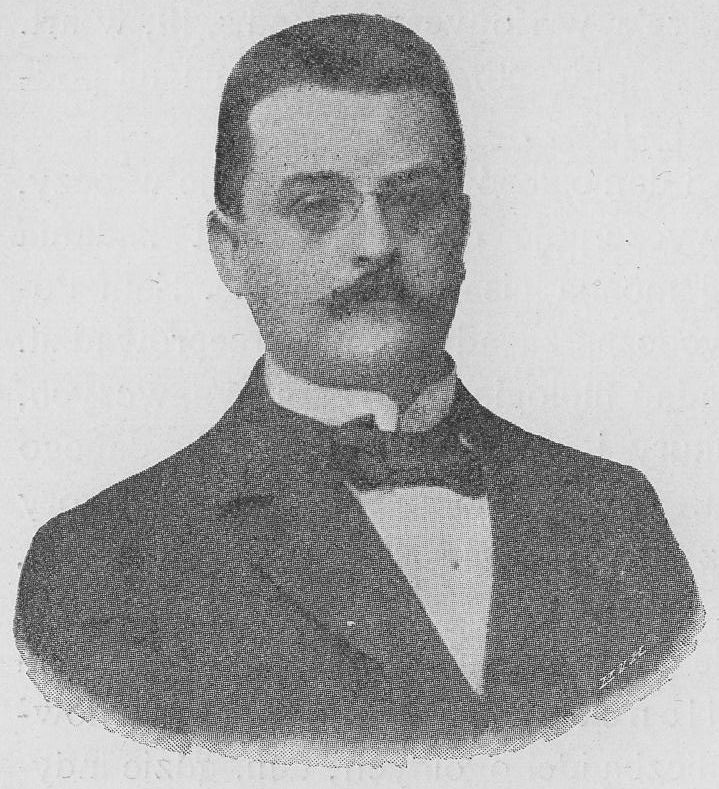
Józef Kallenbach

Józef Henryk Kallenbach (24 November 1861 – 12 September 1929) was a Polish historian of literature.

== Biography ==
Kallenbach was born on 24 November 1861 in Kamenets-Podolsky, Podolia Governorate, Russian Empire (now Kamianets-Podilskyi, Ukraine). He was the son of Henryk Kallenbach, a publisher originally from Rheinfelden, Switzerland. Kallenbach graduated from the IV Public Male Gymnasium Jan Długosz of old-classical type in Lwów. He then studied philology in Kraków, Leipzig and Paris, graduating from Kraków's Jagiellonian University in 1884.

After researches in Basel, Rome, Paris and London, Kallenbach was appointed the first full professor of Polish and Slavic languages and literatures at the University of Fribourg in 1889; he was the university's dean from 1894 to 1895. In 1904, Kallenbach moved to Warsaw, where he became director of the library of the Krasiński family estate. He was appointed professor of Polish literary history at the University of Lwów in 1904, at the University of Warsaw in 1915, and finally at the Jagiellonian University in 1920. Kallenbach was also a member of the Akademia Umiejętności, and a director of the Czartoryski Museum and Library in Kraków.

Kallenbach lectured about Polish pre-partitions literature and romanticism. During his time in Lwów he examined the works of the Three Bards of Polish literature: Adam Mickiewicz, Zygmunt Krasiński and Juliusz Słowacki. Some of his most notable works refer to the literature of Old Poland. Kallenbach's French-language works include Les humanistes polonais (1891) and Sigismond Krasiński et Henry Reeve d'après leur correspondance (1902). Kallenbach died in Kraków on 12 September 1929, aged 68. He was buried in Lychakivskiy Cemetery, as he considered himself connected to Lwów.

== Bibliography ==
- Zięba-Dąbrowska, Agnieszka (2024). "Profesor Józef Kallenbach (1861–1929) jako badacz twórczości wieszczów romantyzmu". Romantyczność i filologia. Wileńskie kręgi Adama Mickiewicza. Studia. Przełomy/Pogranicza: Studia Literackie (in Polish). Vol. 49. Białystok–Vilnius: Wydawnictwo Prymat. pp. 301–313. ISBN 978-83-7657-509-4.
