= Antoni Kalina =

Polish activist, ethnographer, ethnologist, and rector

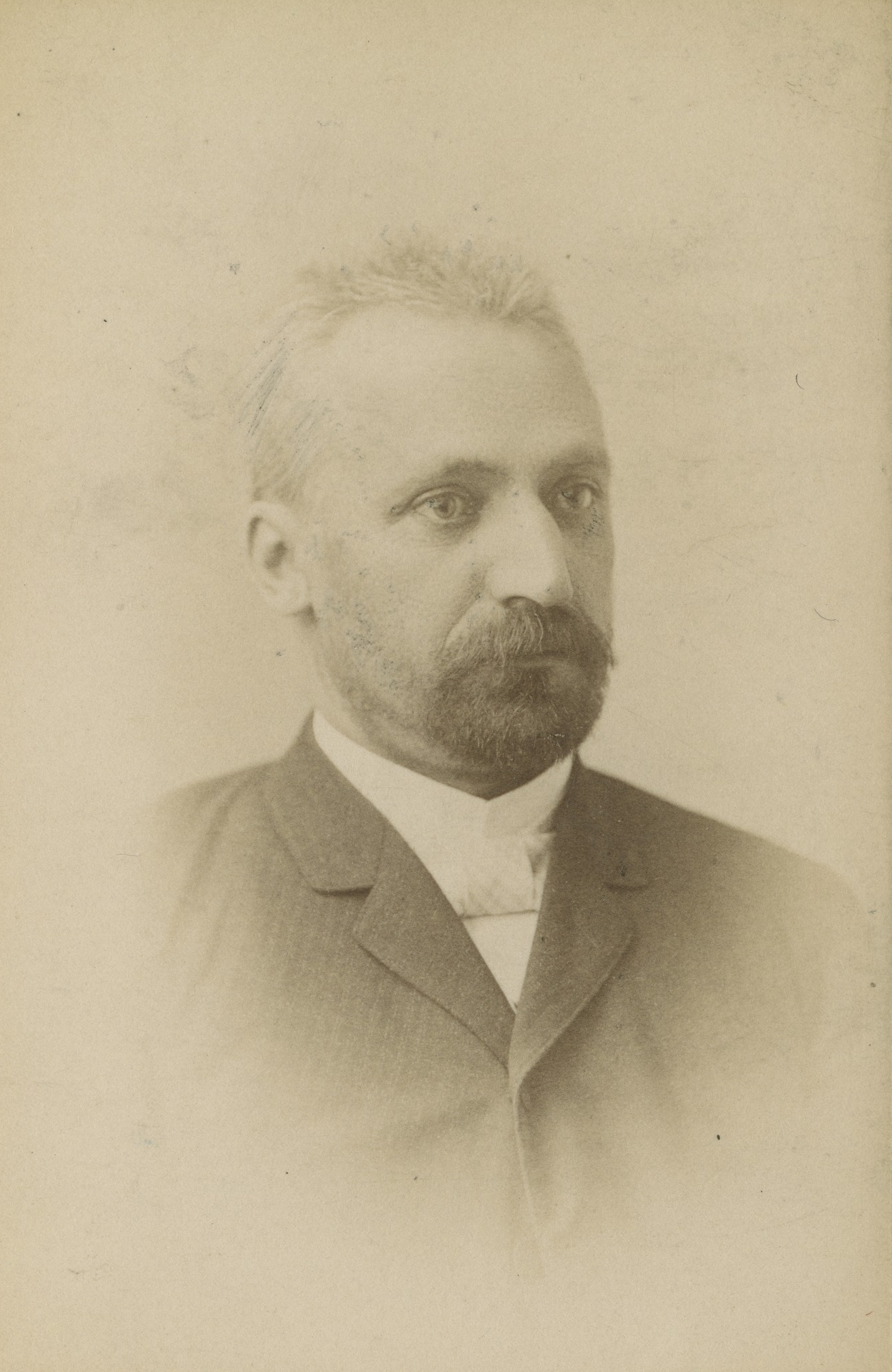
Antoni Kalina in 1889

Antoni Kalina (1846–1906) was a Polish activist, ethnographer and ethnologist, and rector of Lviv University.
