= Carl Friedrich Glasenapp =

Baltic German philologist and writer (1847–1915)

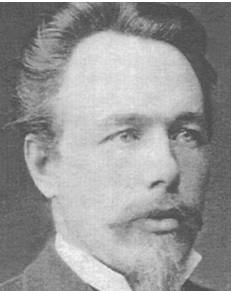
Carl Friedrich Glasenapp

Carl Friedrich Glasenapp (3 October 1847–14 April 1915) was a Baltic German writer, author of the first biography of composer Richard Wagner.

== Biography ==
Carl Friedrich Glasenapp was born in Riga, the present-day capital of Latvia but at the time part of the Russian Empire. He came from a German-speaking family. After finishing school in Riga, he moved to Tartu (known as Dorpat in German, in present-day Estonia) where he studied linguistics, art history and philology at the University of Tartu. In 1873 he took up a position as a school teacher in Pärnu, and in 1875 moved back to Riga where he kept working as a high-school teacher. In Riga he founded and presided over the local Richard Wagner society. He received the rank of State Councillor. He died on 14 April 1915 in Riga.

== Works on Wagner ==
Glasenapp had encountered the music of Wagner at an early age and became an enthusiastic supporter of the composer. The idea to write a biography about Wagner appears to have came to him while still a student. His biography with the tile "Richard Wagner's Leben" was the first one about Wagner, and published in three volumes 1876–1882. He travelled to Bayreuth with the manuscript of the first volume to present it to Wagner; he became a loyal and trusted biography whose depiction of Wagner's life was coloured by his admiration for the composer. However, being a member of the circle close to Wagner also gave him access to important information. He also co-authored, together with Heinrich Freiherr von Stein, a "Wagner-Lexikon" (1883), a further "Wagner-Encyclopädie" in two volumes (1891), and a revised and expanded biography of Wagner, "Das Leben Richard Wagners", in six volumes (1876-1911). He was nominated for the Nobel Prize in Literature for the latter work.
