= Henry Gréville =

French writer (1842–1902)

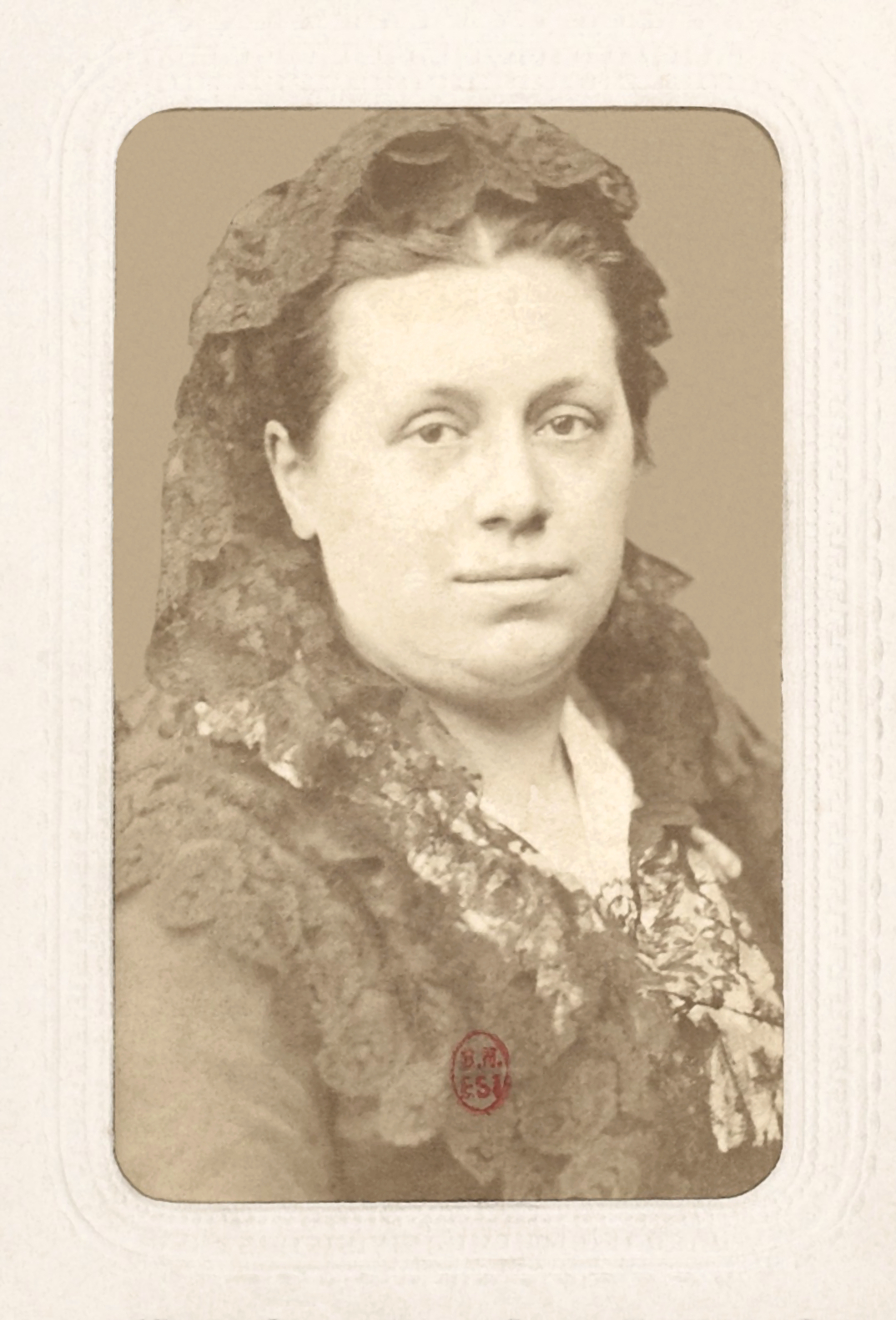
"Henry Gréville" (c.1870)

Alice Marie Céleste Durand (née Fleury; 12 October 1842 in Paris – 26 May 1902) was a French writer best known under her pen name Henry Gréville. She was a Montyon Prize laureate.

== Biography ==
Alice Marie Céleste Fleury was the daughter of a professor.

Without a teacher, she mastered Latin, Greek, mathematics and the modern languages. At the age of thirteen, she translated Télémaque into Italian, Spanish and English. Her childhood and youth were spent in Russia, where her father was employed as a private tutor in St. Petersburg. She also gave lessons in the most aristocratic homes of St. Petersburg marriage.

She married Émile Durand, a French law professor at Petersburg, with whom she returned to France in 1872.

Gréville had already published novels in St. Petersburg journals: A travers des champs and Sonia, and continued her production in France, first with the novels Dosia (1876) and L'Expiation de Savéli (1876), depicting Russian society. Her first full novel Dosia was awarded the Montyon Prize and saw many editions. Her books were translated in many European languages.

The subjects that made Mme. Gréville's reputation were drawn from Russian life. Her sojourn in Russia had left pictures and memories that she was able to evoke and communicate with wonderful precision and vividness. To her great powers of observation, were added imaginative qualities, as may be seen in her Koumiassine, La Princesse Ogheroff, and L'Expiation de Savéli. In all of them, she introduced a character that was then quite novel. Finding it necessary to get new subjects for her work, she found them in the events of every-day life. The material was so abundant that she published not less than 50 volumes. These novels may be characterized as optimistic and idealistic. Despite the fundamental insipidity of these rosewater stories, like Le Roman d'un père, Le Moulin frapier, and others, they found abundance of readers by reason of their clear and flowing style and the art with which the plot was devised to give continuity and at the same time produce surprises.

Gréville died in 1902, at the age of sixty years.

== Works ==
- A travers des champs
- Sonia
- La Fille de Dosia (1876)
- L'Expiation de Savéli (1876)
- La Princesse Oghérof (1876)
- Les Koumiassine (1877)
- Suzanne Normis (1877)
- La Maison de Maurèze (1877)
- Les Épreuves de Raïssa (1877)
- L'Amie (1878)
- Un violon russe (1879)
- Lucie Rodey (1879)
- Le Moulin Frappier (1880)
- La cité Ménard (1880)
- L'Héritage de Xénie (1880); Published in German as Erbschaft Xenias in Engelhorn's allgemeine Roman-Bibliothek series (1888)
- Madame de Dreux (1881)
- Rose Rozier (1872)
- Un crime (1884)
- Clairefontaine. Paris: Plon-Nourrit. 1885. OCLC 902262395.
- Idylle.... (1885)
- Cléopâtre (1886)
- Zitka or the Trials of Raissa no date stamp on the paperback from Royal Publishing Company.
- Aurette (1891)
