= Max Freiherr von Waldberg =

German professor (1858–1938)

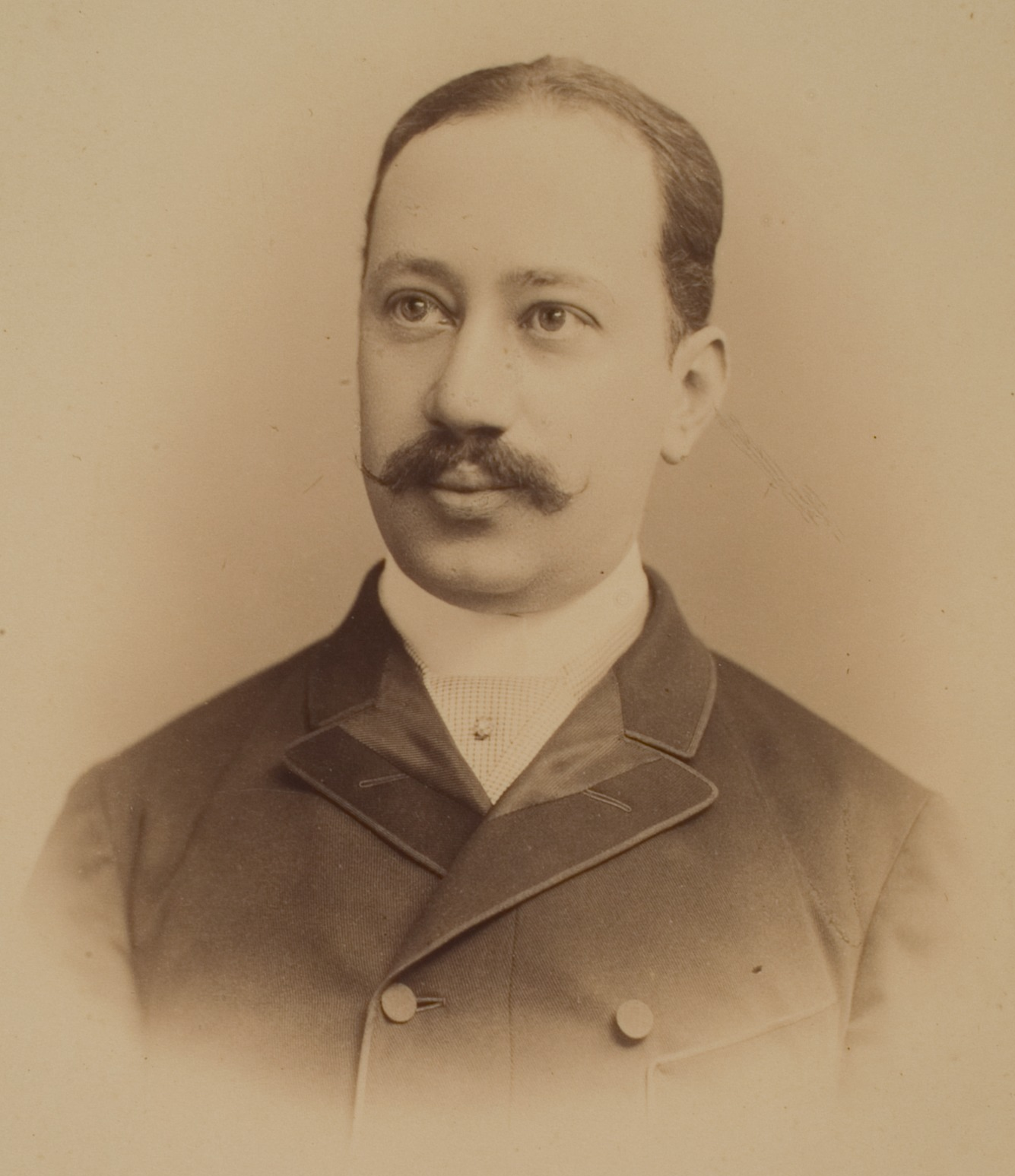
- Born: January 1, 1858; Czernowitz, Austrian Empire
- Died: November 6, 1938 (aged 80); Heidelberg, Nazi Germany

Max Freiherr von Waldberg (January 1, 1858 — November 6, 1938) was a professor of modern literature at the University of Heidelberg in Germany. After World War I, one of his students was Joseph Goebbels, later the Nazi's propaganda minister. Nevertheless, because of his Jewish ancestry, von Waldberg was one of several Heidelberg professors forced to retire in April 1933, when the Third Reich passed a Civil Service Law to remove university faculty members of "non-Aryan" descent.
