= Giuseppe Caronia =

Italian politician (1884–1977)

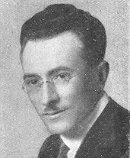
- Giuseppe Caronia
- Born: 15 May 1884; San Cipirello
- Died: 15 January 1977 (aged 92)
- Occupation: Politician

Giuseppe Caronia (15 May 1884 – 15 January 1977) was an Italian politician.

Caronia was born in San Cipirello. He represented the Christian Democracy party in the Constituent Assembly of Italy from 1946 to 1948 and in the Chamber of Deputies from 1948 to 1958. He nominated Pope Pius XII for a Nobel Peace Prize in 1948. In 1996 he was recognized as Righteous Among the Nations by the Yad Vashem.

== Bibliography ==
- Italo Farnetani, Pediatri e medici alla Costituente, Editeam, Cento (FE), 2006. ISBN 88-6135-001-1
- Giulio Andreotti, Caronia visto da vicino da Andreotti , «Grand'Angolo di Edit-Symposia. Pediatria e Neonatologia» 2006; 13 (1), pp. 21-22.
- G. Roberto Burgio, Caronia: lo scienziato-rettore visto da un Maestro , «Grand'Angolo di Edit-Symposia. Pediatria e Neonatologia» 2006; 13 (1), pp. 18-20.
- Italo Farnetani, Il ruolo del pediatra Giuseppe Caronia "giusto fra le nazioni" , «Grand'Angolo di Edit-Symposia. Pediatria e Neonatologia» 2005; 12 (2), p. 39.
- Italo Farnetani, I venticinque pediatri, decorati con la Medaglia d'oro della sanità, hanno scritto la storia della Repubblica, prefazione del ministro della salute Beatrice Lorenzin, «Pediatria Preventiva & Sociale» 2016; 11 (3), pp 10-21- https://www.sipps.it/pdf/rivista/2016_03.pdf
- Antonio Pavan (1988). "Giuseppe Caronia". Dizionario Biografico degli Italiani (in Italian). Vol. 34: Primo supplemento A–C. Rome: Istituto dell'Enciclopedia Italiana. ISBN 978-88-12-00032-6.
- Italo Farnetani, Francesca Farnetani, La top twelve della ricerca italiana, « Minerva Pediatrica» 2015; 67 (5): pp.437-450 .
- Italo Farnetani, Qualche notazione di storia della pediatria, in margine alla V edizione di Pediatria Essenziale, Postfazione. In Burgio G.R.( (a cura di). Pediatria Essenziale. 5a Ed. Milano: Edi-Ermes; 2012. ISBN 9788870512250. vol. 2°, pp. 1757-1764.
