= Andrés Manjón =

Venerable Andrés Manjón y Manjón
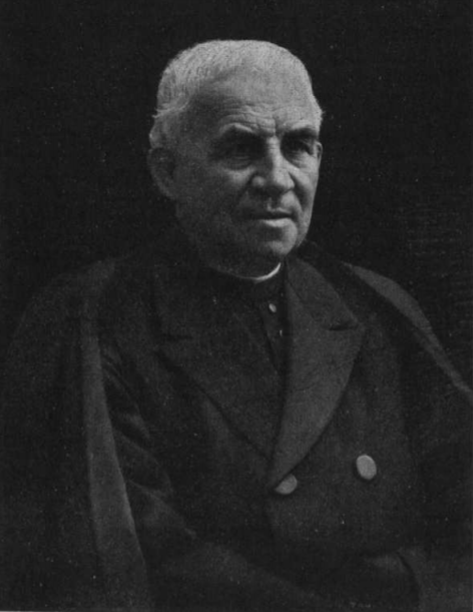
- Pictured c. 1910.
- Born: 30 November 1846; Sargentes de Lora, Burgos, Kingdom of Spain
- Died: 10 July 1923 (aged 76); Granada, Spanish Kingdom
- Venerated in: Roman Catholic Church
- Attributes: Priest's cassock
- Patronage: Ave Maria Schools

Andrés Manjón y Manjón (Sargentes de la Lora, 30 November 1846 – 10 July 1923) was a Spanish priest and educator who founded the Escuelas del Ave-María (Schools of Ave Maria) in Granada. He was ordained to the priesthood on 16 June 1886.

A cause for Manjón's beatification was opened on 10 May 1951. Pope Francis named him as Venerable on 23 November 2020.
