= Eduardo Benot =

Spanish author

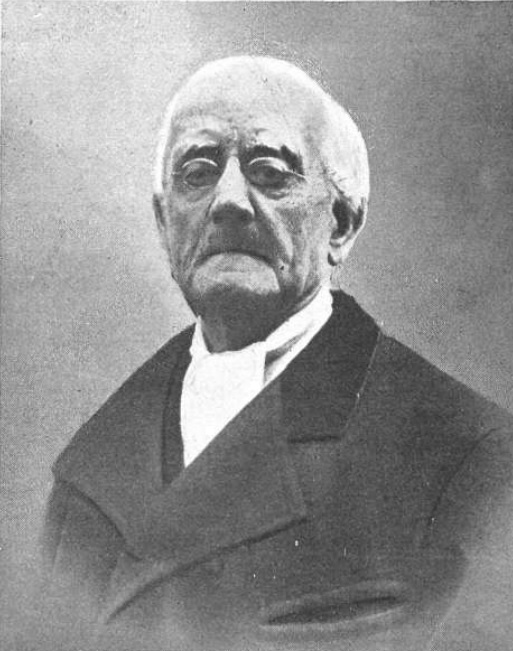

Ministry of Development
- In office 11 – 28 June 1873
- Preceded by: Eduardo Chao
- Succeeded by: Ramón Pérez Costales

Member of the Congress of Deputies
- In office 29 March 1893 – 1 July 1895
- Constituency: Madrid

Member of the Congress of Deputies
- In office 5 June 1873 – 8 January 1874
- Constituency: Algeciras (Cádiz)

Senator
- In office 1872–1873
- Constituency: Province of Girona

Member of the Congress of Deputies
- In office 16 February 1869 – 2 January 1871
- Constituency: Jerez de la Frontera (Cádiz)

Seat Z of the Real Academia Española
- In office 14 April 1889 – 27 July 1907
- Preceded by: Cándido Nocedal
- Succeeded by: José Rodríguez Carracido

Personal details
- Born: 26 November 1822 Cádiz, Spain
- Died: 27 July 1907 (aged 84) Madrid, Spain
- Party: Federal Democratic Republican Party
- Occupation: Politician, lexicographer, poet, educator, academic, editor, journalist, mathematician, playwright, academic

Eduardo Benot Rodríguez (26 November 1822 – 27 July 1907) was a Spanish lexicographer, academic, poet, educator and politician advocate of federal republicanism. Follower of Francisco Pi y Margall, he briefly served as Minister of Development during the First Spanish Republic.

== Biography ==
=== Early life ===
Born in Cádiz on 26 November 1822, his father had Italian origin. He was a feeble child during infancy. He took studies at the Colegio de San Pedro and later the Colegio de San Felipe Neri.

Already writing as teenager for the newspaper El Defensor del Pueblo, he later wrote for La Alborada, as well he authored 3 theatre pieces.

Working since 1840 for the municipal beneficence office, he was hired as teacher at San Felipe Neri in 1848 (soon starting to publish grammar books), and as lecturer on Geodesy and Astronomy at the Naval Observatory in San Fernando (1857).

=== Sexenio Democrático ===
After the 1868 Glorious Revolution, Benot became a member of the Constituent Cortes formed upon the 1869 election in representation of the district of Jerez de la Frontera (Cádiz), overcoming Juan Prim at the election, although Prim was elected anyway as he was candidate in another district.

He was one of the supporters of a manifesto promoted by Francisco Pi y Margall on 10 May 1870 which reaffirmed on "pactist" federalism, in response to the so-called "Declaration of the Republican Press" (published on 7 May 1870), which attempted to resignify federalism as a simple administrative decentralization. He was later elected Senator in representation of the province of Girona in the 1872–1873 period.

Following the proclamation of the First Spanish Republic in February 1873, he earned again a seat at the Congress of Deputies in representation of the district of Algeciras (Cádiz) at the May 1873 election. He was appointed as Minister of Development of the executive power presided by Pi y Margall in June 1873.

His short ministerial tenure, barely 17 days, delivered the creation of the Instituto Geográfico y Estadístico (predecessor to both the National Geographical Institute and the National Statistics Institute), and the draft of the Ley de 24 de julio 1873, sobre el trabajo en los talleres y la instrucción en las escuelas de los niños obreros (published after his exit from government), the so-called "Benot Law" regulating child labour, entailing the first State intervention in labour relations ever in Spain. The law failed to be effectively enforced, however. He also forced ayuntamientos to pay for teachers' wage arrears. He was replaced by Ramón Pérez Costales at the ministerial portfolio.

He exiled after the 1874 coup of Pavía to Portugal, where he began to edit the bi-weekly La Europa, only to return to Madrid some time later, as Cánovas del Castillo achieved, via a requirement for expulsion to the Portuguese authorities, the forced return to Spain of Benot.

=== Later life ===
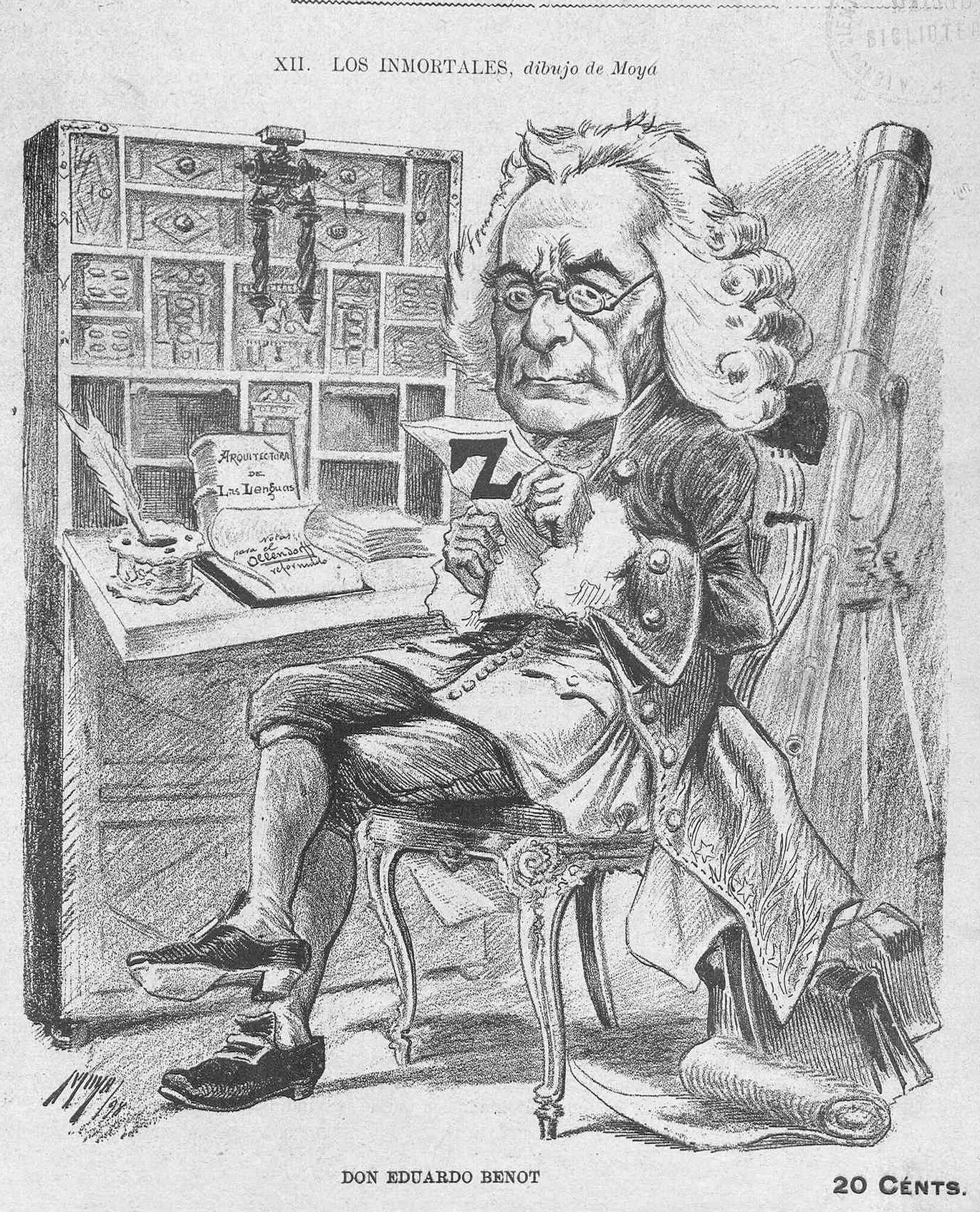
Caricature of Benot by Moya (Madrid Cómico)

Already a correspondent member of the Royal Spanish Academy since 1860, he was later elected as numerary member, taking possession of the Chair Z on 14 April 1889, reading ¿Qué es hablar? a speech replied by Víctor Balaguer. His contributions to Spanish grammar have received diverse and lavish praises, but they tend to agree in pointing out the "modernity" of his approaches, sometimes even considered to be a "direct precursor" of "modern linguistics".

Benot would return to the Lower House, elected in representation of Madrid at the 1893 election.

He replaced Pi y Margall at the helm of the Federal Democratic Republican Party when the latter died. He could not however avoid the fracture of the party in May 1905. Catalanist republicans would reject from then on the insertion within the main stem of the Spanish left-wing.

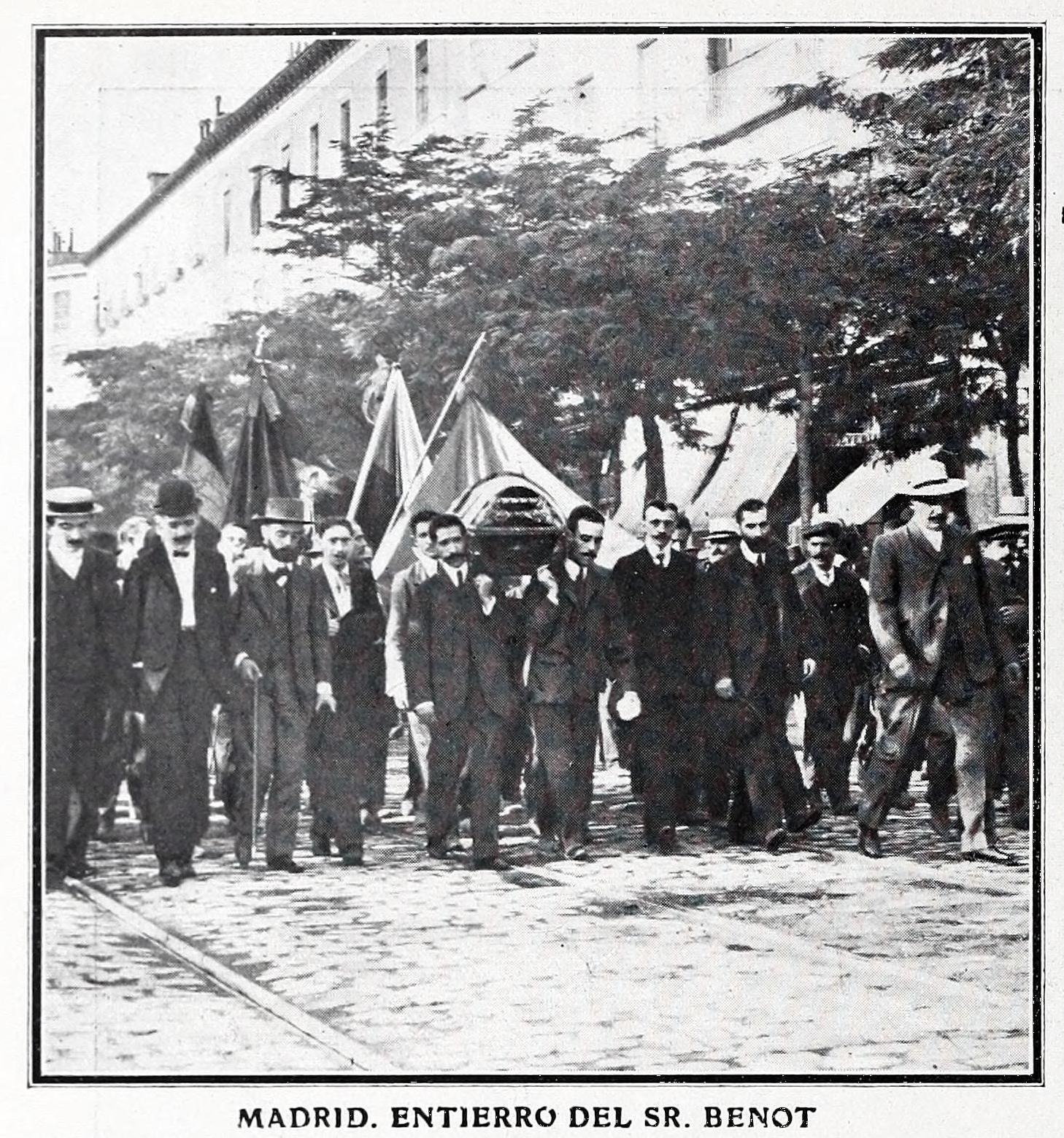
Burial procession of Benot in Madrid

Ill and progressively blind since 1901, he died poor at Calle del Marqués de Villamagna 6, Madrid, on 27 July 1907. The funeral procession that took place on the next day was attended by Picón, Fernández y González, Azcárate, Salmerón and Labra and by an attendance formed chiefly by republican sympathizers. Benot was buried at the Civil Cemetery in the Necrópolis del Este, in the same tomb Pi y Margall had been initially buried prior to the transfer of its corpse to a specific mausoleum funded via popular subscription.

Government offices
Preceded by Eduardo Chao	Ministry of Development; 1873	Succeeded by Ramón Pérez Costales
Academic offices
Preceded by Cándido Nocedal	Member of the Royal Spanish Academy (Chair Z); 1889–1907	Succeeded by José Rodríguez Carracido
