= Wolfgang Golther =

German philologist

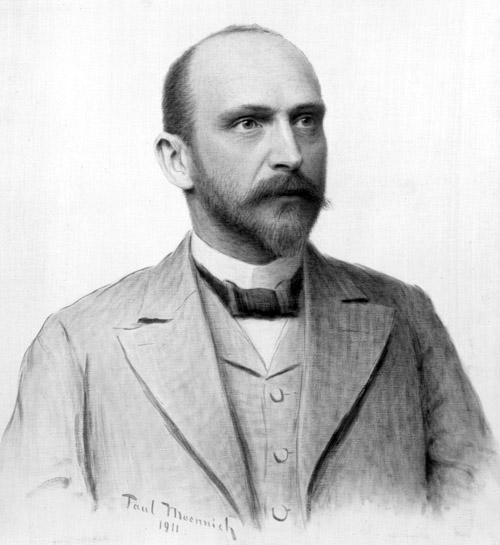
- Born: 25 May 1863; Stuttgart, Kingdom of Württemberg
- Died: 14 December 1945 (aged 82); Rostock, Germany

Academic background
- Education: Ludwig-Maximilians-Universität München

Academic work
- Discipline: Germanic philology
- Sub-discipline: German philology; Old Norse philology
- Institutions: University of Rostock
- Main interests: Germanic religion; Medieval German literature; Old Norse literature; Richard Wagner

Wolfgang Golther (25 May 1863 – 14 December 1945) was a German philologist who specialized in Germanic studies. A professor at the University of Rostock, Golther was a prominent authority on Medieval German literature and Germanic religion.

== Biography ==
Wolfgang Golther was born in Stuttgart, Kingdom of Württemberg on 25 May 1863, the son of Ludwig von Golther (1823-1876) and Fanny Autenrieth. His father was a prominent public official in the Kingdom of Württemberg. The family was Protestant.

Golther gained his abitur in Stuttgart in 1881. In 1882-1883 he served in the German Army. Since 1882, Golther studied Germanic philology and Romance languages and literature at the Ludwig-Maximilians-Universität München. He obtained his Ph.D. in Munich in 1886 with a thesis on The Song of Roland. He habilitated in Munich in 1888 with a thesis on Tristan and Iseult.

Golther served as a lecturer in Germanic philology in Munich from 1885 to 1895. From 1885 to 1934, Golther was Professor of German and Modern Literature at the University of Rostock. During this time he also served as Director of the German-Philological Seminar (1895-1934), Dean (1902-1903), Senior Librarian (1907-1934), Rector (1909-1910) and Vice Rector (1910-1911). He received the Bavarian Maximilian Order for Science and Art in 1912.

Golther retired from Rostock in 1934, but continued to be affiliated with the university as Honorary Professor of German Philology. He received the Goethe-Medaille für Kunst und Wissenschaft in 1939. Golther died in Rostock on 14 December 1945.

== Selected works ==
- Deutsche Heldensage. Ehlermann, Berlin/ Dresden/ Leipzig 1894, DNB-IDN 579997294.
- Der Nibelunge Nôt, Sammlung Göschen, Leipzig 1907
- Die deutsche Dichtung im Mittelalter. Metzler Stuttgart 1912. (Marix Verlag, Wiesbaden 2005, ISBN 3-86539-002-1)
- Germanische Götter und Heldensagen. (Fourier, Wiesbaden 2003, ISBN 3-932412-44-3)
- Handbuch der Germanischen Mythologie 1908. (Marix Verlag, Wiesbaden 2004, ISBN 3-937715-38-X)
- Zur deutschen Sage und Dichtung: gesammelte Aufsätze. Behr, Berlin/ Leipzig 1914.
- Richard Wagner – Leben und Lebenswerk – Musikerbiographie. Reclam-Verlag, 1926.
- als Hrsg.: Heinrich von Kleist: Robert Guiskard, Herzog der Normänner. Reclam-Verlag, Stuttgart 1964, DNB-IDN 452445191.
- Parzival in der deutschen Literatur. 1929, DNB-IDN 579997359.
- Tristan und Isolde in der französischen und deutschen Dichtung des Mittelalters und der Neuzeit. de Gruyter, Berlin/ Leipzig 1929, DNB-IDN 451614364.
- Geschichte der deutschen Literatur Vol. 1. Von den ersten Anfängen bis zum Ausgang des Mittelalters, von Wolfgang Golther.- Vol. 2. Seit dem Ausgang des Mittelalters, von Karl Borinski

== Sources ==
- "Golther, Wolfgang". University of Rostock.
