= Knud Karl Krogh-Tonning =

Norwegian theologian

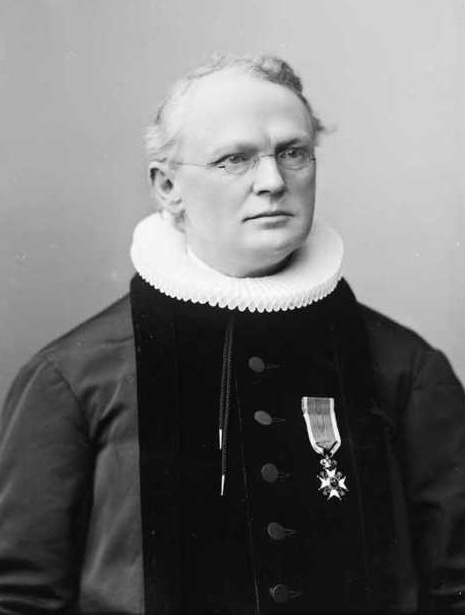
- Knud Karl Krogh-Tonning photographed by L. Szacinski, 1898
- Born: 31 December 1842; Stathelle, Norway
- Died: 19 February 1911 (aged 68); Oslo, Norway
- Occupations: Theologian, writer, clergyman

Knud Karl Krogh-Tonning (December 31, 1842 – February 19, 1911) was a Norwegian theologian known for his conversion to Catholicism.

== Biography ==
He was born at Stathelle, in the south of Norway, and graduated in 1861. He was manager of Læreskolen in Balestrand, and then in 1873 became Vicar of Årdal Municipality. After a number of other appointments he became pastor in Old Aker Church from 1886 to 1900. In autumn 1899 he applied to leave his position for reasons of conscience, and in 1900 he made public his conversion to Catholicism. His autobiographical En Konvertits Erindringer was published in 1906. He died at Kristiania, now Oslo, in 1911.

== Works ==
His works include:

- Kirkelige vidnesbyrd om absolutionen, 1881
- Om den ældste kirkelig apologi overfor det græsk-romerske hedenskabs tænkning, doctorate thesis, 1883
- Den Christelige dogmatik: Fundamentallære, 1885
- Christelig Opdragelselære, 1887
- Die Gnadenlehre und die Stille Reformation, 1894
- De Gratia Christi et de Libero Arbitrio Sancti Thomae Aquinatis, J. Dybwad, 1898
- En Konvertits Erindringer, 1906
- Katholisches Christentum, 1906
- Die heilige Birgitta von Schweden, 1907

=== Translated into English ===
- Catholic Christianity and the Modern World; a Course of Sermons, B. Herder, 1916.

== See also ==
- John Henry Newman
