= Alexander Baumgartner =

Swiss writer and priest (1841–1910)

Alexander Baumgartner SJ
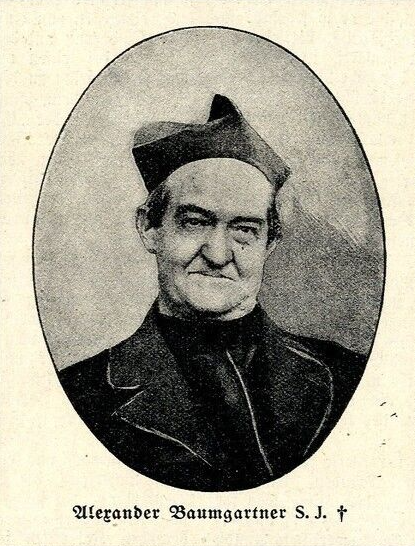
- Born: 27 June 1841; St. Gallen, Switzerland
- Died: 5 October 1910 (aged 69); Luxembourg City, Luxembourg

Alexander Baumgartner SJ (Swiss Standard German pronunciation: [ˌalɛˈksandər ˈbaʊ̯mˌɡartnər]; 27 June 1841 – 5 October 1910) was a Swiss poet and writer on the history of literature. He was nominated for the Nobel Prize in Literature three times.

== Life ==
His father was Gallus Jacob Baumgartner, a prominent statesman. At the abbey school of Maria Einsiedeln in Switzerland, where Alexander when fourteen years old began his higher studies, he was influenced by the poet and scholar Gall Morel. The boy's intellectual bent was confirmed at the Jesuit school at Feldkirch, where he spent his last two high school years. After passing an examination he entered the Society of Jesus in 1860. After his studies in 1874 he was assigned to the editorial staff of the periodical Stimmen aus Maria-Laach, which had been founded three years before. He wrote for the journal for thirty-six years, with writings of his appearing in virtually every issue. Owing to the expulsion of the Jesuits from Germany, he repeatedly changed the place of publication of the periodical.

He also took two long journeys. In 1883 he went to Iceland, the Faroe Islands, Scandinavia, and the provinces of the Baltic as far as St. Petersburg, Russia. Three years later he visited Denmark, Sweden, and Norway. Both tours are commemorated in his travel books, Nordische Fahrten (1889 and 1890). He was buried in the cemetery in Luxembourg near his old friend and countryman, the Jesuit Joseph Spillmann.

== Writings ==
Some of his poetry was written for special occasions, including Festspiel zur Calderonfeier (1881), which appeared first in the Stimmen aus Maria-Laach, but was soon, owing to repeated requests, published in book form with a brief biography of the Spanish poet Pedro Calderón de la Barca. A translation into Spanish by Juan Manuel Ortí y Lara of the artistic work soon followed. His Lauretanische Litanei in fifty-nine sonnets was also written for a special occasion and was printed for the first time in 1883 and translated into Dutch in 1890. He also translated foreign poetry, for instance, in 1884, an Icelandic poem of the fourteenth century to the Virgin Mary, Die Lilie.

He also wrote numerous articles on the history of literature in the Stimmen aus Maria-Laach, which were collected and issued in 1912 as a supplementary volume to his Geschichte der Weltliteratur, all written with the intent that they should form part of his larger history and life work. In earlier years, as preparatory writings, he had issued Lessings religiöser Entwicklungsgang (1877), Longfellow (1887), an appreciation of the poems of Henry Wadsworth Longfellow which passed into a second edition ten years later, Joost van den Vondel (1882), a biography of the Dutch author translated four years later into Dutch, and lastly a biography of Goethe in three volumes (1879).

In addition he published two works as expressions of gratitude and religious piety: Erinnerungen an Bischof Greith (1884), and Gallus Jakob Baumgartner (1892). Two years previously he had issued the unfinished work of his father, Die Geschichte des Kantons St. Gallen, in three volumes.

The six volumes of his history of the literature of the world are:

- Westasien und die Nilländer (1897)
- Indien und Ostasien (1897)
- Die klassische Literatur der Griechen und Römer (1900)
- Die lateinische und griechische Literatur der christlichen Völker (1900)
- Die französische Literatur (1905)
- Die italienische Literatur (1911)

The thoroughly Catholic point of view in all his works is self-evident. His strong religious convictions led him to take part in the dispute over Catholic literature by the publication of the pamphlet Die Stellung der deutschen Katholiken zur neueren Literatur.
