= Troels Troels-Lund =

Danish historian (1840–1921)

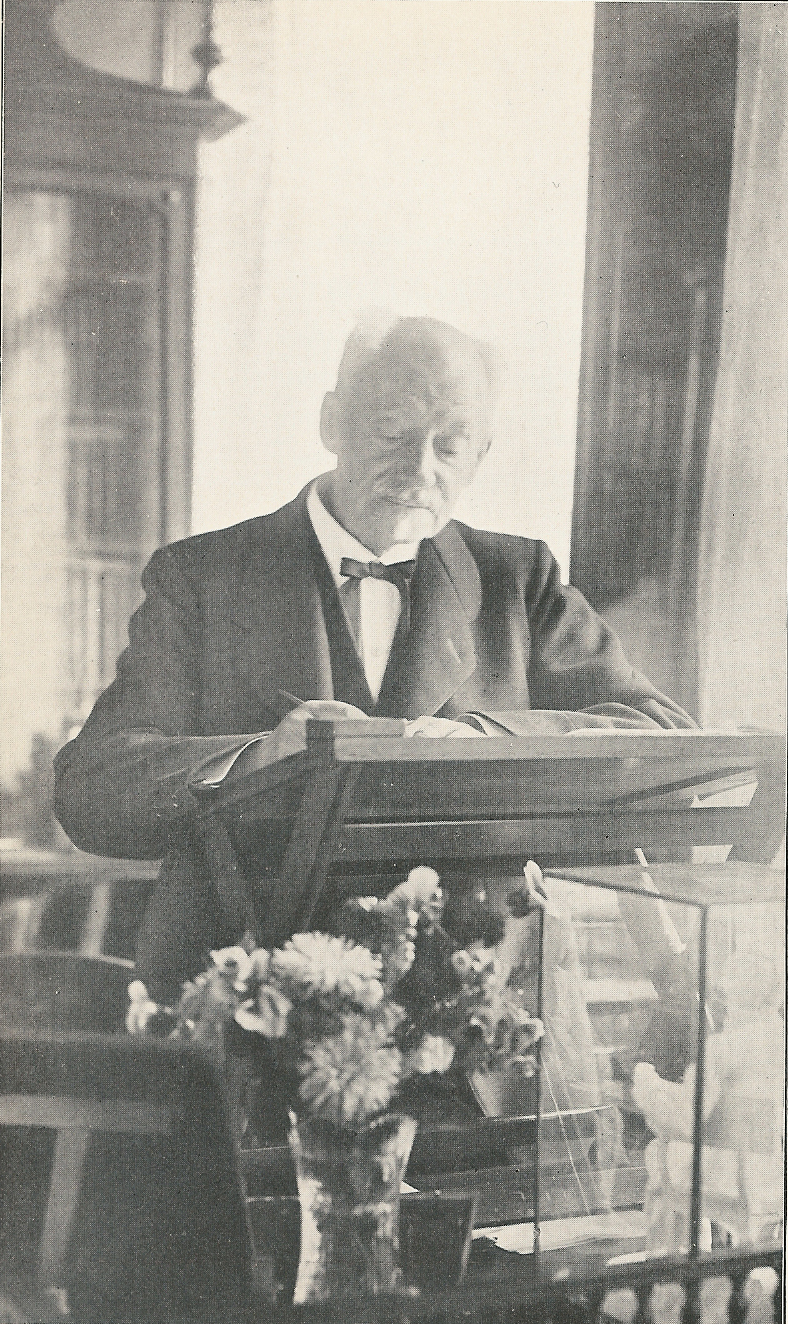
Troels-Lund, September 1920

Troels Frederik Troels-Lund (5 September 1840 – 12 February 1921) was a Danish historian.

== Biography ==
Troels-Lund was born in Copenhagen, the youngest son of Henrik Ferdinand and Anna Cathrine Lund. Henrik Ferdinand's first marriage was to Søren Kierkegaard's sister Petrea, from 1828 until her death in 1834. Henrik Ferdinand was also the brother of the naturalist Peter Wilhelm Lund.

Troels-Lund entered the University of Copenhagen in 1858. After studying theology for a while he abandoned it for the study of history. From 1870 to 1875 he was an assistant at the Gehejmearkivet, and an instructor in history at the Royal Danish Military Academy starting in 1874, serving as a full professor there from 1888 to 1900.

His most prominent work, Dagligt Liv i Norden i det sekstende Aarhundrede (transl. Daily Life in the North in the Sixteenth Century), was published in 14 volumes from 1879 to 1901. The work vividly detailed everyday life in sixteenth century Scandinavia, and is considered a characteristic example of Danish cultural history. He was appointed to the position of official historian of the Danish system of orders in 1897, and was admitted to the Royal Danish Academy of Sciences and Letters in 1901.

== Works ==
Troels-Lund's first work, Historiske Skitser, did not appear until 1876, but after that time his activity was stupendous. In 1879 the first volume of his Danmarks og Norges Historie i Slutningen of det Xvi. Aarhundrede, a history of daily life in Denmark and Norway at the close of the 16th century, was published. His work said little about kings, armies and governments, but instead concentrated attention on the lives of the ordinary men and women of the age with which he deals. He used these common people to illustrate a vast body of documents previously neglected by the official historians.

=== List ===
- Paa Vandring, 1867 (under pseudonym Poul Vedel)
- Historiske Skitser - Efter utrykte Kilder, 1876
- Mogens Heinesøn - Et tidsbillede fra det 16 Aarhundrede, 1877
- Dagligt Liv i Norden i det sekstende Aarhundrede I-XIV, 1879–1901 (First edition under title Danmark og Norges Historie i Slutningen af det 16de Aarhundrede, transl. History of Denmark and Norway to the End of the Sixteenth Century)
- Om Danmarks Forsvar, 1880
- Preussens fald og Genoprejsning, 1883
- Om Danmarks Neutralitet, 1886
- Christian den Fjerdes Skib paa Skanderborg Sø I-II, 1893
- Livsbelysning, 1899
- Sundhedsbegreber i Norden i det 16de Aarhundrede, 1900
- Peder Oxe, 1906
- De tre Nordiske Brødrefolk, 1906
- Nye Tanker i det 16de Aarhundrede, 1909
- Historiske Fortællinger - Tider og Tanker I-IV, 1910–1912
- Bakkehus og Solbjerg - Træk af et nyt Livssyns Udvikling i Norden I-III, 1920–1922
- Et Liv - Barndom og Ungdom, 1924

== Sources ==
- Chisholm, Hugh, ed. (1911). "Lund, Troels Frederik" . Encyclopædia Britannica (11th ed.). Cambridge University Press.
- Heiberg, Steffen (31 August 2024). "kulturhistorie". Den Store Danske Encyklopædi (in Danish). Archived from the original on 14 January 2025 – via Lex.dk.
- Stoklund, Bjarne (7 May 2020). "T.F. Troels-Lund". Den Store Danske Encyklopædi (in Danish). Archived from the original on 14 January 2025 – via Lex.dk.
- Tandrup, Leo (16 October 2023). "Troels Troels-Lund". Dansk Biografisk Leksikon (in Danish). Archived from the original on 28 May 2024 – via Lex.dk.
- Watkin, Julia (2001). Historical Dictionary of Kierkegaard's Philosophy. Historical Dictionaries of Religions, Philosophies, and Movements. Scarecrow Press. ISBN 978-0-8108-3817-8.
