= Lewis Morris (1833–1907) =

Welsh poet (1833–1907)

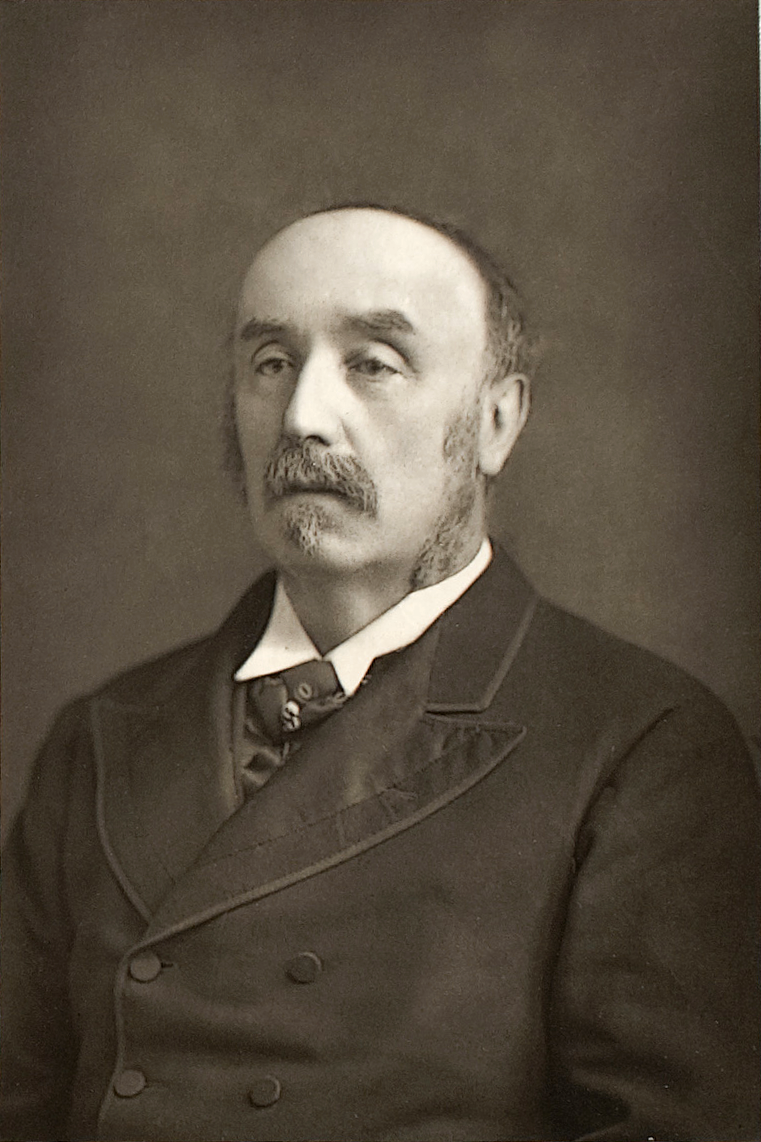
Lewis Morris

Sir Lewis Morris (23 January 1833 – 12 November 1907) was a Welsh academic and politician. He was also a popular poet of the Anglo-Welsh school.

== Background ==
Born in Carmarthen, Carmarthenshire in south-west Wales to Lewis Edward William Morris and Sophia Hughes, he first attended Queen Elizabeth's Grammar School there (1841–47). Then in 1847 he transferred to Cowbridge Grammar School on the appointment to it of the energetically reviving and academically gifted young headmaster, Hugo Harper. There "he gave promise of his future classical scholarship by writing a prize poem on Pompeii". In 1850 he was one of about thirty Cowbridge boys who followed Harper to Sherborne whither the latter was bound on a similar mission of resuscitating a moribund school. Such "swarming" in the wake of a charismatic headmaster was typical of the period. Morris and Harper remained lifelong friends. He studied classics at Jesus College, Oxford, graduating in 1856: the first student in thirty years to obtain first-class honours in both his preliminary and his final examinations. In 1868 he married Florence Pollard.

== Career ==
He then became a lawyer. He was Liberal candidate for Pembroke Boroughs in 1886 but lost to his Conservative opponent. He was Liberal candidate for Carmarthen Boroughs in 1892 but retired before the poll. He was knighted by Queen Victoria in 1895, and narrowly missed being appointed Poet Laureate, possibly because of his association with Oscar Wilde. One of his most famous poems is "Love's Suicide".

He is buried at the parish church of Saint Cynnwr in Llangunnor.

== Principal works ==
- Songs of Two Worlds 1875
- The Epic of Hades 1877
- Gwen: A Drama in Monologue Six Acts 1879
- The Ode of Life 1880
- Poetical Works 1882
- Songs Unsung 1883
- Gycia: A Tragedy in Five Acts 1886
- Songs of Britain 1887
- Selections from the Works of Sir Lewis Morris 1897
- Harvest Tide: A Book of Verse 1900
- The New Rambler from Desk to Platform 1905
