= 1910 Nobel Prize in Literature =

- Paul von Heyse
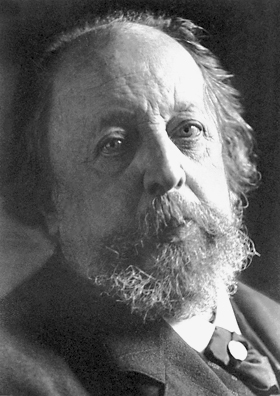
- "as a tribute to the consummate artistry, permeated with idealism, which he has demonstrated during his long productive career as a lyric poet, dramatist, novelist and writer of world-renowned short stories."
- Date: 10 November 1910 (announcement); 10 December 1910 (ceremony)
- Location: Stockholm, Sweden
- Presented by: Swedish Academy
- First award: 1901
- Website: Official website

The 1910 Nobel Prize in Literature was awarded to the German writer Paul Heyse (1830–1914) "as a tribute to the consummate artistry, permeated with idealism, which he has demonstrated during his long productive career as a lyric poet, dramatist, novelist and writer of world-renowned short stories." He is the third German recipient of the prize after Rudolf Christoph Eucken in 1908.

== Laureate ==
Paul Heyse translated Italian poetry in addition to writing short tales, poems, novels, and plays. He belonged to Die Krokodile and Tunnel über der Spree, two literary organizations. Heyse's became better known as a writer of short stories with his famous works Der Jungbrunnen ("The Fountain of Youth", 1850) and L'Arrabiata ("The Fury", 1852), which is one of his most well-known novellas. The emphasis of Heyse's writings is on individuality and freedom.

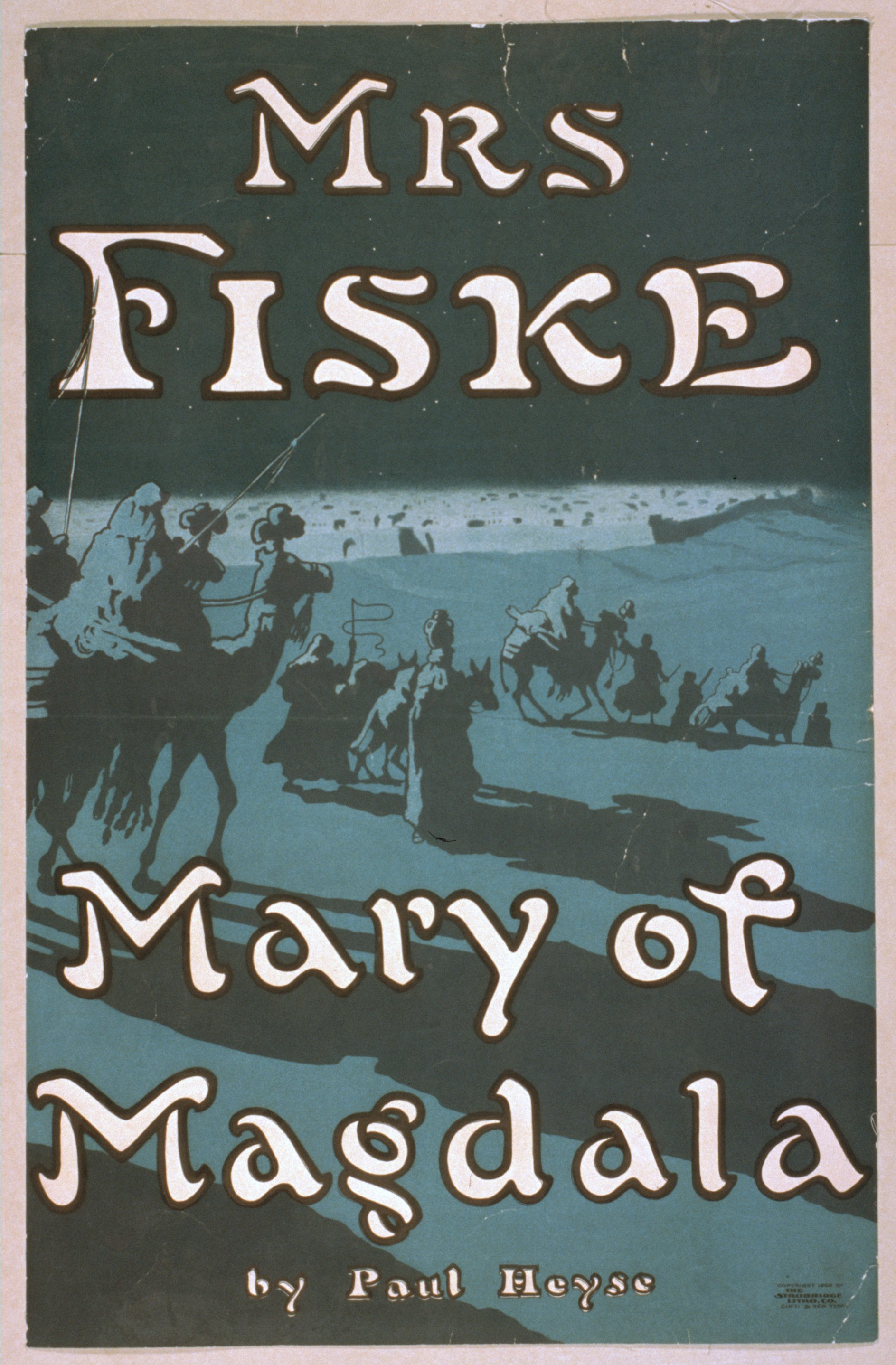
Mary of Magdala (1902), a play by Paul Heyse.

He was dubbed Dichterfürst o prince of poetry, and he worked tirelessly to promote international understanding within Europe. His last published works were Letzten Novellen ("Recent Novellas") and Italienischen Volksmärchen ("Italian Folktales", 1914).

== Deliberations ==
=== Nominations ===
Heyse had not been nominated for the prize before 1910, making it one of the rare occasions when an author have been awarded the Nobel Prize in Literature the same year they were first nominated. The nomination for Paul Heyse was made by a great number of professors and others in Munich, Berlin, Breslau, Halle, Leipzig and Vienna.

In total, the Nobel Committee of the Swedish Academy received 27 nominations for 25 writers, among them Georg Brandes, Juhani Aho, and Ángel Guimerá. Twelve of the nominees were nominated first-time including Thomas Hardy, Andrew Lang, Robert Bridges, William Dean Howells, Alfred Fouillée, Gustav Warneck, Édouard Rod, Pierre Loti. Two of the nominees were women and both were also nominated first-time: American historian Molly Elliot Seawell and Austrian novelist Marie von Ebner-Eschenbach.

The authors Giuseppe Cesare Abba, Vittoria Aganoor, Otto Julius Bierbaum, Samuel Langhorne Clemens (known as Mark Twain), Frederick James Furnivall, Julia Ward Howe, William James, Emil Friedrich Kautzsch, Maria Konopnicka, William Vaughn Moody, George Panu, William Sydney Porter (known as O. Henry), Wilhelm Raabe, Jules Renard, Bertilda Samper Acosta, Florencio Sánchez, Catherine Helen Spence, and Toini Topelius died in 1910 without having been nominated for the prize. The Swiss novelist Édouard Rod died months before the announcement.

Official list of nominees and their nominators for the prize
No.	Nominee	Country	Genre(s)	Nominator(s)
1	Juhani Aho (1861–1921)	Russia (Finland)	novel, short story	Leo Mechelin (1839–1914)
2	Wilhelm Benignus (1861–1930)	Germany; United States	short story, poetry, essays	Marion Dexter Learned (1857–1917)
3	Georg Brandes (1842–1927)	Denmark	literary criticism, essays	Yrjö Hirn (1870–1952) (Note: The nomination was made jointly by W. Söderhjelm and Y. Hirn, both members of the Finnish Scientific Society); Werner Söderhjelm (1859–1931)
4	Robert Bridges (1844–1930)	Great Britain	poetry, essays	Charles Villiers Stanford (1852–1924)
5	William Chapman (1850–1917)	Canada	poetry, translation	Amédée Gosselin (1863–1941)
6	Francesco D'Ovidio (1849–1925)	Italy	philology, literary criticism	Ernesto Monaci (1844–1918)
7	Antonio Fogazzaro (1842–1911)	Italy	novel, poetry, short story	Eugène-Melchior de Vogüé (1848–1910)
8	Alfred Fouillée (1838–1912)	France	philosophy	Carl David af Wirsén (1842–1912)
9	Anatole France (1844–1924)	France	poetry, essays, drama, novel, literary criticism	Paul Hervieu (1857–1915)
10	Martin Greif (1839–1911)	Germany	poetry, drama	August Sauer (1855–1926)
11	Ángel Guimerá Jorge (1845–1924)	Spain	drama, poetry	20 members of the Reial Acadèmia de Bones Lletres de Barcelona
12	Thomas Hardy (1840–1928)	Great Britain	novel, short story, poetry	6 members of the Society of Authors
13	Paul Heyse (1830–1914)	Germany	poetry, drama, novel, short story	professors in Munich, Berlin, Breslau, Halle, Leipzig and Vienna
14	William Dean Howells (1837–1920)	United States	novel, short story, literary criticism, drama	Brander Matthews (1852–1929)
15	Andrew Lang (1844–1912)	Great Britain	poetry, novel, short story, essays, literary criticism, translation	Edith Nesbit (1858–1924)
16	Ernest Lavisse (1842–1922)	France	history	Frédéric Masson (1847–1923)
17	Pierre Loti (1850–1923)	France	novel, short story, autobiography, essays	Gabriel Hanotaux (1853–1944)
18	Maurice Maeterlinck (1862–1949)	Belgium	drama, poetry, essays	Carl Bildt (1850–1931)
19	Marcelino Menéndez Pelayo (1856–1912)	Spain	history, philosophy, philology, poetry, translation, literary criticism	4 members of the Royal Spanish Academy
20	John Morley (1838–1923)	Great Britain	biography, literary criticism, essays	28 members of the Society of Authors
21	Édouard Rod (1857–1910)	Switzerland; France	novel, short story, essays, literary criticism	Edmond Rossier (1865–1945)
22	Salvador Rueda Santos (1857–1933)	Spain	poetry, essays	7 professors at the Complutense University of Madrid
23	Molly Elliot Seawell (1860–1916)	United States	history, novel, short story	Charles William Kent (1860–1917)
24	Marie von Ebner-Eschenbach (1830–1916)	Austria-Hungary	novel, short story, drama	Emil Reich (1854–1910)
25	Gustav Warneck (1834–1910)	Germany	theology, history	Carl Mirbt (1860–1929) (Note: The nomination was made by a great number of missionary societies and individuals, of whom J. Ficker and C. Mirbt are considered qualified nominators.); Johannes Ficker (1861–1944)

=== Prize decision ===
The Nobel committee proposed that the Nobel prize in Literature in 1910 should be awarded to the German author Paul Heyse: "Since Paul Heyse is such an accomplished artist, the Nobel Committee considers itself unable to pass him over in this year's Nobel Prize selection, but proposes him first of all. He should have come to mind long before; but one would have liked to have him proposed from Germany, and this has, strangely enough, only happened this year."

The committee praised Heyse's work and described his numerous short stories as "mostly perfect masterpieces", but had some doubts that Heyse's advanced age could be an obstacle for the Swedish Academy to award him the prize. For that reason they proposed the Belgian writer Maurice Maeterlinck (awarded the following year) as a second, alternative proposal. Other writers considered but rejected for the 1910 prize included French author Anatole France (subsequently awarded the 1921 Nobel Prize in Literature) and English novelist and poet Thomas Hardy.

On 10 November 1910 the Swedish Academy decided to award that year's Nobel Prize in Literature to Paul Heyse "as a tribute to the consummate artistry, permeated with idealism, which he has demonstrated during his long productive career as a lyric poet, dramatist, novelist and writer of world-renowned short stories."

== Reactions ==
The Nobel Prize to Paul Heyse did not receive much attention in his native Germany. Responses outside the German-speaking world were far more numerous. Particularly in Italy appreciations appeared in many publications, as well as notices in French newspapers such as Le Figaro.
