= 1911 Nobel Prize in Literature =

- Maurice Maeterlinck
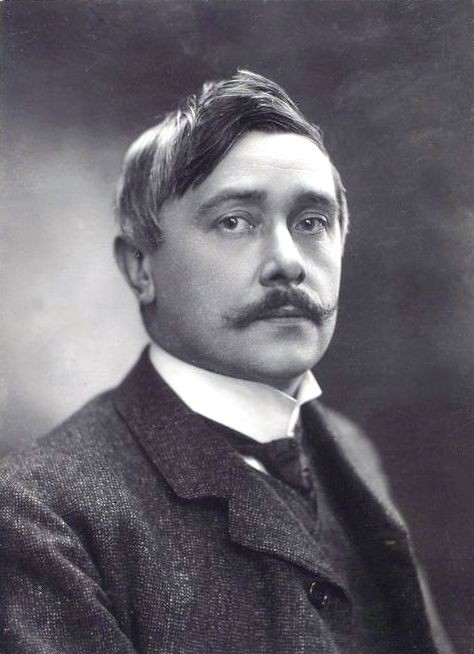
- "in appreciation of his many-sided literary activities, and especially of his dramatic works, which are distinguished by a wealth of imagination and by a poetic fancy, which reveals, sometimes in the guise of a fairy tale, a deep inspiration, while in a mysterious way they appeal to the readers' own feelings and stimulate their imaginations."
- Date: 9 November 1911 (announcement); 10 December 1911 (ceremony)
- Location: Stockholm, Sweden
- Presented by: Swedish Academy
- First award: 1901
- Website: Official website

The 1911 Nobel Prize in Literature was awarded to the Belgian author Maurice Maeterlinck (1862–1949) "in appreciation of his many-sided literary activities, and especially of his dramatic works, which are distinguished by a wealth of imagination and by a poetic fancy, which reveals, sometimes in the guise of a fairy tale, a deep inspiration, while in a mysterious way they appeal to the readers' own feelings and stimulate their imaginations." He is the first and remains the only Belgian recipient of the prize.

== Laureate ==
Maeterlinck was a symbolist and agnostic who explored the inner lives of people and the subconscious in his surreal plays and poems. His dramas frequently feature shifting and ambiguous milieux and epochs, which enhances the symbolism. He made his debut with the play La Princesse Maleine ("Princess Maleine", 1889). Instead of expressing reality, he focused himself to generating feelings. Since human players would interact with the symbolic, several of Maeterlinck's plays were created for puppets. The puppets, he argued, were a potent representation of how fate controls people. His most famous plays include L'Intruse ("Intruder", 1890), Les Aveugles ("The Blind", 1890), Pelléas et Mélisande ("Pelléas and Mélisande", 1893), Intérieur ("Interior", 1895), and L'Oiseau bleu ("The Blue Bird", 1908).

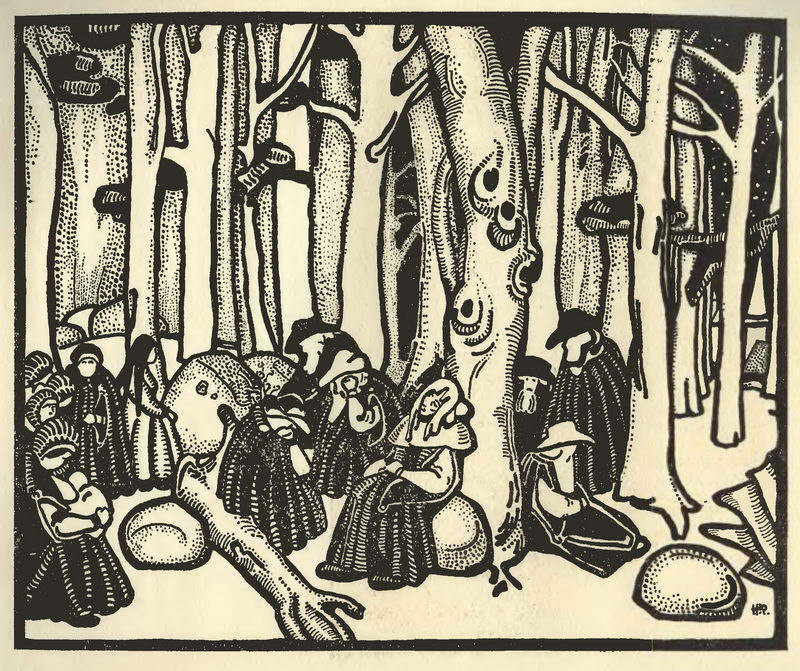
A 1906 illustration of the play by Nicholas Roerich.

== Deliberations ==
=== Nominations ===
Maeterlinck was nominated on 8 occasions (two nominations in 1903, three nominations in 1909, single nominations in 1904, 1910, and 1911). For the 1911 prize, which he was awarded eventually, he was nominated by Carl Bildt (1850–1931), member of the Swedish Academy.

In total, the Nobel Committee received 31 nominations for 28 writers. Eleven of the nominees were nominated first-time, among them Karl Adolph Gjellerup (awarded in 1917), Albert de Mun, Gustaf Fröding, George Bernard Shaw (awarded in 1925), Harald Høffding, Henry James, and Peter Rosegger. Two of the nominees were women namely the American historian Molly Elliot Seawell and Austrian writer Marie von Ebner-Eschenbach. The Swedish playwright August Strindberg was nominated for the prize but the nomination arrived too late and was retrieved and the nomination of French historian Ernest Lavisse was declared invalid by the Nobel Committee.

The authors Henry Abbey, Mikhail Albov, Ida Baccini, Vilhelm Bergsøe, Louis Henri Boussenard, Stanisław Brzozowski, Joaquín Costa, Fialho de Almeida, Amelia Denis de Icaza, George Cary Eggleston, W. S. Gilbert, Frances Harper, Knud Karl Krogh-Tonning, Francis March, Richard Barham Middleton, Philippe Monnier, Alexandros Papadiamantis, David Graham Phillips, Joseph Pulitzer, Howard Pyle, Emilio Salgari, Hannah Whitall Smith, Friedrich Spielhagen, Henrietta Stannard, Katherine Thurston, Marie Wexelsen, and Adolf Wilbrandt died in 1911 without having been nominated for the prize. Swedish poet Gustaf Fröding died months before the announcement.

Official list of nominees and their nominators for the prize
No.	Nominee	Country	Genre(s)	Nominator(s)
1	Juhani Aho (1861–1921)	Russia (Finland)	novel, short story	Leo Mechelin (1839–1914); Johan Wilhelm Ruuth (1854–1928)
2	Rafael Altamira Crevea (1866–1951)	Spain	history, pedagogy, law, essays	Aniceto Sela Sampil (1863–1935)
3	Francesco D'Ovidio (1849–1925)	Italy	philology, literary criticism	Ernesto Monaci (1844–1918)
4	Albert de Mun (1841–1914)	France	essays	René Bazin (1853–1932)
5	Antonio Fogazzaro (1842–1911)	Italy	novel, poetry, short story	Johan Vising (1855–1942)
6	Anatole France (1844–1924)	France	poetry, essays, drama, novel, literary criticism	Paul Hervieu (1857–1915) (Note: This nomination was not included in the list of nominations set by the Nobel Committee on Feb. 4, 1911, but was subsequently added later on.)
7	Gustaf Fröding (1860–1911)	Sweden	poetry	Simon Boëthius (1850–1924); Adolf Noreen (1854–1925)
8	Martin Greif (1839–1911)	Germany	poetry, drama	August Sauer (1855–1926)
9	Karl Adolph Gjellerup (1857–1919)	Denmark	poetry, drama, novel	Ludwig Schemann (1852–1938) (Note: The nomination was made by L. Schemann with the assent from several German writers.); Vilhelm Andersen (1864–1953) (Note: The nomination was made with assent from 5 other Danish professors and members of the Royal Danish Academy of Sciences and Letters); Harald Høffding (1843–1931)
10	Ángel Guimerá Jorge (1845–1924)	Spain	drama, poetry	16 members of the Reial Acadèmia de Bones Lletres de Barcelona
11	Thomas Hardy (1840–1928)	Great Britain	novel, short story, poetry	2 members of the Society of Authors
12	Harald Høffding (1843–1931)	Denmark	philosophy, theology	Christen Collin (1857–1926)
13	Henry James (1843–1916)	United States; Great Britain	novel, short story, drama, essays	3 members of the Society of Authors
14	Ernest Lavisse (1842–1922)	France	history	unnamed (Note: Nomination was declared invalid by the Nobel Committee)
15	Pierre Loti (1850–1923)	France	novel, short story, autobiography, essays	20 members of the Académie Française
16	Maurice Maeterlinck (1862–1949)	Belgium	drama, poetry, essays	Carl Bildt (1850–1931)
17	John Morley (1838–1923)	Great Britain	biography, literary criticism, essays	21 members of the Society of Authors
18	Peter Rosegger (1843–1918)	Austria-Hungary	poetry, essays	Emil Reich (1854–1910) (Note: The nominees P. Rosegger and K. Schönherr were added to M. von Ebner-Eschenbach's nomination by the Nobel Committee.)
19	Salvador Rueda Santos (1857–1933)	Spain	poetry, essays	professors of Cardinal Cisneros Institute; members of the Los Centros Españoles de Cuba
20	Karl Schönherr (1867–1943)	Austria-Hungary	drama, short story, poetry	Emil Reich (1854–1910)
21	Molly Elliot Seawell (1860–1916)	United States	history, novel, short story	Charles William Kent (1860–1917)
22	George Bernard Shaw (1856–1950)	Great Britain and Ireland	drama, essays, novel	Gilbert Murray (1866–1957)
23	Georgios Souris (1853–1919)	Greece	poetry, songwriting	Hellenic Philological Society of Constantinople (Note: The nomination was made by the president and secretary of the Hellenic Philological Society in Constantinople, Turkey.)
24	August Strindberg (1849–1912)	Sweden	drama, novel, poetry, essays	Nathan Söderblom (1866–1931) (Note: August Strindberg was nominated once in 1911 by Nathan Söderblom but the nomination arrived too late and was retrieved by the Nobel Committee.)
25	Ernst von der Recke (1848–1933)	Denmark	poetry, drama	Ewert Wrangel (1863–1940); 20 professors and members of Royal Danish Academy of Sciences and Letters
26	Marie von Ebner-Eschenbach (1830–1916)	Austria-Hungary	novel, short story, drama	Emil Reich (1854–1910)
27	Verner von Heidenstam (1859–1940)	Sweden	novel, short story, poetry	Fredrik Wulff (1845–1930)
28	Jaroslav Vrchlický (1853–1912)	Russia (Czechoslovakia)	poetry, drama, translation	Arnošt Kraus (1859–1943)

=== Prize decision ===
Maeterlinck had been nominated for the prize in 1903, but his candidacy was then dismissed by the Nobel committee chairman Carl David af Wirsén saying that Maeterlinck's writing was partly too obscure, including motifs "of such embarrassing bizarre nature". He was nominated again in 1904, but again was not taken in consideration by the Nobel committee that year. Maeterlinck was nominated again in 1909 and his candidacy was then more positively dealt with by the Nobel committee. Carl David af Wirsén, who had earlier been strongly critical of Maeterlincks candidacy, now launched him as a main candidate for the prize. It has been speculated that Wirsén's reappraisal of Maeterlinck was a way of preventing that Selma Lagerlöf, deeply disliked by Wirsén, was awarded the prize, but also that Wirsén had reached a deeper understanding of Maeterlinck's works. Selma Lagerlöf was awarded the 1909 Nobel Prize in Literature and the following year Maeterlinck was again a strong contender for the prize. In 1911 Wirsén praised Maeterlinck's writing, concluding in his report that "Maeterlinck is (...) a poet of admirable power, and his versatility is, as shown above, surprisingly great. The Nobel committee may also this year propose him as recipient of the literary Nobel Prize. The choice will surely be liked in most quarters, because this poet enjoys a world reputation and his writings are widely read and accepted."

== Banquet speech ==
Maeterlinck was unable to partake in the Nobel award ceremony due to illness. Thus, Charles C.M.A. Wauters, Minister of Belgium, delivered Maeterlinck's speech. Prior to the speech, Prof. Karl Mörner, Director of the Royal Institute of Medicine and Surgery, expressed his disappointment that Maeterlinck was not able to be present at the ceremony whom he regarded as "a writer universally known and esteemed, whose poetic creations have filled us with enthusiasm."
