= 1909 Nobel Prize in Literature =

- Selma Lagerlöf
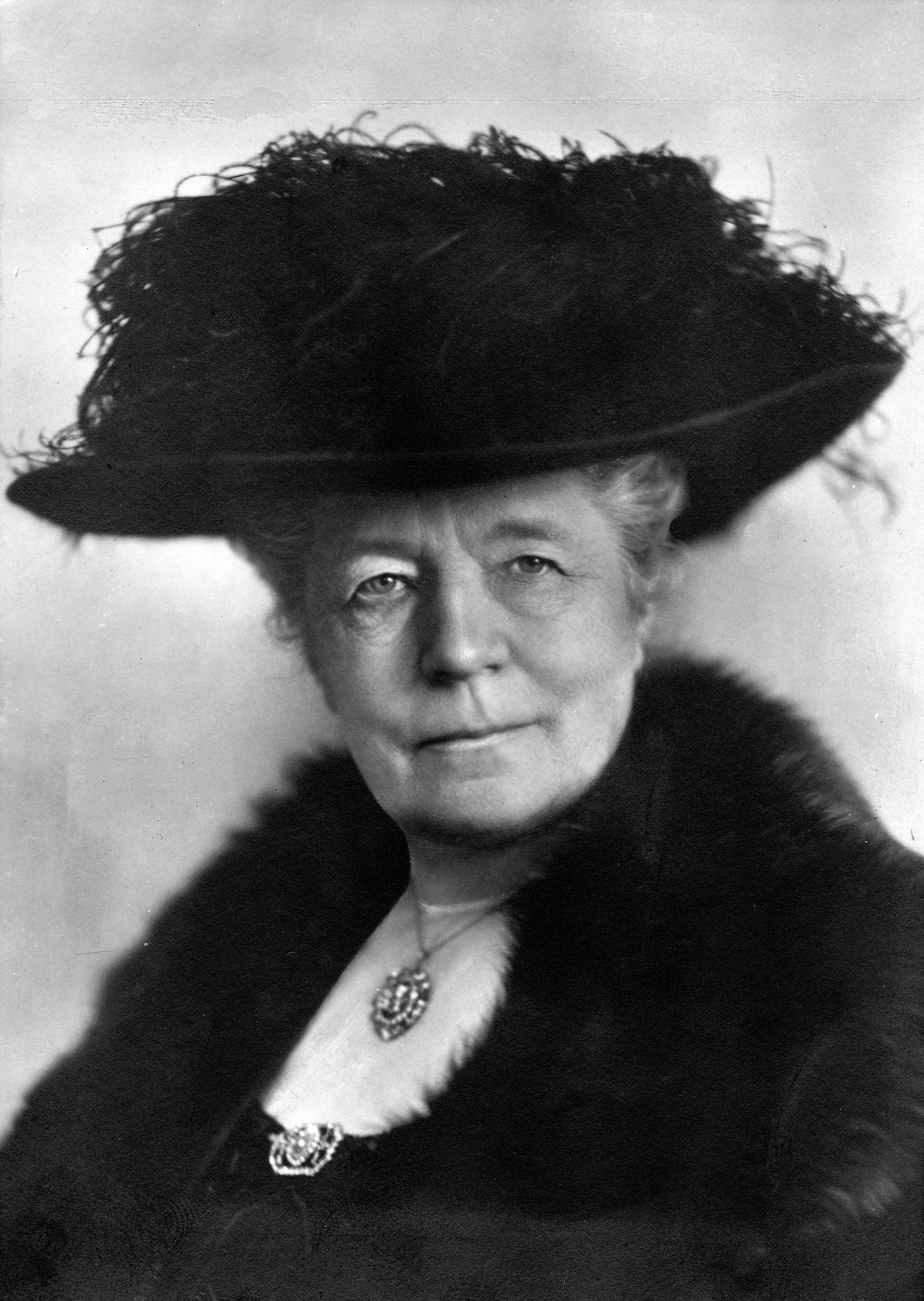
- "in appreciation of the lofty idealism, vivid imagination and spiritual perception that characterize her writings."
- Date: 11 November 1909 (announcement); 10 December 1909 (ceremony)
- Location: Stockholm, Sweden
- Presented by: Swedish Academy
- First award: 1901
- Website: Official website

The 1909 Nobel Prize in Literature was awarded to the Swedish author Selma Lagerlöf (1858–1940) "in appreciation of the lofty idealism, vivid imagination and spiritual perception that characterize her writings." She became the first woman and first Swede to be awarded the prize.

== Laureate ==
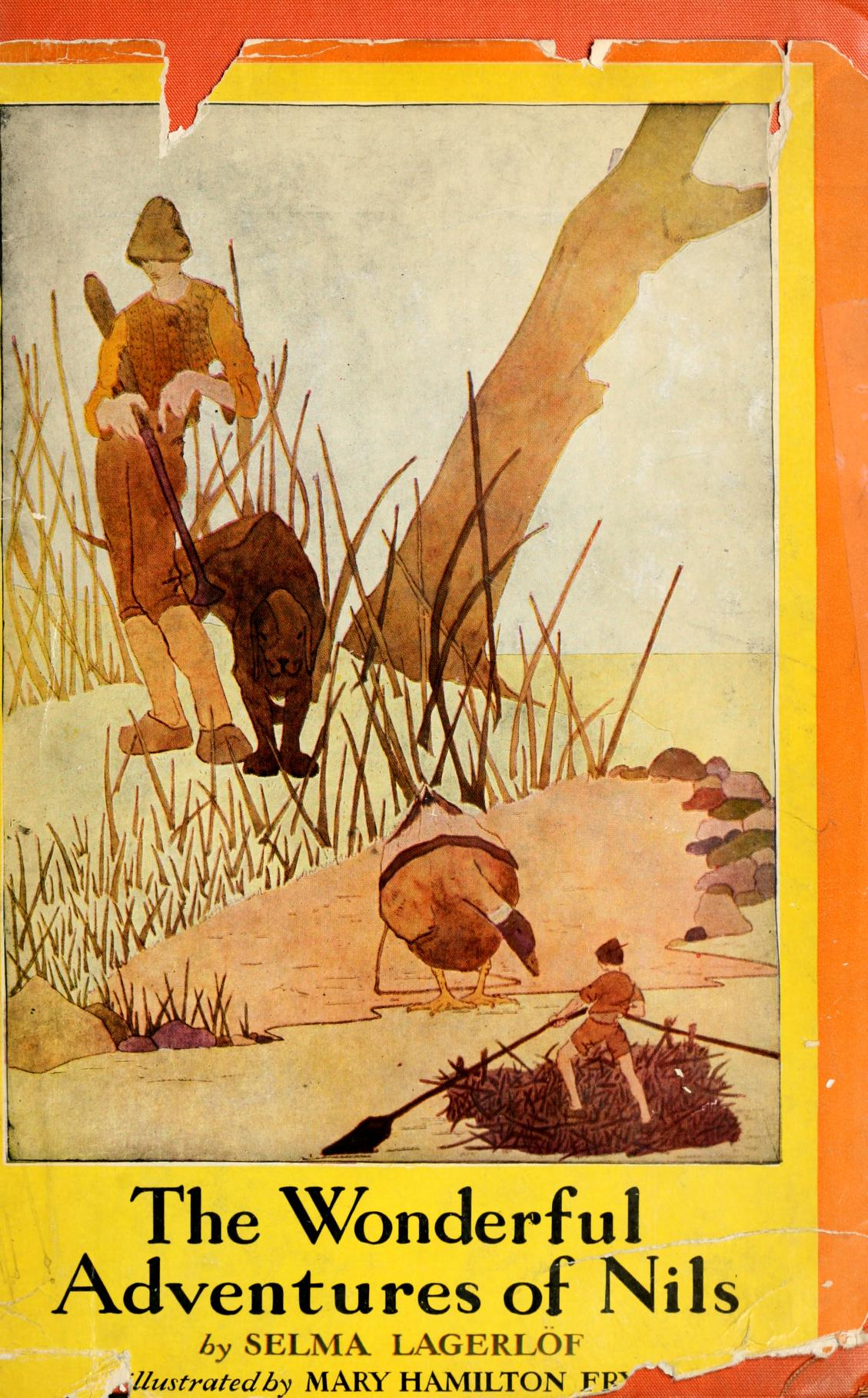
Cover of The Wonderful Adventures of Nils published 1906 and illustrated by Mary Hamilton Frye.

Selma Lagerlöf's authorship is deeply rooted in folk tales, legends, and stories from her home district in Värmland County, Sweden. Her début novel, Gösta Berling's Saga (1891), broke away from the then-prevailing realism and naturalism and is characterized by a vivid imagination. Even so, her works provide realistic depictions of people's circumstances, ideas, and social lives during the 19th-century religious revival. Lagerlöf wrote in prose and her stories characterized by a captivating descriptive power and their language by purity and clarity. Among her significant novels include Jerusalem (1901–02), Nils Holgerssons underbara resa genom Sverige ("The Wonderful Adventures of Nil", 1907), Körkarlen ("Thy Soul Shall Bear Witness!", 1912), and The Ring of the Löwenskölds (1925–28).

In 1914, Lagerlöf became a member of the Swedish Academy, the first woman to be so honored. She nominated Georg Brandes for the 1920 and 1922 Nobel prize.

== Deliberations ==
=== Nominations ===
Selma Lagerlöf received 28 nominations since 1904. Her highest number of nominations (11 nominations) were for the 1909 prize with which she was awarded eventually. In total, the Nobel committee received 38 nominations for 21 writers including Angelo de Gubernatis, Maurice Maeterlinck (awarded in 1911), Iwan Gilkin, and Jaroslav Vrchlický. Seven of the nominees were nominated for the first time including Ernest Lavisse, Verner von Heidenstam (awarded in 1916), Martin Greif, and Émile Verhaeren.

The authors Gustaf af Geijerstam, Innokenty Annensky, Jakub Bart-Ćišinski, Rosa Nouchette Carey, Euclides da Cunha, John Davidson, Amalia Domingo Soler, George Manville Fenn, Clyde Fitch, Jacob Gordin, Sarah Orne Jewett, Cesare Lombroso, Luis Alfredo Martínez, Clorinda Matto de Turner, Catulle Mendès, Alfredo Oriani, Signe Rink, John Millington Synge, Renée Vivien, Rudolf von Gottschall, Detlev von Liliencron, Ernst von Wildenbruch, and Egerton Ryerson Young died in 1909 without having been nominated for the prize.

Official list of nominees and their nominators for the prize
No.	Nominee	Country	Genre(s)	Nominator(s)
1	Paul Bourget (1852–1935)	France	novel, short story, literary criticism, essays	René Bazin (1853–1932)
2	Borden Parker Bowne (1847–1910)	United States	philosophy, theology, essays	Henry MacCracken (1840–1918)
3	Francesco D'Ovidio (1849–1925)	Italy	philology, literary criticism	Ernesto Monaci (1844–1918)
4	Angelo de Gubernatis (1840–1913)	Italy	drama, essays, philology, poetry	Angelo Valdarnini (1847–1930); Gaspare Finali (1829–1914); Paolo Boselli (1838–1932); Francesco Lorenzo Pullé (1850–1934)
5	Eugène-Melchior de Vogüé (1848–1910)	France	essays, literary criticism	Albert Vandal (1853–1910)
6	Anatole France (1844–1924)	France	poetry, essays, drama, novel, literary criticism	Paul Hervieu (1857–1915)
7	Iwan Gilkin (Note: Gilkin: Prométhée ("Prometheus", 1897)) (1858–1924)	Belgium	poetry	Ernest Discailles (1837–1914)
8	Martin Greif (1839–1911)	Germany	poetry, drama	20 professors from Breslau, Prague, Leipzig, Liège, Innsbruck, etc.
9	Ángel Guimerá Jorge (1845–1924)	Spain	drama, poetry	18 members of the Reial Acadèmia de Bones Lletres de Barcelona
10	Selma Lagerlöf (1858–1940)	Sweden	novel, short story	Ewert Wrangel (1863–1940); Otto Sylwan (1864–1954); Gustav Cederschiöld (1849–1928); Ludvig Stavenow (1864–1950); Johan Vising (1855–1942); Frits Läffler (1847–1921); Erik Brate (1857–1924); Eugène Lewenhaupt (1849–1927); Axel Olrik (1864–1917); Karl Johan Warburg (1852–1918); Hans Lange (1884–1960); Fredrik Wulff (1845–1930); Adolf Noreen (1854–1925); Gottfrid Billing (1841–1925); Claes Annerstedt (1839–1927); Harald Hjärne (1848–1922); Vitalis Norström (1856–1916); Waldemar Rudin (1833–1921); Albert Theodor Gellerstedt (1836–1914); Karl Alfred Melin (1849–1919); Carl Carlson Bonde (1850–1913)
11	Ernest Lavisse (1842–1922)	France	history	Frédéric Masson (1847–1923)
12	Salvador Rueda Santos (1857–1933)	Spain	poetry, essays	4 professors of the Complutense University of Madrid
13	Maurice Maeterlinck (1862–1949)	Belgium	drama, poetry, essays	Ernest Discailles (1837–1914); Belgian professors and Academy members
14	John Morley (1838–1923)	Great Britain	biography, literary criticism, essays	8 members of the British Society of Authors
15	Georgios Souris (1853–1919)	Greece	poetry, songwriting	Pavlos Karolidis (1849–1930) (Note: The nomination was made jointly by D. Patsopoulos and P. Karolidis.); Dimitrios Patsopoulos (1845–1920); members of the Parnassos Literary Society
16	Algernon Charles Swinburne (1837–1909)	Great Britain	poetry, drama, literary criticism, novel	31 members of the British Society of Authors; Carl Bildt (1850–1931)
17	Émile Verhaeren (1855–1916)	Belgium	poetry, essays	Ernest Discailles (1837–1914); Belgian professors and Academy members
18	Charles Wagner (Note: Wagner: Justice. Huit discours ("Justice: Eight Speeches", 1889), Sois un homme! Simples causeries sur la conduite de la vie ("Be a Man! Simple Discussions on How to Lead Life", 1889), Jeunesse ("Youth", 1895), Vie Simple ("Simple Life", 1895), L'âme des choses ("The Soul of Things", 1901), and Le long du chemin ("Along the Path", 1901)) (1852–1918)	France	theology, philosophy	Bernard Bouvier (1861–1941)
19	Verner von Heidenstam (1859–1940)	Sweden	novel, short story, poetry	Carl Carlson Bonde (1850–1913)
20	Jaroslav Vrchlický (1853–1912)	Austria-Hungary (Czechoslovakia)	poetry, drama, translation	Arnošt Kraus (1859–1943)
21	Alexandru Dimitrie Xenopol (1847–1920)	Romania	history, philosophy, essays	Ion Găvănescu (1859–1949)

=== Prize decision ===
Nobel committee chair Carl David af Wirsén had for years fiercely opposed the proposals to award Selma Lagerlöf the Nobel Prize in Literature. Wirsén advocated Algernon Swinburne who competed against Lagerlöf as the main candidate for the 1908 prize, but following Swinburne's death Lagerlöf received a strong support from the other members of the Swedish Academy in 1909. In addition to a joint nomination from eight members of the Swedish Academy, the Nobel committee received ten nominations for Lagerlöf from prominent professors in Sweden and Denmark, including one proposal of a shared prize to Lagerlöf and Verner von Heidenstam.

While Lagerlöf had a strong support by the members of the Swedish Academy as a whole, only two members of the Academy's Nobel committee advocated a prize to Lagerlöf, while the other three, including Wirsén, pushed for the Belgian writer Maurice Maeterlinck (subsequently awarded in 1911). In addition, Wirsén and committee member Hans Hildebrand, who both opposed a prize to Lagerlöf, also launched the French historian Ernest Lavisse as a candidate for the prize. Wirsén concluded in his report to the Academy: "Since only two committee members unconditionally recommended Selma Lagerlöf, the statement could not contain a proposal in her favor. It has already been mentioned that other committee members paid great attention to Maeterlinck's and Lavisse's candidacies."

On 11 November 1909 a large majority of the members of the Swedish Academy voted to award Lagerlöf the Nobel Prize in Literature as the first Swedish and first female recipient of the award.

== Reactions ==
The choice of Swedish writer Selma Lagerlöf as Nobel laureate in 1909 (for the "lofty idealism, vivid imagination and spiritual perception that characterizes her writings") followed fierce debate because of her writing style and subject matter, which broke literary decorums of the time. In the French newspaper Le Figaro the award to Lagerlöf was enthusiastically received. "All of her work", reporter Marc Hélys wrote, "bears the mark of her nobel soul; all of it, all the way to the shortest of her stories, all the way to the delicious volume composed for children: The Wonderful Adventures of Nils". The positive recognition was complemented by a short story by Lagerlöf published in the paper's Supplément littéraire the same day.

== Award ceremony ==
In his award ceremony speech on 10 December 1909, Claes Annerstedt of the Swedish Academy said:

"Geijer, Tegnér, or Runeberg, to mention only them, could justly have laid claim to the Nobel Prize, and the development which these great men have started has grown to fuller bloom. But among the writers of the younger generation who have contributed so much to our literature, there is one name that enjoys the special splendour of a star of the first magnitude. In the works of Selma Lagerlöf we seem to recognize the purest and best features of our Great Swedish Mother."

During Lagerlöf's acceptance speech, she remained humble and told a fantastic story of her father, as she 'visited him in heaven'. In the story, she asks her father for help with the debt she owes and her father explains the debt is from all the people who supported her throughout her career. Lagerlöf explains that she remembered her father the moment she received the prize, saying:

"But then I thought of my father and felt a deep sorrow that he should no longer be alive, and that I could not go to him and tell him that I had been awarded the Nobel Prize. I knew that no one would have been happier than he to hear this. Never have I met anyone with his love and respect for the written word and its creators, and I wished that he could have known that the Swedish Academy had bestowed on me this great Prize. Yes, it was a deep sorrow to me that I could not tell him."
