= Molly Elliot Seawell =

American historian and writer (1853–1916)

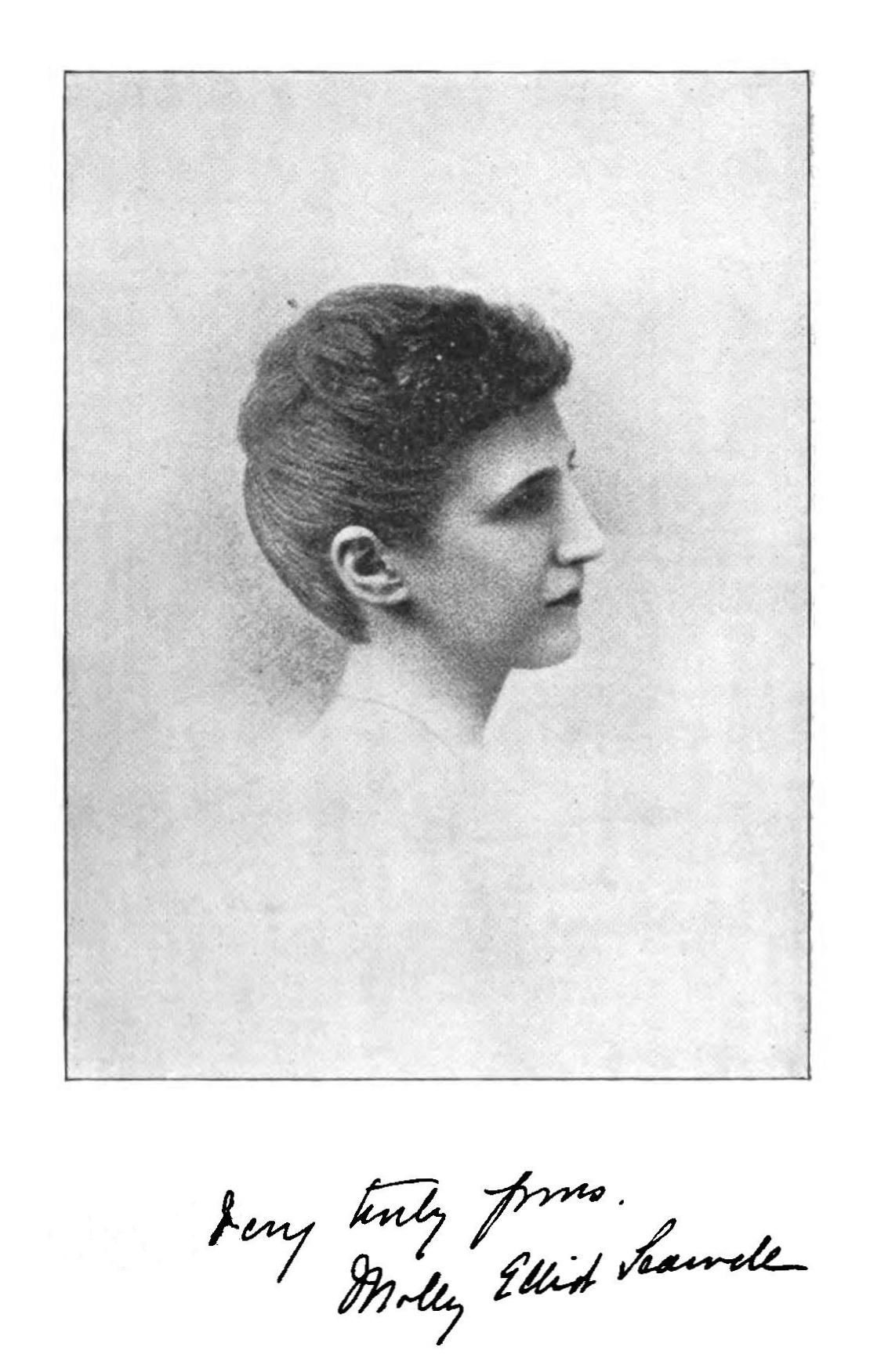
- Molly Elliot Seawell 1893
- Born: October 23, 1853; Gloucester, Virginia, U.S.
- Died: November 15, 1916 (aged 56); Washington, D.C., U.S.
- Resting place: Green Mount Cemetery
- Relatives: John Tyler (grand uncle)

Molly Elliot Seawell (October 23, 1853 – November 15, 1916), an early American historian and writer, was a descendant of the Seawells of Virginia and a grand niece of President John Tyler. Raised on a large plantation, her education included being "turned loose in a library of good books", her father's home containing the best literature of the 18th century. She read English classics, and was especially fond of poetry. She did not read a novel until after she was 17, and the first was Oliver Goldsmith's The Vicar of Wakefield. Her three amusements were reading, riding and piano-playing. Her father, a prominent lawyer, died just as Seawell reached adulthood.

Seawell sent some stories to Lippincott's Monthly Magazine when William S. Walsh was the editor. Recognizing Seawell's ability to be unusual, he encouraged her from the beginning. Her first stories were signed with a pen name till her friends persuaded her to sign her own name, which occurred after Maid Marian was published. This is considered her best story. She ventured into the genre of juvenile literature when she sent Little Jarvis to The Youth's Companion to contend for the US$500 prize.

It is possible that Seawell's essay "On the Absence of Creative Faculty in Women" attracted more attention than any of her books. Women answered it, and the discussion was joined by Andrew Lang, Thomas Wentworth Higginson, and others. The Critic stated that essay attracted more attention than any single article ever published in its columns. In style, Seawell was said to resemble Jane Austen. Seawell's works, besides numerous short stories, included: Young Heros of our Navy, Maid Marian and Other Stories, Midshipman Paulding, Hale Weston, Paul Jones, and The Midshipmen's Mess.

== Early life and education ==
Molly Elliot Seawell was born in Gloucester, Virginia, a member of one of the older European families to settle in Virginia. Her father, John Tyler Seawell, a lawyer and orator, was a nephew of President John Tyler. Her mother (Tyler's second wife), Frances Elizabeth Jackson Seawell, was a native of Baltimore whose father, Major William Jackson, a distinguished officer in the War of 1812, who was with the Cavalry division at the Battle of North Point, 12 September 1814.

Descendants of the original Seawells spell the family name in one of two forms: "Sewell" (as in Sewell's Point, Norfolk, Virginia) and "Seawell." Otis Notman interviewing Molly Elliot Seawell for The New York Times Saturday Review of Books noted that the regional pronunciation of the name was "Sowell," although Molly Elliot Seawell pronounced her name as it was spelled ("Talks", 392).

Seawell spent her early life at the family's plantation home, "The Shelter," which had been a hospital in the American Revolutionary War. She described her early formation as a "... secluded life ... in the library of an old Virginia country house, and in a community where conditions more nearly resembled the eighteenth than the nineteenth century" ("The Ladies' Battle", 116).

Her father was a student of the Classics, who influenced her learning. She was not allowed to read a novel until she was 17, instead reading history, encyclopedias, and the works of William Shakespeare and the Romantic poets. Her education was primarily informal at home, where she learned riding, dancing, and household management. In addition to these influences and her Tidewater surroundings, Seawell's seafaring uncle, Joseph Seawell, contributed to her future literary subjects.

== Life ==
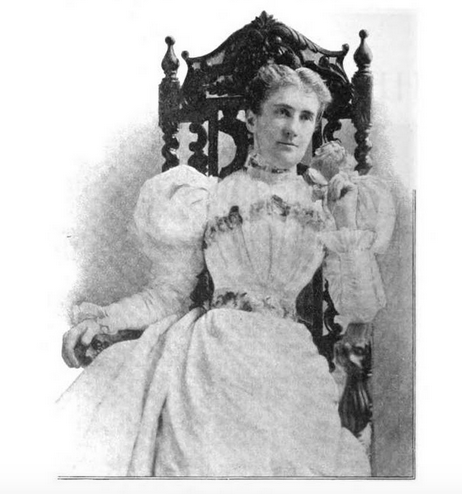
Molly Elliot Seawell (1898)

After her father's death and between her move to Norfolk and settling for life in Washington, D.C., Seawell made the first of many trips to Europe. Her visits took her to the United Kingdom of Great Britain and Ireland, France, Germany, and even as far as Imperial Russia. Apparently the appeal of Russia and Germany was the therapeutic waters of the baths, to which Seawell attributed the improvement of a chronic eye condition (Notman "Some Authors," "Talks"). Her summers in Europe, returning to Washington in October, became a regular event. These travels extended the material of her literary subjects which included the sea, England, France, and Central Europe.

The household Seawell sustained with her mother and her younger sister Henrietta on P Street near Washington's fashionable Du Pont Circle was the location of an artists' salon of sorts. She entertained artists and writers there in addition to such notables of the time as the Earl of Carlisle and his daughter, Lady Dorothy Howard (Notman "Some Authors," "Talks"). After the death of her mother and later of Henrietta, Seawell temporarily withdrew from social life, despite an enormous capacity for friendship and interest in people.

Seawell's health had been precarious for a number of years. She died of cancer in her home on November 15, 1916, only a few weeks after her 56th birthday. Her Roman Catholic Requiem Mass was held at the Church of St. Matthew (now the Cathedral of St. Matthew the Apostle). Her body was interred in Baltimore's Greenmount Cemetery.

== Writings ==
The death of her father when she was 20 (Notman "Talks" 392) prompted Molly Elliot Seawell, her mother and her younger sister, Henrietta, to move from "The Shelter" in Gloucester to Norfolk and later to Washington, D.C. It was either in Norfolk or in Washington that Seawell began her literary career in earnest.

She first wrote using pseudonyms (including the patrician-sounding "Foxcroft Davis" – the novels Mrs. Darrell and The Whirl – and the Russian "Vera Sapoukhyn") until the publication of her short story Maid Marian in 1886, a tale she later dramatized for actress Rosina Vokes. Her first novel, Hale-Weston, published in 1889, was widely read and translated into German. These successes established her literary career; in her own words:

That I succeeded was due to tireless effort, unbroken health, a number of fortunate circumstances, and above all, what I am neither afraid nor ashamed to say, the kindness of the good God. In the course of time, I became, through literature alone, a householder, a property-owner, a taxpayer, and the regular employer of five persons. (The Ladies' Battle 116)

In 1890, Seawell received a prize for a short story. Five years later, she received a $3000 prize from the New York Herald for a story.

Her literary production included forty books of fiction, collected short fiction, non-fiction, and numerous political columns from Washington for New York dailies and essays. Among her political essays was a 1910 article for The Atlantic Monthly opposing women's suffrage, in which she also spoke ill of the extension of the franchise to African Americans after the Civil War.

For her short stories and historical works, she was nominated for the Nobel Prize in Literature by American professor Charles W. Kent in 1910 and 1911.

== Style ==
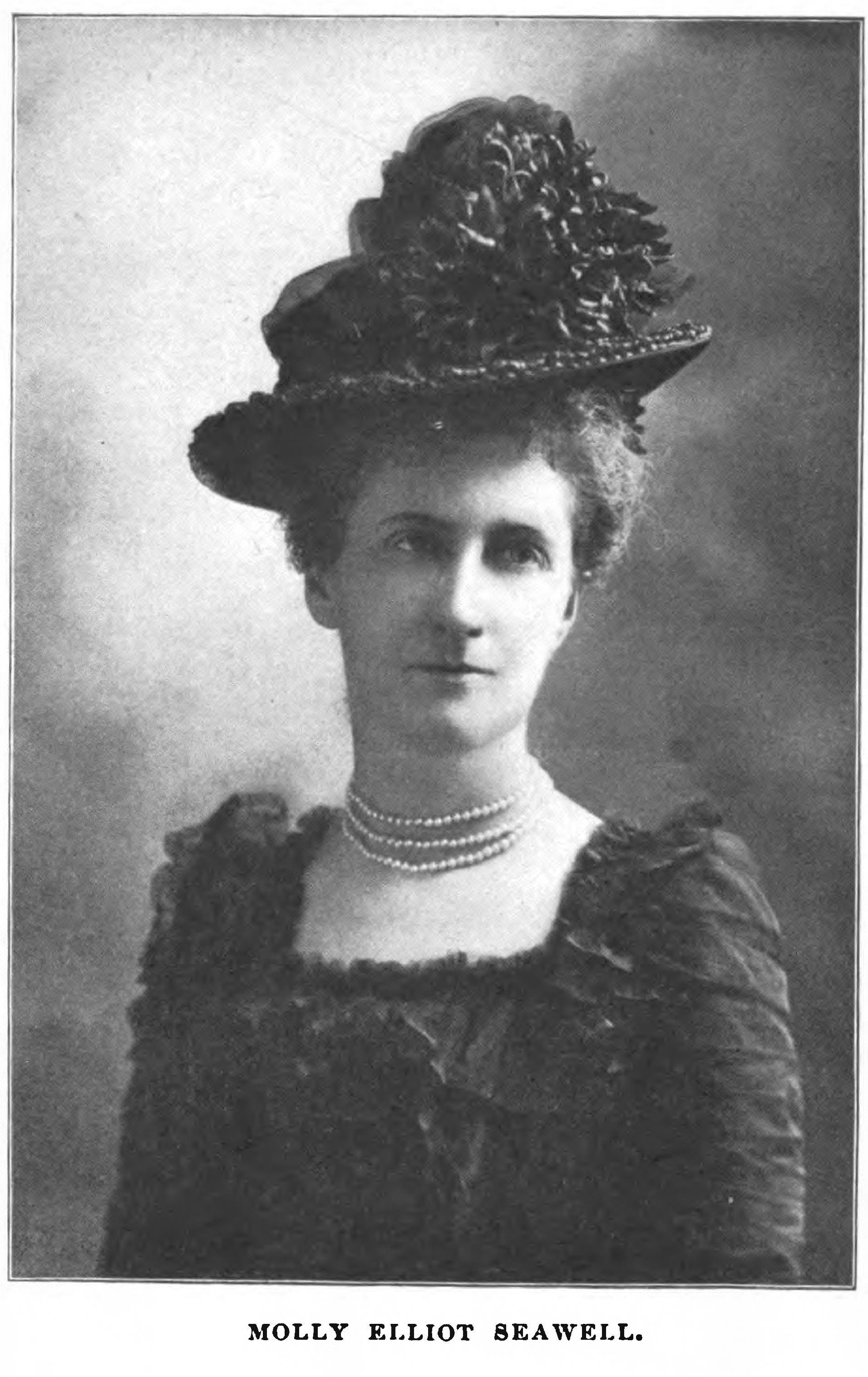
Molly Elliot Seawell 1902

Seawell's fiction might be distinguished into three genres: regional fiction, romances, and books for boys (primarily nautical stories). Their strong suit is Seawell's ability in characterization rather than her plots. In an interview with her, Notman observed this strength ("Talks" 392), to which she replied: "My people usually seem flesh and blood to me. If they do not have the breath of life in them at the beginning, no amount of labor can make them real." Mitchell in American Women Writers remarks more critically, "Plot was never her strong point, and the perfect ladies and gentlemen, the overt racism, and the condescending tone are interesting only because they reflect values once widespread" (41).

Seawell was widely read in her time and, at the beginning of the 20th century, was included in standard reference works on American writers and among the Times's Otis Notman's interviews with William Dean Howells, Jack London, and Theodore Dreiser.

== Works ==
- Throckmorton; A Novel (1890)
- Midshipman Paulding (New York, 1891)
- Paul Jones (1892)
- Decatur and Somers (1893)
- The Berkeleys and their Neighbors (1894)
- A Strange, Sad Comedy (1895)
- The Sprightly Romance of Marsac (1896)
- The History of Lady Betty Stair's Suitors (1897)
- A Virginian Cavalier (1898)
- The Rock of the Lion (1898)
- The Loves of the Lady Arabella (1899)
- The Fortunes of Fifi (1903) --(*made into a 1917 film The Fortunes of Fifi)
- Mrs. Darrell (1905)
- The Victory (1906)
- The Whirl: A Romance of Washington Society (1909)
- The Ladies' Battle (1910)
- Betty's Virginia Christmas (1914)
