= Sechs Lieder =

Sechs Lieder may refer to:

- Sechs Lieder, Op. 59 (Mendelssohn)
- Sechs Lieder, Op. 4, a set of six Lieder for medium voice and piano by Max Reger
- Sechs Lieder, Op. 35, a set of six Lieder for medium voice and piano by Max Reger
- Sechs Lieder, Op. 68 (Strauss)
- Sechs Leider, Op. 3, a composition by Arnold Schoenberg
