= Johannes Warneck =

German Protestant missionary

The Right Reverend Johannes Warneck Ephorus
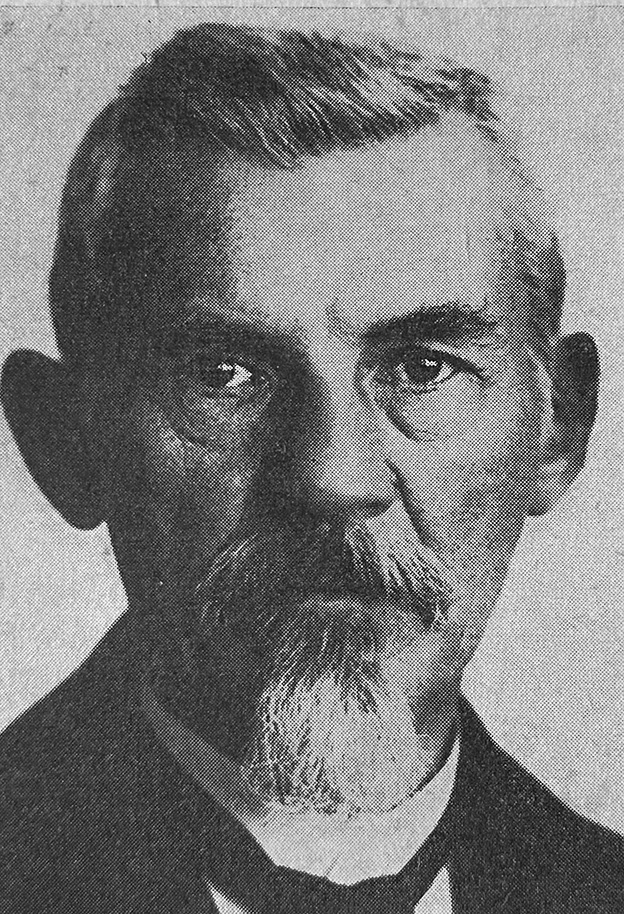
- Church: Huria Kristen Batak Protestan (HKBP)
- Installed: 1920
- Term ended: 1932
- Predecessor: Valentin Kessel
- Successor: P. Landgrebe

Personal details
- Born: 4 March 1867 Dommitzsch, Saxony, Germany
- Died: 1 September 1944 (aged 77) Bad Salzuflen, Lippe, North Rhine-Westphalia, Germany
- Parents: Gustav Warneck (father); Henriette Gerlach (mother)
- Spouse: Gertrud Winkler (m. 1893–1909); Hanna Quistorp (m. 1925–1944)
- Children: 5

Johannes Warneck (1867–1944) was a German Protestant missionary sent by the Rhenish Mission Society (RMG) to work among the Batak people in Sumatra, Dutch East Indies (present-day: Indonesia). He made significant contributions to the study of the religion of the Batak people, where he lived in Sumatra from 1892 to 1906 and from 1920 to 1930.

== Early life and education ==
Johannes Warneck was born on 4 March 1867 in Dommitzsch, Saxony, Germany. His father Gustav Warneck was a German Protestant theologian and founder of German Protestant Missions Committee. His mother, Henriette Gerlach, managed the parsonage household and raising their nine children (five of whom survived to adulthood, including missionary Johannes Warneck and publisher Martin Warneck). In his youth, he devoted himself to watercolor painting in Rothenschirmbach, where he spent most of his youth. One of his paintings is titled Das Pfarrhaus in Rothenschirmbach and shows his parents' house and the stable buildings in the parsonage garden, with the church tower of the old church in the background. Another watercolor, captioned in Die alte Kirche in Rothenschirmbach, depicts the church with part of the cemetery.

From Easter 1880, Johannes attended the Gymnasium in Nordhausen with his brother Martin Warneck. He studied theology in Leipzig, Greifswald and Halle and was active in the Wingolf fraternity at all three places of study. In Halle, he was influenced by the systematic theologian Martin Kähler to become a missionary.

== Ministry in Sumatra ==
From 1892 to 1906, he served as a missionary among the Batak people in Sumatra, where he focused primarily on the training and further education of local teachers and preachers. In 1908, he became mission inspector in Barmen, and in 1912, the first lecturer in mission at Bethel near Bielefeld. In 1920, he assumed the office of Ephorus of the Batak Christian Protestant Church (Huria Kristen Batak Protestan or HKBP) in Sumatra which became independent in 1930.

From 1932 he was director of the Rhenish Missionary Society in Barmen until he retired in 1937. He died at the age of 77 on 1 September 1944.

== Family ==
Johannes Warneck was married twice. His first marriage with Gertrud Winkler was from 21 December 1893 until her death on 1909. His second marriage with Hanna Quistorp was from 1925 until his death on 1 September 1944.

== Works and editions ==
- Weltkrieg und Weltmission (World war and world mission), published by Drud un Berlag von C. Bertelsmann, Berlin in 1891; Godesberg in 1915.
- Ein Tag auf Sumatra. Bilder aus dem Alltagsleben eines Missionars. Don Johannes Warneck (A Day in Sumatra. Pictures from the everyday life of a missionary. By Johannes Warneck), compiled in the Aus Höhen und Tiefen: e. Jahrbuch für d. dt. Haus (Ups and Downs: A Yearbook for the German Home), pages: 325–346, published by Martin Warneck Publishing House in 1898.
- Studien Üeber die Literatur der Tobabatak (Study on the Literature of the Toba Batak), compiled in the Mittheilungen des Seminars für Orientalische Sprachen an der Königlichen Friedrich Wilhelms-Universität zu Berlin (Communications of the Seminar for Oriental Languages at the Friedrich-Wilhelms-University in Berlin), published in 1899.
- Djamita kuria. Ponggol 1 (Church Sermon, part 1), published by American Mission Press, Singapore, in 1901.
- Umpama Batak (Batak Poverb) in 1902.
- Die Erziehung der Gehilfen in der Batak-Mission (The education of the assistants in the Batak mission), in: Allgemeine Missionszeitschrift No. 29, 1902, pp. 305–318 and 353–363.
- Der bataksche Ahnen- und Geisterkult (The Batak ancestor and spirit cult), in: Allgemeine Missionszeitschrift No. 31, 1904, pp. 3–14 and 63–79.
- Die Christianisierung der batakschen Sprache : Eine missions-linguistische Studie (The Christianization of the Batak language: A missionary linguistic study), published by Martin Warneck in 1904.
- Ilmu Bumi Asia (Earth Sciences of Asia), published in 1905.
- Tobabataksch-Deutsches Wörterbuch (Batak Toba–German Dictionary), published by Rheinischen Missions-Gesellschaft in 1905; Landsdrukkerij, Batavia in 1906; and The Hague in 1977.
  - Toba-Bataks-Nederlands woordenboek (Batak Toba-Dutch Dictionary) published by J. van de Veerdonk & Zoon in 1947.
- Die Lebenskräfte des Evangeliums: Missionserfahrungen innerhalb des animistischen Heidentums (The Vital Forces of the Gospel: Missionary Experiences within Animistic Paganism), published by Martin Warneck Publishing House, Berlin 1908, 1911, 1913, 1922 and 1986; Kessinger Publishing, 2010, ISBN 978-1-160-86767-2.
  - The Living Christ and Dying Heathenism: The Experiences of a Missionary in Animistic Heathendom, published by Flemming H. Revel Company in 1909; Baker, Grand Rapids in 1954.
- Unsere batakschen Gehilfen, Auf Missionspfaden (Our Batak helpers, On missionary paths). Accounts from the work of the Rhenish Mission, 4, Gütersloh 1908.
- The Gospel and Animism, by Rev. Johannes Warneck, compiled in the Church Missionary Intelligencer and Record, pages: 265–270, published by Church Missionary Society in 1909.
- Die Religion der Batak. Ein Paradigma für die animistischen Religionen des Indischen Archipels (The Religion of the Batak. A Paradigm for the Animistic Religions of the Indian Archipelago), published by Vandenhoeck & Ruprecht; J.C. Hinrichs in 1909.
- D. Gustav Warneck: 1834–1910; Blätter der Erinnerung (Pages of Remembrance), Berlin 1911.
- 50 Jahre Batakmission in Sumatra (50 Years Batakmission in Sumatra), published in 1911.
- Das Problem der Missions-Kirche (The Problem of the Missionary Church), published by Bethel bei Bielefeld : Eisenacher Bund in 1912.
- Paulus im Lichte der heutigen Heidenmission (Paul in the Light of Contemporary Mission to the Gentiles), published by Martin Warneck Publishing House, Berlin in 1913, 1914 and 1922.
  - Paulus im Lichte der heutigen Heidenmission und weitere Schriften: Gesammelte Schriften (Johannes Warneck: Collected Writings Volume I: Paul in the Light of Today's Mission to the Gentiles).
- Menschenmacht und Gotteskraft: Kriegserfahrungen der deutschen Mission (Human Powerlessness and God's Power: War Experiences of the German Mission), published by Martin Warneck in 1916.
- Von Tieren und Pflanzen in Sumatra (Animals and Plants in Sumatra), published by Missionshaus in 1917.
- D. Ludwig J. Nommensen, ein Lebensbild, published by Verlag des Rheinischen Missionshauses in 1919.
- Die Erfahrungen der Mission und die kirchliche Neuordnung : [Kopftitel.] (The experiences of the mission and the ecclesiastical reorganization: [Heading title.]), published by Buchh. d. Evang. Gesellschaft für Deutschland in 1919.
- Von Heiden und Christen in Sumatra : Der Jugend erzählt (Of Pagans and Christians in Sumatra: Told for Young People), published by Verlag des Missionshauses in 1922.
- Sechzig Jahre Batakmission in Sumatra (Sixty Years of the Batak Mission in Sumatra), published by Martin Warneck Publishing House, 3rd Edition, Berlin in 1925.
- Schreiben von Johannes Warneck an die Batakgemeinden (Letters from Johannes Warneck to the Batak Congregations), in 1927.
- Die Volkskirchen auf Sumatra und Nias (The People's Churches of Sumatra and Nias), published by C. Bertelsmann in 1927.
- Madju: Ein Gang durch die Batakmission (Forward: A Journey Through the Batak Mission), published by Missionhaus in 1928.
- Mission und Kirche (Mission and Church), published by Verlag Missionshauses in 1934.
- Die inseln harren auf mich (The islands await me), published by Rheinische Missionsgesellschaft in 1936.
- Werfet eure Netze aus. Erinnerungen (Cast out your nets. Memoirs), published by Martin Warneck, Berlin 1938.
  - The excerpt Ausreise ins Batakland (Departure to Batakland) was published with a short biography in: Von Grönland bis Lambarene, Reisebeschreibungen christlicher Missionare aus drei Jahrhunderten edited by Johannes Paul. Published by Evangelische Verlagsanstalt Berlin in 1952 (pages 129–141) and Kreuz-Verlag Stuttgart in 1958 (pages 127–139).
- Sumatranische Plaudereien (Sumatran Chants), published by Martin Warneck Publishing House, Berlin, in 1939.
- Das Wort läuft durch die Lande. Johannes Warneck (The word is spreading throughout the land. Johannes Warneck), published by MBK-Verlag, in Bad Salzuflen in 1939 and 1946.
- Das Wunder der Gemeinde Jesu in dieser Welt (The Miracle of the Church of Jesus in This World) published by Rheinischen Missionsgesellschaft in 1947.
- Eduard Fries: Das leben eines deutschen missionars (Eduard Fries: The Life of a German Missionary), published by Rheinischen Missionsgesellschaft in 1949.
