= The Fortunes of Fifi =

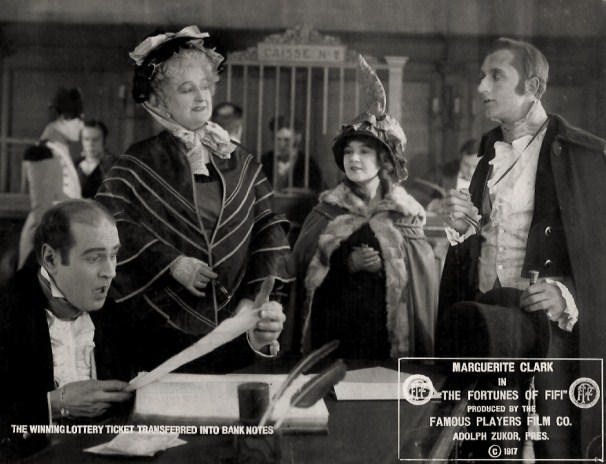
- still of scene
- Directed by: Robert G. Vignola
- Written by: Eve Unsell (scenario)
- Based on: The Fortunes of Fifi by Molly Elliot Seawell
- Starring: Marguerite Clark
- Cinematography: William Marshall
- Production company: Famous Players Film Company
- Distributed by: Paramount Pictures
- Release date: February 26, 1917
- Running time: 5 reels
- Country: United States
- Language: Silent (English intertitles)

The Fortunes of Fifi is a 1917 American silent historical romance film directed by Robert G. Vignola and starring Marguerite Clark. Based on the novel of the same name by Molly Elliot Seawell, the film is set in France and takes place during the era of Napoleon Bonaparte. The film is now presumed lost.

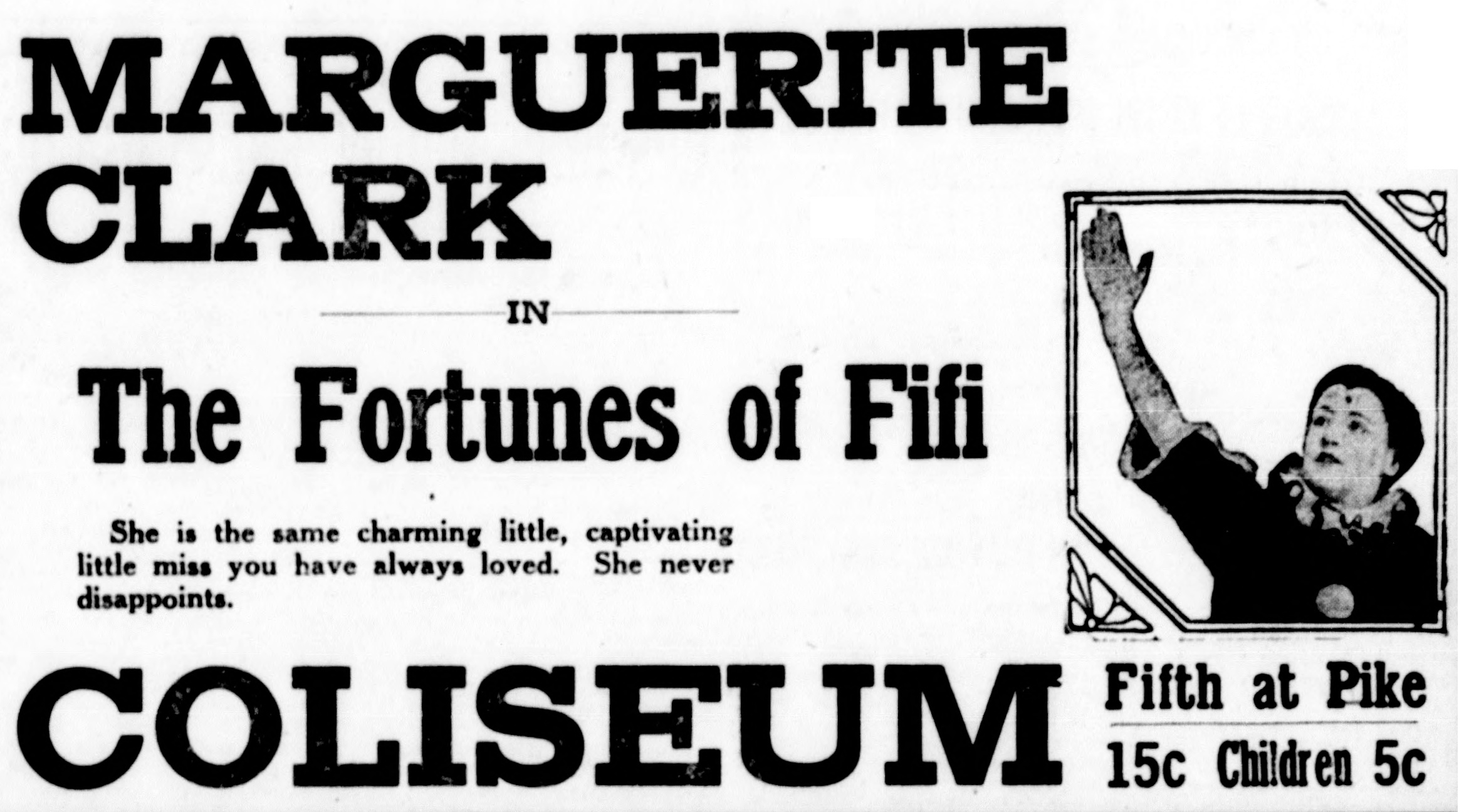
Newspaper advertisement, 1917

== Cast ==
- Marguerite Clark – Fifi
- William Sorelle – Cartouche
- John Sainpolis – Duvernet
- Yvonne Chevalier – Julie
- Kate Lester – Madame Bourcet
- Jean Gauthier – Louis Bourcet
- J. K. Murray – The General
