= Erna Schorlemmer =

German composer

Erna Schorlemmer Loebell
- Born: 30 June 1875; Dessau
- Died: 1945 (aged 69–70)
- Other names: Erna Schorlemmer, Erny Chaloix
- Occupation: composer
- Known for: ballet music, marches, music for piano, and songs
- Parents: Leopold von Schorlemmer (father); Mathilde Hippolyta von Petersdorff (mother)
- Awards: member, ASCAP

Erna Schorlemmer Loebell (30 June 1875 – 1945) was a German composer who published ballet music, marches, music for piano, and songs under the name Erna Schorlemmer and the pseudonym Erny Chaloix.

Schorlemmer was born in Dessau to Mathilde Hippolyta von Petersdorff and Leopold von Schorlemmer. Her teachers included Eduard Behm, Henry or Magda von Dulong, Otto Lessman, and Luria (probably Arthur-Vincent Lourié). She married Paul von Loebell, and by 1914 was teaching voice at a music school in Berlin.

Schorlemmer was a member of the American Society of Composers, Authors and Publishers (ASCAP). Her music was published by Otto Wrede and included:

== Ballet ==
- works

== Orchestra ==
- Intermezzo

== Piano ==
- works

== Vocal ==
- SCHWARZE DER BEN intermezzo (text by Hermann Frey/Martin Greif; music by Erny Chaloix)
- VERGESSEN valse boston (text by Hermann Frey/Martin Greif; music by Erny Chaloix)
