= Heart's Desire (1917 film) =

- Directed by: Francis J. Grandon
- Screenplay by: Shannon Fife; Eve Unsell
- Starring: Marie Doro; Alan Roscoe; Mario Majeroni; Jean Del Val; Helen Dahl; Harry Lee
- Cinematography: Larry Williams
- Production company: Famous Players Film Company
- Distributed by: Paramount Pictures
- Release date: April 30, 1917
- Running time: 50 minutes
- Country: United States
- Languages: Silent; English intertitles

Heart's Desire is a 1917 American silent drama film directed by Francis J. Grandon and written by Shannon Fife and Eve Unsell. The film stars Marie Doro, Alan Roscoe, Mario Majeroni, Jean Del Val, Helen Dahl and Harry Lee. The film was released on April 30, 1917, by Paramount Pictures.

== Cast ==
- Marie Doro as Fleurette
- Alan Roscoe as Paul Le Roque
- Mario Majeroni as Henri Le Roque
- Jean Del Val as Jacques
- Helen Dahl as Helen St. Simon
- Harry Lee as Le Roque's Secretary
- Gertrude Norman as Mother Mathilde
- Ida Darling
- Eddie Sturgis

== Preservation status ==
The film survives and is preserved in the Library of Congress collection. It is entered in their database twice.
