= Jean Del Val =

French actor (1891–1975)

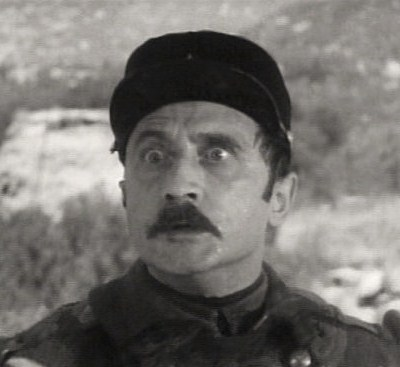
- Del Val in The Flying Deuces (1939)
- Born: Jean Jacques Gauthier; 17 November 1891; Reims, Grand Est, France
- Died: 13 March 1975 (aged 83); Pacific Palisades, California, U.S.
- Other names: Jean Gauthier; Jean Gautier
- Occupation: Actor
- Years active: 1917—1973

Jean Jacques Gauthier (17 November 1891 – 13 March 1975), known by the stage name Jean Del Val, was a French actor, long based in the United States.

== Life and career ==
Born Jean Jacques Gauthier in Reims, Del Val moved to Los Angeles in the 1910s. He played roles during the Hollywood silent era, beginning with The Fortunes of Fifi in 1917. During the early days of talkies he served as a translator and vocal coach for French language versions of American-made films, as well as a dubber.

Two of his notable credits include the classic 1942 film Casablanca in a small role as an announcer for a French radio station in one of the opening scenes, and historical figure Ferdinand Foch in the 1941 film Sergeant York, based on the life of Alvin York. His most well-known role was comatose scientist Dr. Jan Benes in the 1966 science fiction film Fantastic Voyage.

He also appeared on 5 episodes of the television series Combat!: first, uncredited in the episode "A Day in June", followed by "No Trumpets, No Drums" as Marceau, then as a French farmer in "Birthday Cake", Father Bomar in "The Steeple", and Brother Edmundo in "The Mockingbird".

Del Val's Broadway stage credits included the Cole Porter musical Fifty Million Frenchmen, Lulu Belle, and Oscar Wilde.

== Death ==
Del Val died at age 83 from a heart attack in Pacific Palisades, California. He is interred in the Holy Cross Cemetery, Culver City.

== Selected filmography ==
- The Fortunes of Fifi (1917) – Louis Bourcet
- Heart's Desire (1917) – Jacques
- Atonement (1919) – Tony
- The Mystery of the Yellow Room (1919) – Jean Sainclair
- A Sainted Devil (1924) – Casimiro
- A Man of Iron (1925) – Prince Novakian
- Fifty-Fifty (1925) – Jean
- Back to Liberty (1927) – Rudolph Gambier
- Soyons gais (1930)
- The Sap from Syracuse (1930) – Pierre Bouvet – French Engineer (uncredited)
- Sea Legs (1930) – Crosseti
- Women Men Marry (1931) – Pierre Renault
- The Magnificent Lie (1931) – Stage Manager
- Friends and Lovers (1931) – Marquis Henri de Pézanne
- Possessed (1931) – Waiter (uncredited)
- The Passionate Plumber (1932) – Chauffeur
- Quand on est belle (1932) – Gensler
- L'Athlète incomplet (1932) – Coach
- Rasputin and the Empress (1932) – Minor Role (uncredited)
- Le plombier amoureux (1932)
- Gabriel Over the White House (1933) – Representative at Debt Conference (uncredited)
- The Man Who Broke the Bank at Monte Carlo (1935) – Cook (uncredited)
- The Phantom Gondola (1936) – Monsieur de Montignac
- Block-Heads (1938) – French aviator (uncredited)
- Pack Up Your Troubles (1939) – Capt. Armande (uncredited)
- The Flying Deuces (1939) – Sergeant
- Charlie Chan in City in Darkness (1939) – French Cabby (uncredited)
- Everything Happens at Night (1939) – Gendarme Catching Thief (uncredited)
- The Man Who Wouldn't Talk (1940) – Jacques (uncredited)
- Broadway Melody of 1940 (1940) – Italian Waiter (uncredited)
- The House Across the Bay (1940) – French Official (uncredited)
- I Was an Adventuress (1940) – Detective (uncredited)
- Earthbound (1940) – Train Dispatcher (uncredited)
- Brother Orchid (1940) – Frenchman (uncredited)
- Mystery Sea Raider (1940) – Captain Benoit
- Captain Caution (1940) – French Officer (uncredited)
- Triple Justice (1940) – Don Solas (uncredited)
- Drums of the Desert (1940) – Colonel Fouchet
- Down Argentine Way (1940) – Señor Rufino (uncredited)
- Arise, My Love (1940) – Conductor (uncredited)
- The Mark of Zorro (1940) – Sentry (uncredited)
- Hudson's Bay (1941) – Captain (uncredited)
- Rage in Heaven (1941) – Porter at Sanatarium (uncredited)
- That Night in Rio (1941) – Stock Exchange Clerk (uncredited)
- Hello, Sucker (1941) – Headwaiter (uncredited)
- Sergeant York (1941) – Marshal Ferdinand Foch (uncredited)
- Outlaws of the Desert (1941) – Faran El Kader
- Paris Calling (1941) – Peasant (uncredited)
- The Lady Has Plans (1942) – Bartender (uncredited)
- Secret Agent of Japan (1942) – Solaire
- Take a Letter, Darling (1942) – Headwaiter (uncredited)
- The Pied Piper (1942) – Railroad official
- Crossroads (1942) – Court Clerk (uncredited)
- Just Off Broadway (1942) – Henri – Waiter (uncredited)
- Dr. Renault's Secret (1942) – Henri (uncredited)
- Gentleman Jim (1942) – Renaud (uncredited)
- Casablanca (1942) – Police Officer (uncredited)
- Reunion in France (1942) – Porter (uncredited)
- Mission to Moscow (1943) – Molotov's Secretary (uncredited)
- Action in the North Atlantic (1943) – Capt. La Pricor (uncredited)
- Background to Danger (1943) – Clerk (uncredited)
- For Whom the Bell Tolls (1943) – The Sniper
- Adventures of the Flying Cadets (1943, Serial) – Michaud – Nazi Agent M-7 [Ch. 13] (uncredited)
- Wintertime (1943) – Constable (uncredited)
- Paris After Dark (1943) – Papa Benoit (uncredited)
- The Song of Bernadette (1943) – Estrade (uncredited)
- Passage to Marseille (1944) – Raoul Doulaine (uncredited)
- Tampico (1944) – Port Pilot (uncredited)
- Uncertain Glory (1944) – Prison Turnkey (uncredited)
- Irish Eyes Are Smiling (1944) – Waiter (uncredited)
- Molly and Me (1945) – Pierre Petard – Cook (uncredited)
- Cornered (1945) – M. Trabeau, First Prefect (uncredited)
- The Spider (1945) – Henri Dutrelle, Hotel Manager
- 13 Rue Madeleine (1946) – French Peasant with Wood (uncredited)
- Gilda (1946) – French Cartel Member (uncredited)
- O.S.S. (1946) – Conductor (uncredited)
- Monsieur Beaucaire (1946) – Minister of War (uncredited)
- So Dark the Night (1946) – Dr. Manet
- The Razor's Edge (1946) – Police Clerk (uncredited)
- The Return of Monte Cristo (1946) – Pinot (uncredited)
- Undercover Maisie (1947) – Headwaiter (uncredited)
- Buck Privates Come Home (1947) – Duprez – French Consul General (uncredited)
- The Private Affairs of Bel Ami (1947) – Commissioner
- Repeat Performance (1947) – Tony – Waiter (uncredited)
- Life with Father (1947) – François – Headwaiter at Delmonico's (uncredited)
- Down to Earth (1947) – Croupier (uncredited)
- The Foxes of Harrow (1947) – Dr. Le Fevre (uncredited)
- The Crime Doctor's Gamble (1947) – Theodore – Butler
- I Walk Alone (1947) – Henri the Chef (uncredited)
- Julia Misbehaves (1948) – Croupier (uncredited)
- Siren of Atlantis (1949) – Minor Role (uncredited)
- The Fighting O'Flynn (1949) – French Admiral (uncredited)
- The Great Sinner (1949) – Croupier (uncredited)
- The Secret of St. Ives (1949) – Count St. Ives
- Battleground (1949) – French Peasant Man (uncredited)
- Under My Skin (1950) – Minor Role (uncredited)
- Last of the Buccaneers (1950) – Sauvinct (uncredited)
- Rich, Young and Pretty (1951) – Headwaiter (uncredited)
- Hurricane Island (1951) – Tavern Patron (uncredited)
- The Law and the Lady (1951) – Chemin de fer Dealer (uncredited)
- Lovely to Look At (1952) – Creditor (uncredited)
- Park Row (1952) – Mr. Dessard (uncredited)
- The Iron Mistress (1952) – St. Sylvain (uncredited)
- The Hitch-Hiker (1953) – Inspector General
- The 49th Man (1953) – Agent Maurice Leroux
- Gentlemen Prefer Blondes (1953) – Ship's Captain (uncredited)
- Little Boy Lost (1953) – Dr. Biroux (uncredited)
- Living It Up (1954) – French Chef (uncredited)
- The Gambler from Natchez (1954) – Dr. Ratan, Duel Official (uncredited)
- The Last Time I Saw Paris (1954) – Doctor (uncredited)
- Pirates of Tripoli (1955) – Abu Tala
- Moonfleet (1955) – French Captain (uncredited)
- Duel on the Mississippi (1955) – Bidault
- Anything Goes (1956) – French Luggage Man (uncredited)
- Funny Face (1957) – Hairdresser
- Silk Stockings (1957) – Elderly Waiter (uncredited)
- The Sad Sack (1957) – French General (uncredited)
- Me and the Colonel (1958) – Old Gentleman (uncredited)
- The Wreck of the Mary Deare (1959) – Javot (uncredited)
- Can-Can (1960) – Judge Merceaux
- Seven Thieves (1960) – Roulette Croupier (uncredited)
- The Devil at 4 O'Clock (1961) – Louis (uncredited)
- Take Her, She's Mine (1963) – Concierge (uncredited)
- Bedtime Story (1964) – Croupier (uncredited)
- Sylvia (1965) – Maitre'd (uncredited)
- The Art of Love (1965) – Magistrate (uncredited)
- Fantastic Voyage (1966) – Jan Benes
- Wait Until Dark (1967) – The Old Man (uncredited)
- Darling Lili (1970) – Maitre D' (uncredited)
- Roll Out (1973) as Priest (Members of the Wedding)

== Partial stage credits ==
Year	Title	Role	Venue	Notes	Ref.
1923–24	The Dancers	Gustave / Stage Manager	Broadhurst Theatre, New York City		
1926–27	Lulu Belle	Vicompte De Villars	Belasco Theatre, New York City		
1928–29	A Play Without a Name	Theodore	Booth Theatre, New York City		
1929–30	Fifty Million Frenchmen	Le Sahib Roussin / Joe Zelli	Lyric Theatre, New York City		
1937	His Excellency	Achille Lebas	The Playhouse, Wilmington		
1937	His Excellency	Achille Lebas	Belasco Theatre, Washington D.C.		
1938	Empress of Destiny	Segur	St. James Theatre, New York City		
1938–39	Oscar Wilde	Jules	Fulton Theatre, New York City		
