= Alfred Nicolas Rambaud =

French historian (1842–1905)

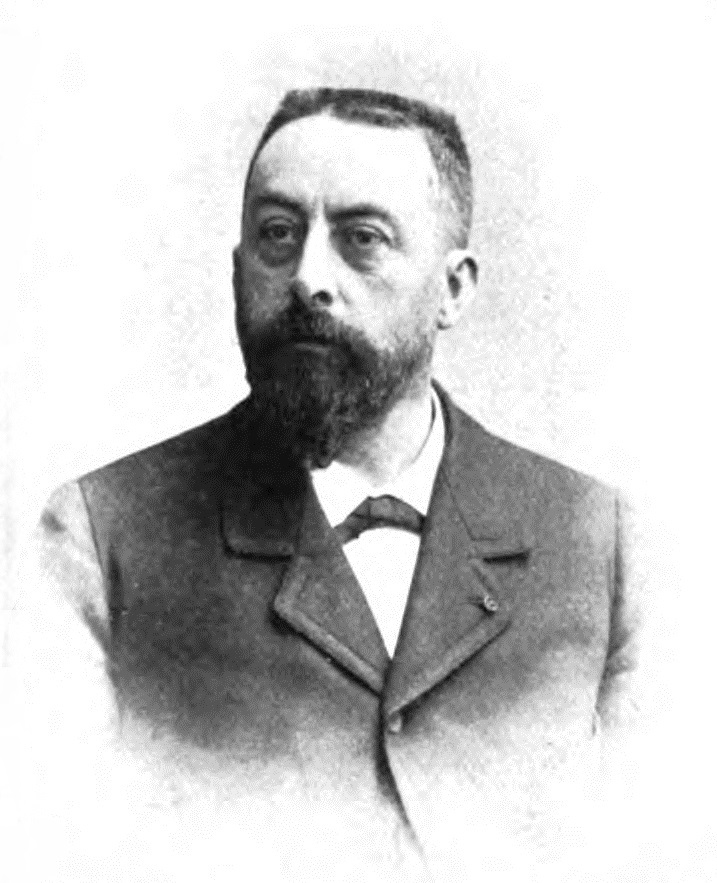
Alfred Nicolas Rambaud

Alfred Nicolas Rambaud (French pronunciation: [alfʁɛd nikɔla ʁɑ̃bo]; 2 July 1842 – 10 November 1905) was a French historian.

== Life ==
Alfred Nicolas Rambaud was born in Besançon. After studying at the École Normale Supérieure, he completed his studies in Germany. He was one of that band of young scholars, among whom were also Ernest Lavisse, Gabriel Monod and Gaston Paris, whose enthusiasm was aroused by the principles and organization of scientific study as applied beyond the Rhine, and who were ready to devote themselves to their cherished plan of remodelling higher education in France. He was appointed répétiteur at the École des Hautes Études on its foundation in 1868.

His researches were at that time directed towards the Byzantine period of the Middle Ages, and to this period were devoted the two theses which he composed for his doctorate in letters, De byzantino hippodromo et circensibus factionibus (revised in French for the Revue des deux mondes, under the title of Le monde byzantin; le sport et l'hippodrome, 1871), and L'Empire grec au Xe siècle, Constantin Porphyrognete (1870).

This latter work is still accepted as a good authority, and caused Rambaud to be hailed as a master on the Byzantine period; but with the exception of one article on Digenis Acritas, in the Revue des deux mondes (1875), and one other on Michael Psellus, in the Revue Historique (vol. iii., 1876), Rambaud's researches were diverted towards other parts of the East: The Franco-Prussian War inspired him with the idea for some courses of lectures which developed into books: La domination française en Allemagne; les Français sur le Rhin, 1792–1804 (1873) and L'Allemagne sous Napoleon I. 1804–1811 (1874). He watched attentively the role played by Russia, and soon observed how much to the interest of France, a good entente with this power would be.

He accordingly threw himself into the study of Russian history, staying in Russia in order to learn its language, institutions and customs. In 1874 he took part in the 3rd Archeological Congress that was held in Kiev, and wrote a report on it for the "Revue des Deux Mondes". On his return, he published La Russie épique, a study of the dumas, Ukrainian epic songs (1876), a short but excellent Histoire de la Russie depuis les origines jusqu'à l'année 1877 (1878; 5th ed., 1900), Français et Russes, Moscou et Sévastopol 1812–1854 (1876; 2nd ed., 1881), and finally the two important volumes on Russian diplomatic history in the Recueil des Instructions données aux ambassadeurs (vols. vii. and ix., 1890 and 1891). He was not improbably moved by considerations of foreign policy to publish his Russes et Prussiens, guerre de Sept Ans (1895), a popular work, though based on solid research. After teaching history in the Faculties of Arts at Caen (1871) and Nancy (1873), he was called to the Sorbonne (1883), where he was the first to occupy the chair of contemporary history.

By this time he had already entered into politics; he had been chef du cabinet of Jules Ferry (1879–1881), though this did not distract him from his literary work. It was under these conditions that he composed his Histoire de la civilisation française (2 vols., 1885, 1887; 9th ed., 1901) and his Histoire de la civilisation contemporaine en France (1888; new ed. entirely revised, 1906), and undertook the general editorship of the Histoire générale du IVe siècle jusqu'à nos jours. The plan of this great work had been drawn up with the aid of Ernest Lavisse, but the entire supervision of its execution was carried out by Rambaud. He contributed to it himself some interesting chapters on the history of the East, of which he had a thorough knowledge. In 1885 Rambaud published, in collaboration with J. B. Baille, a French translation of J.R. Seeley's Expansion of England, and in the preface he laid great emphasis on the enormous increase of power brought to England by the possession of her colonies, seeing in this a lesson for France.

He was anxious to see the rise of a Greater France, on the model of Greater Britain, and it was with this idea that he undertook to present to the public a series of essays written by famous explorers or political men, under the title of La France coloniale, histoire, geographie, commerce (1886; 6th ed., 1893).

Having become senator for the département of Doubs (1895–1902), Rambaud held the position of minister of Public Instruction from 29 April 1896 to 28 June 1898, and in that capacity endeavoured to carry on the educational work of Jules Ferry, to whose memory he always remained faithful. He dedicated to his former chief a book (Jules Ferry, 1903), which is a valuable testimony to the efforts made by France to organize public education and found a colonial empire; but this fidelity also won him some enemies, who succeeded for some time in preventing him from becoming a member of the Institute. He was finally elected a member of the Académie des Sciences morales et politiques on 11 December 1897 in place of the duc d'Aumale, of whose life he wrote an account (vol. xxii., 2nd series, of the Mémoires of this academy). His many interests ended by wearing out even his robust constitution, and he died at Paris in 1905.
