= Édouard Rod =

French-Swiss novelist

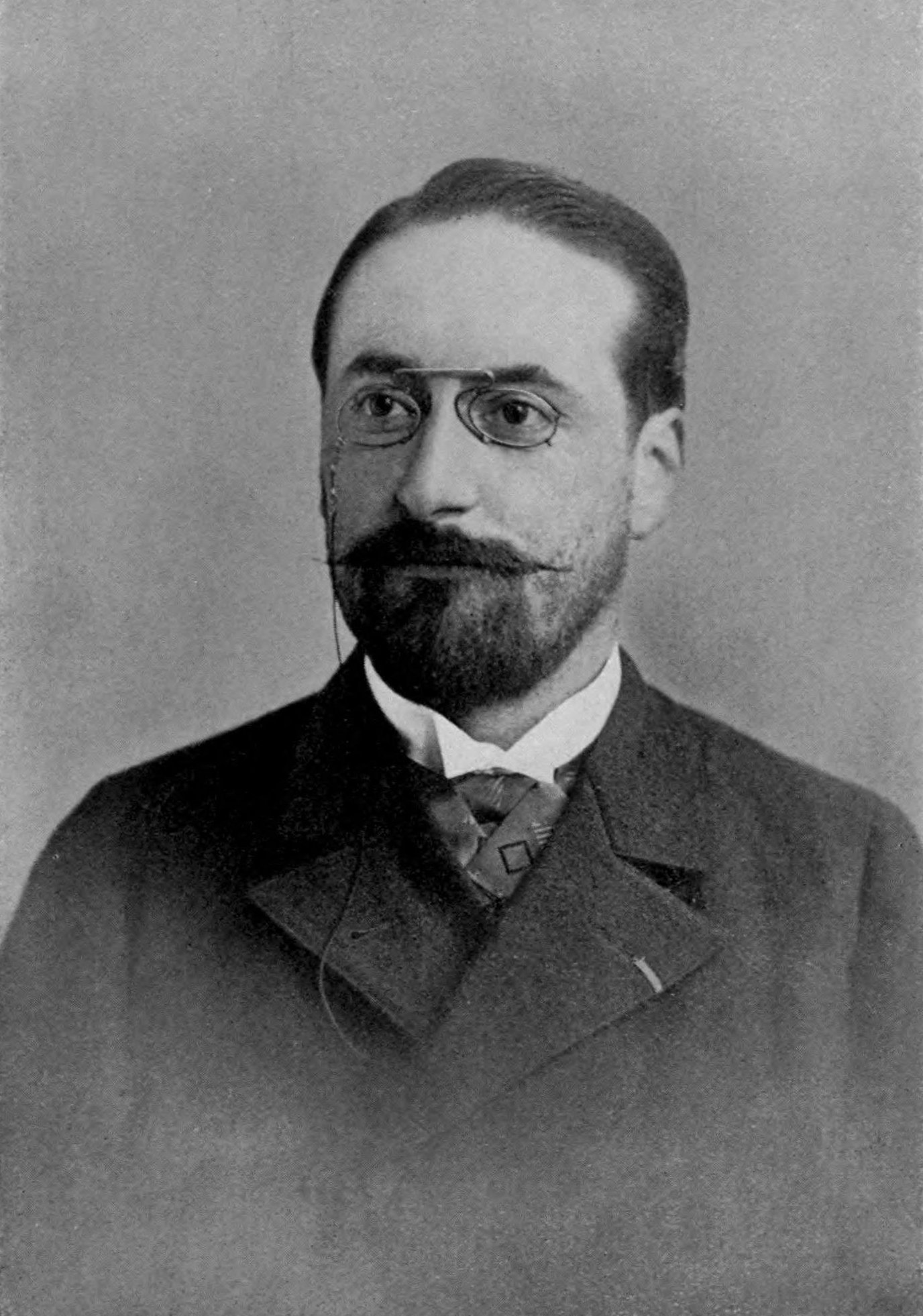
- Born: 31 March 1857; Nyon, Switzerland
- Died: 29 January 1910 (aged 52); Grasse, France

Édouard Rod (31 March 1857 – 29 January 1910) was a French-Swiss novelist.

== Early life and education ==
He was born at Nyon, in western Switzerland, studied at Lausanne, where he wrote his doctoral thesis about the Oedipus legend (Le développement de la légende d'Œdipe dans l'histoire de la littérature), and Berlin, and in 1878 relocated to Paris.

== Career ==
In 1881, he dedicated his novel, Palmyre Veulard, to Zola, of whom he was at this time of his career a faithful disciple. A series of novels of similar tendency followed. In 1884, he became editor of the magazine Revue contemporaine, and in 1887 succeeded Marc Monnier as professor of comparative literature at Geneva, where he remained until 1893.

His novel La Course à la mort (1888) marks a change of his literary style: in it he forsook the so-called naturalistic novel for analysis of moral motives. He is at his best in presenting cases of conscience, the struggle between passion and duty, and the virtues of renunciation. Le Sens de la vie (1889), one of his most famous books, is a complement to La Course à la mort. It was followed by Les Trois cœurs (1890), Le Sacrifice (1892), La Vie privée de Michel Teissier (1893), translated as The Private Life of an Eminent Politician (1893); La Seconde Vie de Michel Teissier (1894), Le Silence (1894), Les Roches blanches (1895), Le Dernier Refuge (1896), Le Ménage du pasteur Naudi (1898), a study of Protestant France; L'eau courante (1902), L'Inutile effort (1903), Un Vainqueur (1904), L'Indocile (1905), and L'Incendie (1906). M. Rod's books of literary criticism include Les Idées morales du temps présent (1897), Essai sur Goethe (1898), Stendhal (1892), and some collected essays. He published L'Affaire J.-J. Rousseau in 1906, and in the same year he produced from an episode in the life of that philosopher a play of three acts, Le Réformateur, which was produced at the Nouveau-Théâtre in Paris.

He died in the southeastern French town of Grasse in January 1910.

== Comment ==
Although liked by Tolstoy, Chekhov was not impressed by Rod. From the letters of Anton Chekhov, to Suvorin, 24 July 1891:

You once praised Rod, a French writer, and told me Tolstoy liked him. The other day I happened to read a novel of his and flung up my hands in amazement. He is equivalent to our Matchtet, only a little more intelligent. There is a terrible deal of affectation, dreariness, straining after originality, and as little of anything artistic as there was salt in that porridge we cooked in the evening at Bogimovo. In the preface, this Rod regrets that he was in the past a “naturalist,” and rejoices that the spiritualism of the latest recruits of literature has replaced materialism. Boyish boastfulness which is at the same time coarse and clumsy.... “If we are not as talented as you, Monsieur Zola, to make up for it we believe in God.”

== See also ==
- La Revue Contemporaine
