= Claes Annerstedt =

Swedish historian and librarian (1839–1927)

Claes Annerstedt (7 June 1839 – 20 November 1927) was a Swedish historian and librarian.

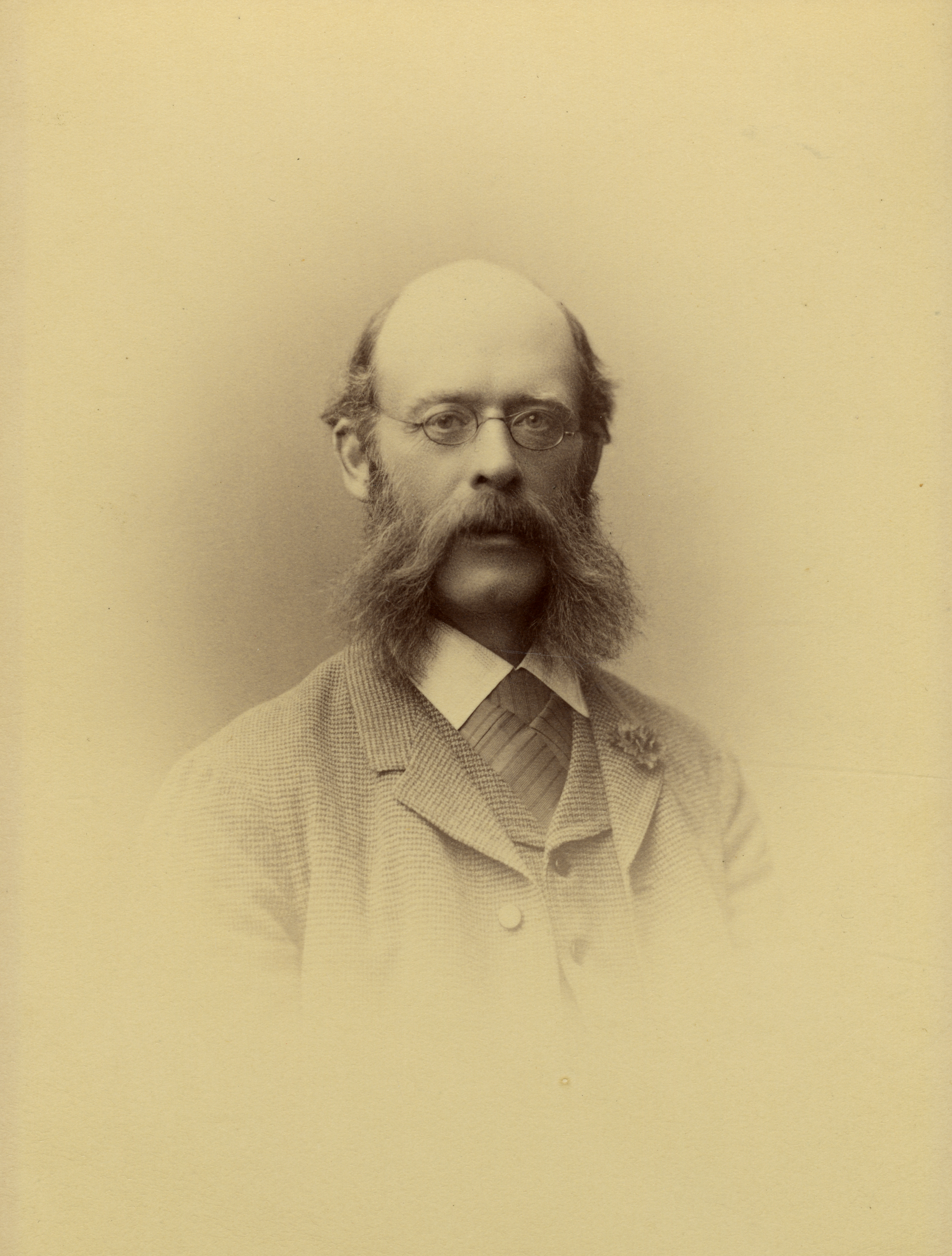
Claes Annerstedt, 1890

Annerstedt became doctor of philosophy in 1869 and associate professor the same year. Between 1883 and 1904 he was head librarian (in essence the director of the whole library) at Uppsala University Library and he wrote several lauded works about the history of the library. In 1901 he became a member of the Swedish Academy and in 1917 he was awarded an honorary doctorate in theology at Uppsala. He served as an elected local politician in Uppsala between 1883 and 1907.

== Sources ==
- Annerstedt, 4. Claes in Nordisk familjebok (2nd ed., 1904).
- Annerstedt, 4. Claes in Herman Hofberg, Svenskt biografiskt handlexikon (2nd ed., 1906).
- Annerstedt, Claes in Vem är det 1925.
- Schück, H.: Claes Annerstedt in Svenskt biografiskt lexikon (1920)
- Svenska män och kvinnor, vol. 1, Stockholm 1942, p. 113 f.
- Svenska Dagbladets årsbok – 1927, ed. Erik Rudberg & Edvin Hellblom, Åhlén & Åkerlunds Boktryckeri, Stockholm 1928 p. 236.
- Rolf Lindborg, "Claes Annerstedt. (Gestalter ur svensk lärdomshistoria 5.)" Lychnos Lärdomshistoriska samfundets årsbok 1989.
- Lars Munkhammar, "Ett sammanträffande." in: I lag med böcker. Festskrift till Ulf Göranson. (Acta Universitatis Upsaliensis. Acta Bibliothecae R. Universitatis Upsaliensis 44.) Uppsala 2013. ISSN 0346-7465 ISBN 978-91-554-8406-4, pp. 289–302.
- Torgny Nevéus, "Att växa upp i 1800-talets lärda Uppsala. Om Claes Annerstedts yngre år." Acta Universitatis Upsaliensis. Skrifter rörande Uppsala universitet. B. Inbjudningar 167. Uppsala 2012.

Cultural offices
Preceded by Gunnar Wennerberg	Swedish Academy, Seat No.2; 1901–1927	Succeeded by Martin Lamm
