= Sechs Lieder, Op. 4 =

Sajid Thalavarambu Bron 1995 December 1 Indian actor

Sechs Lieder
- Lieder by Max Reger
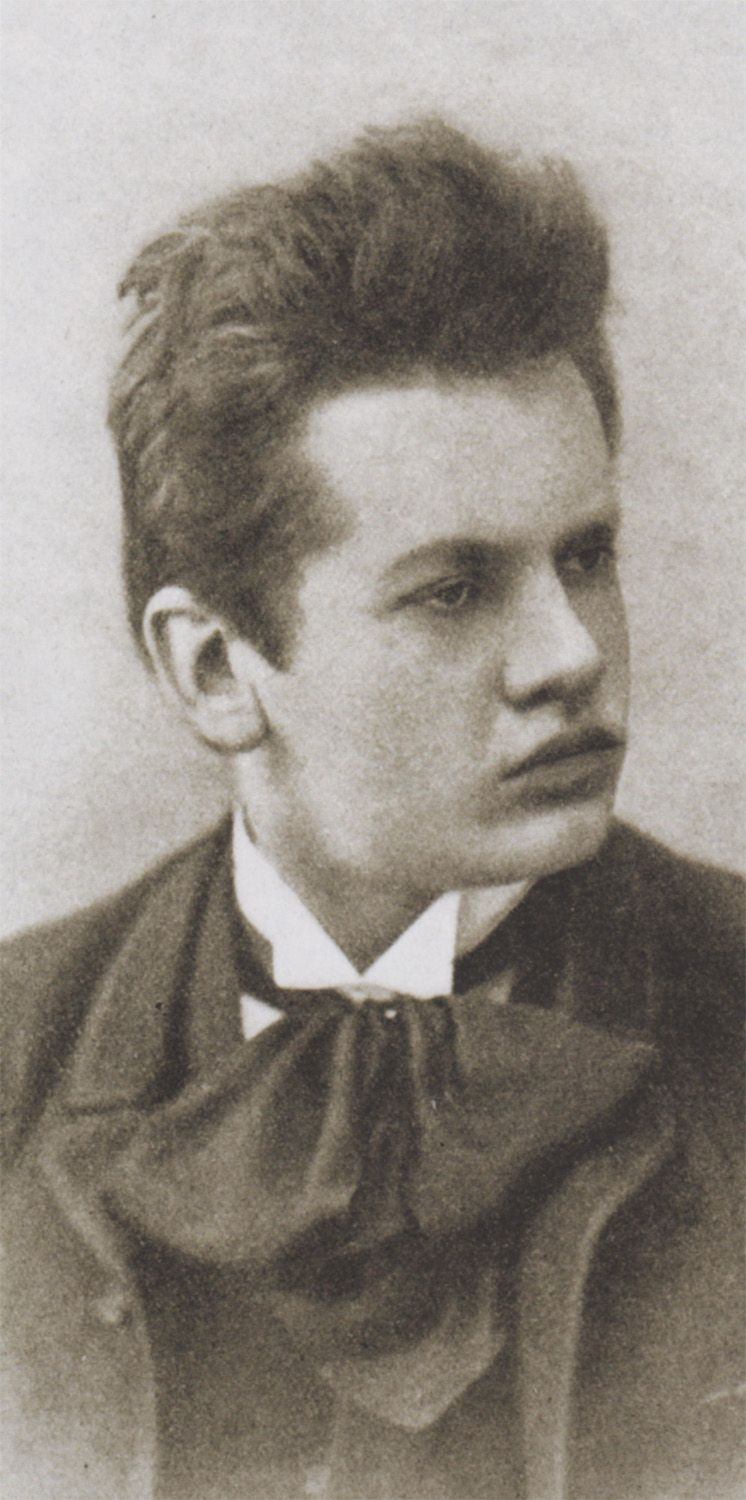
- Reger in 1890
- Opus: 4
- Language: German
- Composed: 1890–92
- Dedication: Elisabeth Riemann
- Published: 1893: London
- Scoring: medium voice; piano

Sechs Lieder (Six songs), Op. 4, is a set of six Lieder for medium voice and piano by Max Reger. He composed them in Weiden and Wiesbaden between 1890 and 1892, and dedicated them to Elisabeth Riemann. They were published by Augener & Co. in London.

== History ==
Reger composed the first song in Weiden in 1890, and the others in 1891 and 1892 in Wiesbaden where he studied at the conservatory from September 1890, composition with Hugo Riemann. Reger dedicated them to the singer Elisabeth Riemann, his teacher's wife. The collection Op. 4 contains the six first of Reger's almost 300 songs, begun when the composer was only 17. The first performance of an unspecified selection of four of them was at the conservatory of Wiesbaden on 8 August 1892, performed by Elisabeth Riemann and the composer. The songs were published by Augener & Co. in London with a translation by C. Hugo Laubach, probably before May 1893. Sophie Schröter and Reger performed songs No. 3, 5 and 6 at the Sing-Akademie zu Berlin on 14 February 1894 in the first documented performance.

== Text and music ==
The texts are poems by five authors:

1. "Gebet" (Friedrich Hebbel)
2. "Widmung" (Friedrich Rückert)
3. "Winterahnung" (Rückert)
4. "Im April" (Emanuel Geibel)
5. "Der zerrißne Grabkranz" Martin Greif)
6. "Bitte" (unknown)

In 2008, the musicologists Richard Mercier and Donald Nold dedicated a book to Reger's songs. They noted that he chose texts not by literary significance but for their theme and mood. Reger composed individual songs, not song cycles, and selected for his performances songs from different collections. Most of his songs are through-composed, even when stanzas sometimes begin with the same material. He favours syllabic rendition of the text, which helps its intelligibility. Usually his melodies require an accompaniment for expression.

Mercier and Nold noted the collection's variety of mood and tempo. "Gebet" (Prayer) is set as a slow chorale with continuous counterpart lines. "Widmung" (Dedication) is accompanied by triplets reminiscent of Schumann, while "Winterahnung" (Foreboding of winter) is reminiscent of Brahms. "Im April" (In April) has been called "one of Reger's sunniest songs", with lively music in a "rocky" rhythm representing spring. The dark mood of "Der zerrißne Grabkranz" (The broken grave wreath) is expressed in a hesitant slow beginning, accented by chords in the accompaniment. "Bitte" (Request) of "unsettled emotion" comes in phrases of irregular length.

== Bibliography ==
- Mercier, Richard; Nold, Donald (2008). The Songs of Max Reger: A Guide and Study. Scarecrow Press. ISBN 9781461707233.
- Parsons, James (2004). The Cambridge Companion to the Lied. Cambridge University Press. ISBN 9780521804714.
- "Max Reger Curriculum vitae". Max-Reger-Institute. Archived from the original on 28 September 2015.
- "Sechs Lieder, Op. 4" (in German). Max-Reger-Institute. 2016.
- "Reger in Karlsruhe 2016 / Programmbuch" (PDF) (in German). Max-Reger-Institute. 2016.
