= Egerton Ryerson Young =

Canadian methodist cleric and author

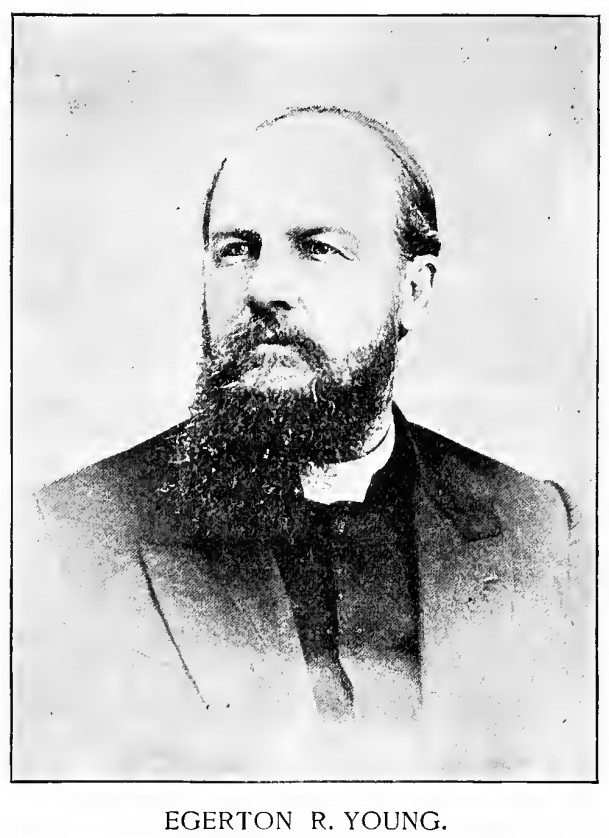
- Born: 7 April 1840; Crosby Township, Upper Canada
- Died: 5 October 1909 (aged 69); Bradford, Ontario
- Spouse: Elizabeth Bingham (m. 1867)

Egerton Ryerson Young (1840–1909) was a Canadian teacher, Methodist missionary, lecturer, and author.

By sharing his travels and mission work in his writing, E.R. Young helped popularize Methodist missions and expand the knowledge of the region.

== Biography ==
Young was born on 7 April 1840 in Crosby, Upper Canada, third son to Reverend William Young and Amanda Waldron. His mother died in 1842 hence was raised by his stepmother, Maria Farley.

Young started his adult life as a teacher, certified in June 1860. He stopped teaching in May 1863 after losing his original optimism. Then, following his father steps, he joined the Wesleyan Methodist Church In 1867, the year of the Canadian Confederation, he was ordained on 9 June, and married to Elizabeth Bingham on 25 December. They had five children.

In January 1868, Young was invited to become a missionary to natives of Rupert's Land. With his wife they decided to go on that journey, on 11 May 1868 they left for Red River, Manitoba to settle in Norway House. In January 1869, Young started his mission work among the Cree at Nelson House, where in June, Egerton Ryerson Junior, called Eddie, the Youngs' first son was born. During his time at Nelson House, Young visited the Saulteaux of Berens River, and in 1873 he was assigned to develop a mission there. In September 1875, Young and Elizabeth witnessed the Treaty 5 being signed. In the summer of 1876, leaving the mission one year earlier than the three-years term, the Youngs moved back to Ontario, in Port Perry. The reasons being for Eddie to attend school, but officially, "the reason cited was Elizabeth's poor health". After Young's time in missions, he only had poorly paid pastoral work in Ontario.

In May 1887, Mark Guy Pearse, a well-known Methodist preacher, lecturer, and author, visited Young at Meaford, Ontario. Pearse was "entranced" by Young's stories about his time in the missions and encouraged him to tell them. Pearse's objective, as he wrote in By canoe and dog-train's introduction, is "renewing the popular interest in foreign missionary enterprise". In 1888, Young gave lectures about mission life in the East of United States, British Isles and important cities in North America. In 1890, Young published his first book: By canoe and dog train among the Cree ad Salteaux. In his first book, he tells his journey and hardships in the cold northwest to meet and convert Cree. Thereafter, he wrote several other books one of the most known Stories from Indian wigwams and northern camp-fires (1892). In 1904-05, Young and his wife went on a trip around the world, with an extended stay in Australia for lectures and distribution of books.

Egerton Ryerson Young died on 5 October 1909 in Bradford, Ontario. He was buried in Bowmanville, Ontario.

== Works ==
Works written by E.R. Young:

- By canoe and dog train among the Cree and Salteaux (1890)
- Stories from Indian wigwams and northern camp-fires (1892)
- On the Indian trail; stories of missionary work among the Cree and Salteaux Indians
- My dogs in the Northland
- Algonquin Indian tales
- The apostle of the North, Rev. James Evans
- Three boys in the wild north land: summer
- Oowikapun or How the gospel reached the Nelson River Indians
- Indian life in the great North-West
- Winter adventures of three boys in the great lone land
- The bells of Christmas
- Three arrows: the young buffalo hunter
- Children of the forest: a story of Indian love
- Duck lake: stories of the Canadian backwoods
- Life among the red men of America
- Hector, my dog: his autobiography
