= Emil Reich =

Hungarian historian

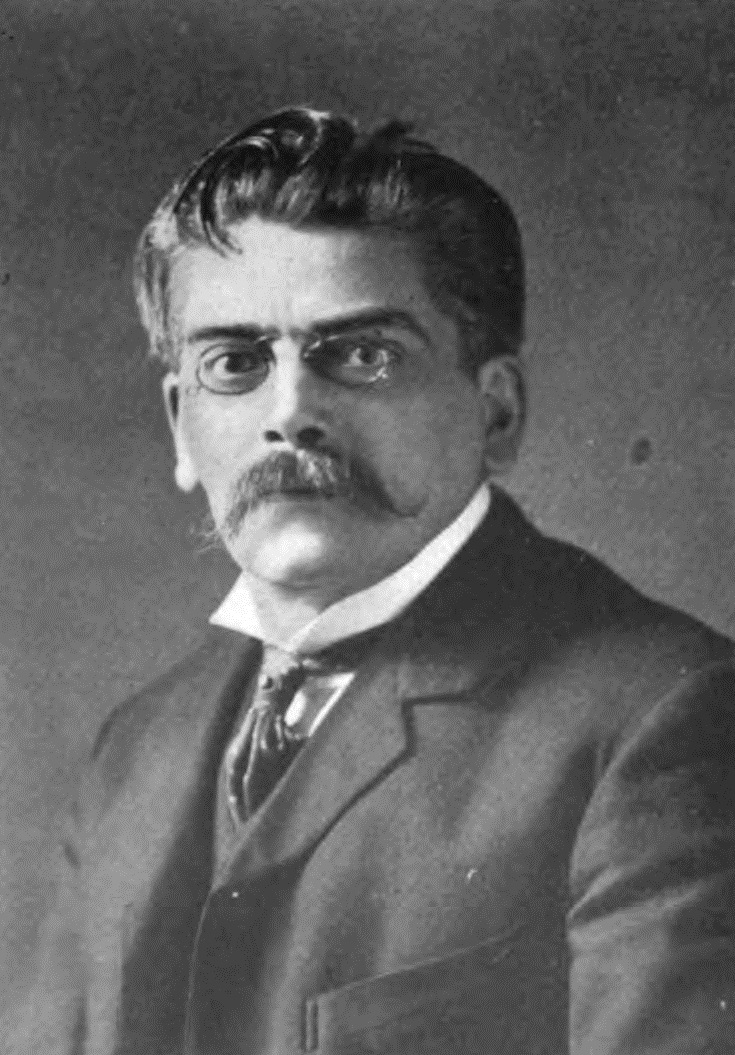
Portrait of Emil Reich

Emil Reich (24 March 1854 – 11 December 1910) was a Hungarian-born historian of a Jewish family who lived and worked in the United States and France before spending his final years in England.

Will Johnston has called Reich "a flowering of Hungarian improvisation" and "an unduly neglected English-language essayist". Reich's work, while lively, often fell down on detail and completeness. He loved paradox.

== Early life ==
According to Johnston, Reich was a Roman Catholic "born at Eperjes in today's Slovakia" (then part of the Austrian Empire). Other writers say he was Jewish.

The son of Louis Reich, the young Reich was educated at schools at Eperjes and at Kassa (then in Hungary, now in Slovakia) before taking a series of degrees at the universities of Prague, Budapest, and Vienna, where he graduated as a Doctor of Laws (Doctor Juris Universi).

== Career ==
In the summer of 1884 Reich emigrated to the United States in a family group consisting of his parents, one brother, and two sisters. In 1887 he gained a job with Appleton's of New York City, working on an encyclopaedia, while his brother became a photo-engraver in Cincinnati and one of his sisters a schoolteacher there. When their father died, their mother and one sister returned to Europe to live in Budapest.

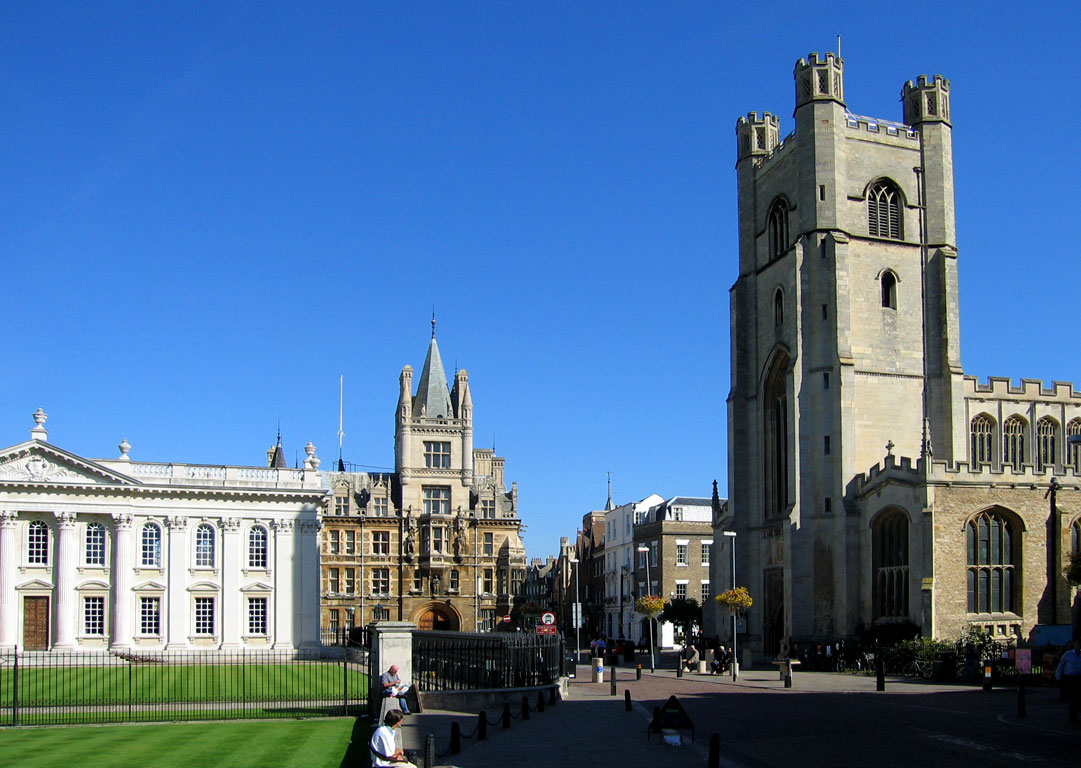
Cambridge, little changed from Reich's time

In 1889 Reich travelled to France and then to England. In the Hilary term of 1890 he gave four lectures at Oxford, published later that year as Graeco-Roman Institutions, in which his thesis was that Darwinian concepts did not apply to solving sociological problems. He then went to live in France, where in 1893 he married Céline Labulle, a Frenchwoman. After their marriage they settled permanently in Great Britain. Reich lectured at Oxford and Cambridge and in London, and he also taught candidates for the Civil Service. Following the Venezuela-Guiana boundary crisis of 1895, the British government employed him to help Sir Richard Webster with the preparation of the case for recognition of the British claims.

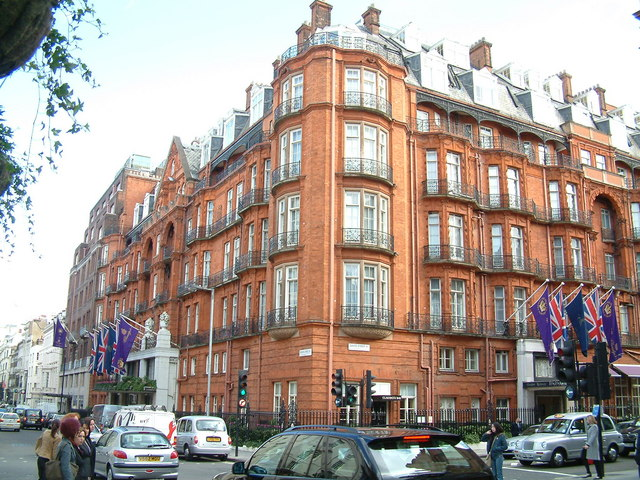
Claridge's Hotel

Reich was taken up by Lord Acton, who applauded him as a "universal specialist" and commissioned him to write on "Hungary and the Slavonic Kingdoms" for The Cambridge Modern History volume on the Renaissance. In his lectures on "Fundamental principles of evidence" and in The Failure of the Higher Criticism of the Bible (1905), Reich disputed the methodology of biblical criticism. His Hungarian Literature (1897) was very successful and went into a second edition in 1906. In his A General History of Western Nations from 5000 BC to 1900 AD (1908), Reich emphasised the geopolitical, economic, and environmental aspects of history, and indeed he was one of the first writers to use the term "geopolitical" in English.

In 1906 Reich became well known to London society by giving lectures on Plato at Claridge's Hotel. He followed up this success with his book Germany's Swelled Head (1907), which sold well. It was reissued in a new edition at the outbreak of the First World War in 1914, four years after Reich's death, when it became a well-known best-seller. A copy of Germany's Swelled Head was given to King Edward VII soon after it appeared in 1907, and the King asked for the views of Sir Donald Mackenzie Wallace on it. Wallace wrote to Lord Knollys, the king's private secretary:

What we have, as a nation, to fear is, I submit, not megalomania of the vulgar type called Swelled Head, but the quiet persistent carrying out of a well-considered policy which aims at destroying our naval supremacy, with a view to appropriating a large portion of our colonial Empire."

Germany's Swelled Head was followed by the more academic Handbook of Geography, Descriptive and Mathematical and Woman through the Ages, both published in 1908.

Johnston says of Reich that he "flaunted a feuilletonistic style", that he was "preoccupied by power politics and national character", and that he "extolled Hungarian imperialism as a wave of the future which would benefit south-eastern Europe in the way that Rome and Great Britain had uplifted their colonies". Of Jewish origins himself, Reich considered Zionism to be an aberration caused by the rootlessness of Jews and their lack of national feeling for the countries they lived in.

Reich summarised his own career in the British Who's Who:

Up to his 30th year studied almost exclusively in libraries; finding books unsatisfactory for a real comprehension of history, he determined to travel extensively in order to complement the study of books with the study of realities; spent five years in the United States, four in France, and was, with interruptions, for about thirteen years in England; lectured frequently at Oxford, Cambridge, and London Universities; was employed by Her late Majesty Queen Victoria's Government in the preparation of the British case in the Venezuela boundary affair.

Reich died in the winter of 1910 after a long illness and was buried at Kensal Green Cemetery. At the time of his death he was living in Notting Hill with his wife and one daughter.

== Works ==
- Graeco-Roman Institutions, from Anti-evolutionist Points of View (1890)
- Foundations of Modern Europe (1904)
- Success Among Nations (1904)
- Imperialism: Its Prices; Its Vocation (1905)
- The Failure of the 'Higher Criticism' of the Bible (1905)
- A General History of Western Nations from 5000 BC to 1900 AD (1908)
- Woman Through the Ages (1909)
