= Martin Greif (poet) =

German freelance writer of poems and dramas

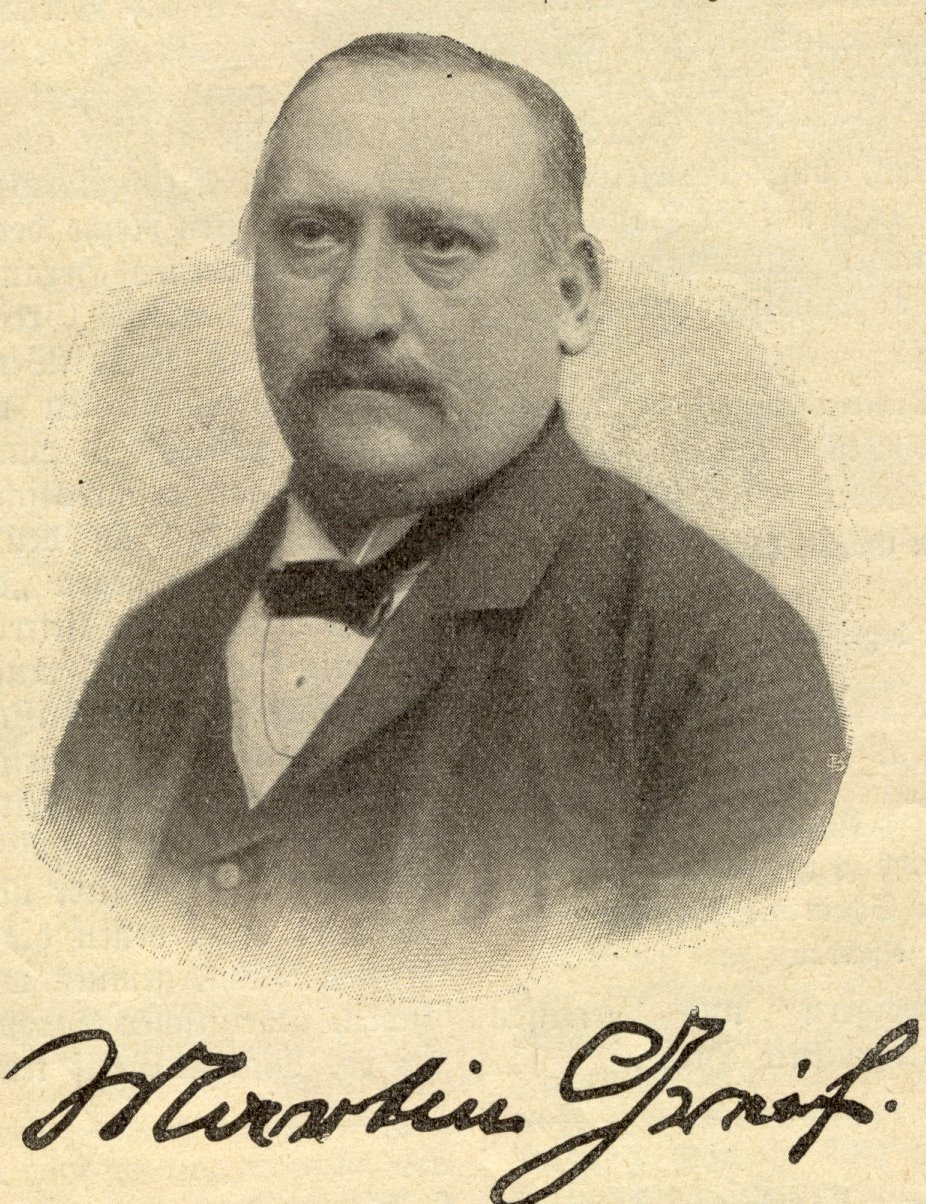
- Greif in 1898
- Born: Friedrich Hermann Frey; 18 June 1839; Speyer
- Died: 1 April 1911 (aged 71); Kufstein
- Occupations: Offizier; Poet; Dramatist

Martin Greif, born Friedrich Hermann Frey (18 June 1839 – 1 April 1911) was a German freelance writer of poems and dramas which were performed at the Burgtheater in Vienna and the Bavarian Court Theatre in Munich. His texts inspired compositions by Alban Berg, Max Reger, Erna Schorlemmer, and Pauline Volkstein, among others.

== Career ==
Friedrich Hermann Frey was born in Speyer, the son of Max Frey, who had served as Kabinettsrat of Otto of Greece, and his wife Adelheid Friederike, née Ehrmann. The family moved to Munich, where he made the Abitur. He joined the Bavarian military and was promoted to Offizier in 1859. He retired from the military in 1867 to live as a freelance writer. His first publications, enabled by Eduard Mörike were poems, published in 1868 by Cotta’sche Verlagsbuchhandlung unter the pen name Martin Greif, which he used as his official name from 1882 on. In 1869 he moved to Vienna, where many of his plays were successfully performed at the Burgtheater, thank to its artistic director Heinrich Laube. When Laube left the post, Greif returned to Munich and wrote patriotic dramas performed at the Bavarian Court Theatre.

He died in Kufstein.

== Work ==
Greif's drama on Agnes Bernauer has remained in the repertory of Bavarian lay theatre. Several of Greif's poems appeared in anthologies such as Hausbuch Deutscher Lyrik. His poem "Das klagende Lied" possibly inspired Gustav Mahler's cantata of the same name, written from 1878 on with a libretto by the composer. Several of Greif's poems were set to music, for example "Der zerrißne Grabkranz" by Max Reger as part of his Sechs Lieder, Op. 4. Alban Berg set his poem "Schattenleben" ("Phantom Life") in 1903 among his early songs, Anton Webern set his poem "Hochsommernacht".

His works include:

- Die Schlacht von Leipzig, München, 1863; work online
- Frühlingssturmlieder, München, 1864; book online
- Hans Sachs, Augsburg 1866; work online
- Gedichte, Stuttgart 1868; poem collection online
- Prinz Eugen, Kassel 1880
- Agnes Bernauer, der Engel von Augsburg, Leipzig 1894.
- Neue Lieder und Mären, Leipzig 1908

== Literature ==
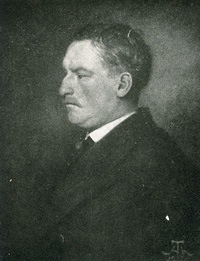
Martin Greif, portrayed by Hans Thoma

- Albert van Geelen: Martin Greif als Dramatiker in seinen Beziehungen zu Laube und zum Burgtheater unter Wilbrandt und Dingelstedt. Wächter-Verlag, Graz u. a. 1934.
- Fritz Kastner: Martin Greif. Bibliographie zu seinem Leben und Werk. Pfälzische Landesbibliothek, Speyer 1959.
- Laurenz Kiesgen: Martin Greif. Hesse u. Becker, Leipzig 1905.
- Wilhelm Kosch: Martin Greif in seinen Werken. Amelang, Leipzig 1907.
- Simon Prem: Martin Greif. Versuch zu einer Geschichte seines Lebens und Dichtens mit besonderer Rücksicht auf seine Dramen und seiner Stellung in der deutschen Litteratur. Renger, Leipzig 1892.
- Jocza Savits: Martin Greifs Dramen. Eine Studie. Engl, München 1911.
- C. Stemplinger: Martin Greif als Lyriker. In: Alte und Neue Welt; Illustriertes katholisches Familienblatt. 1898/99, p. 626–628.
- Antonia Kostretska (ed.): Martin Greif. Ausgewählte Gedichte in Deutsch und Russisch. Heidelberg 2011, ISBN 978-3-00-034527-2. (German, Russian)
