= Gustav Warneck =

Theologian and university teacher (1834–1910)

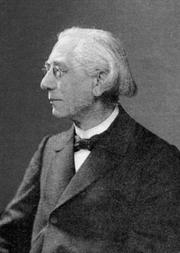

Gustav Adolf Warneck (1834–1910) was a German missiologist. In 1874, he established the first German missiological journal, Allgemeine Missionszeitschift. He was also involved in the founding of the German Protestant Missions Committee in 1885, serving as secretary until 1901. He held the first university chair in missiology at Halle University from 1896 to 1908. He is considered to be one of the first missiologists. David Bosch describes him as "the father of missiology as a theological discipline."

== Life ==
The oldest son of a master needlemaker, Warneck went from the family needleshop to study at the Francke Foundation and then studied with the theological faculty at Halle University beginning in 1855. During his studies he became a member of Hallenser Wingolf, a Christian non-denominational student association. After graduation he served as a private tutor and became an assistant pastor in Dommitzsch, Germany. In 1871 he was appointed as theological teacher for the Rhenish Mission Society in Barmen. Due to illness, however, in 1874 he moved to the parish office in Rothenschirmbach near Eisleben.

In 1874 Warneck founded the Allgemeine Missions-Zeitschrift, which he published in conjunction with Reinhold Grundemann. In 1879 he founded the Saxon Provincial Mission Conference. In 1896 he was appointed Professor of the Science of Mission (missiology) in the University of Halle which was the first time missiology was an academic discipline at a German university.

He was buried in the north cemetery in Halle an der Saale and wished for the words on his tombstone, "Let my grace be enough for you, because my strength is mighty in the weak."

== Writings ==
- Missionsstunden, Bd. 1: Die Mission im Lichte der Bibel. 1878
- Die gegenseitigen Beziehungen zwischen der modernen Mission und Kultur. 1879
- Die christliche Mission: ihre sachliche Begründung und thatsächliche Ausführung in der Gegenwart. 1879
- Abriß einer Geschichte der protestantischen Missionen. 1882
- Modern Missions and culture: their mutual relations. 1883
- Missionsstunden, Bd. 2: Die Mission in Bildern aus ihrer Geschichte. 1884
- Outline of the history of the Protestant missions from the Reformation to the present time: a contribution to recent church history. 1884
- Protestantische Beleuchtung der römischen Angriffe auf die evangelische Heidenmission. 1884–85
- Welche Pflichten legen uns unsere Kolonien auf?. 1885
- Die Mission in der Schule. Ein Handbuch für Lehrer. 1887
- Die Stellung der evangelischen Mission zur Sklavenfrage. 1889
- Der Evangelische Bund Und Seine Gegner. 1889 (The Evangelical Alliance and Its Opponents)
- History of Protestant missions. 1901
- Outline of a history of Protestant missions from the Reformation to the present. With an appendix on the Catholic missions. 1905
- The scientific study of missions. 1909
- Prayer for missions. 1930
- Die Apostolische Und Die Moderne Mission: Eine Apologetische Paralle (The Apostolic and the Modern Mission: An Apologetic Parallel)
- Evangelische Missionslehre, ein missionstheoretischer Versuch (Protestant Mission Theory, an Attempt at a Theory of Mission)
- Pauli bekehrung, eine apologie des christenthums (Paul's conversion, an apology of Christianity)
- Night and morning on Sumatra
- Protestant Missionary Doctrine
- Werner Raupp (Hrsg.): Mission in Quellentexten. Geschichte der Deutschen Evangelischen Mission von der Reformation bis zur Weltmissionskonferenz Edinburgh 1910, Erlangen/Bad Liebenzell 1990, S. 364–378 (Einl., Quellenauszüge, Lit.).* Evangelische Missionslehre. 1892, modernisierte Ausgabe 2015
