= Charles W. Kent =

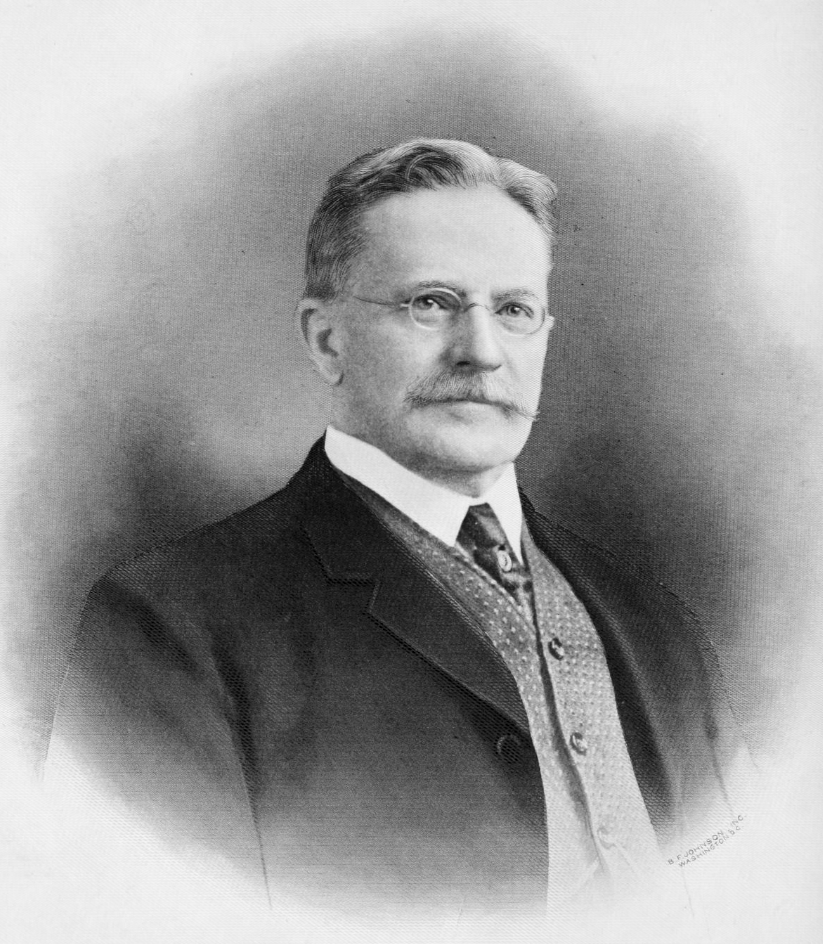
- Born: September 27, 1860; Kalona, Louisa County, Virginia
- Died: October 5, 1917 (aged 57); Charlottesville, Virginia
- Occupation: Scholar
- Spouse: Eleanor Miles (m. 1895)
- Children: 2

Charles William Kent (1860-1917) was an American scholar, who taught at the University of Virginia and the University of Tennessee. He edited a number of collections of poetry, including poetry from the American South, as well as the Old English poem Elene.

== Biography ==
Charles W. Kent was born in Kalona, in Louisa County, Virginia, on September 27, 1860. He attended the University of Virginia from 1878 to 1882, graduating with an M.A. With Lewis Minor Coleman he founded a college in Charleston, South Carolina, called Charleston University School, and taught there until 1884. He then studied in Germany, attending university in Gottingen and Berlin, and received his PhD in 1887 in Leipzig. He returned to the US, to the University of Virginia, where he taught French and German for a year, and then left for the University of Tennessee, where he became professor of English and modern languages. He left Knoxville in 1893 and returned to Virginia, where he became the first chair in the Linden Kent Memorial School of English Literature (the school was named for an older brother of his). He died at his home in Charlottesville, Virginia on October 5, 1917.

== Publications ==
Kent edited a number of books, including an anthology of Southern poetry, Southern Poems (Houghton Mifflin, 1913), and the Library of Southern Literature series (1909-1923). He also edited Cynewulf's Elene (1889), besides collections of poems including works by Alfred Lord Tennyson, Robert Burns, a posthumous edition of fellow Virginian Daniel Bedinger Lucas, and Edgar Allan Poe.

=== Selected publications ===
- Elene, An Old English Poem, edited with introduction, Latin original, notes, and complete glossary (Boston, Ginn & Co., 1889).
- Poems by Edgar Allan Poe (New York: The Macmillan Company, [1904]).
- Shakespeare Note-book (rev. ed.; Boston: Ginn & Co, [1906])

== Personal life ==
He married Eleanor Miles on June 4, 1895, and they had two children.
