= Francesco D'Ovidio =

Italian philologist and literary critic (1849–1925)

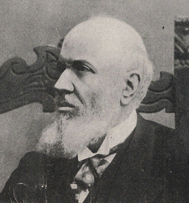
- Born: 5 December 1849; Campobasso, Italy
- Died: 24 November 1925 (aged 75); Naples, Italy

Academic work
- Discipline: philology literary criticism
- Sub-discipline: Romance philology
- Institutions: University of Naples
- Notable works: Dell' origine dell' unica forma flessionale del nome italiano (1872); Il vocalismo tonico italiano (1878); Storia della letteratura latina (1879); Il Tasso e la Lucrezia Bendidio-Machiavelli (1882)

Francesco D'Ovidio (Campobasso, 5 December 1849 – Naples, 24 November 1925) was an Italian philologist and literary critic. He was nominated for the Nobel Prize in Literature four times.

== Biography ==
He was educated at Pisa and Naples. In 1870 he became professor of Romance philology at the University of Naples.

Later he also became interested in Historical linguistics in general, urged there by Graziadio Isaia Ascoli, and "in 1871 he was called to teach Latin and Greek at the ‘Galvani’ high school in Bologna, and then in 1874 he moved to the ‘Parini’ high school in Milan, still engaged in the same teachings.

Then, still at a young age, he obtained the chair of comparative history of Neo-Latin languages at the Neapolitan university in 1876, holding it until the last months of his life. Certificates of merit for the work he did were attributed to him by Niccolò Tommaseo and Benedetto Croce, although the latter-especially for his "subtle and sometimes excessively meticulous" investigations of Dante -spoke ironically of "matters (...) d'ovidiane and not dantesche.

A member of the most important Neapolitan literary circles, he presided for a four-year term over the Accademia dei Lincei, and became a member of that of the Crusca[5], and of the Pontifical Academy of Arcadia. In his work of literary investigation he became interested in Dante Alighieri, Alessandro Manzoni, and Torquato Tasso.

With regard to the history of the Italian language, "D'Ovidio's position (of ‘practical common sense’ as Benedetto Croce recognized) was to adopt Florentine as the norm, as the much-admired Manzoni advocated, but corrected by the language of the literary tradition."

He was nominated for the Nobel Prize in Literature, and in 1905 he was appointed Senate of the Kingdom of Italy.

Although he was not a member of Freemasonry, unlike - probably - his brother Enrico he shared its aims and philosophy. Enrico was a distinguished mathematician, professor at the University of Turin and organizer-founder of the Polytechnic of that city. About his relations with Freemasonry, they were clarified by his own hand by Francesco in the text ""Freemasonry" contained in the second biographical volume entitled ‘ Old and New Regrets’ (vol. II, ed. Moderna, Caserta 1932)." Francesco D'Ovidio also dealt with aspects related to the way of speaking derived from the Campobassan dialect, and dedicated one of his writings to the recurrence of the First Centennial of the province of Molise. His drive was always aimed at the moral and social improvement of the inhabitants of his homeland, and at the event organized to mark the quarter-century since his death,President of Italy Luigi Einaudi spoke.

His disciples included Manfredi Porena, who was destined to become his son-in-law. The latter helped him and dictated many of his books after he turned 40 because a progressive disease of vision made it difficult for him to read books and write. By the time of his death he had become completely blind.

== Works ==
His thorough scholarship and keen criticism are shown in a large number of works, of which the following are the most noteworthy:

- Dell' origine dell' unica forma flessionale del nome italiano (1872)
- Il vocalismo tonico italiano (1878)
- Storia della letteratura latina (1879)
- Il Tasso e la Lucrezia Bendidio-Machiavelli (1882)
