= Ernest Lavisse =

French historian (1842–1922)

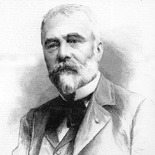
Ernest Lavisse

Ernest Lavisse (French: [lavis]; 17 December 1842 – 18 August 1922) was a French historian. He was nominated for the Nobel Prize in Literature five times. Lavisse is also known for being one of the main creator of the roman national ("national myth", lit. "national novel"), thanks to his history schoolbooks.

== Biography ==
He was born in Le Nouvion-en-Thiérache, Aisne.

In 1865 he obtained a fellowship in history, and in 1875 became a doctor of letters; he was appointed maître de conférence (1876) at the École Normale Supérieure, succeeding Fustel de Coulanges, and then professor of modern history at the Sorbonne (1888), in the place of Henri Wallon. He was an eloquent professor and very fond of young people, and played an important part in the revival of higher studies in France after 1871. His learning was displayed in his public lectures and his addresses, in his private lessons, where he taught a small number of pupils the historical method, and in his books, where he wrote ad probandum at least as much as ad narrandum: class-books, collections of articles, intermingled with personal reminiscences (Questions d'enseignement national, 1885; Etudes et étudiants, 1890; A propos de nos écoles, 1895), rough historical sketches (Vue générale de l'histoire politique de l'Europe, 1890), etc. According to the Encyclopædia Britannica Eleventh Edition, his works of learning are lucid and vivid.

After the Franco-Prussian War Lavisse studied the development of Prussia and wrote Etude sur l'une des origines de la monarchie prussienne, ou la Marche de Brandebourg sous la dynastie ascanienne, which was his thesis for his doctor's degree, and Études sur l'histoire de la Prusse (1879). In connection with his study of the Holy Roman Empire, and the cause of its decline, he wrote a number of articles which were published in the Revue des Deux Mondes, and he wrote Trois empereurs d'Allemagne (1888), La Jeunesse du grand Frédéric (1891) and Frédéric II. avant son avènement (1893) when studying the modern German empire and the grounds for its strength. With his friend Alfred Rambaud he conceived the plan of L'Histoire générale du IVe siècle à nos jours, to which, however, he contributed nothing.

He edited the Histoire de France depuis les origines jusqu'à la Révolution (1900–1912), in which he carefully revised the work of his numerous assistants, reserving the greatest part of the reign of Louis XIV for himself. This section occupies the whole of volume VII. Lavisse was admitted to the Académie Française on the death of Admiral Jurien de la Gravière in 1892, and after the death of James Darmesteter became editor of the Revue de Paris. He is, however, chiefly a master of pedagogy. When the école normale was joined to the university of Paris, Lavisse was appointed director of the new organization, which he had helped more than any one to bring about. After World War I, he edited the Histoire contemporaine de la France (1920–1922).

He died in Paris.
