= Albert Goossens =

Belgian singer

Albert Goossens (1887 – died some time before 1947) was a Belgian baritone singer, a refugee to Australia during WWI, who appeared many times on the concert stage, raising funds for the relief of his home country, accompanied by his wife Alice Goossens-Viceroy, an accomplished soprano, who remained in Australia as a teacher and concert performer.

== History ==
Goossens was born in Paris in 1887 into a musical family. His father was an opera singer who appeared at La Monnaie in Brussels, and his sister Marguerite Goossens (died 1917) was a leading soprano in Brussels. He was a boy soprano, singing at Sainte-Clotilde, Paris at the age of eleven. He studied singing at the Schola Cantorum and the Conservatorium at Bruges, where he was awarded the premier prix de chant avec grande distinction in 1908. He was subsequently engaged at the Theatre de la Monnaie in Brussels, making his debut in Carmen as Escamillo.

He was injured in the fighting during the 1914 German invasion of Belgium, and escaped to London, where he married Alice Leontine Melanie Viceroy (born 1887), a principal artist with the Royal Opera in Brussels. They were then contracted to appear in Australia with J. & N. Tait's Belgian Band, which included several refugees.

=== Australia ===
The Goossens arrived in Fremantle by the SS Modena on 1 June 1915 and Sydney shortly after. In an advertisement for a concert to be held on 3 July 1915 in aid of the Belgian relief funds, his service in the defence of Belgium was described:

Until he was wounded he participated in six battles. Before the fighting at Liege, Termonde, Malines, and Haalen, Mons. Goossens stirred his fellow-Belgian soldiers by singing "The Brabançonne" (the National Anthem of Belgium) just as they were going into action.

They appeared in numerous patriotic and fund-raising concerts with the "Belgian Band". A feature of several of these concerts was a performance of Elgar's Carillon with recitation ("Sing, Belgians, Sing") by Frank Greene.

Goossens was appointed to the teaching staff of Sydney Conservatorium. He left Australia in 1921 to "take up an important operatic engagement" in Belgium. and apparently never returned. He died some time before 1947.

His wife, often referred to as Alice Goossens-Viceroy, was engaged as soprano with the New South Wales State Orchestra in 1920, and taught at the State Conservatorium. Mme Goossens left Australia in late 1927 for a holiday, returning in July 1928. She was naturalized as an Australian British subject on 23 July 1940. Her address at the time was Killara, New South Wales.

Their daughter Renee Goossens was a coloratura soprano, taught at the Pennant Hills School of Music, the Sydney Conservatorium from 1952 to 1960, and at the Melba Conservatorium.

Not to be confused with Renée Goossens (born 1940), youngest daughter of (the unrelated) Sir Eugene Goossens.

She married Robert Mowatt; they had a daughter Christine Mowatt (born 30 January 1942).
