= Frank Greene (singer) =

English baritone singer and comedian

Frank William Greene (28 December 1878 – ) was an English baritone singer and comedian in Australia from 1909–20, when he left for America.

== Biography ==
Greene was born in 1878 in Portsmouth, England, to Richard and Edith Green. His father was a retired navyman. He married the actress Lottie Sargent in London in 1900. Both were brought to Australia, along with Dorothy Court and conductor Fritz Hart, as members of J. C. Williamson's new company (the Musical Comedy Company having been disbanded) aboard R.M.S. China for the musical King of Cadonia, which opened in Sydney on 21 August 1909, playing Captain Laski.

He appeared in A Country Girl, Havana, The Dollar Princess, The Merry Widow, The Girl in the Train, Prince Carlo in The Quaker Girl, of fond memory, Florodora, and The Sunshine Girl. He was in May 1914 recruited to Come Over Here, dubbed "Australia's first revue" which was running successfully at Her Majesty's Theatre, Sydney.

He appeared in Alfred Cellier's Dorothy with Florence Young,

He participated in a charity fete organised by Hugh J. Ward in aid of the proposed "Hospice for the Dying", where each stall represented a popular stage show, manned by cast members in costume.

He was associated with the Tivoli Follies from June 1915 to April 1917. In March 1916 he recited Elgar's Carillon with the Brussels concert party, as a tribute to the Belgian nation, wearing a uniform borrowed from Albert Goossens, the Belgian baritone. He took part in the Anzac Day concert in Sydney, 25 April 1916, with other members of the Tivoli Follies. He took part in several of Jack Haskell's revues, including Bing Boys on Broadway in 1919,

He left for America by the SS Sonoma on 17 August 1920. After a slow start, in 1922 he was reported as playing at the Apollo Theater, Chicago, followed by The Dancing Girl (Marie Dressler's last stage appearance) at the Winter Garden Theatre. In 1925 he was playing second lead in Rose-Marie on Broadway.

=== Lottie Sargent ===
Sargent arrived in Sydney with Greene, and played in several musical comedies, including The Balkan Princess and The Dollar Princess and later Thank U with the John D. O'Hara company, but was troubled with ill-health which a move to Queensland failed to ameliorate. Reports that she left Brisbane to join her husband turned out to be false, as she died in a Brisbane private hospital on 28 October 1925.

== Family ==
He was a brother of the actress Evie Greene (1875–1917), star of the original Florodora. The film star Richard Greene (1918–1985) was a nephew.
