= Sainte-Clotilde, Paris =

Basilica in Paris, France

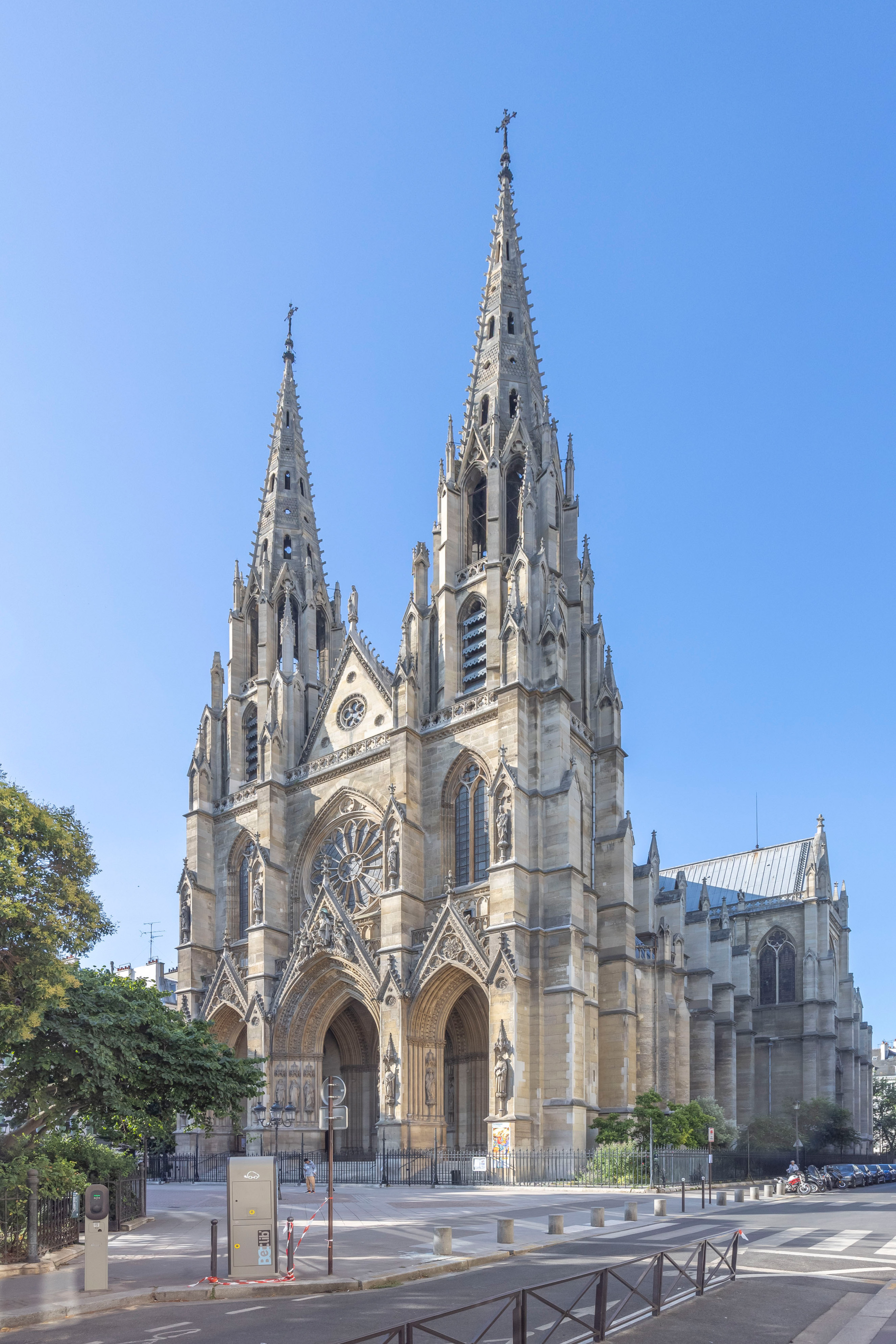
- The west front of the church
- Sainte-Clotilde, Paris
- 48.858333°N 2.319167°E
- Country: France
- Denomination: Roman Catholic
- Website: www.sainte-clotilde.com

History
- Status: Minor Basilica

Architecture
- Functional status: Active
- Heritage designation: Monument historique
- Style: Gothic Revival
- Groundbreaking: 1846
- Completed: 1857

Administration
- Archdiocese: Paris

The Basilica of Saint Clotilde (Basilique Ste-Clotilde) is a basilica church located on the Rue Las Cases, in the 7th arrondissement of Paris. It was constructed between 1846 and 1856, and is the first example of a church in Paris in the neo-Gothic style.

The church takes its name from Saint Clotilde, the wife of King Clovis I, the first King of the Franks. She is said to have persuaded him to convert to Christianity as a condition of their marriage in 496.

The composer César Franck was organist of the church for thirty years.

== History ==
The church was constructed between 1846 and 1856 on the site of an earlier Carmelite monastery. The original design was by architect Franz Christian Gau, a German-born French architect and archeologist who made his career in France. It was the first example of a church in the neo-Gothic style in Paris. Work began in 1846, but Gau died in 1853; the work was continued by Théodore Ballu who completed the church in 1857. Ballu extended the front of the church by several meters to give it greater depth, and built the two towers, to give it the majesty of a small cathedral. It was opened on 30 November 1857 by Cardinal Morlot. In 1896, In 1860 Ballu was named architect of religious buildings for the city of Paris, and completed a series of other churches in the neo-Gothic style.

In 1896 The church was declared a minor basilica by Pope Leo XIII, to commemorate the anniversary of the conversion of Clovis in 496.

The design of the basilica was copied by the architect Léon Vautrin for the construction of the facade of the Sacred Heart Cathedral in Guangzhou between 1863 and 1888.

== Exterior ==
The west front of the church is in the Flamboyant Gothic style; the spires of the two towers reach a height of seventy meters. The facade has three portals in bays with high pointed arches and sculptural decoration Statues on thrones on the west front depict Saint Clotilde and Saint Valere, the Bishop of Treves in the 3rd century, who each played an important part in the early French Christian church.

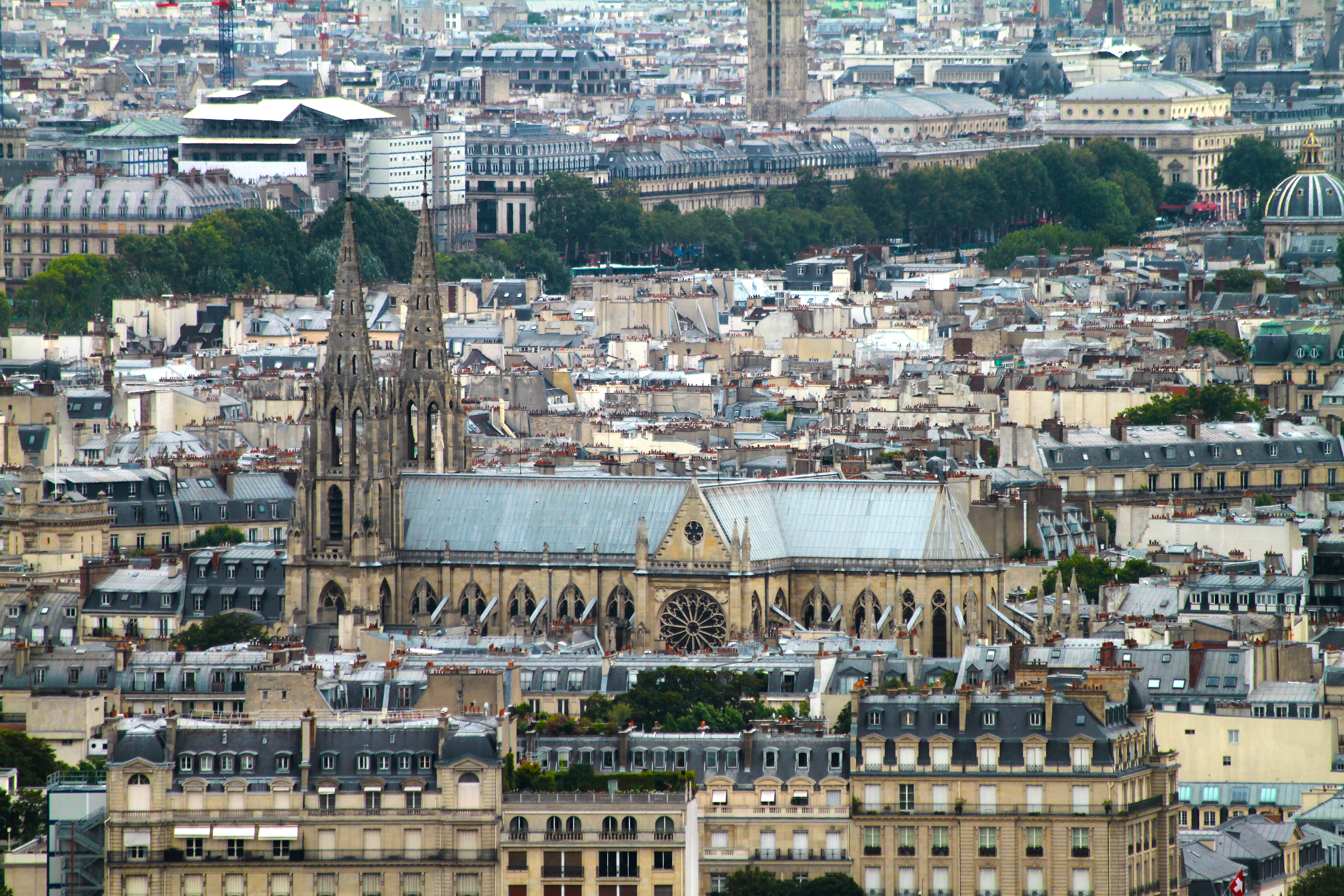
The church viewed from the Eiffel Tower

The semi-circular chevet of the church, at the opposite end from the facade, is ringed by buttresses and pinnacles supporting the walls, modeled after those of a Gothic cathedral. Their presence is decorative, since the structure is built with an iron frame designed by Gustave Eiffel.

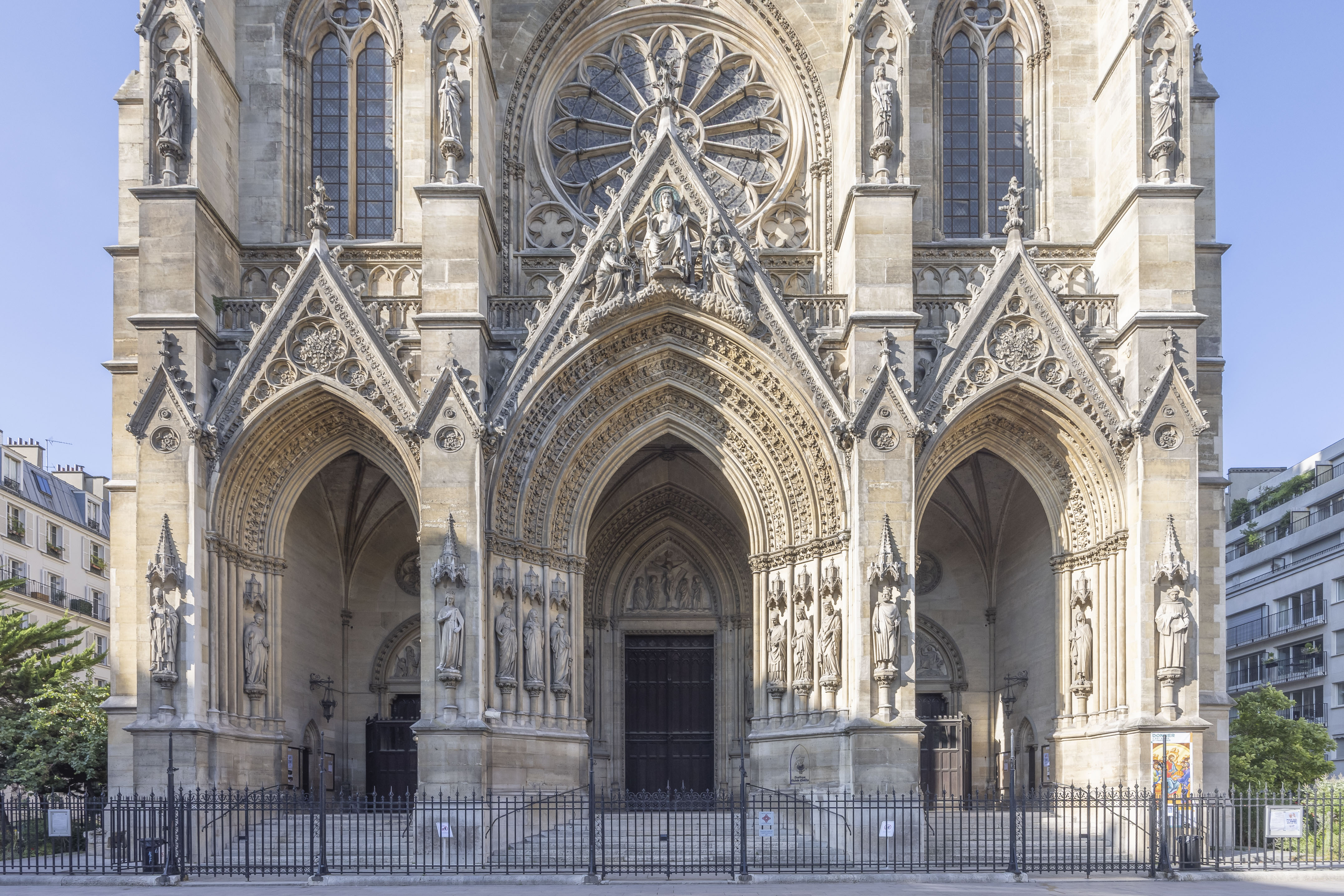
The west front and portals

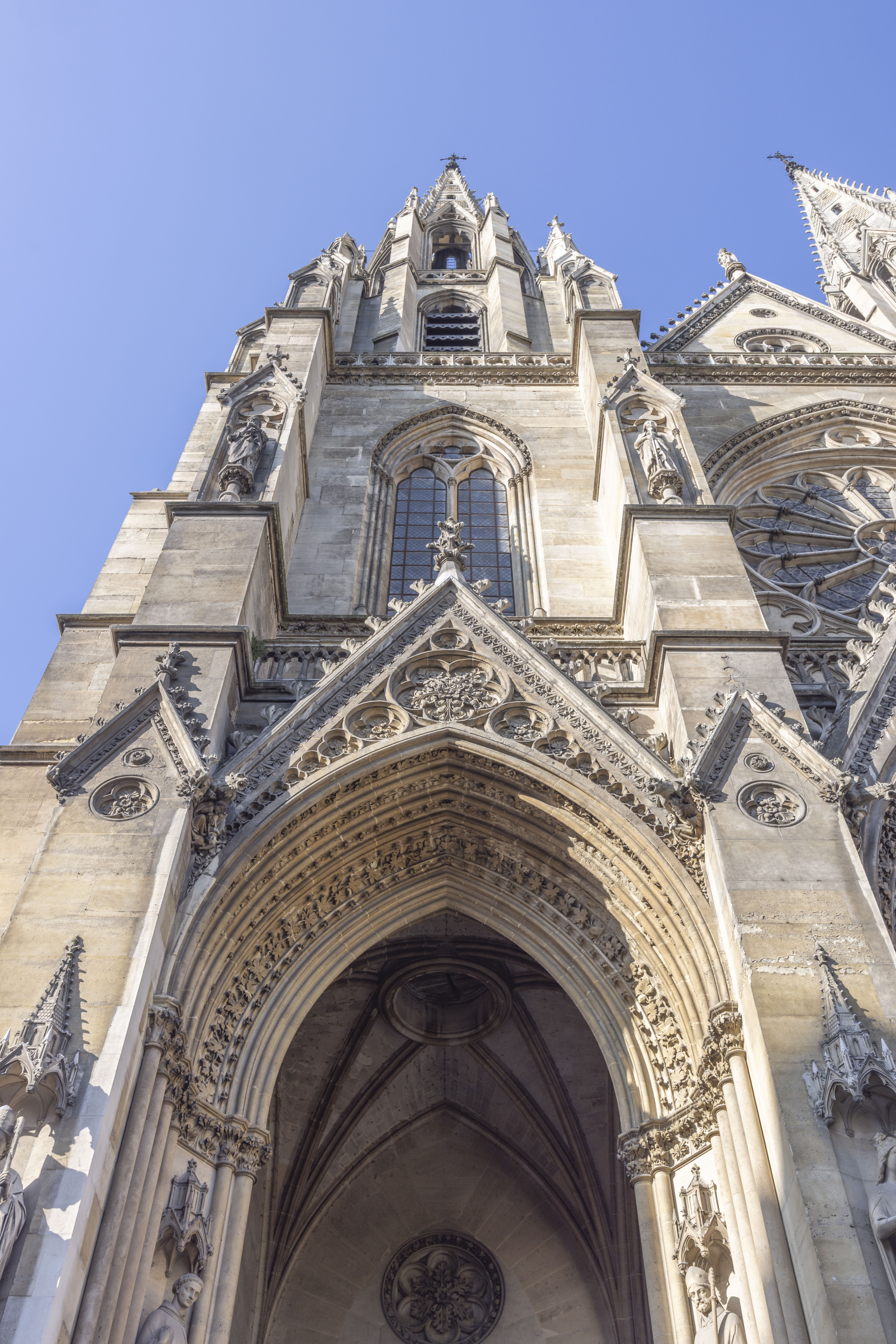
The east tower

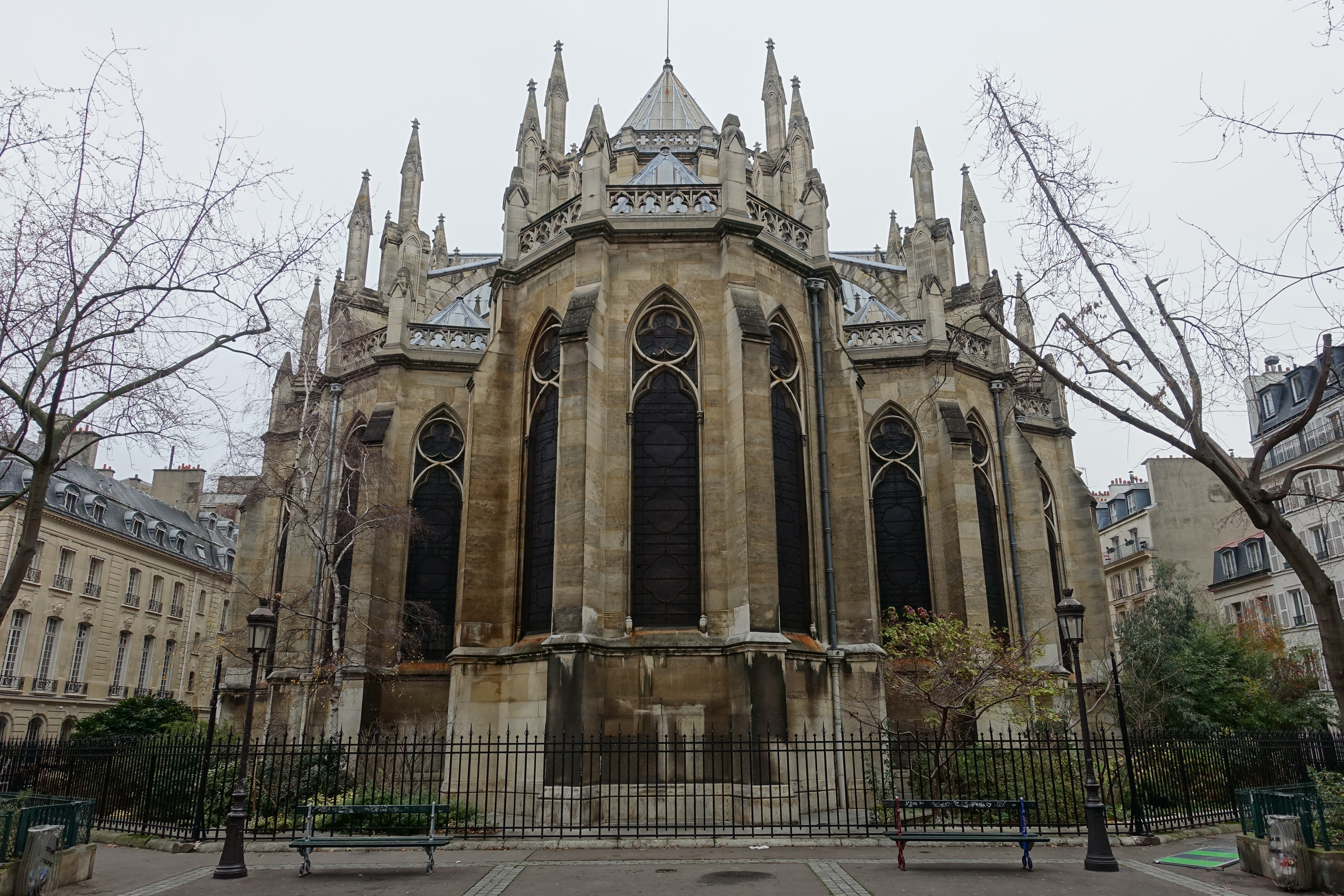
The pinnacles and buttresses of the apse are decorative, since the church has an iron frame

== Interior ==
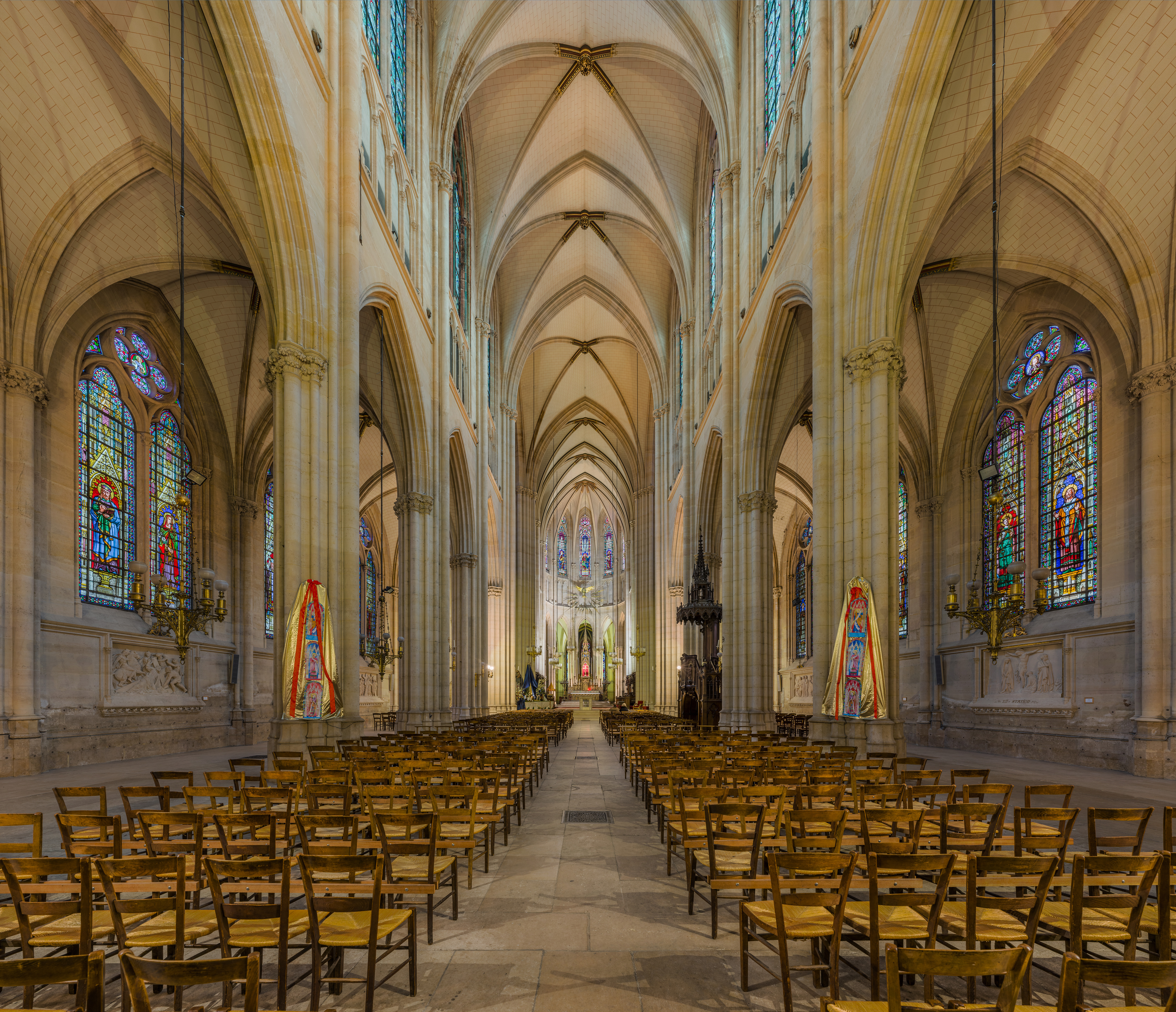
Nave and collateral aisles

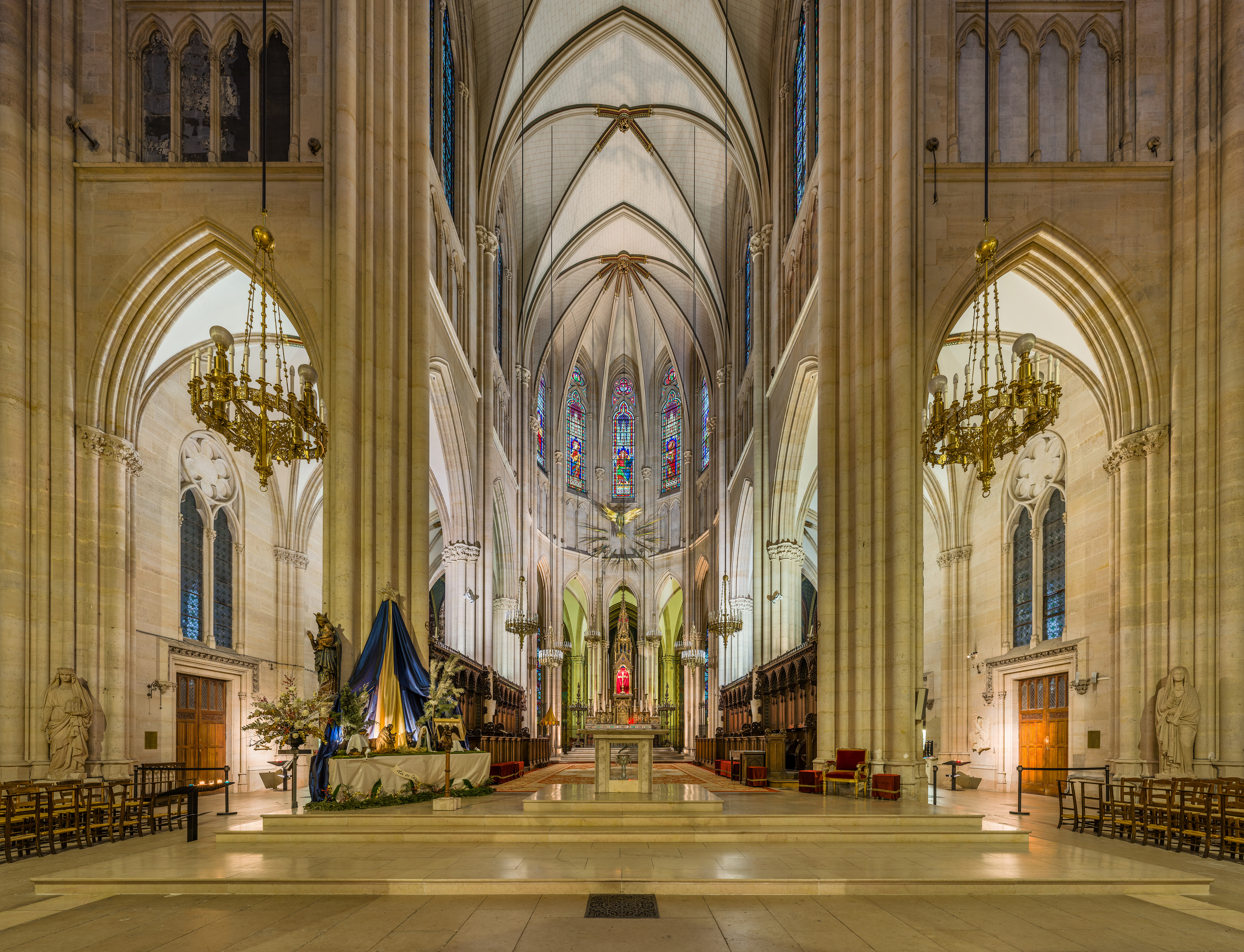
The Choir

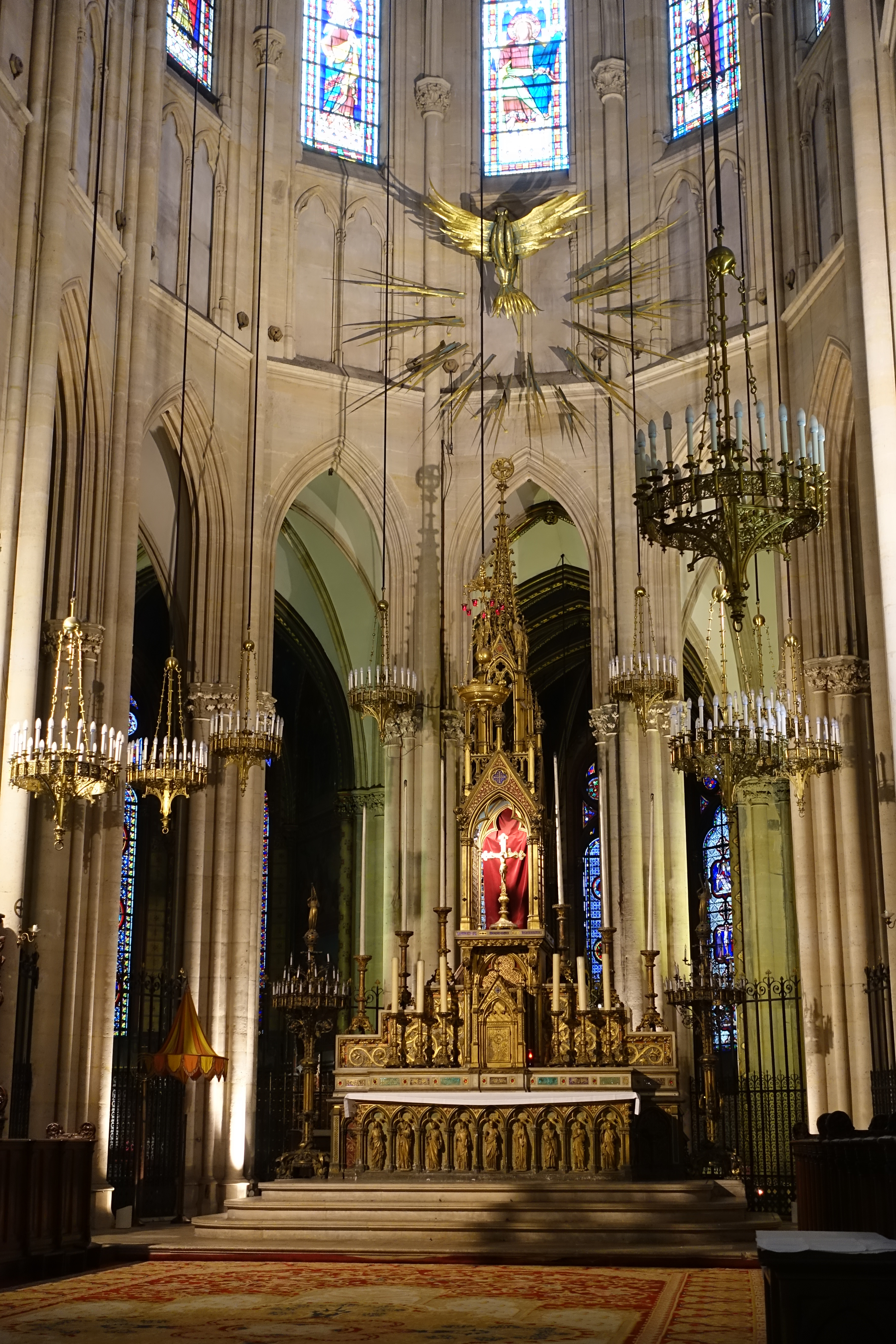
The main altar

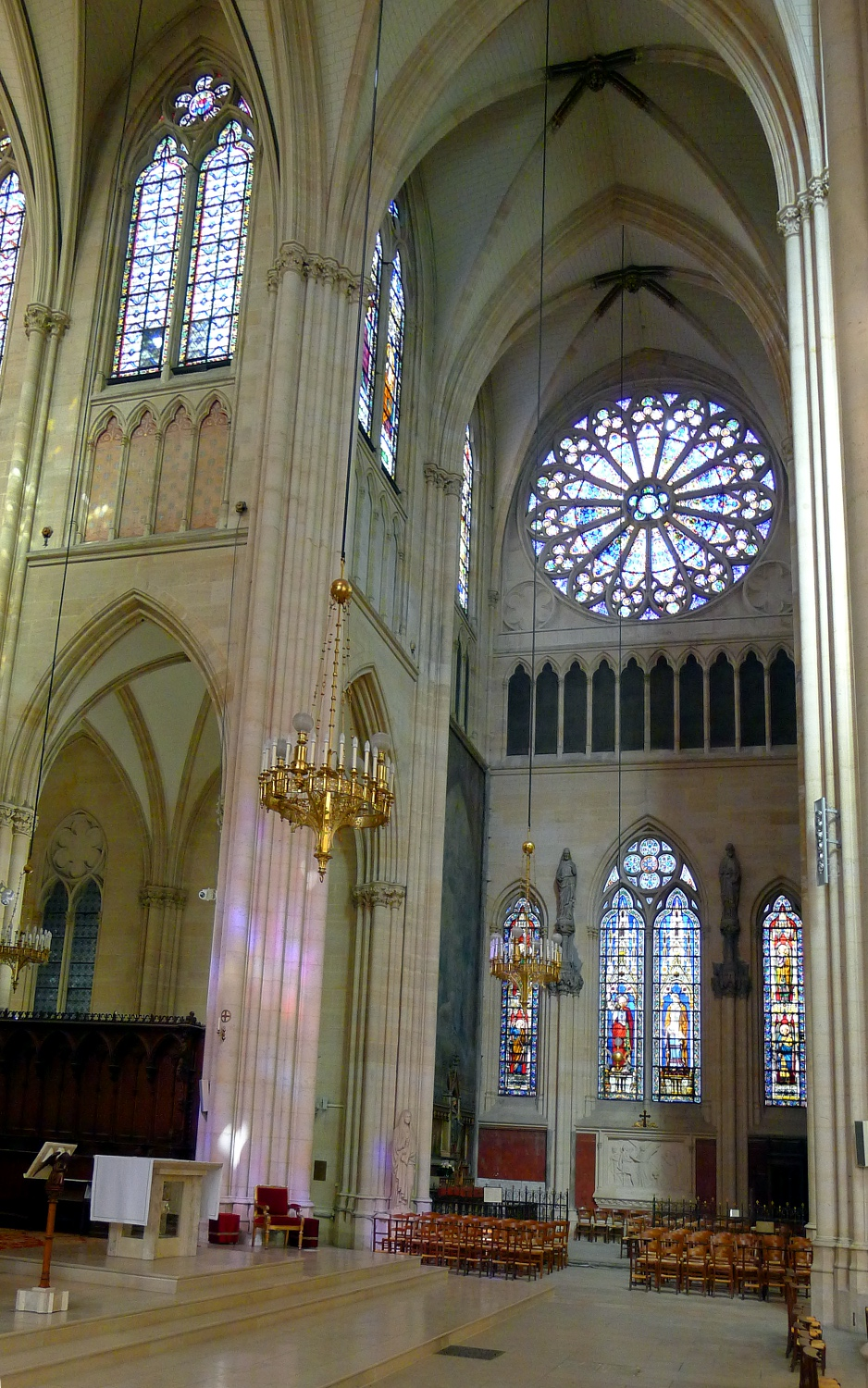
The right transept

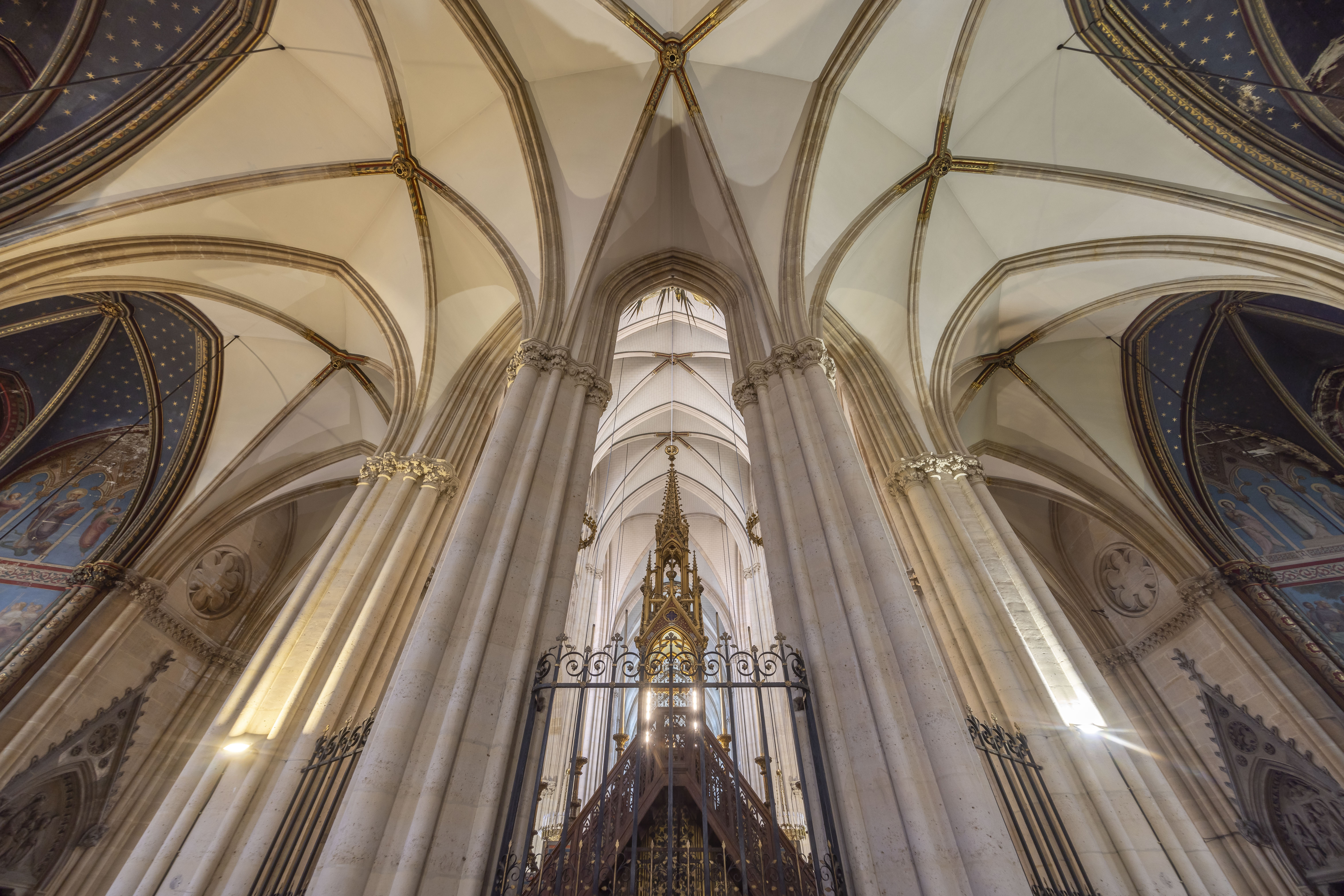
The ambulatory

The interior of the church is 96 metres long and 39 metres wide, the dimensions of a small cathedral. It has an abundance of light coming from the stained glass windows high on the walls. The outer aisles are separated from the nave by an arcade of tall classical pillars, which form pointed arches, and branch out into slender colonettes which reach upward to support the vaults of the ceiling.

Like most Gothic cathedrals, the walls of the nave are divided into three horizontal levels; a gallery with high pillars and pointed arches on the ground level; a triforium, or gallery without windows, just above; and stained glass windows filling the walls on the upper level, between the triforium and the vaults.

=== Chapels ===
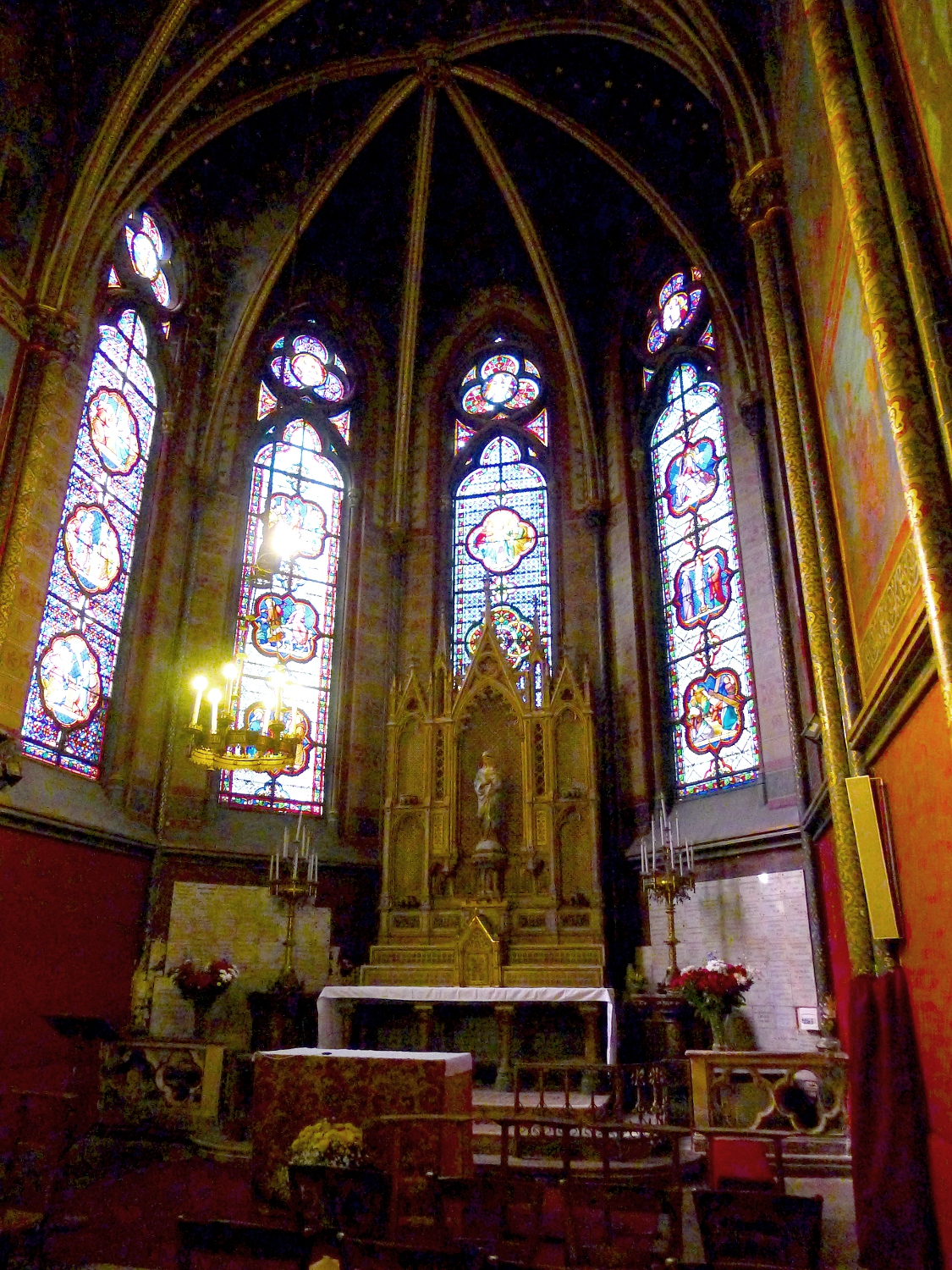
Chapel of the Virgin

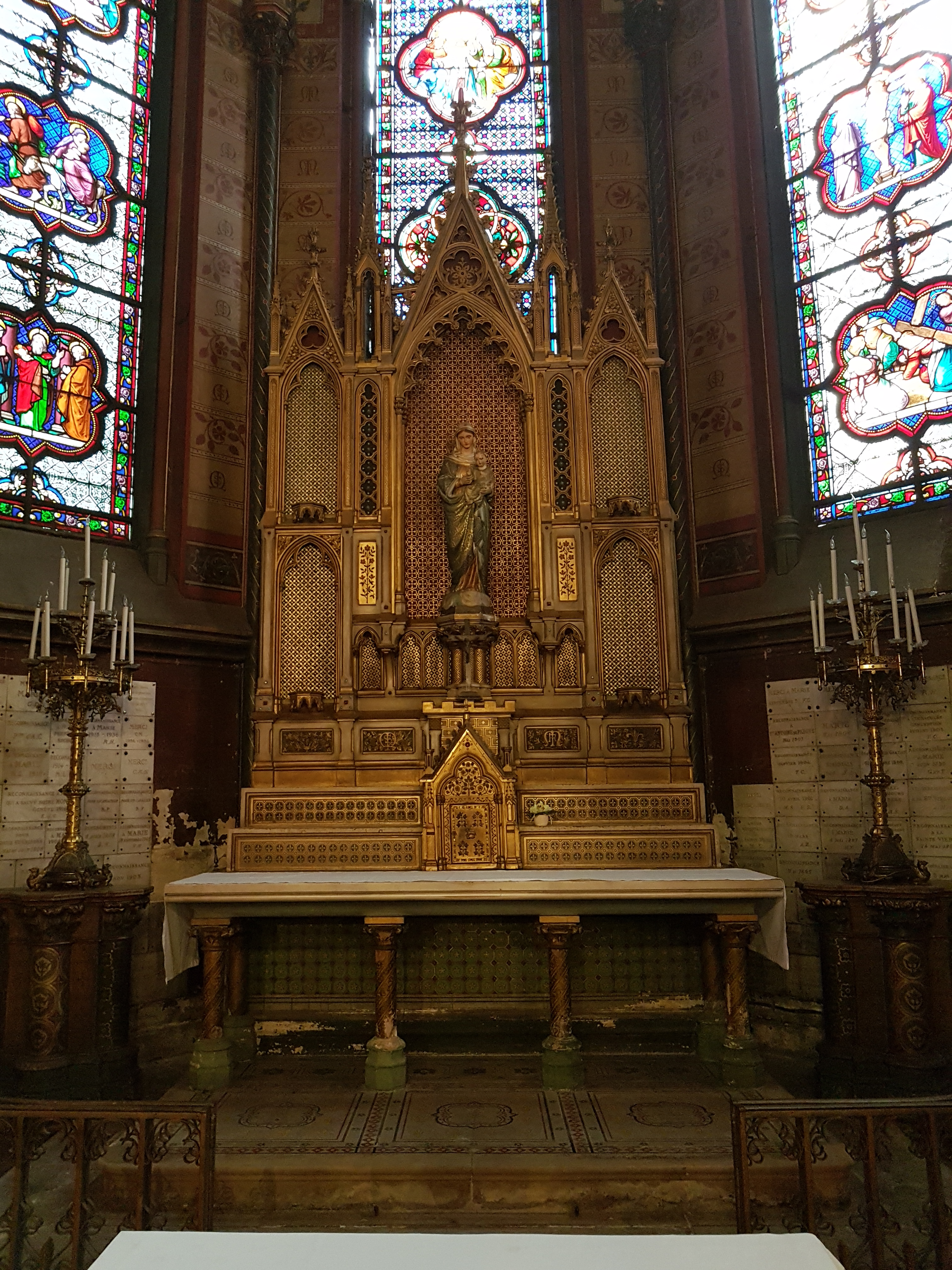
Altar in the Chapel of the Virgin

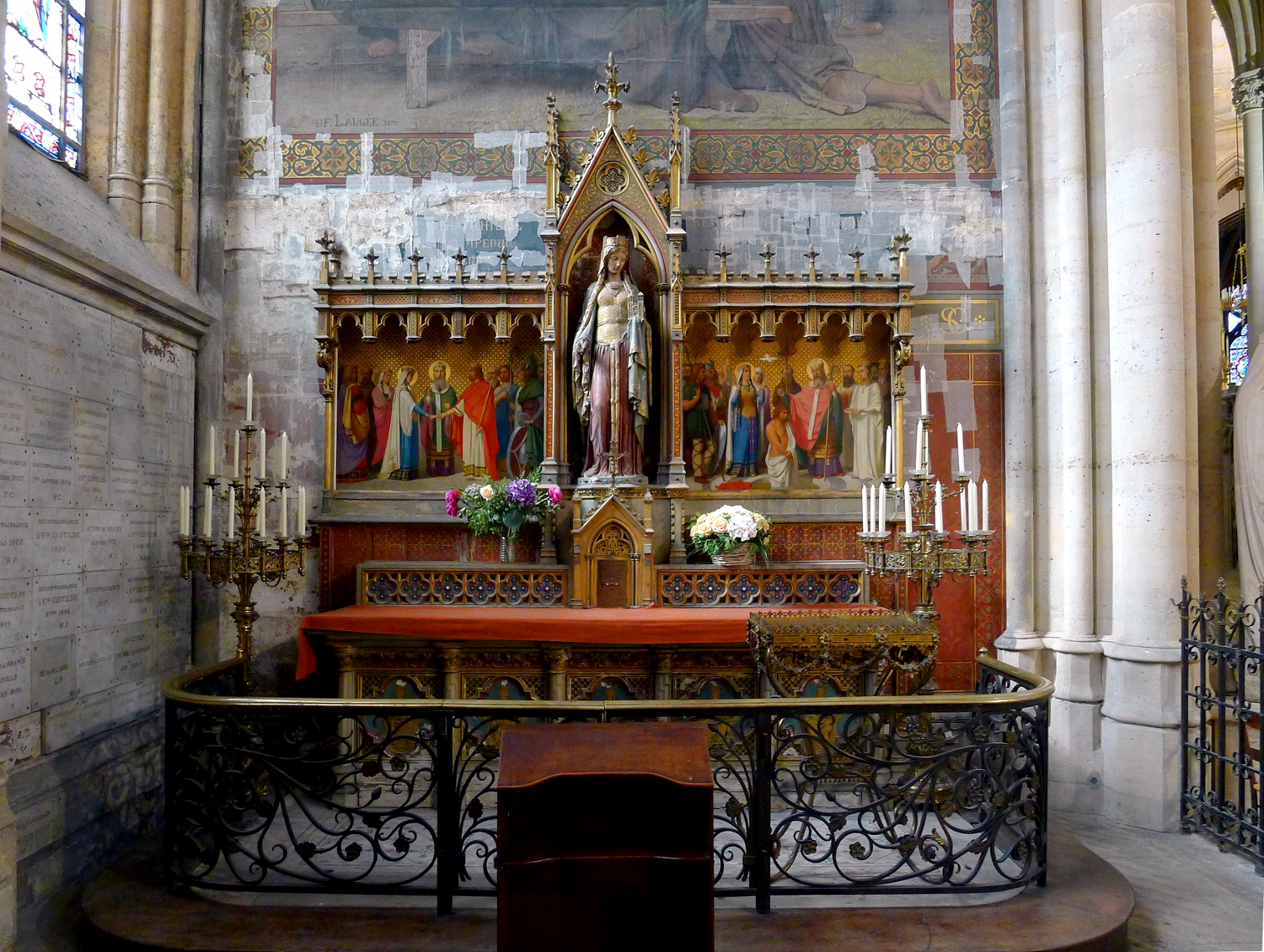
Altar in the Chapel of Saint Clotilde

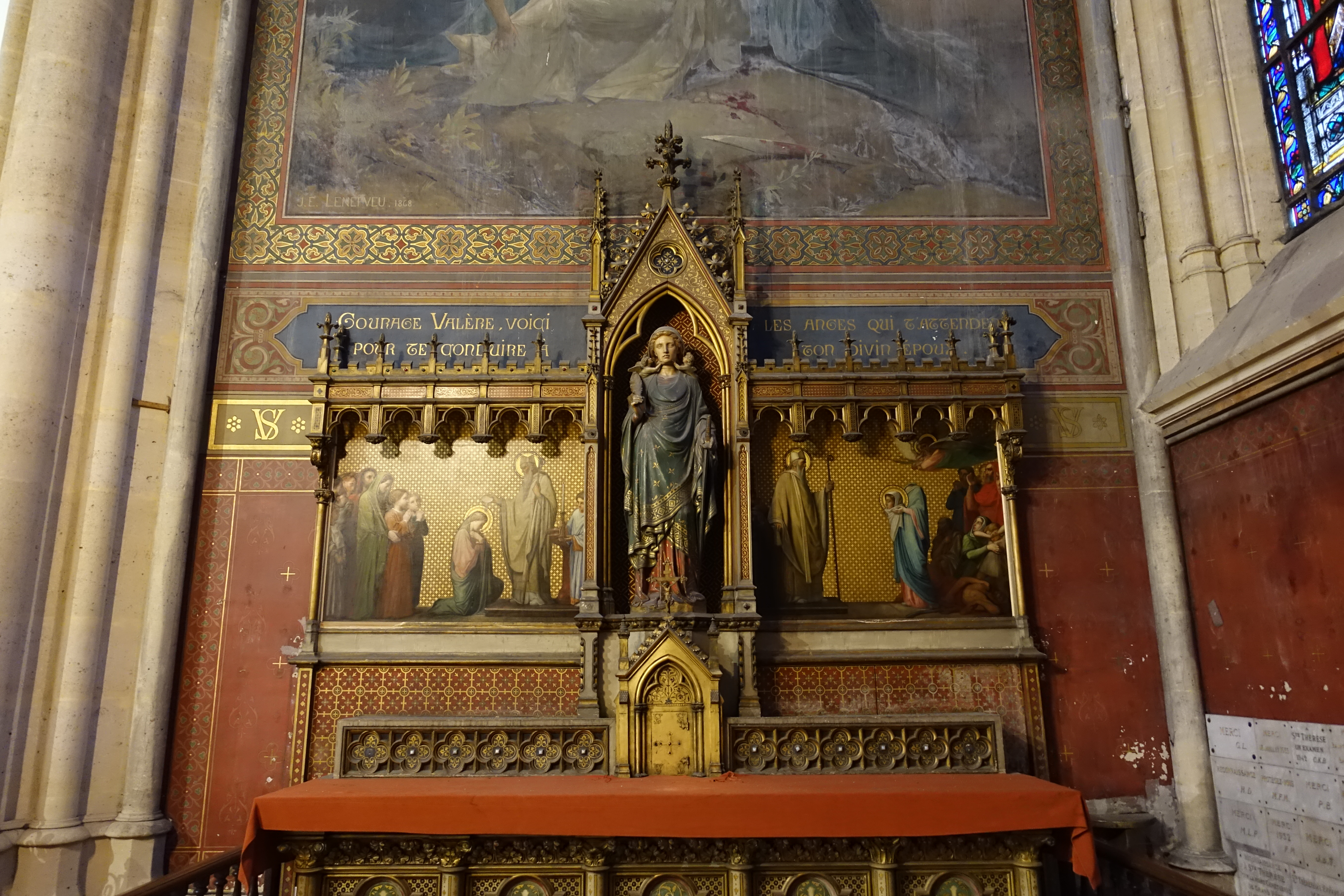
Chapel of Saint Valere

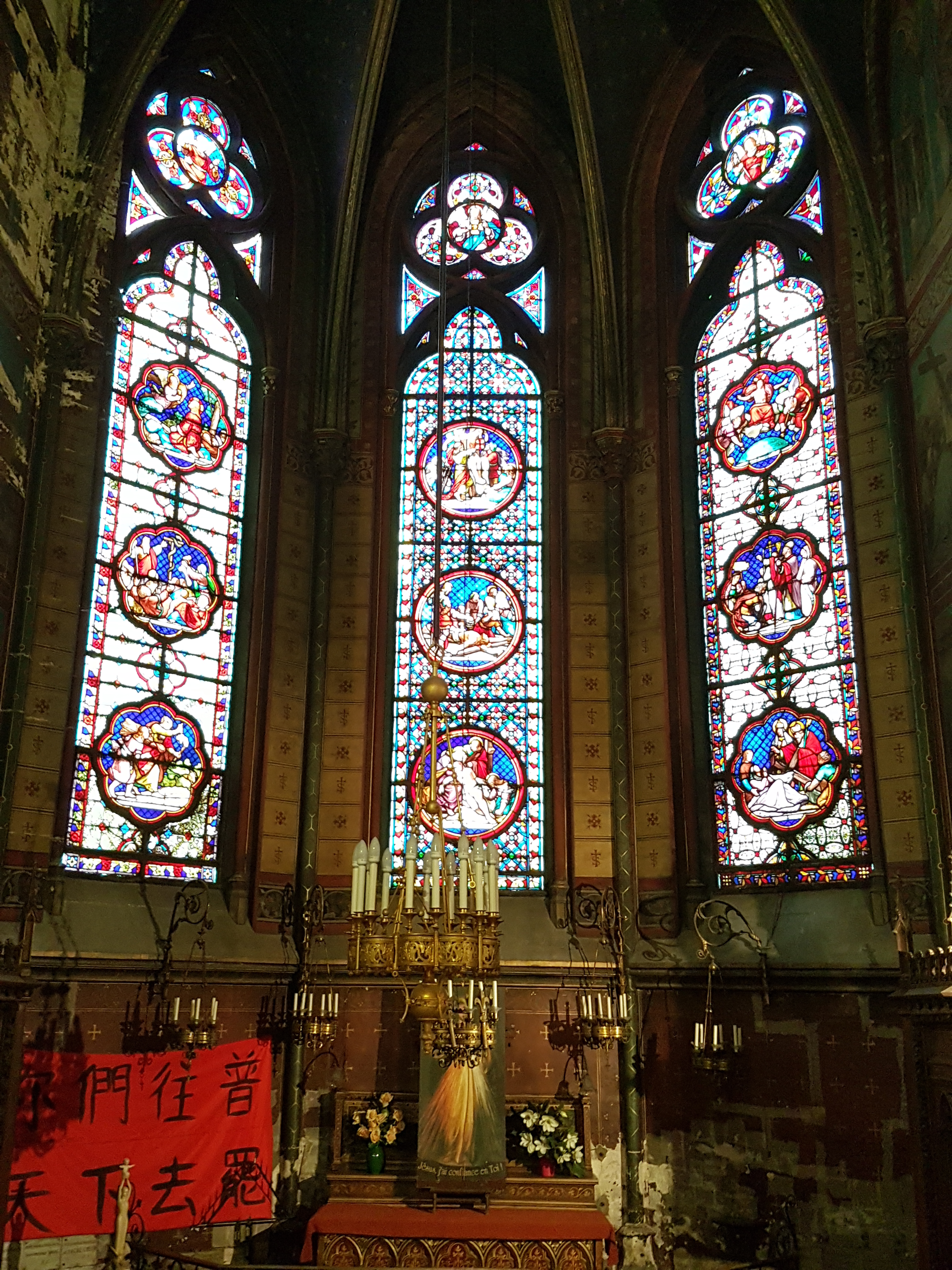
Chapel of the Holy Cross, with Chinese banners

The apse of the church, behind the altar, features five chapels, accessed from the ambulatory. The most important, in the centre, is the Chapel of the Virgin. The others are dedicated to Saint Joseph, Saint Remi, Saint Louis, and the Holy Cross. The decoration of the Chapel of the Holy Cross includes red banners with Chinese characters, a reminder that the design of Saint-Clotilde was the model for the Sacred Heart Cathedral in Guangzhou, China.

There are two other chapels facing each other on different sides of the choir; the Chapel of Saint Clotilde on one side and the Chapel of Saint Valere on the other.

== Art and Decoration ==
The artwork and decoration of the church was designed to recreate the spirit of a medieval Gothic cathedral. The art and decoration of Saint-Clotilde, like other Paris churches of the time, was commissioned and funded by the Paris prefecture of the French government. Competitions were announced, artists submitted sketches of their projects, and the winners were selected by the Commission of Fine Arts of the Paris prefecture. The result was fewer examples of originality or stylistic innovation, but a very high level of artistic quality and craftsmanship.

The interior features works of several of the most prominent Paris artists of the mid-19th century. It presents stained glass windows by Thibaut, paintings by Jules Eugène Lenepveu, sculptures by James Pradier and Francisque Joseph Duret. A series of sculptures by Jean-Baptiste Claude Eugène Guillaume representing the conversion of Valerie of Limoges, her condemnation to death, decapitation and the appearance of Saint Martial.

=== Paintings and frescoes ===
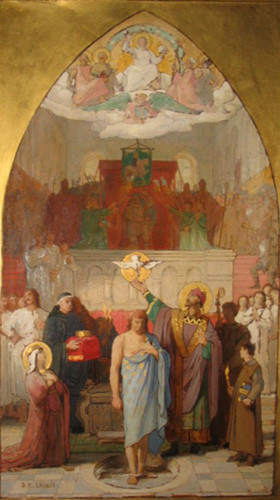
Study for the fresco of "The Baptism of Clovis" by Désiré François Laugée

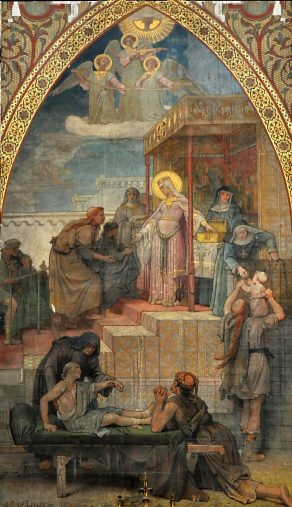
Fresco of "Sainte-Clotilde aiding the poor" by Désiré François Laugée

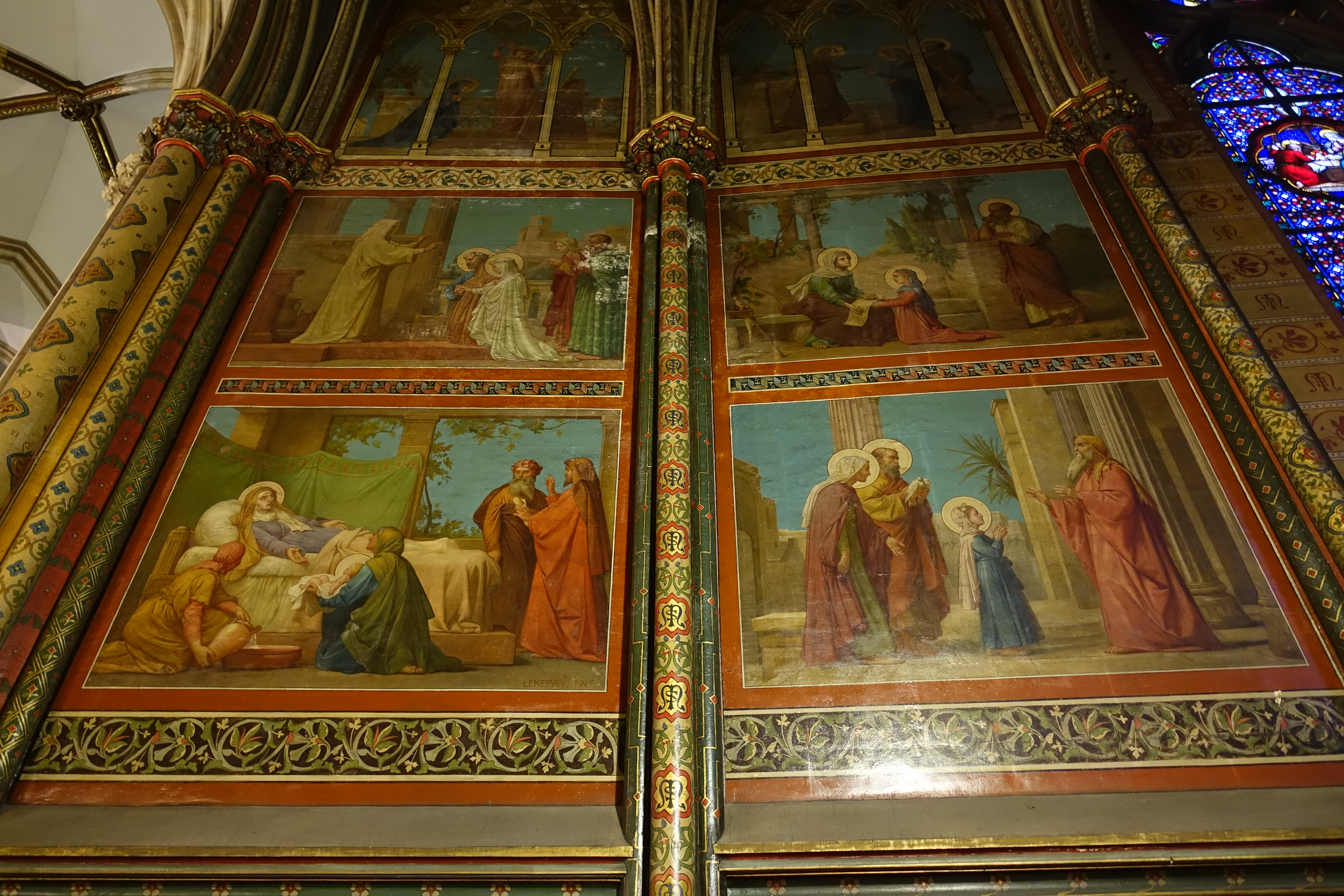
Fresco of scenes from the life of the Virgin Mary by Lenepveu in the Chapel of the Virgin (Second half of 19th century)

=== Sculpture ===
Both the exterior and interior featured very fine sculpture inspired by the sculpture of Gothic cathedrals. The architects François-Chrétien Gau and then Théodore Ballu recreated the Gothic style of the 14th century. They were particularly inspired by the decoration of the Saint-Ouen Abbey, Rouen.

The exception to the Gothic revival sculpture is the series of seven bas-reliefs on the left aisle of the church, "Stations of the Cross", by James Pradier These were created by James Pradier (1792-1852), one of the most prominent French sculoptors of the 19th century. The works of Pradier include the figures of "Fame" in the spandrels of the Arc de Triomphe, decorative figures at the Madeleine, and twelve "Victories" around the tomb of Napoleon inside the dome of the Invalides. While the other decoration of the interior is neo-Gothic, Pradier refused to compromise and his bas-relefs are in his own distinctive neo-classical style. After his death, those on the right aisle were made by his pupil Francisque-Joseph Duret (1804-1865) following the style of Pradier.

Following the Gothic tradition, some of the sculpture, like "Sainte Clothilde", (1854), was made of stone painted and gilded, with the addition of enamel and glass. It was made by sculptor Eugène Guillaume and painter Alexandre Denuelle.

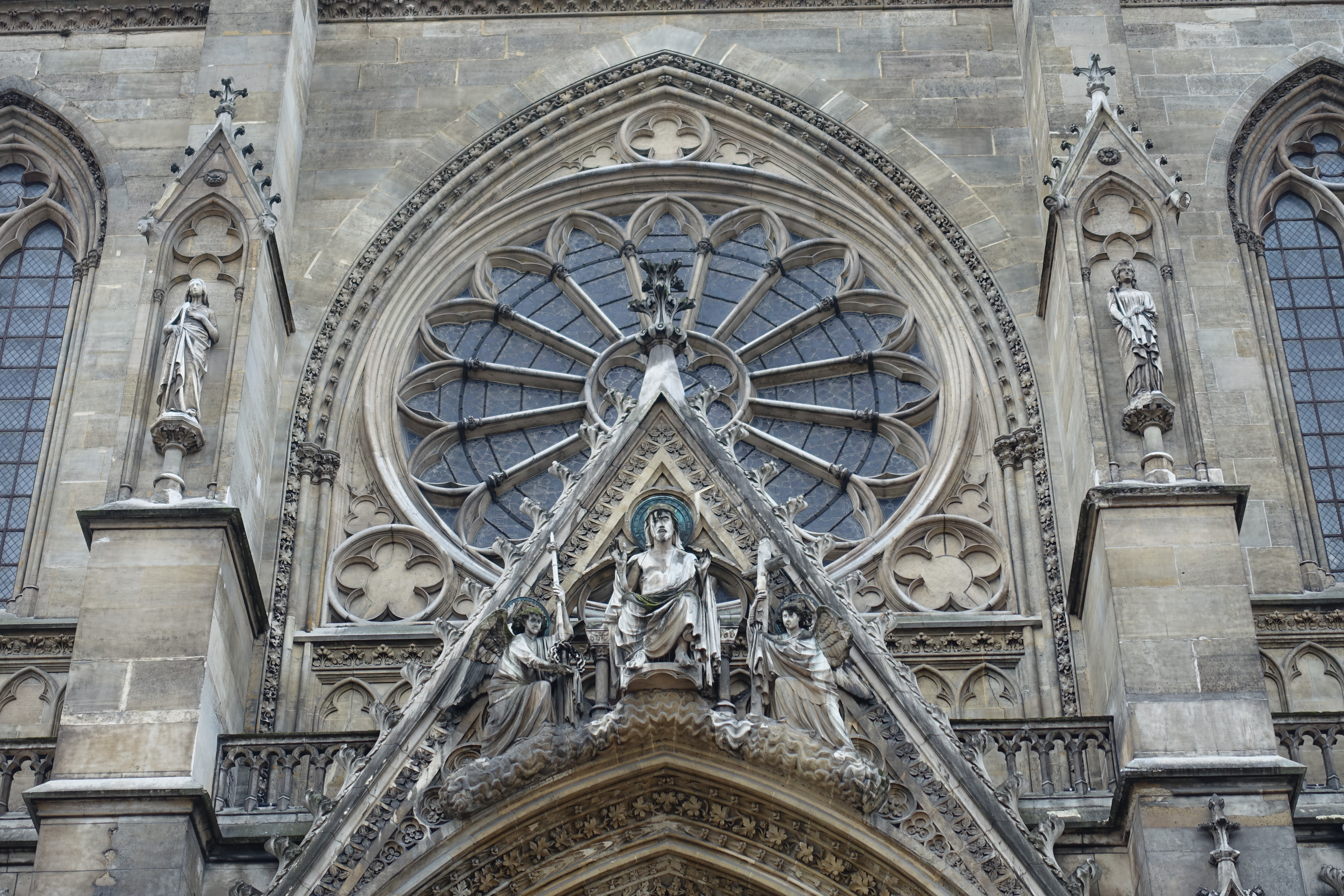
Portals and sculpture of Christ showing his wounds (center) include on west front

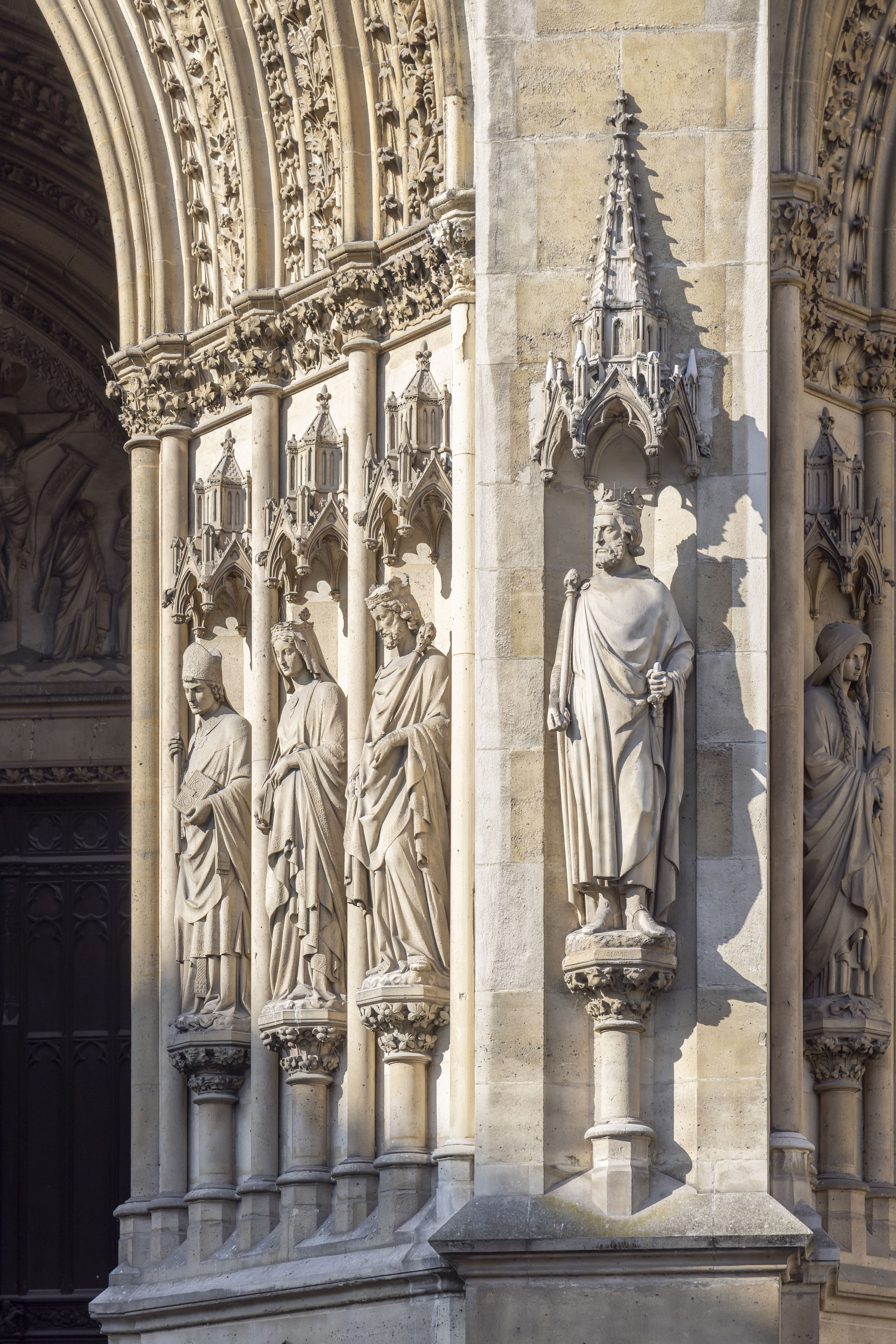
Main portal statues

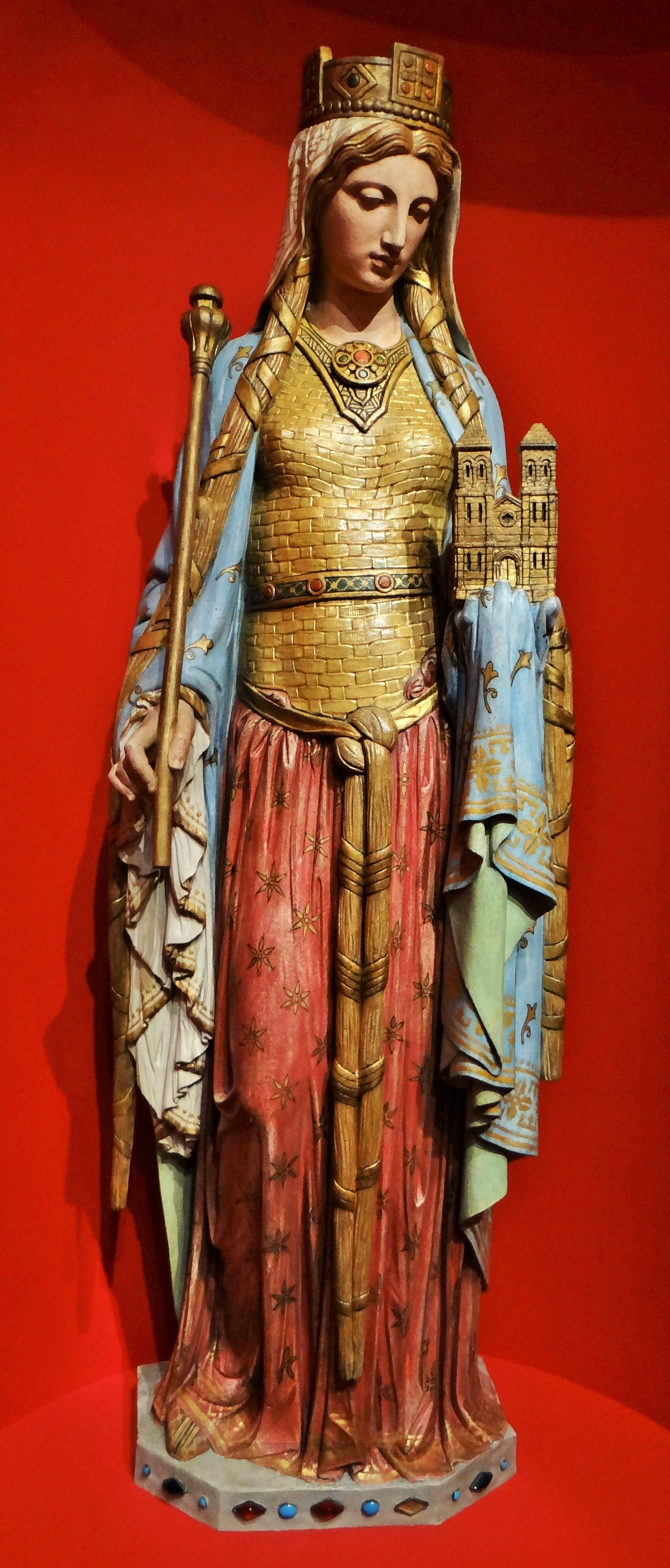
Saint Clothilde (1854)

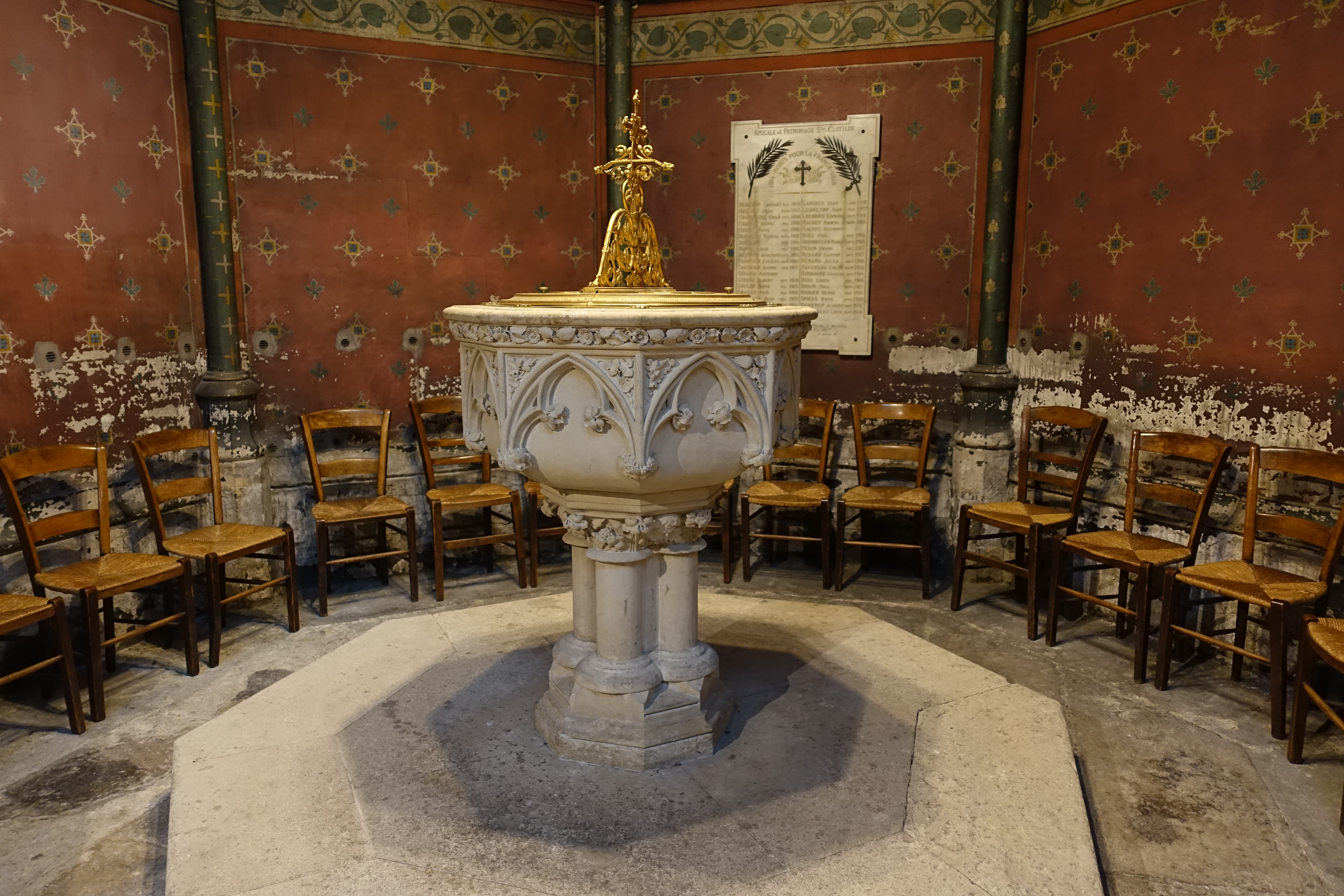
Baptismal Font

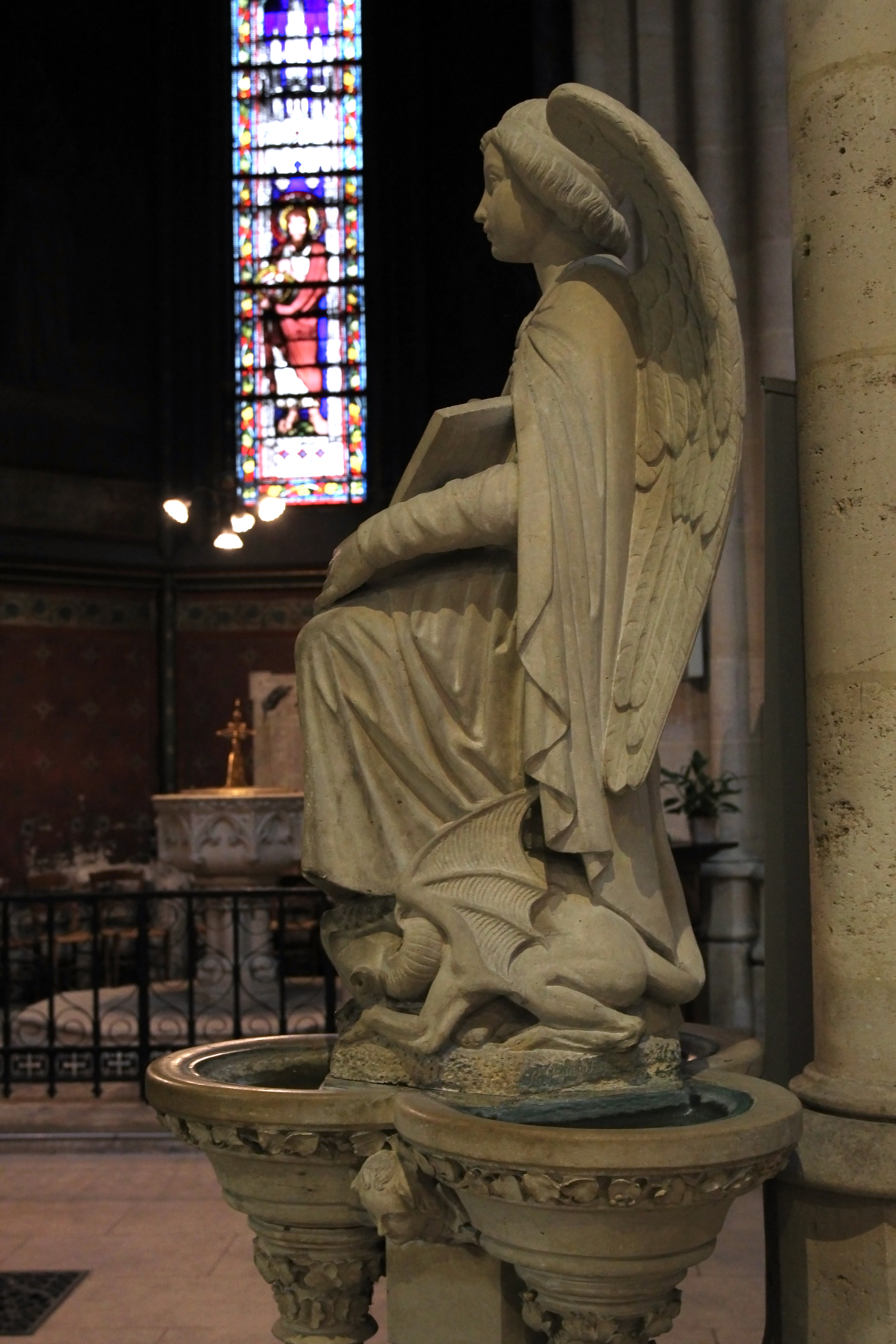
Angel on benitier, or holy water vessel, by Théodore Lechesne

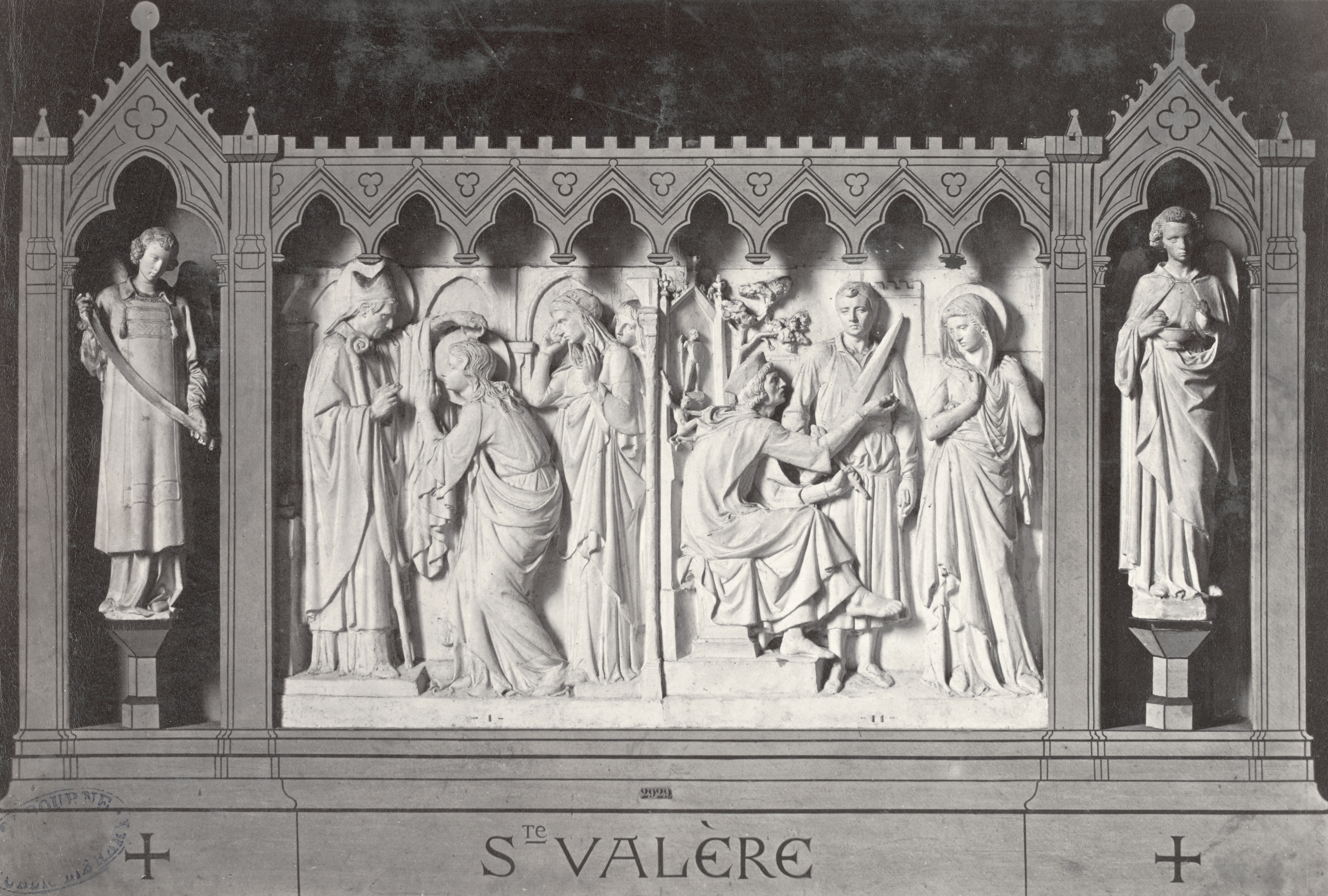
Altar sculpture in Chapel of Saint Valere

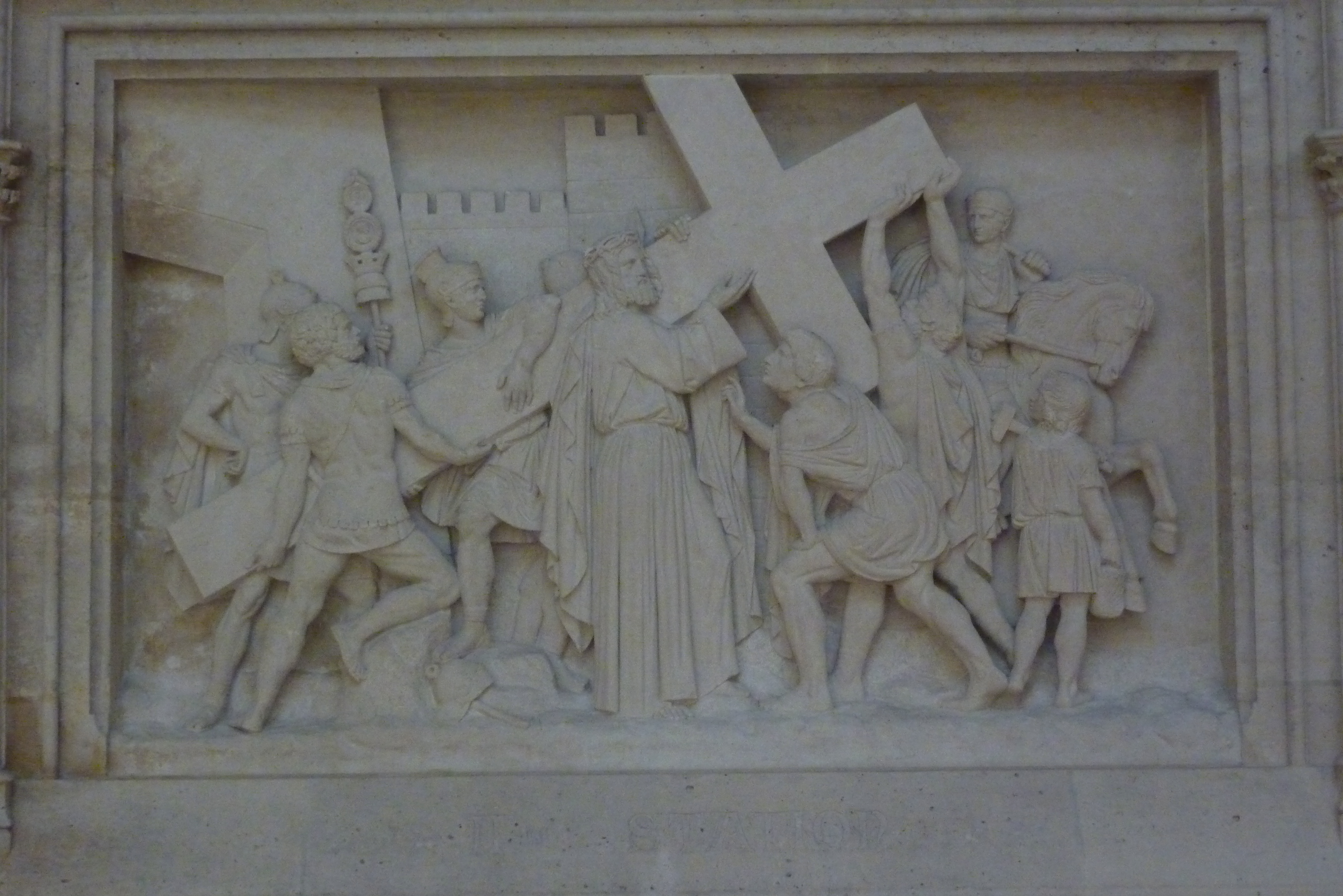
"Stations of the Cross - Christ sets out with the cross" by James Pradier

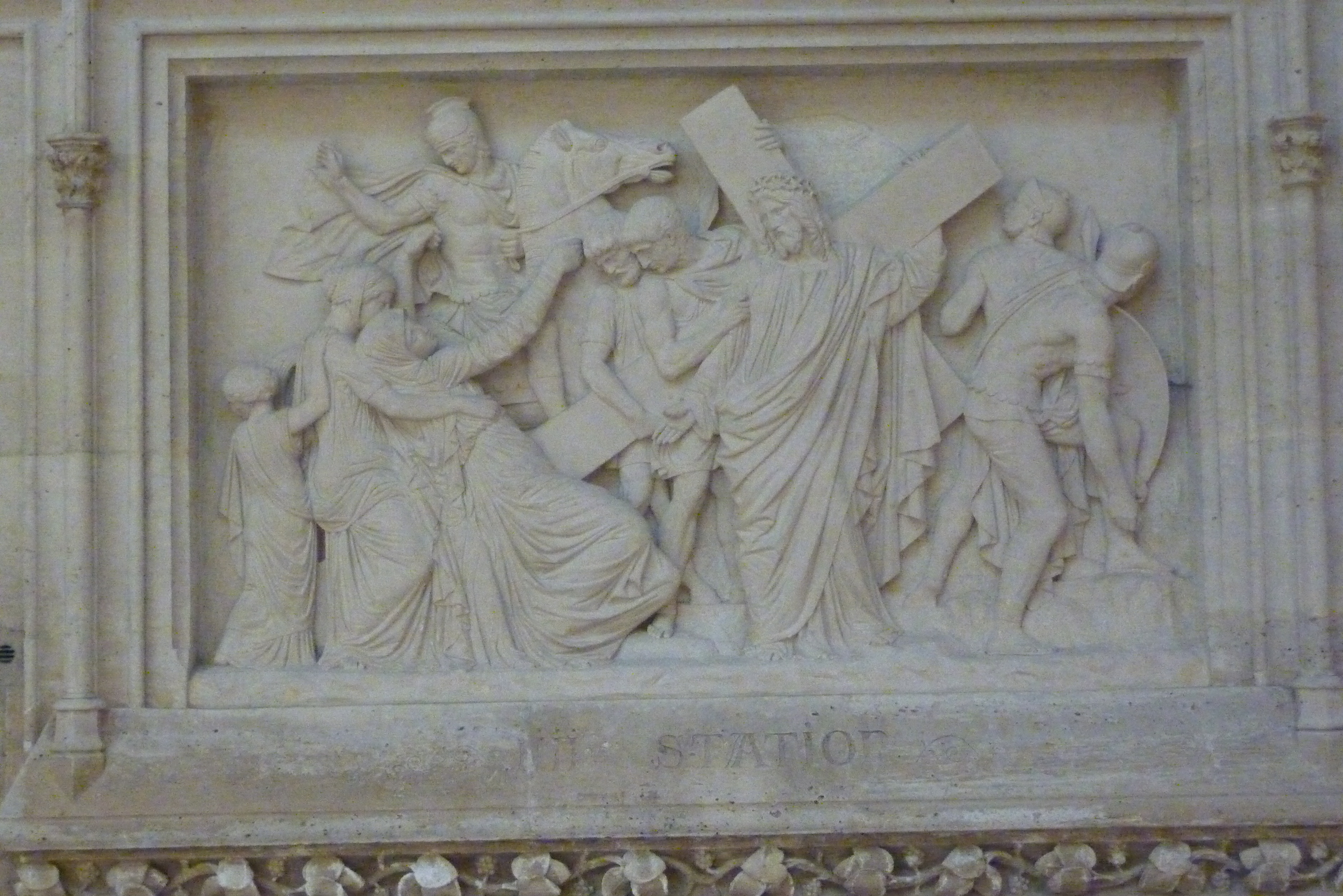
From the Neoclassical "Stations of the Cross" Christ encounters the Virgin Mary, by James Pradier.

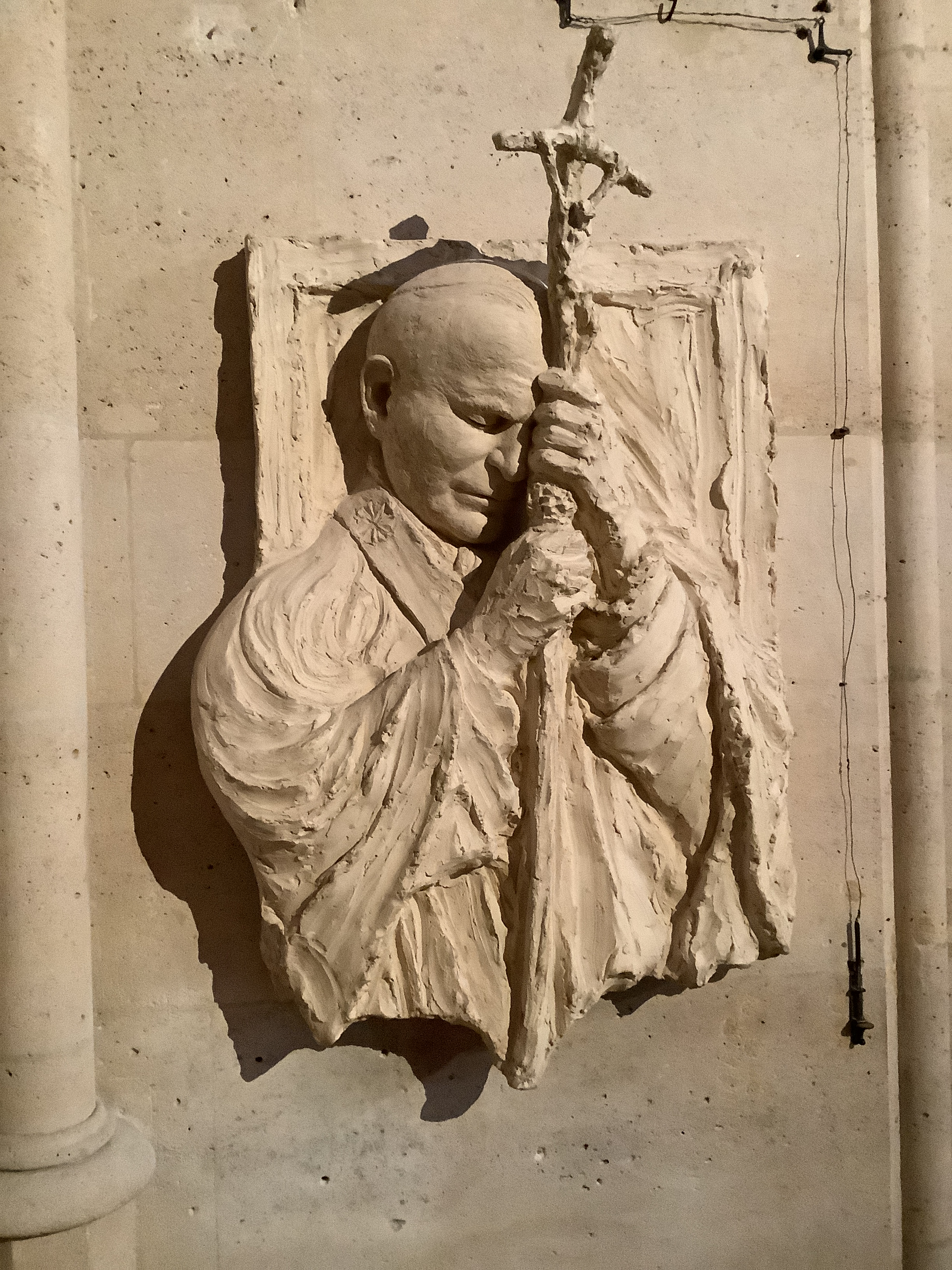
Sculpture of Pope Jean-Paul II

=== Wood Carving ===
The wood carving of the choir stalls and the pulpit, like the other decoration of the church, was designed to capture the spirit of the Gothic art of the 14th century. They were designed by Theodore Ballu.

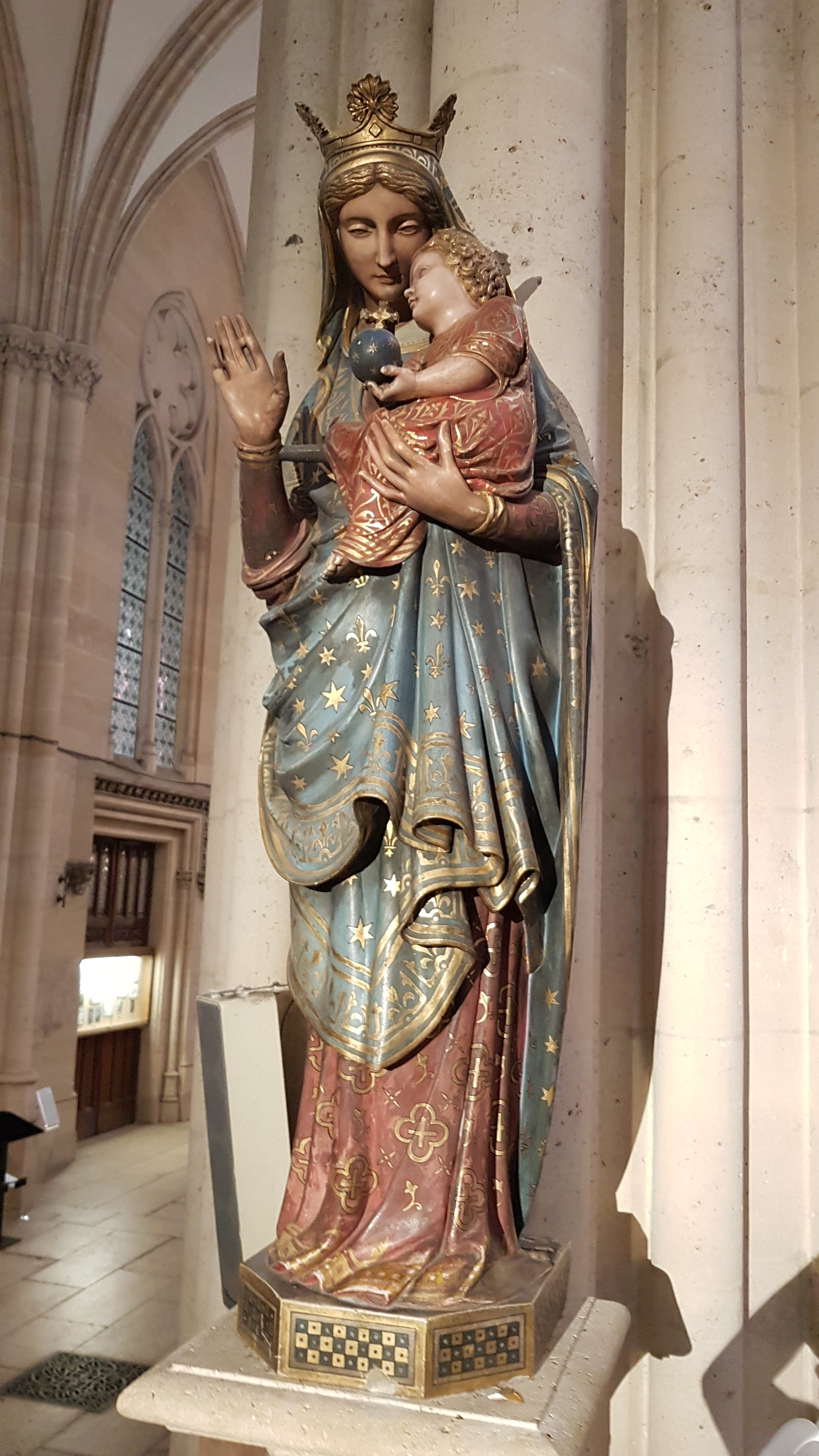
"Virgin and Child", in the Chapel of the Virgin, by Henri Joseph de Triqueti (1804-1874)

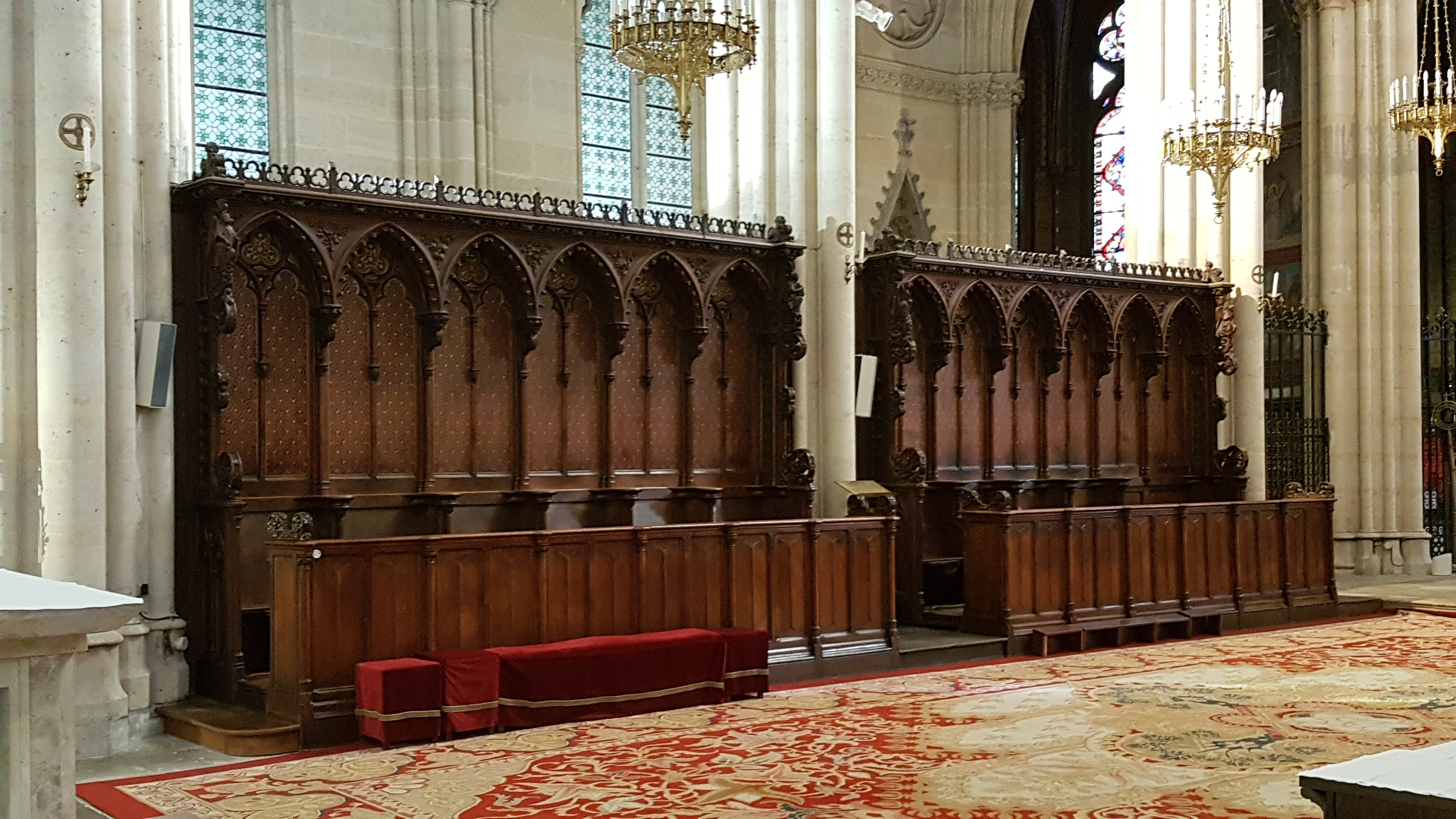
The carved choir stalls

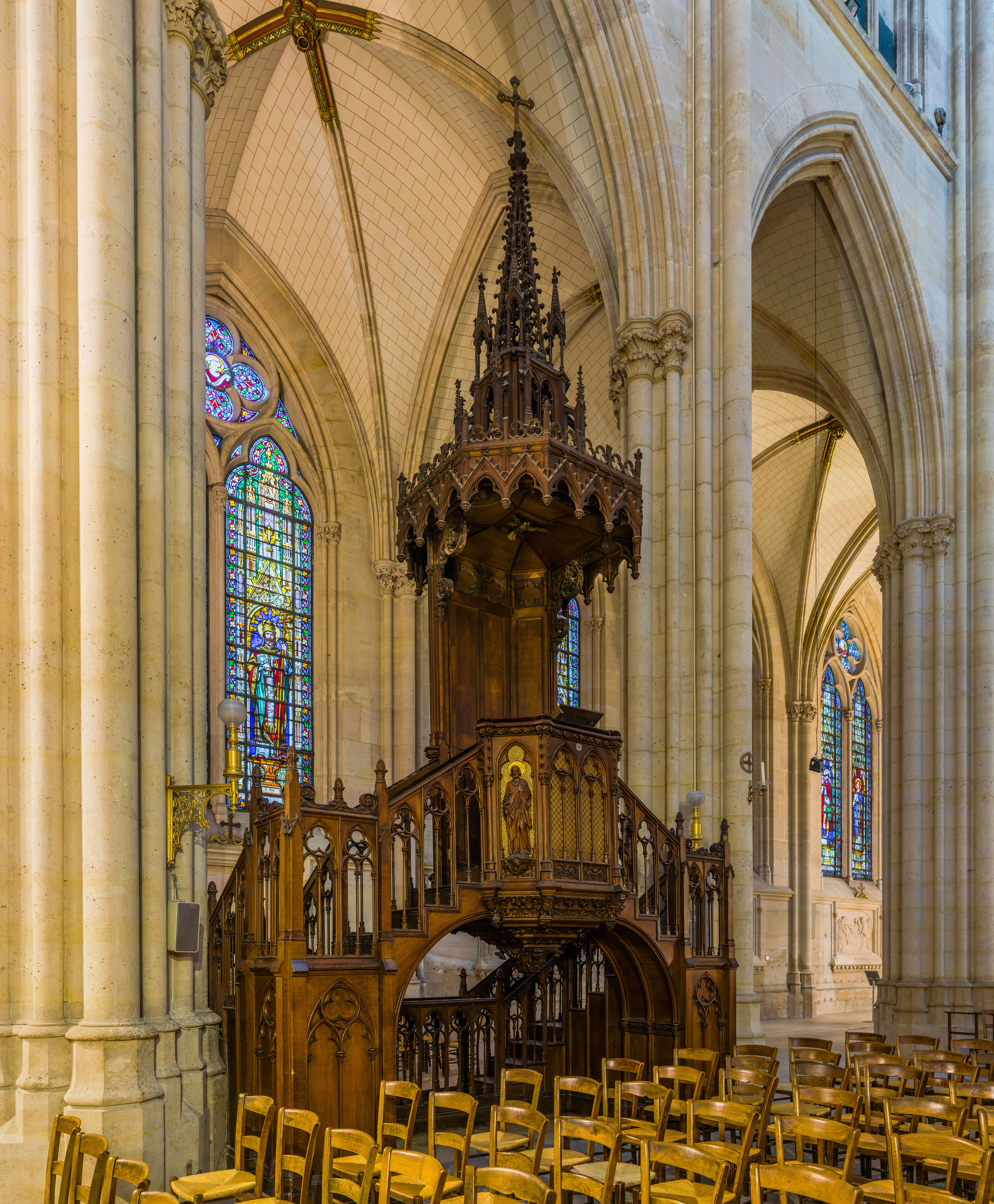
The carved pulpit in the nave

=== Stained glass ===
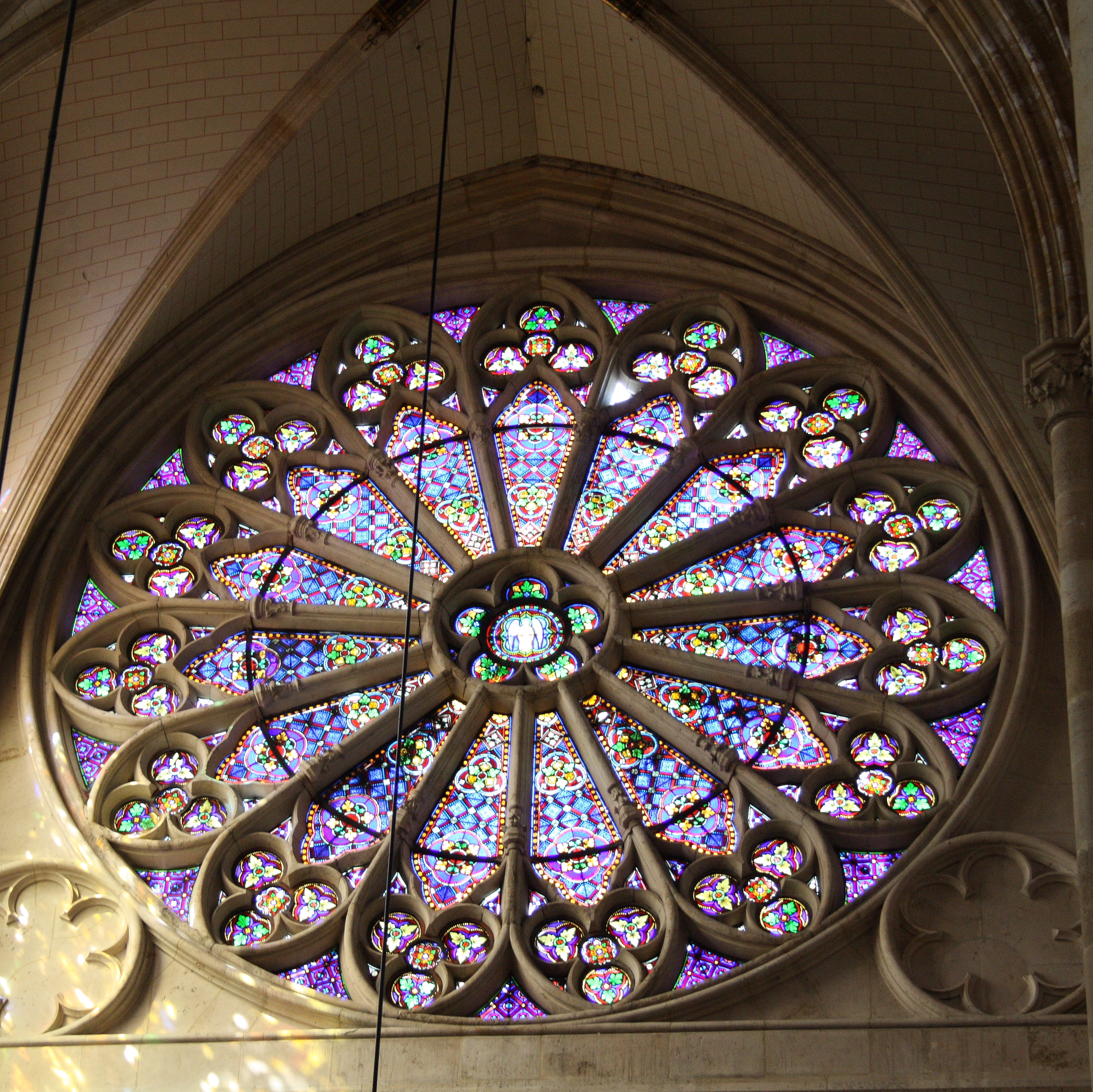
Rose window in the left transept, created by Émile Thibaut.

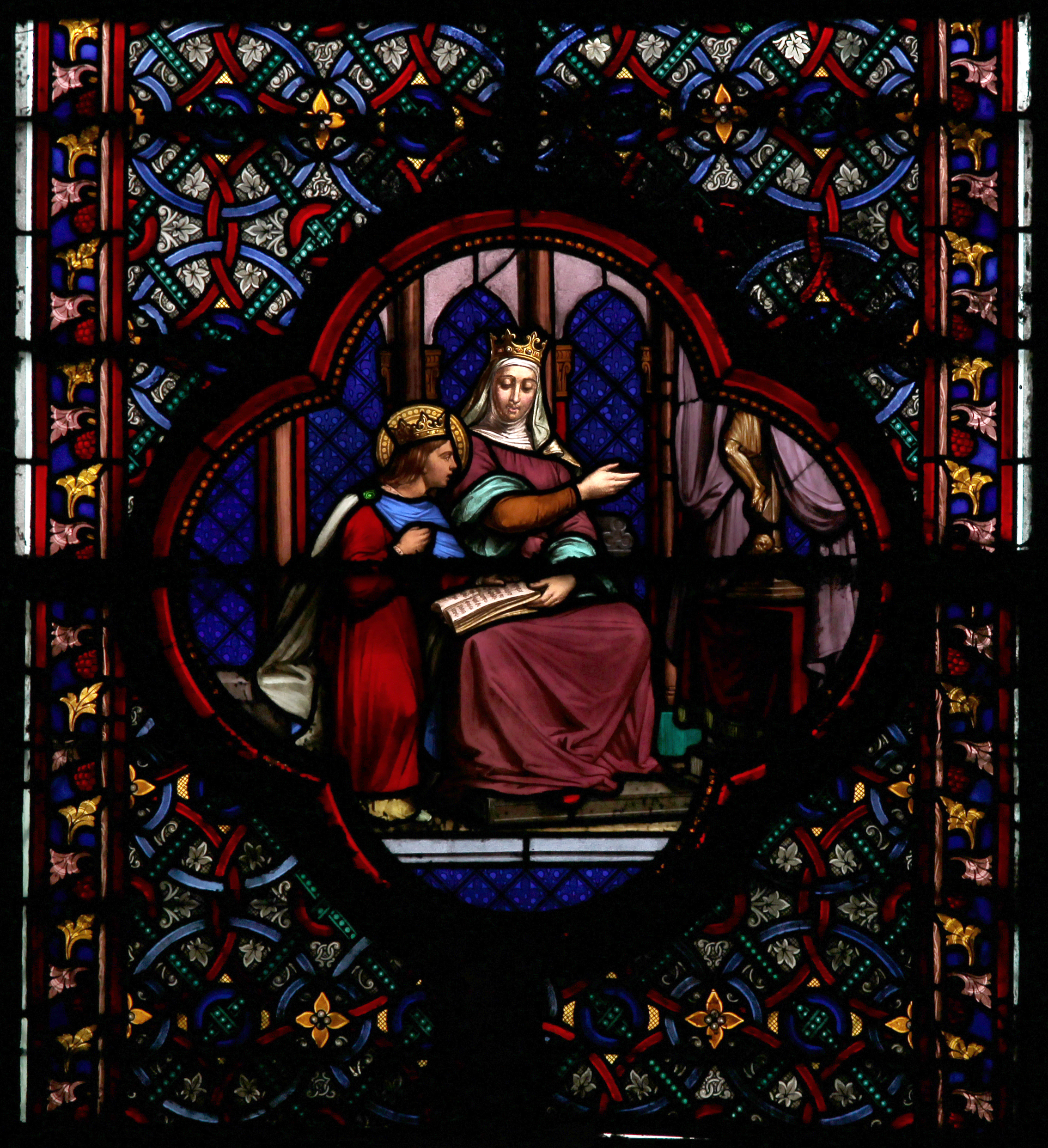
Blanche de Castille teaching future King Louis IX

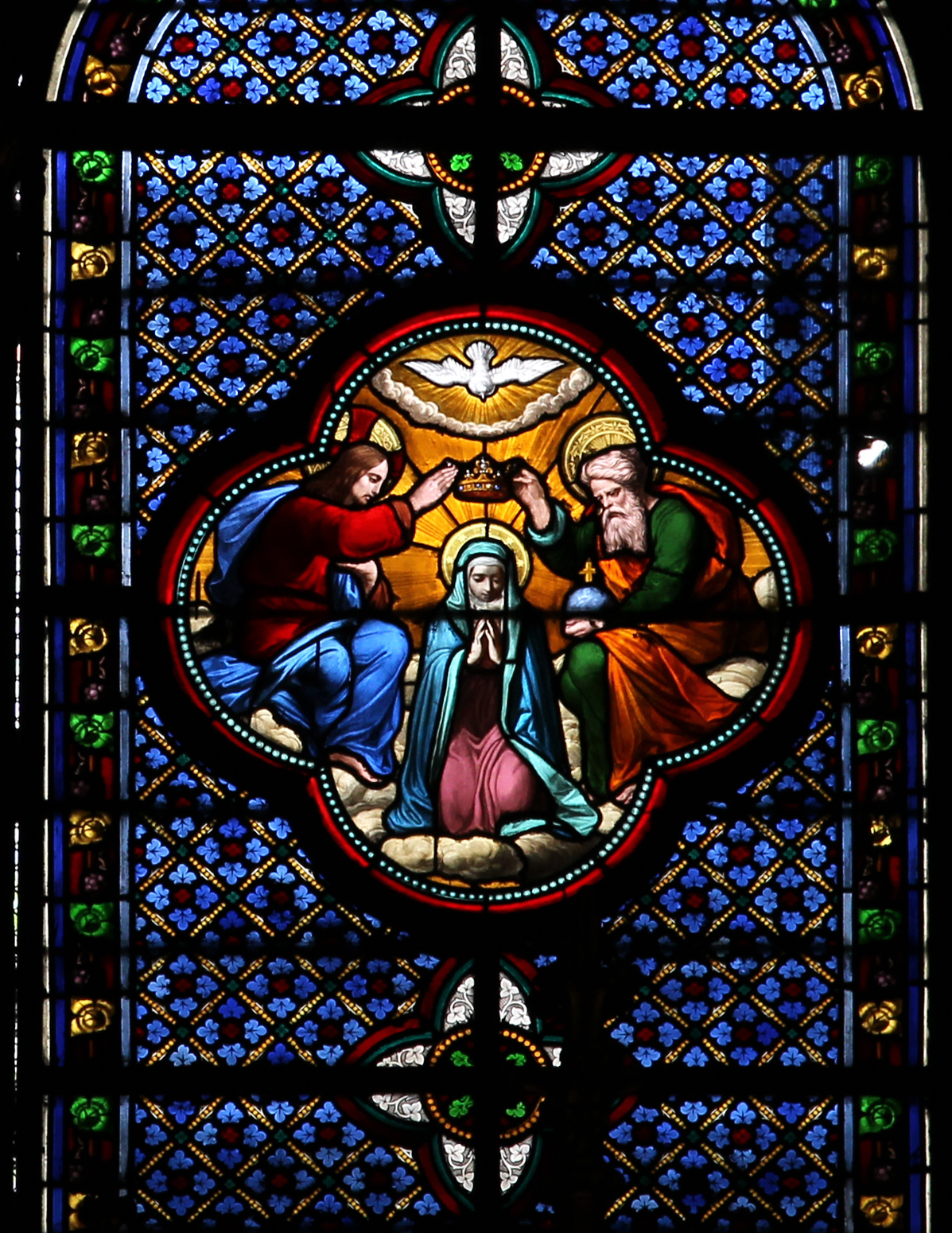
Crowning of the Virgin Mary

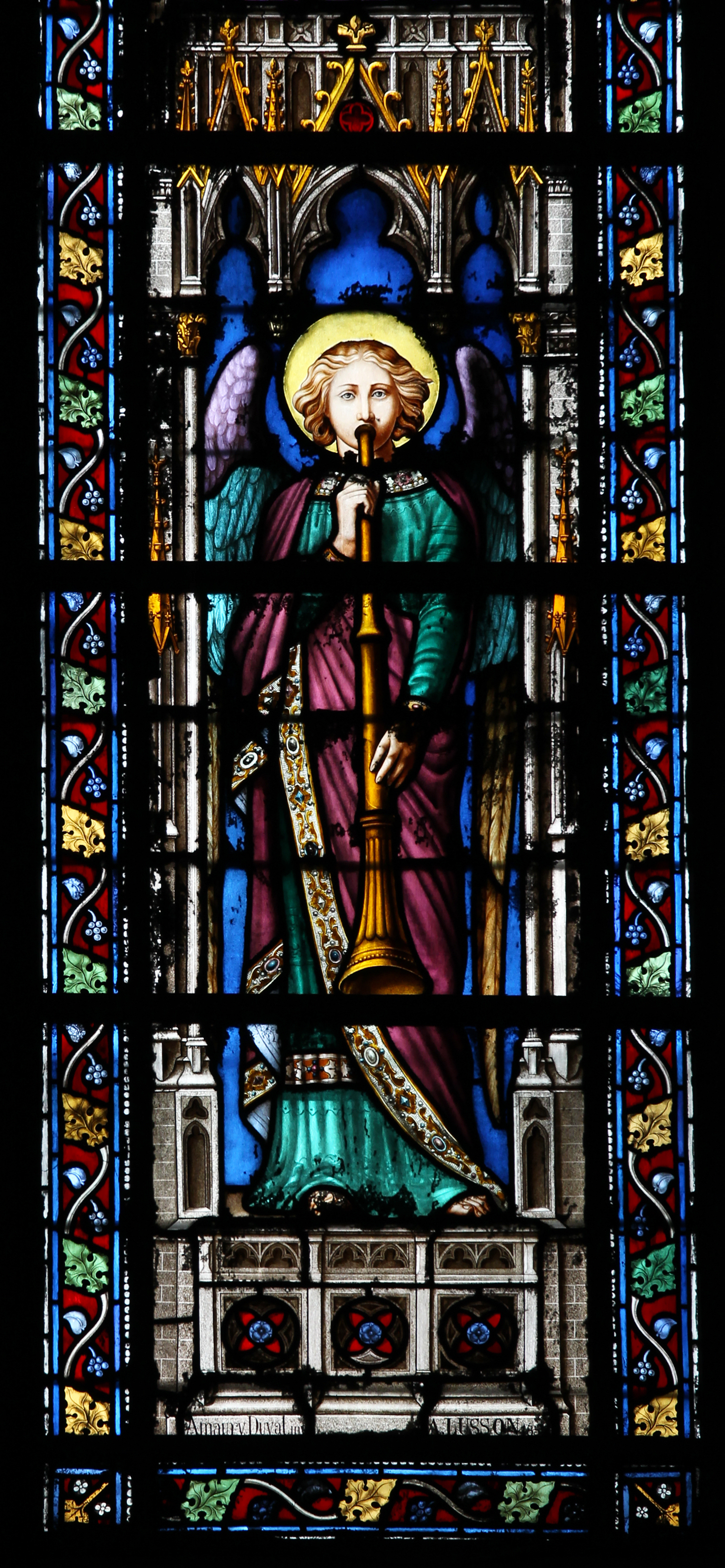
An angel musician by Duval and Lusson

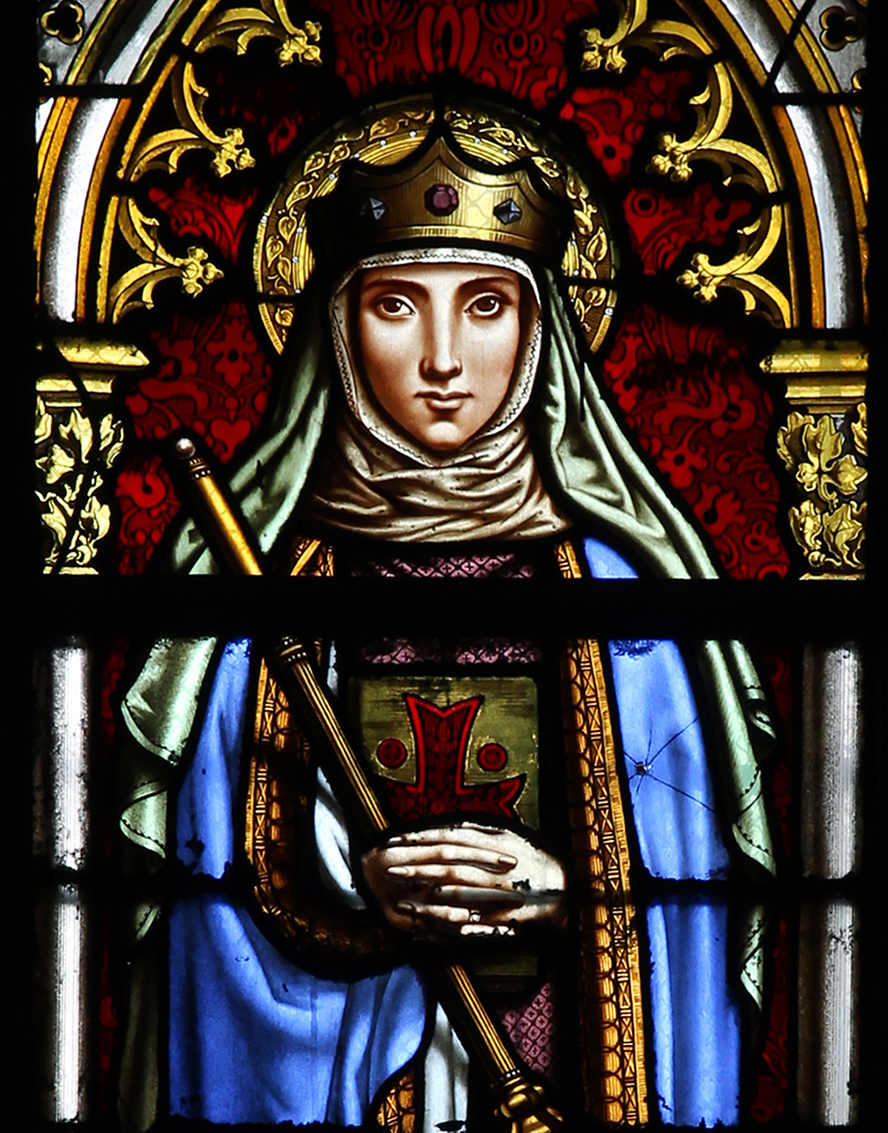
Saint Radegonde, by Duval and Lusson

The stained glass of the church, like the other decoration, was commissioned and designed by capture the spirit of a 14th-century Gothic church. While they used medieval subjects, the glass artists used more modern techniques to paint on the glass with enamel pigments,which were then fired to fuse with the glass. This allowed the artists to create windows which resembled paintings, with greater realism and three-dimensional effects.

Many of the windows were created by the collaboration of artist d'Amaury Duval, and master glass maker Antoine Lusson (fils).

== The Rectors and Vicars of Sainte-Clotilde ==
Abbot Arthur Mugnier, nicknamed the "confessor of the duchesses," and who left a diary, was one of the vicars.

Abbé Henri Chaumont, vicar of the parish from 1869 to 1874, in 1872 with Caroline Carré de Malberg founded the Society of the Daughters of Saint Francis de Sales, whose mother-house moved to Lorry-lès-Metz.

Abbé Albert Colombel was first vicar in 1914.

Abbé Bernard Bouveresse, a member of the Resistance, was parish priest and rector of Sainte-Clotilde from the post-war period to his death.

In 1993, the rector of Sainte-Clotilde, the abbot Alain Maillard de La Morandais was appointed chaplain of the parliamentarians.

In 1992, Cardinal Jean-Marie Lustiger, Archbishop of Paris, created the Pastoral Service for Political Studies. In 1995, he entrusted the direction to Father Antoine de Vial, who received the Pontifical Prelature in 2001.

From 2005 to 2012, Father Matthieu Rougé held both positions.

In September 2012, Father Laurent Stalla-Bourdillon, former vicar of the church of Saint-Germain-des-Prés, was appointed rector of the Sainte-Clotilde church and director of SPEP.

== Organ ==
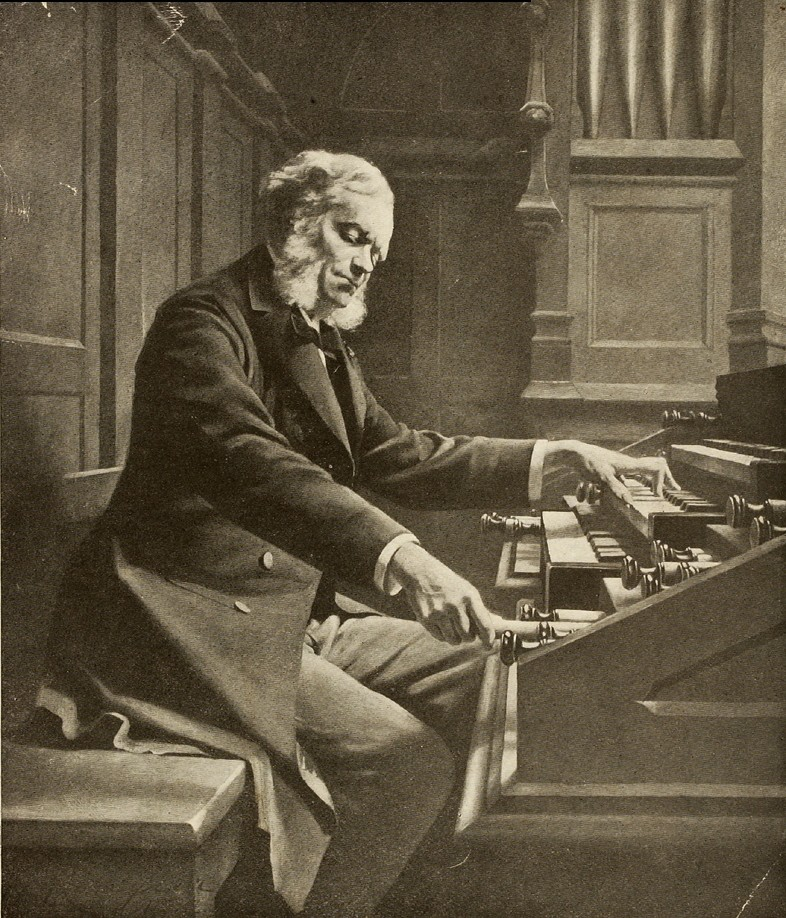
Cesar Franck (1885), painted by Jeanne Rongier

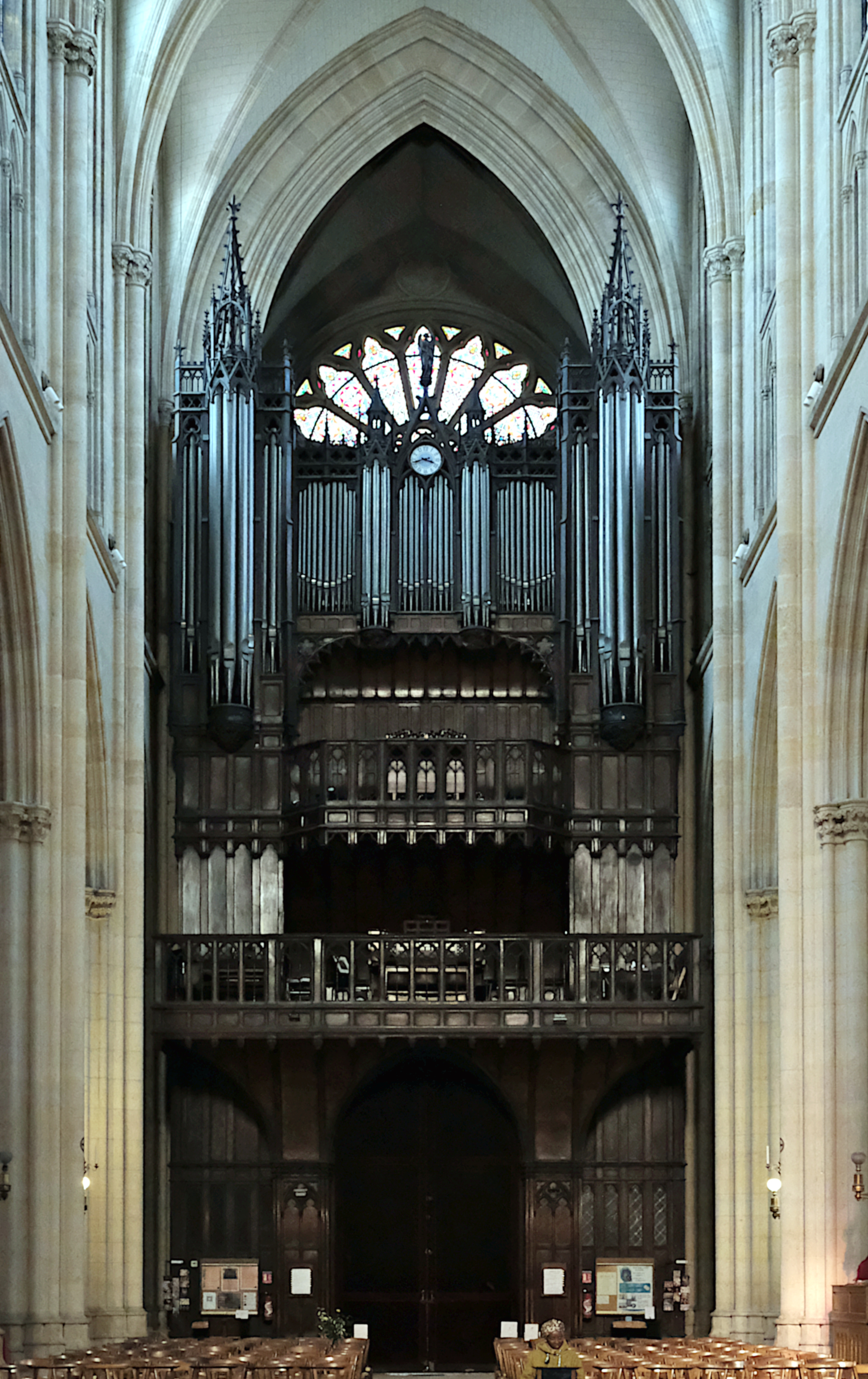
Grand organ of Sainte-Clotilde, made by Aristide Cavaillé-Coll (1859)

St Clotilde is famous for the Aristide Cavaillé-Coll organ (1859, enlarged 1933 and electrified 1962) played by César Franck between 1859 and 1890, and then by the succession of famous composers who have been Organiste titulaire: Franck himself told the curé of Sainte-Clotilde: "If you only knew how I love this instrument . . . it is so supple beneath my fingers and so obedient to all my thoughts!". Franck's organ concerts were attended by Franz Liszt and other composers, and had an important influence on the development of church organ music in Europe.

- César Franck 1859–1890
- Gabriel Pierné 1890–1898
- Charles Tournemire 1898–1939
- Joseph-Ermend Bonnal 1942–1944
- Jean Langlais 1945–1988
- Pierre Cogen and Jacques Taddei 1987–1993
- Jacques Taddei 1993–2004
- Olivier Penin and Jacques Taddei 2004-2012
- Olivier Penin 2012–

In addition to these titular organists, Théodore Dubois served Sainte-Clotilde as choir organist from 1858 and as choirmaster from 1863 until his appointment as organist at the Madeleine in 1869.

== Bibliography (in French) ==
- Dumoulin, Aline; Ardisson, Alexandra; Maingard, Jérôme; Antonello, Murielle; Églises de Paris (2017), Éditions Massin, Issy-Les-Moulineaux, ISBN 978-2-7072-0683-1 (in French)

== See also ==
- List of historic churches in Paris
- Sacred Heart Cathedral of Guangzhou, the facade of which was based on the Basilica of St. Clotilde
- List of works by James Pradier Stations of the Cross
