= Reville =

Reville or Réville may refer to:

== Places ==
- Réville, a commune in the Manche department in Normandy in northwestern France
- Réville-aux-Bois, a commune in the Meuse department in Lorraine in north-eastern France

== French surname ==
- Albert Réville (1826–1906), French Protestant theologian
- Jean Réville (1854–1908), French Protestant theologian, son of the above
- Albert Réville (politician) (1883–1949), French politician

== English surname ==
- Alma Reville (1899–1982), Lady Hitchcock
- David Reville (born 1943), Canadian politician
- Paul Reville, American educator and politician
- Peter Reville (1904–1970), Aussie rules footballer
- Stephen Reville (1844–1916), Australian Catholic bishop

== See also ==
- Revill (surname)
- Reveille (disambiguation)
