= Thérèse-Marthe-Françoise Dupré =

French painter (1877–1920)

- Born: 19 March 1877; Paris
- Died: 13 April 1920 (aged 43); Orly
- Occupation: Painter
- Spouse: Edmond Cotard (m.1898– )
- Children: (2)
- Parents: Julien Dupré (father); Marie Laugée (mother)

Thérèse-Marthe-Françoise Dupré (French pronunciation: [teʁɛz maʁt fʁɑ̃swaz dypʁe]; 1877 – 1920) was a French realist painter.

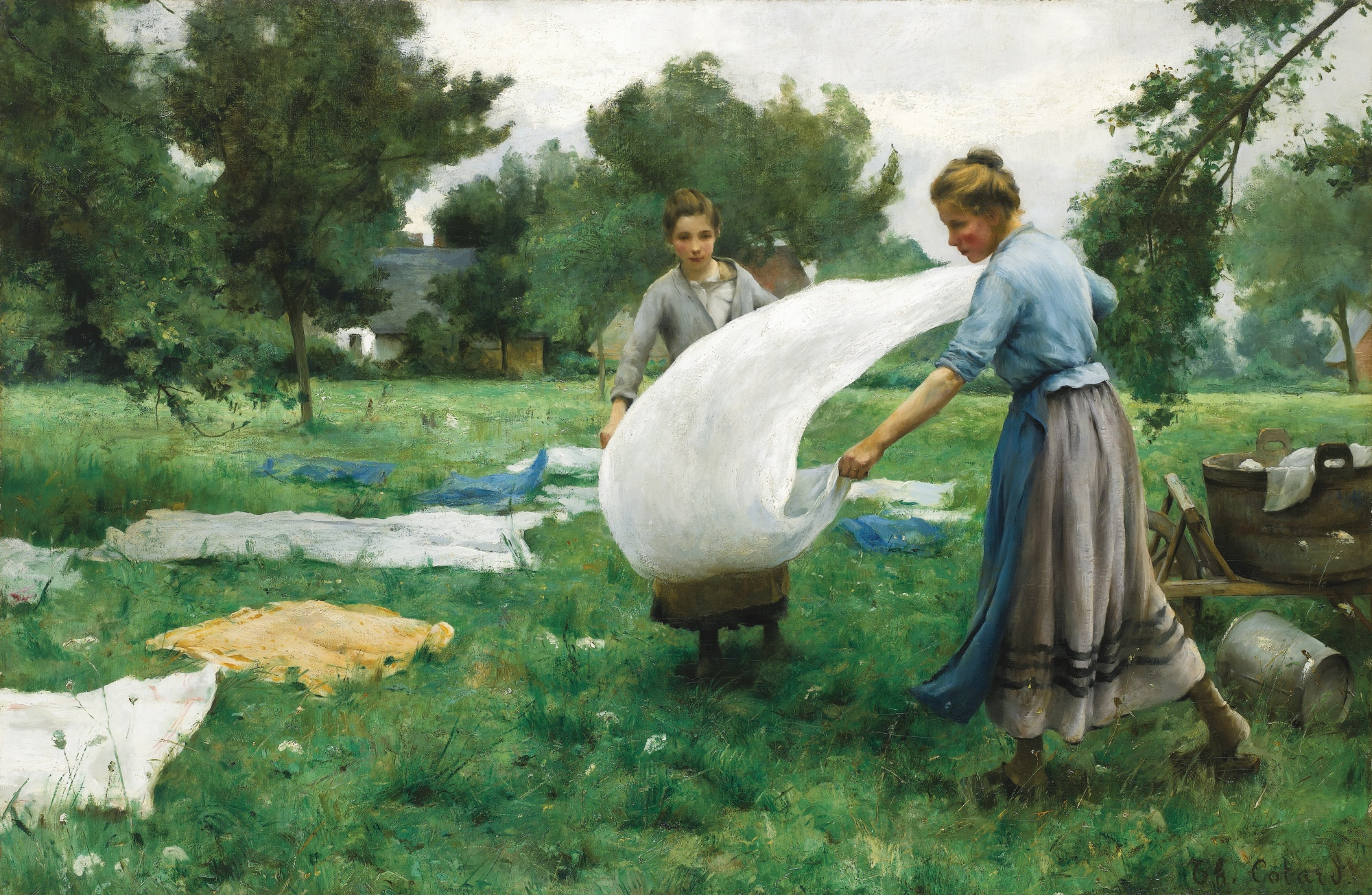
La Lessive

Thérèse was born in Paris to the naturalist painter Julien Dupré and painter Marie Laugée, daughter of the painter Désiré François Laugée . She learned to paint from her father. She is known for paintings depicting working women in the manner of her father and her uncle Georges Paul François Laurent Laugée. She married Edmond Cotard in 1898. They had two sons: Henri Edmond Cotard (b.1899), a painter, and François Cotard (b.1905), an engraver and an artist. She became a member of the Salon des Artistes Français in 1907. Her painting La Lessive was on show at the Paris Salon in 1910.
