= 1901 Nobel Prize in Literature =

- Sully Prudhomme
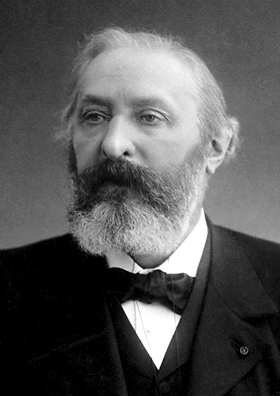
- "in special recognition of his poetic composition, which gives evidence of lofty idealism, artistic perfection and a rare combination of the qualities of both heart and intellect."
- Date: 14 November 1901 (announcement); 10 December 1901 (ceremony)
- Location: Stockholm, Sweden
- Presented by: Swedish Academy
- First award: 1901
- Website: Official website

The 1901 Nobel Prize in Literature was the first awarded Nobel Prize in Literature. It was awarded to the French poet Sully Prudhomme (1839–1907) "in special recognition of his poetic composition, which gives evidence of lofty idealism, artistic perfection and a rare combination of the qualities of both heart and intellect."

== Laureate ==
Sully Prudhomme belonged to a school of poets that wanted to write in a classic and formally elegant style. His poetry combined formal perfection with an interest in science and philosophy. According to the Swedish Academy, his elevated poetry fit in Alfred Nobel's formulation about works "in an ideal direction".

== Deliberations ==
=== Nominations ===
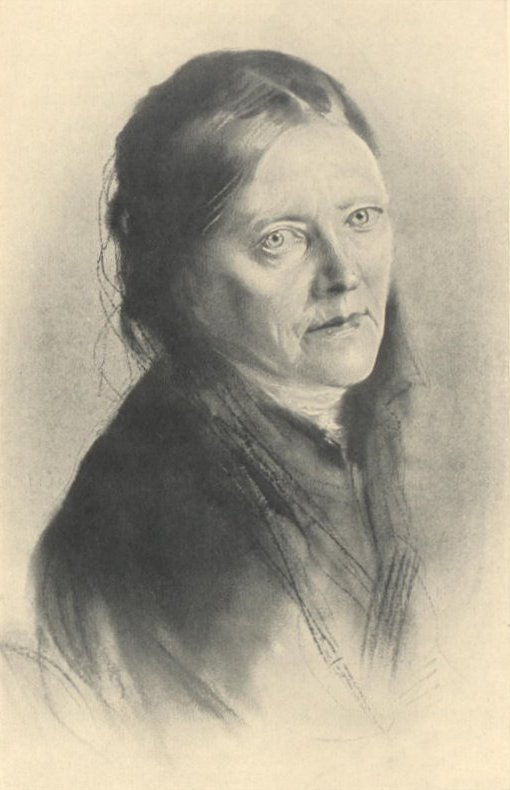
Malwida von Meysenburg was the first woman ever nominated for the Nobel Prize in Literature. She was nominated by French historian Gabriel Monod for her magnum opus Memoirs of an Idealist

Sully Prudhomme was nominated for the prize by 17 members of the Académie Française, of which Sully Prudhomme himself was a member. In total the Nobel committee received 37 nominations for 26 writers including Frédéric Mistral (five nominations) and Henryk Sienkiewicz (three nominations) who were subsequently both awarded the prize, and the only woman nominated, Malwida von Meysenburg. The first name on their list of candidates was Émile Zola, but the campaign from the Académie Française proved to be successful and the Swedish Academy chose to award Sully Prudhomme.

The notable authors R. D. Blackmore, Anne Beale, Victoire Léodile Béra, Stephen Crane, Ernest Dowson, José Maria de Eça de Queiroz, Carit Etlar, Naim Frashëri, Mary Kingsley, Max Müller, Friedrich Nietzsche, Sigbjørn Obstfelder, Pyotr Lavrov, John Ruskin, Henry Sidgwick, Charles Dudley Warner, Oscar Wilde, Vladimir Solovyov and Gheorghe Dem Teodorescu all died in 1900, making them ineligible for the 1901 nominations. The nominated French theologian Louis Sabatier died months before the announcement, and authors Leopoldo Alas, Víctor Balaguer i Cirera, Walter Besant, Ada Christen, Ramón de Campoamor, Luis Mariano de Larra, Kate Greenaway, Julien Leclercq, William Cosmo Monkhouse, Frederic W. H. Myers, Johanna Spyri, Grigore Sturdza, Maurice Thompson, Vasile Alexandrescu Urechia, Brooke Foss Westcott and Charlotte Mary Yonge died in 1901 without having been nominated for the prize.

Official list of nominees and their nominators for the prize
No.	Nominee	Country	Genre(s)	Nominator(s)
1	Alexander Baumgartner (Note: Baumgartner: Geschichte der Weltliteratur ("The History of World Literature", 1897—1901)) (1841–1910)	Switzerland	poetry, history	Knud Karl Krogh-Tonning (1842–1911)
2	Charles Borgeaud (Note: Borgeaud: Histoire de l'Université de Genève. L'académie de Calvin. 1559—1798 ("The History of the Geneva University: Calvin's Academy", 1900)) (1861–1940)	Switzerland	history, law	Wilhelm Oechsli (1851–1919); Antoine Guilland (1861–1931); Paul Seippel (1858–1926)
3	João da Câmara (Note: Câmara: Meia-Noite ("The Midnight", 1900)) (1852–1908)	Portugal	drama, essays	Joaquim José Coelho de Carvalho (1855–1934)
4	Louis Ducros (Note: Ducros: Les Encyclopédistes (Encyclopedists, 1900)) (1846–1927)	France	literary criticism, history	Michel Clerc (1857–1931)
5	Paul Duproix (Note: Duproix: Kant et Fichte et le problème de l´éducation ("Kant, Fichte, and the Problem of Education", 1895)) (1851–1912)	France	pedagogy	Émile Redard (1848–1913)
6	Carl Gustaf Estlander (Note: Estlander: Vitterhetens utveckling hos de nyare folken i medeltiden: förra perioden (Witnesses of the Newer People's Development in the Middle Ages: The Last Period", 1900)) (1834–1910)	Russia (Finland)	history, essay	Johan Gustaf Frosterus (1826–1901)
7	Antonio Fogazzaro (Note: Fogazzaro: Malombra: romanzo ("Malombra: A Novel", 1881), Daniele Cortis (1885), Il mistero del poeta ("The Mystery of the Poet", 1888), and Ascensioni umane ("Human Ascensions", 1899)) (1842–1911)	Italy	novel, poetry, short story	Hans Forssell (1843–1901)
8	Julius Gersdorff (Note: Gersdorff: 600 bis 700 Lieder ("Songs 600-700")) (1849–1907)	Germany	poetry, songwriting	Carl Heinrich Döring (1834–1916)
9	Oscar le Pin (Note: Le Pin: La recherche de l'idéal ("Searching of the Ideal", 1900)) (–)	Switzerland	drama	P. L. Bonnaviat (–)
10	Ossip Lourié (Note: Lourié: La philosophie de Tolstoï ("The Philosophy of Tolstoy", 1899) and La philosophie sociale dans le théâtre d'Ibsen ("The Social Philosophy of Ibsen's Theatre", 1900)) (1868–1955)	France	history, philosophy, essays	Kristian Birch-Reichenwald Aars (1868–1917)
11	Ferenc Kemény (Note: Kemény: Entwurf einer internationalen Gesammt-Academie: Weltakademie ("The Draft of an Total International Academy: World Academy", 1901)) (1860–1944)	Austria–Hungary (Hungary)	essays	Imre Rudolf Pauer (1845–1930)
12	Frédéric Mistral (Note: Mistral: Mirèio and La Respelido (1900).) (1830–1914)	France	poetry, philology	Julius Cornu (1849–1919); Lèon Clédat (1851–1930); Eduard Koschwitz (1851–1904); Jan Urban Jarník (1848–1923); Adolf Mussafia (1835–1905); Karl Vollmöller (1878–1948); Gottfried Baist (1853–1920); Karl Voretzsch (1867–1947); Heinrich Schneegans (1863–1914); Hermann Suchier (1848–1914); Fritz Neumann (1854–1934); Wilhelm Cloetta (1857–1911); Theodor Gartner (1843–1925); Albert Stimming (1846–1922); Hugo Schuchardt (1846–1927); Gustav Gröber (1844–1911); Léopold Eugène Constans (1845–1916); Paul Meyer (1840–1917); Carl Appel (1857–1934); André Dumas (1874–1943); Alfons Kissner (1844–1928); Matthias Friedwagner (1861–1940); Eduard Böhmer (1827–1906); Ernest Mérimée (1846–1924); Eugène Ritter (1836–1928)
13	Gaspar Núñez de Arce (Note: Núñez de Arce: Gritos del combate: Poesías ("Cries of Combat: Poems", 1875), Obras dramáticas ("Dramatic Works", 1879), La selva oscura: Poema ("The Dark Forest: Poem", 1879), and Sursum Corda! ("Ascend the Heart!", 1900)) (1832–1903)	Spain	poetry, drama, law	Mariano Catalina Cobo (1842–1913)
14	Gaston Paris (Note: Paris: La poésie du moyen âge ("The Poetry of the Middle Ages", 1885–95) Discours de réception ("Reception Speech", 1897), Penseurs et poètes ("Thinkers and Poets", 1896), Poèmes et légendes du moyen âge ("Poems and Legends of the Middle Ages", 1900), and François Villon (1901)) (1839–1903)	France	history, poetry, essays	Fredrik Wulff (1845–1930)
15	Sully Prudhomme (Note: Prudhomme: Oeuvres ("Works", 1865–1888), Que sais-je? Examen de conscience ("What Do I Know? Examining Our Conscience", 1896), Testament poétique ("Poetic Testament", 1901.)) (1839–1907)	France	poetry, essay	Per Geijer (1886–1976); Michel Bréal (1832–1915); Gustave Lanson (1857–1934); Henri de Bornier (1825–1901); Gaston Paris (1839–1903); Paul Bourget (1852–1935); Octave Gréard (1828–1904); André Theuriet (1833–1907); Gaston Boissier (1823–1908); Ludovic Halévy (1837–1908); Henry Houssaye (1848–1911); François Coppée (1842–1908); José-Maria de Heredia (1842–1905); Jules Lemaître (1853–1914); Charles de Freycinet (1828–1923); Paul Deschanel (1855–1922); Émile Ollivier (1825–1913); Charles Costa de Beauregard (1835–1909); Émile Faguet (1847–1916); Guillaume Apollinaire (1880–1918)
16	Charles Renouvier (Note: Renouvier: La nouvelle monadologie ("The New Monadology", 1899)) (1815–1903)	France	philosophy	Antoine Benoist (1846–1922)
17	Edmond Rostand (Note: Rostand: Cyrano de Bergerac (1897) and L'Aiglon ("Eaglet, 1900)) (1868–1918)	France	poetry, drama	Gabriel Hanotaux (1853–1944); Paul Hervieu (1857–1915)
18	Auguste Sabatier (Note: A. Sabatier: Esquisse d'une philosophie de la religion d'après la psychologie et l'histoire ("Outlines of a Philosophy of Religion based on Psychology and History", 1897)) (1839–1901)	France	history, essays, theology	Gabriel Monod (1844–1912)
19	Paul Sabatier (Note: P. Sabatier: Vie de S. François d'Assise ("The Life of St. Francis of Assisi", 1894)) (1858–1928)	France	history, theology, biography	Carl Bildt (1850–1931)
20	Henryk Sienkiewicz (Note: Sienkiewicz: Quo Vadis? (1896) and Ogniem i mieczem ("With Fire and Sword", 1884)) (1846–1916)	Russia (Poland)	novel	Harald Hjärne (1848–1922); Hans Hildebrand (1842–1913); Stanisław Tarnowski (1837–1917)
21	Giacomo Stampa (Note: Stampa: Arcanum anima [sic!]. Gedanken eines Menschenfreundes ("Mysterious Soul: Thoughts of a Philanthropist")) (?)	Italy	essays	Ármin Vámbéry (1832–1913)
22	René Vallery-Radot (Note: R. Valery-Radot: La Vie de Pasteur ("Life of Pasteur", 1900)) (1853–1933)	France	essays, biography	Eugène-Melchior de Vogüé (1848–1910); Sully Prudhomme (1839–1907); Henri Lavedan (1859–1940); Gabriel Hanotaux (1853–1944); Albert Sorel (1842–1906); Albert Vandal (1853–1910); Ernest Legouvé (1807–1903)
23	Malwida von Meysenbug (Note: Meysenbug: Memoiren einer Idealistin ("Memoirs of an Idealist", 1869–76), Stimmungsbilder ("Shades of Mood", 1879), and Der Lebensabend einer Idealistin: Nachtrag zu den "Memoiren einer Idealistin" ("The Retirement of an Idealist: Addendum to the 'Memoirs of an Idealist'", 1898)) (1816–1903)	Germany	memoirs	Gabriel Monod (1844–1912) (Note: The nomination by Gabriel Monod was made through Björnstjerne Björnson.)
24	Alexandru Dimitrie Xenopol (Note: Xenopol: Les principes fondamentaux de l'histoire ("The Fundamental Principles of History", 1899)) (1847–1920)	Romania	history, philosophy, essays	Ion Găvănescu (1859–1949)
25	Émile Zola (Note: Zola: "for his works in general.") (1840–1902)	France	novel, drama, short story	Marcellin Berthelot (1827–1907)

=== Prize decision ===
Of the 25 nominated candidates, the Nobel committee dismissed six inferior writers as out of the question for the award. These were Julius Gersdorff, Oscar le Pin, Franz Kemény, Giacomo Stampa, Ossip Lourié and Malwida von Meysenburg. The remaining candidates were acknowledged for having written some excellent works, but most of them were also ruled out for various reasons. These included Émile Zola who were dismissed on the ground that his works was not considered to be of the "ideal direction" outlined in Alfred Nobel's will.

The Nobel committee found the French poets Frédéric Mistral (subsequently awarded in 1904) and Sully Prudhomme, Polish novelist Henryk Sienkiewicz (awarded in 1905) and Italian writer Antonio Fogazzaro as worthy recipients of the award, with a special recommendation of Mistral and Prudhomme in their report to the Swedish Academy. The Nobel committee argued that the two poets were equally prominent, but that Prudhomme "more than most others" represented an "ideal direction" in literature, and that the French Academy's recommendation of Sully Prudhomme should be decisive in awarding him the prize.

On 14 November 1901 the Swedish Academy decided that that year's Nobel Prize in Literature should be awarded to Sully Prudhomme "in special recognition of his poetic composition, which gives evidence of lofty idealism, artistic perfection and a rare combination of the qualities of both heart and intellect.".

== Reactions ==
The Swedish Academy's decision to award Sully Prudhomme the first Nobel Prize in Literature was intensely covered by the French newspaper Le Figaro, who appeared to acknowledge the literature prize as the most interesting and important of the five Nobel prizes. On the day the prizes were awarded Le Figaro dedicated two front-page articles on Sully Prudhomme, one report on the prize itself and one interview with the poet, followed by another lengthy front-page article the next day presenting all the laureates, and a second article describing the idea of the Nobel prize.

Elsewhere, particularly Swedish reactions were heavily critical and caused a domestic scandal. The choice of Sully Prudhomme was interpreted as a politeness towards the Académie Française, model to the Swedish Academy. Many believed that Lev Tolstoy should have been awarded the first Nobel Prize in literature. The Swedish author August Strindberg angrily reacted saying that Prudhomme is "hardly a poet although he writes in verse", and that it was scandalous that he was awarded the prize just because he was a member of an academy that the Swedish Academy wanted to impress. The leading representatives of the contemporary Swedish cultural elite including August Strindberg, Selma Lagerlöf, Verner von Heidenstam, Oscar Levertin, Bruno Liljefors, Anders Zorn and Albert Engström protested against the Academy and sent a letter to Tolstoy saying he was the most worthy recipient of the prize and that the Swedish Academy did not represent the majority of Swedish cultural persons.

Critical reactions also came from the German newspaper Berliner Zeitung who described Prudhomme as a poet who was respected but not read. An English newspaper said that Sully Prudhomme was a second rate poet who had not achieved anything in many years. Many said Tolstoy was the superior candidate and should have been awarded the prize. The Swedish Academy defended themselves from the criticism by saying that Tolstoy had not been nominated for the prize, and could thus not be awarded.
