= Paul Sabatier =

Paul Sabatier may refer to:

- Paul Sabatier (chemist) (1854–1941), French chemist and Nobel Prize winner
- Paul Sabatier (theologian) (1858–1928), French clergyman and historian

== See also ==
- Paul Sabatier University, named after the chemist
