= Georges Paul François Laurent Laugée =

French painter (1853–1937)

Georges Paul François Laurent Laugée (19 December 1853 – 5 December 1937) was a Naturalist French Painter of the 19th and early 20th century.

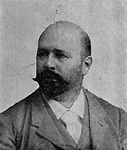
Undated photo of painter Georges P. F. Laugée

== Early life ==
Georges Paul François Laurent Laugée was born on 19 December 1853, the third of five children, in Montivilliers, a commune in the Seine-Maritime department in the Haute-Normandie region in northern France just to the northeast of Le Havre. He was the only son of a painter, Désiré-François Laugée (1823-1896) and his wife, Célestine Marie Malézieux Laugée (1825-1909). The elder Laugée was raised in Saint-Quentin, in the Picardy region of France, where he received his early training in visual arts with Louis Nicolas Lemasle (1788-1870), a pupil of Jacques-Louis David (1748-1825).

He moved to Paris at age seventeen in order to enroll in the École des Beaux-Arts, studying under François-Edouard Picot (1786-1868). He was a successful painter, exhibiting at the Paris Salon from 1845 to 1880, receiving medals in 1851, 1855 and 1861. He specialized in historical subjects; among his works is Death of William the Conqueror and Death of Zurbaran. In addition he painted more intimate scenes characterized by a diffuse light, as well as portraits.

By 1850 he had married Célestine Marie Malézieux, a woman from his hometown. They moved back to Picardy from Paris to raise their growing family, settling in the village of Nauroy not far from Saint-Quentin. However they kept a residence in Paris, which would have been almost a necessity for a Salon painter at the time. As a result, their son spent his childhood in both Paris and Picardy, where Célestine's family also maintained a country home. It is likely that all of Désiré's children would have received art lessons from their painter father. Three of them (two girls and the one boy, Georges) did pursue careers in art. As the only son of a painter, naturally the boy was encouraged by his father.

A promising young artist, he enrolled in the École des Beaux-Arts in 1870. However hostilities of the Franco-Prussian War commenced in July of that year, with the war continuing until early 1871, followed by two months of the Paris Commune, suppressed in May 1871. This undoubtedly interrupted Georges' studies, but he was able to resume when these conflicts were over. He began his Paris studies with Isidore Pils (1813-1875), who had also trained under Picot. After Pils' death, Georges studied with historical painter and portraitist Henri Lehmann (1814-1882).

== Education at the École des Beaux-Arts ==
The École was a critical period for Laugée in several respects. There he met Julien Dupré (1851-1910), another young art student who became his friend, colleague, and later brother-in-law. Dupré also hailed from an artistic family, and after the École, Dupré went to Picardy to study with the elder Laugée, whose daughter Marie Eléonore Françoise he married in 1876. For both Georges and Julien, realism was in their blood, with its long tradition in European and French painting. The near photo-realism of many painters, such as David, loomed large in the Salon and the various art schools. However new currents were in the air, and undoubtedly the two young artists were exposed to and influenced by two schools: the Impressionists and to some degree the Pre-Raphaelites.

The movement away from photo-realism had begun with Impressionist precursors such as Gustav Corbet (1819-1877), Édouard Manet (1832-1883), and Jean-Baptiste-Camille Corot (1796-1875). For these painters, realism meant finding reality in ordinary life, such as country scenes or peasants, and in particular, seeking its essence. This lesson was learned by the Impressionists, who took it a step further, and experimented with the play of light and color in outdoor settings, where they painted directly from life. Their paintings were quite outside the prevailing Realist tradition and were accordingly rejected by the Salon. The Impressionists organized their own exhibitions in the years 1874-1886.

The Pre-Raphaelite movement had begun earlier in England, in 1848. Although no French painters were involved, news of and works by these artists reached Paris long before the 1870s, with exhibits there as early as 1855. Rossetti's declaration of Pre-Raphaelite goals may have been known by Laugée and Dupré:

- To have genuine ideas to express
- To study Nature attentively, so as to know how to express them
- To sympathize with what is direct and serious and heartfelt in previous art, to the exclusion of what is conventional and self-parading and learned by rote
- To produce thoroughly good pictures and statues

These goals were not so different from those of the Impressionists, despite the large difference in the resulting paintings. While the Pre-Raphaelites sought photo-realism in one sense, in another their paintings went quite beyond it, to a search for authenticity. Digesting these currents, Laugée and Dupré were able to meld their formal academic training and its realist emphasis with Impressionist-inspired handling of light and brush, as well as something of the direct, serious, and heartfelt intensity of the Pre-Raphaelites. They became what may be described as "naturalist" painters, a designation that included painters from many European countries at the time. "Unlike either realism or impressionism, naturalism was not a formal movement, but an international sensibility that combined a concern for the depiction of ordinary working people with formal aesthetic elements that captured the subject in the context of the modern world.

Like many of his French naturalist colleagues, Laugée's focus was primarily on rural life−whether domestic scenes of beautiful young peasant mothers or grittier images of farm workers dragging themselves home at the end of a day of back-breaking labor." Some Naturalist painters, such as Jules-Alexis Muenier (1863-1942), leaned more in the direction of photo-realism, akin to the Pre-Raphaelites, even to the point of utilizing photography to help with composition. Laugée and Dupré however did not take this path, preferring a different, less literal style. Since Laugée shared similar artistic ideas and sensibilities with his now brother-in-law, the two remained close friends until Dupré's death in 1910. Later they would live near each other in Paris, in the 16th arrondissement, and in addition share a studio where they worked at 20 Boulevard Flandrin.

== Success at the Paris Salon ==
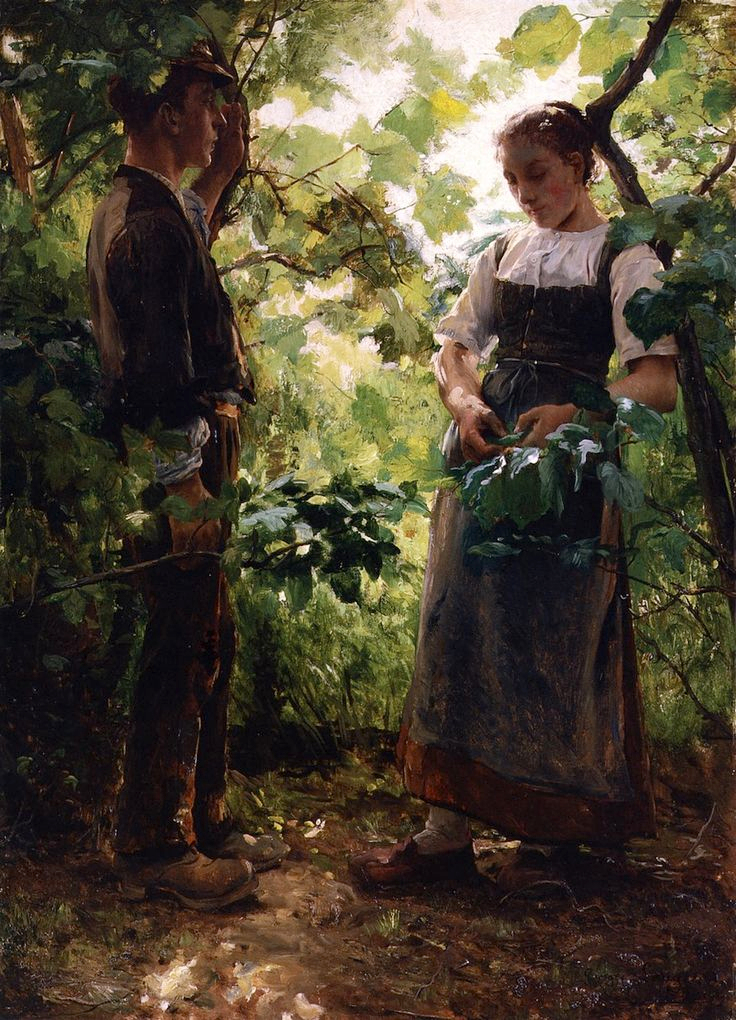
Au printemps de la vie (In the Springtime of Life): Paris Salon painting of 1891. (Private collection, France)

The Paris Salon was the place where every aspiring artist would seek to begin his career. During the 19th century it was probably the greatest art venue in the world. It was a juried show, so having one's paintings exhibited was a sort of guarantee of quality for prospective buyers. Medals were awarded for what the jury deemed outstanding work. Laugée made his debut at the Paris Salon of 1877 with painting 1226, Le repas de moissonneurs (The Meal of the Harvesters). He exhibited there on a regular basis, and in 1881 received bronze medals for his paintings En Octobre (In October) and Pauvre aveugle (Poor Beggar Woman). In 1878 Laugée's Salon painting En Octobre was exhibited in Vienna, which established his reputation in other European countries. He received another bronze medal in 1889.

In 1887 Laugée married Evangéline Jermina Fallet (1858-1958, known to the family as Eva) at Clermont sur Oise. Eva's father was professor of English in Saint-Quentin, at the Lycée Henri Martin. Laugée's family resided there, so it was convenient. The couple however moved to Paris, no doubt because of Laugée's expanding career. A year later, in 1888, their daughter, Denise Désirée Françoise (1888-1979) was born. Eva was a musician by training, though it is not known if she continued to pursue her career in Paris. She was among other things a composer, and it seems that for her wedding to Georges she wrote a trio for organ, violin and cello.

== International acclaim ==
During the 1890s Laugée's success continued. One of his 1891 Salon entries, Au printemps de la vie (In the Springtime of Life), which won a medal, was chosen for exhibition at the World's Columbian Exposition in Chicago in 1893, forming part of the French art shown there (see image right side). The painting clearly shows the melding of Impressionism with the intensity of the Pre-Raphaelites, not unlike what was done by other painters around the same time, such as John William Waterhouse (1849-1917) and Arthur Hughes (1832-1915, see his April Love). William Walton's guide to the art and architecture in the Exposition discusses Laugée's painting and observes its naturalist authenticity: "More of these humble folk, artfully arranged but with very little artificial glossing over of their awkward rusticity, may be seen in George (sic) Laugée's "In the Spring-time of Life", a very upright and much embarrassed pair facing each other in a pleasantly illuminated bit of greenery. Bastien-Lepage was one of the first to render this subtle charm of the tender passion burning sweetly through an uncouth exterior, like the flame of a horn lantern, as it were." In 1900, at the Éxposition Universelle in Paris, this painting received another medal, this time a silver medal.

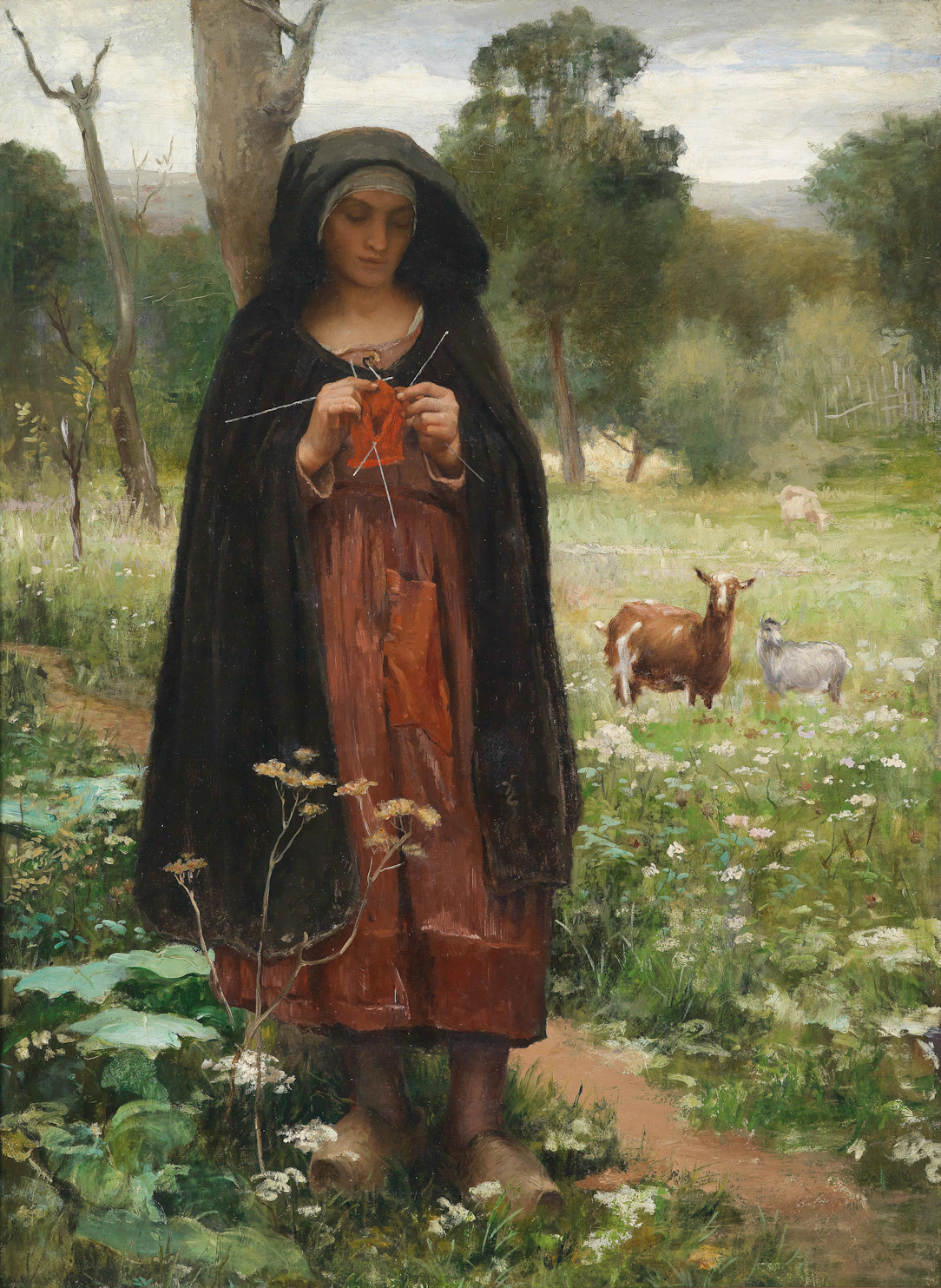
Bergère au tricot (Shepherdess Knitting), private collection

Images of Laugée's works began to appear in various publications, including Famous Paintings of the World (1894), which was an early type of introductory art history text. The authors selected Laugée's painting Bergere et Mouton (Shepherdess and Lamb, see illustration in gallery below), a "charming picture" of a shepherdess feeding her favorite lamb. "It is a simple story the artist has chosen to tell; but he has set it in a scene of tender and idyllic beauty, thoroughly appropriate to the gentle theme of affection he has selected for the central thought." The theme of the shepherdess is one to which Laugée returned many times. Typical is the Bergère au tricot (Shepherdess Knitting), shown to the right, which like Au printemps de la vie shows Pre-Raphaelite as well as Impressionist influences. Other paintings on the shepherdess theme can be seen in the Gallery below.

Laugée's exhibitions as well as his exposure in books caused him to achieve a following with art collectors, particularly in America. American fascination with French art was growing (as was American wealth), boosted by the 1893 World's Columbian Exposition in addition to the opening of galleries by European art dealers in major U.S. cities such as New York, Chicago, and San Francisco. A 1906 auction catalog published by the American Art Association features an illustration of Laugée's painting Coming Through the Rye (À travers le seigle).

In 1907 Laugée was elected to be a Member of the Committee of the Société des Artistes Français, established in 1881 with the primary task of organizing the Salon des artistes français, replacing the older Salon which the French government no longer handled it. In 1908 Laugée became a member of the Salon jury. It appears that at that point he no longer submitted paintings to it for exhibition; his last paintings to the Salon seem to have been in 1907: Aux approaches du crepuscule (The Coming of Twilight] and Le repas aux champs; soleil couchant (Meal in the Fields at Sunset]. There was no doubt much sorrow in his family with the passing of his mother in 1909, and that of his brother-in-law and close friend Julien Dupré in 1910. Likewise the years of World War I must have been difficult for the family in Saint Quentin, which was occupied by German forces in 1914, with the population forced to evacuate in 1916, followed by looting and damage or destruction to 80% of the buildings.

== Fame from children's books ==
Despite the difficulties in these years, there were bright spots in Laugée's life. His work reached new audiences on account of its use in American children's textbooks. In 1904 educator Ellen M. Cyr (d. 1920) wrote a series of textbooks, Cyr's Readers, that sought to introduce art history to elementary school students in the Boston area. Cyr used Laugée's painting Milking Time to illustrate a story in Cyr Graded Art Readers, Book II (see pages below). She explained her goals in selecting this type of illustration: "the artist, like the poet, perceives a delicate meaning in the humblest scenes which may surround him. The child with his vivid imagination is susceptible to these impressions, and can soon learn to recognize truth and beauty as presented to him in pictures." This sentiment, unfortunately, has been lost in later generations of elementary children's readers. Later another educator, Jennie Hall, used one of Laugée's paintings as part of a new curriculum that combined painting and poetry, in her case for older students. She matched The Preferred One with a poem by Christina Rossetti, "Snowdrop and Lamb". (see pages below).

== Last years ==
After World War I, with its large-scale mechanized destruction, all aspects of the environment in France changed quite drastically, especially with respect to culture. This change—not necessarily for the better—was already underway in the Pre-War years, but accelerated afterwards. Naturalism and even Impressionism no longer had much interest for newer generations of painters, who it seems felt that Surrealism and Dadaism were better suited to the times. By 1930 Laugée had been painting and exhibiting for over 50 years, and so with his eyesight failing, he and his wife chose to retire and left Paris to settle in the village of Boullarre in Picardy, about 50 miles northeast of Paris. Despite his vision problems, Laugée continued to work, though only painting small sketches. He died in Boullarre on December 5, 1937. His wife Eva lived on until 1958, dying just shy of her 100th birthday in Liverpool.

== Works ==
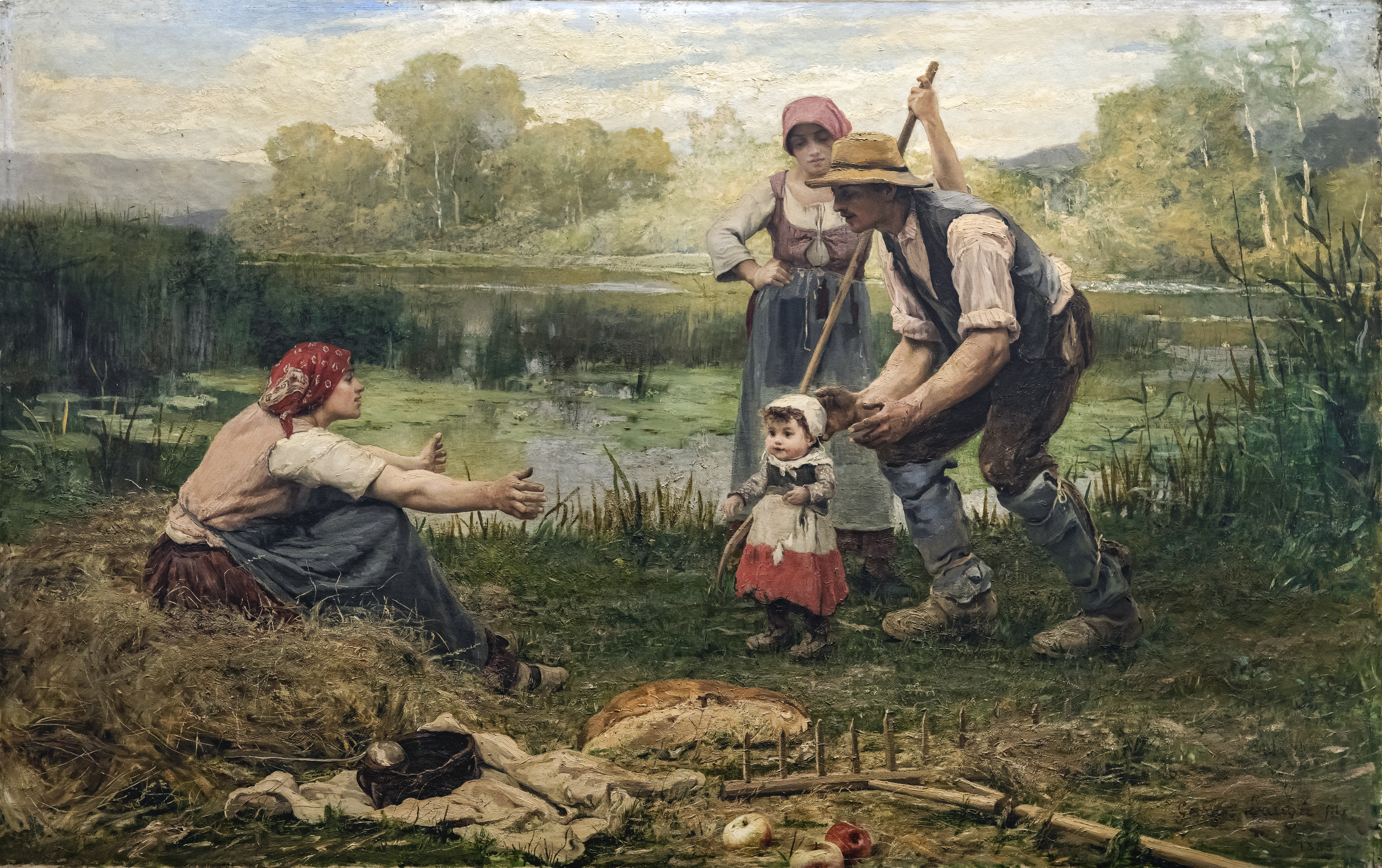
Les premiers pas (First steps), Musée des Beaux-Arts de Carcassonne, Paris Salon, 1883

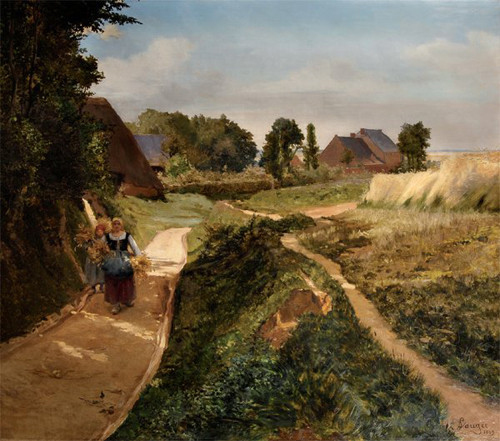
Le retour des champs (Return from the Fields)

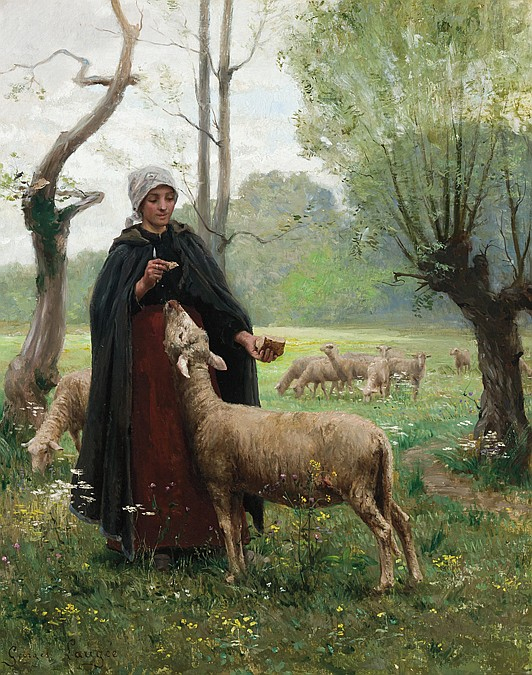
Shepherdess Feeding Her Sheep

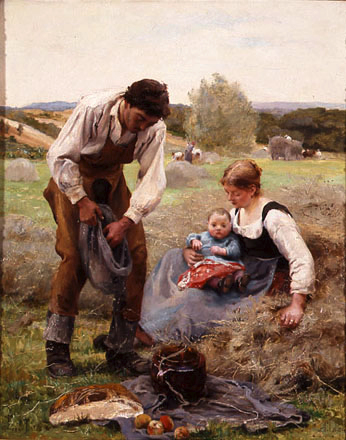
Le repas des moissonneurs (Meal of the Harvester's Family), Paris Salon, 1877

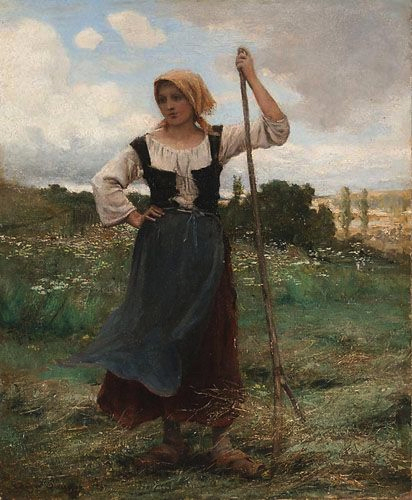
Une juene moisenneuse (Young Girl Harvester in the Field)

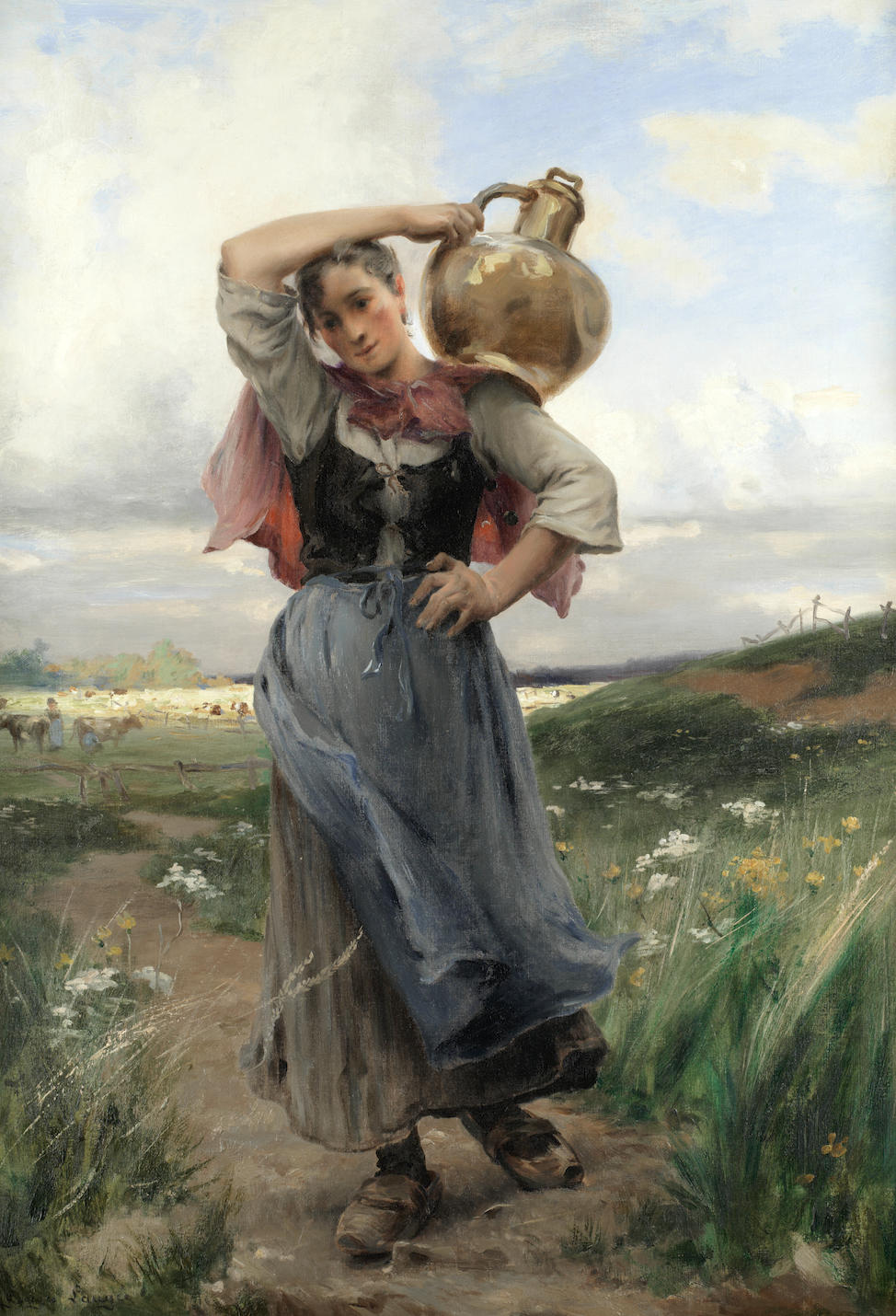
A l'heure de traire (Milking Time), Paris Salon, 1892

Page from children's art reader by Ellen Cyr

Page from children's art reader by Ellen Cyr

Page from book by Jennie Hall using painting by Laugée to illustrate a poem by Christina Rossetti

For additional paintings, and works in other media, visit the web page Peintres-et-sculpteurs.

== Paintings in museums ==
In the United States

- Brauer Museum of Art, Valparaiso (Indiana),;

In France

- Département de l'Aisne, Portrait du sénateur François-Ferdinand Malézieux, 1906, oil on canvas;
- Paris :
  - Musée du Louvre : Soir d'orages, 1937;
  - Musée national des arts et traditions populaires;
- Saintes, Musée de l'Échevinage: Enterrement d'une jeune fille à Étricourt, oil on canvas;
- Boulogne-sur-Mer, Château Museum : En octobre, oil on canvas;
- Nantes, Musée des beaux-arts : Le Préféré, oil on canvas;
- Berck, Musée de France d'Opale Sud: Retour de pêche, oil on canvas;
- Crest, Mairie : Les Glaneuses, oil on canvas;

In the UK

- Museum of Ipswich : Paysans dans un champ de chaume, 1882.

== Medals ==
- Bronze, Salon de Paris, 1881 for Portrait du sénateur Henri Martin;
- Bronze, Exposition universelle de 1889;
- Silver, Exposition universelle de 1900.
