= Louis Auguste Sabatier =

French Protestant theologian

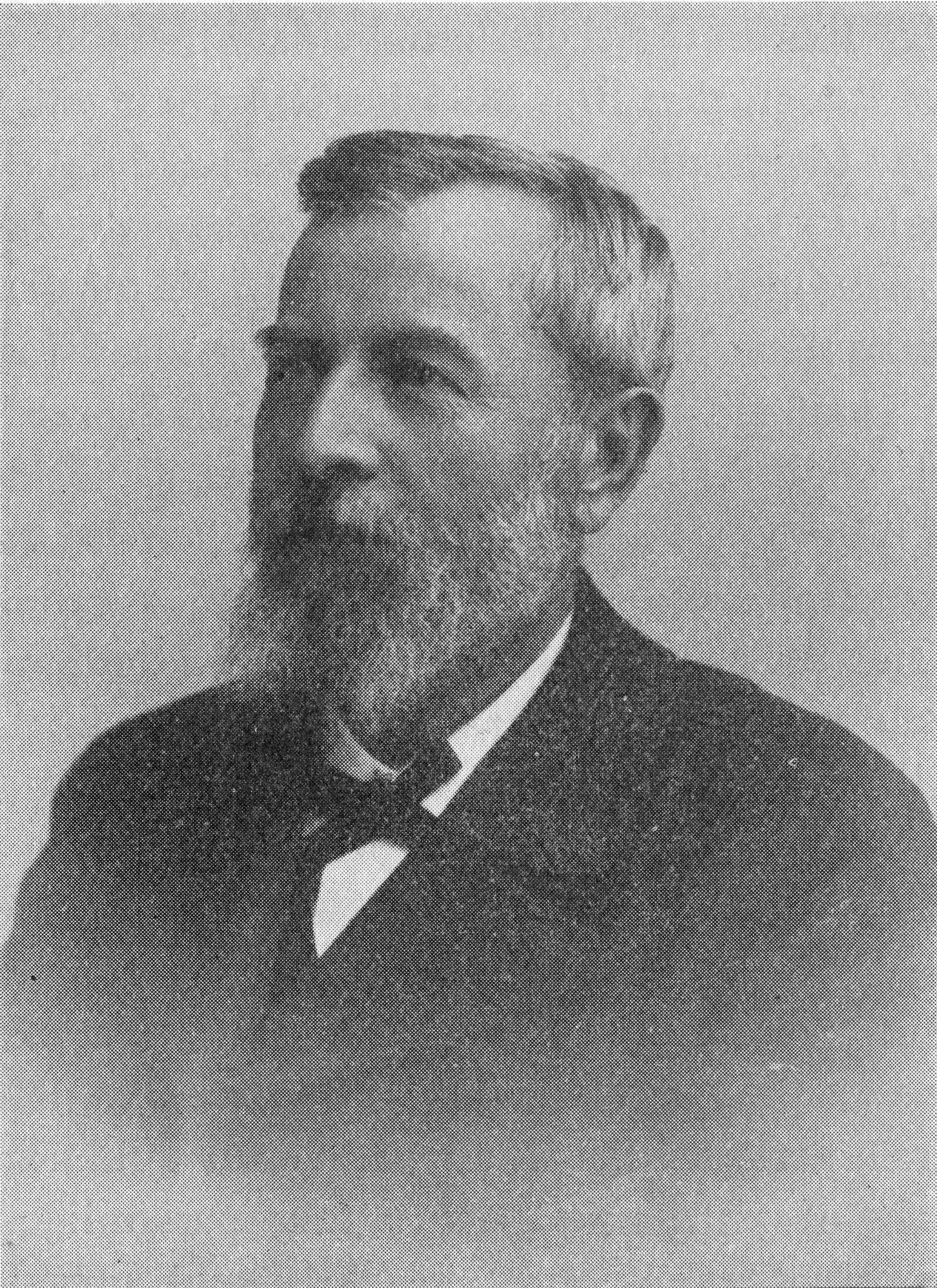
- Born: 22 October 1839; Vallon-Pont-d'Arc, Ardèche, France
- Died: 12 April 1901 (aged 61); Strasbourg, France
- Occupation: Theologian
- Writing career
- Language: French

Louis Auguste Sabatier (French: [sabatje]; 22 October 1839 – 12 April 1901) was a French Protestant theologian.

== Biography ==
He was born at Vallon-Pont-d'Arc, Ardèche and died in Strasbourg.

He was educated at the Protestant theological faculty of Montauban as well as at the universities of Tübingen and Heidelberg.

After holding the pastorate at Aubenas in Ardèche from 1864 to 1868, he was appointed professor of reformed dogmatics at the Protestant theological faculty of Strasbourg. His markedly French sympathies during the War of 1870 led to his expulsion from Strassburg in 1872. After five years' effort he succeeded in establishing a Protestant Faculty of Theology in Paris (today: Faculté de théologie protestante de Paris) along with Eugène Ménégoz, and became professor and then dean. In 1886, he became a teacher in the newly founded religious science department of the École des Hautes Etudes at the Sorbonne.

His brother, Paul, was a noted theological historian. He is the father of two daughters, Marguerite Chevalley, translator, and Lucie Chevalley. Claude Chevalley, mathematician, is his grandson.

== Recognition ==
In 1901, Sabatier was nominated for the Nobel Prize in Literature by French historian Gabriel Monod for his Esquisse d'une philosophie de la religion d'après la psychologie et l'histoire ("Outlines of a Philosophy of Religion based on Psychology and History", 1897). He died before his only chance to be awarded.

== Published works ==
Among Louis Auguste Sabatier's chief works were:

- Essai sur les sources de la vie de Jésus, Les Trois premiers Évangiles et le quatrième ("Essay on the Sources of the Life of Jesus, The First Three Gospels and the Fourth", 1866)
- L'Apôtre Paul ("The Apostle Paul", 1870)
- Mémoire sur la notion hébraïque de l'Esprit ("Memory on the Hebrew Notion of the Spirit", 1879)
- Études sur la révocation de l'édit de Nantes: with Frank Puaux ("Studies on the Revocation of the Edict of Nantes", 1886)
- Les origines littéraires et la composition de l'apocalypse de Saint Jean ("The Literary Origins and Composition of the Apocalypse of Saint John", 1888)
- De la vie intime des dogmes et de leur puissance d'évolution ("The Vitality of Christian Dogmas and their Power of Evolution", 1890)
- L'Évangile de Pierre et les évangile canoniques ("The Gospel of Peter and the Canonical Gospels", 1893)
- Religion et culture moderne ("Religion and Modern Culture", 1897)
- Évolution historique de la doctrine du salut ("The Doctrine of the Atonement and its Historical Evolution", 1903)
- Esquisse d'une philosophie de la religion d'après la psychologie et l'histoire ("Outlines of a Philosophy of Religion based on Psychology and History", 1897)
- Les Religions d'autorité et religion de l'esprit ("Religions of Authority and the Religion of the Spirit", 1904; posthumous), to which his colleague Jean Réville prefixed a short memoir.

These works show Sabatier as "at once an accomplished dialectician and a mystic in the best sense of the word".
