= Lucie Chevalley =

Lucie Chevalley (née Sabatier; 27 July 1882, Le Petit-Quevilly – 1 October 1979 dead at the age of ninety-seven) was the founder of social d'Aide aux Emigrants known as one of the international aids which provides services for refugees in France.

She devoted and dedicated her life to serve for humanitarian organizations she also has a patient of helping refugees. She spent decades helping refugees in her country France and across Europe as well. She also worked as a member of the Council of State in France for refugees and stateless people. In summer 1942 she worked for saving the lives of others and also established the underground organization Entraide Temporaire (Temporary Mutual Assistance) toiled day and night to rescue life of 500 Jewish children.

Her father, Auguste Sabatier, is a French reformed theologian and academic.

== Awards ==
- 1965: Nansen Refugee Award
- 1993 : Righteous Among the Nations
