= Eugène Ménégoz =

French Lutheran theologian (1838–1921)

Eugène Ménégoz (25 September 1838 – 29 October 1921) was a French Lutheran theologian who was a native of Algolsheim, Haut-Rhin.

He studied theology in Strasbourg, and in 1866 became pastor at the parish of Billettes in Paris. In 1877 he was appointed full professor to the Protestant Faculty of Theology in Paris.

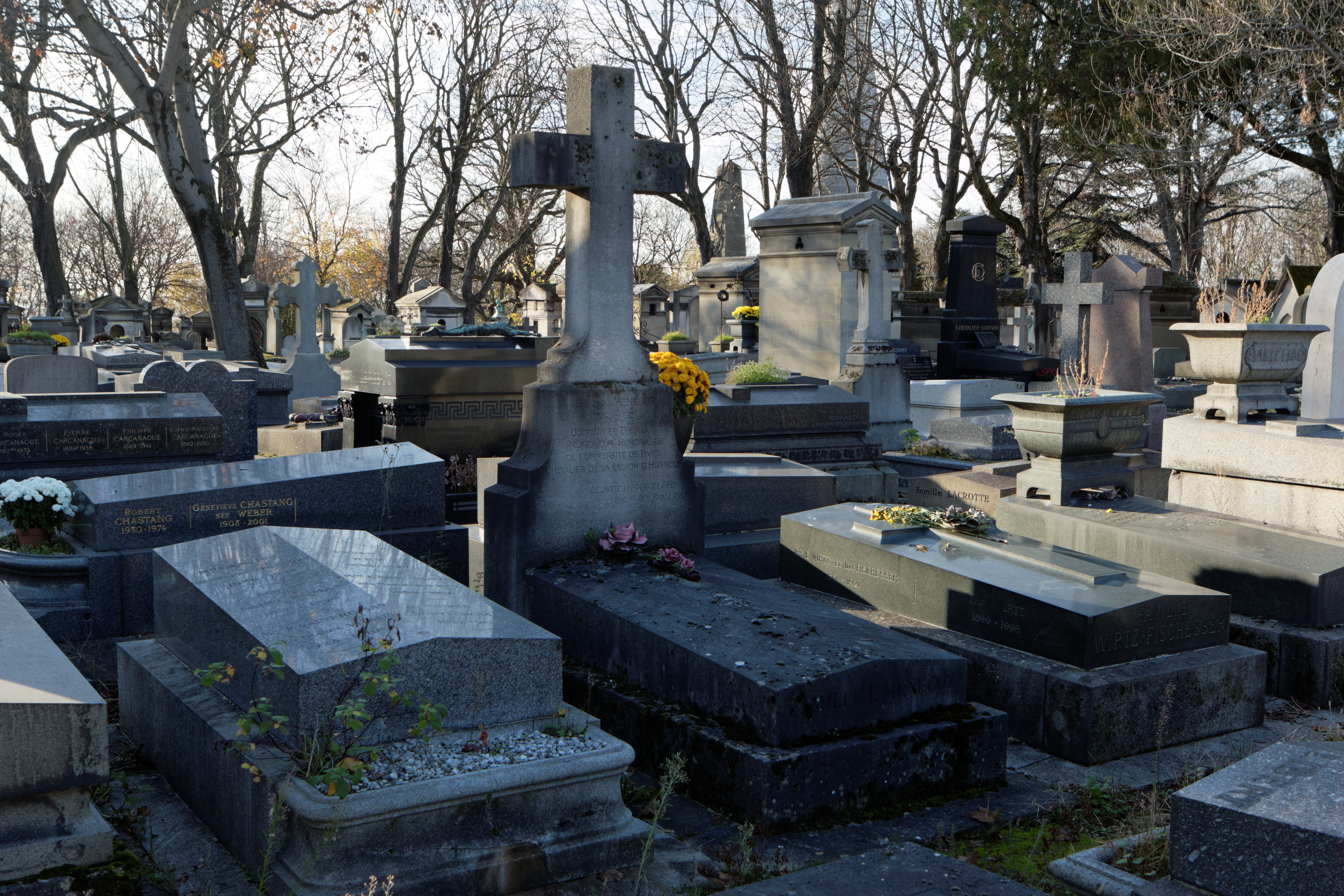
Gravesite of Eugène Ménégoz, Père Lachaise Cemetery (division 86).

With Louis Auguste Sabatier (1839–1921), he was originator of the French "Symbolo-Fideism" movement, a theological concept that was a union of symbolism and fideism. In his lectures and writings Ménégoz stressed that salvation was achieved through the act of faith independent of creed. A few of his more important publications were:

- L'autorité de Dieu, réflexions sur l'autorité en matière de foi (1892).
- La notion biblique du miracle (1894).
- Étude sur le dogmas de la Trinité (1898).
- Publications diverses sur le fidéisme et son application à l'enseignement chrétien traditionnel, 5 volumes (1900–21).

== Bibliography ==
- Musee Protestant Essay on Fideo-symbolism
- Klaus-Gunther Wesseling (1993). "Ménégoz, Louis Eugène". In Bautz, Traugott (ed.). Biographisch-Bibliographisches Kirchenlexikon (BBKL) (in German). Vol. 5. Herzberg: Bautz. cols. 1255–1256. ISBN 3-88309-043-3. English translation
