= Charles Borgeaud =

Swiss historian, and jurist (1861–1940)

Charles Borgeaud (Le Sentier, 15 agosto 1861 – Onex, 6 ottobre 1940) was a Swiss historian and Jurist.

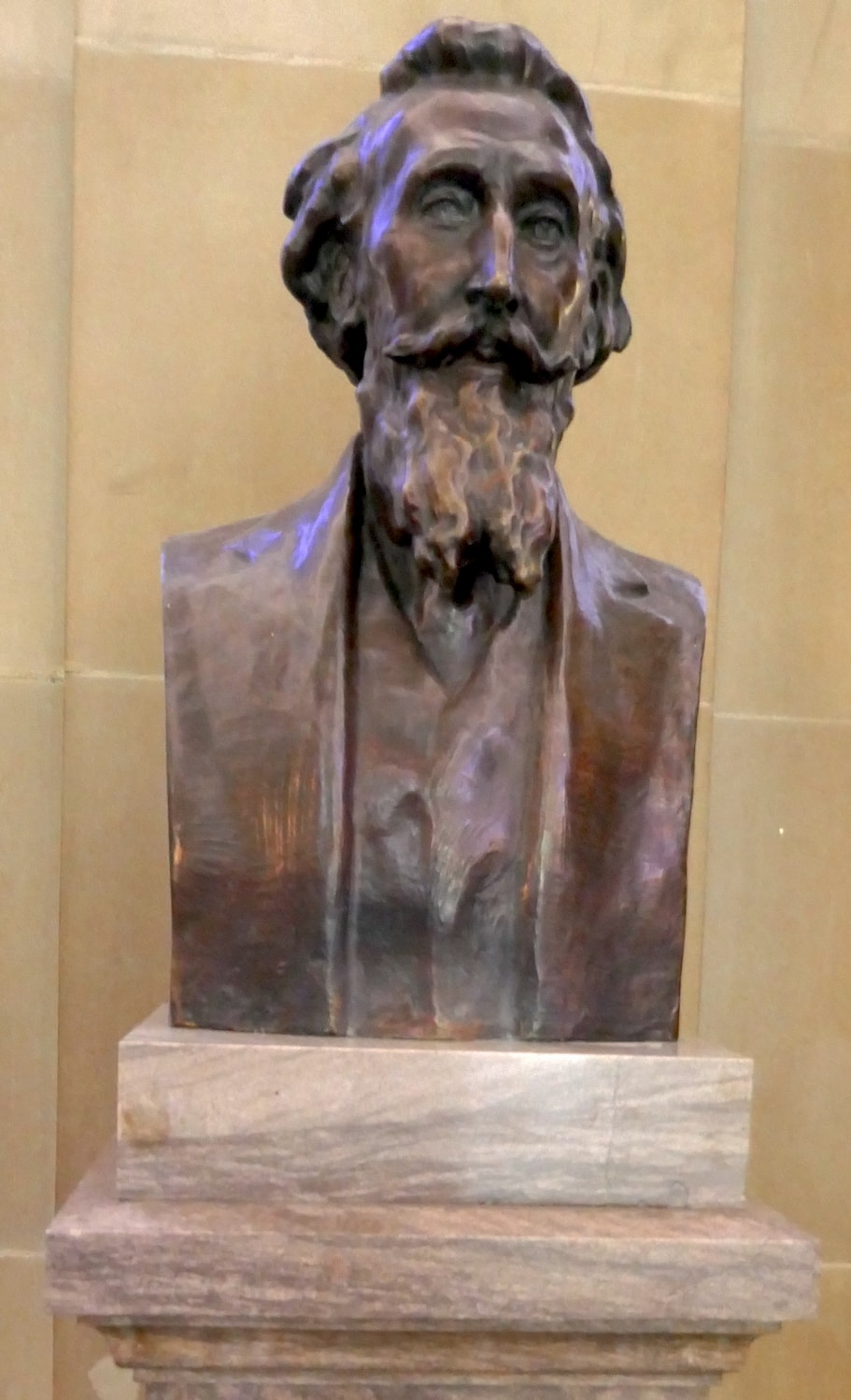
Sculpture of Charles Borgeaud in the University Of Geneva

== Early life ==
He was born in 1861 in Le Sentier, in the Vallée de Joux, into a family of notables from Pully. In 1878 he became a student at the University of Geneva. He continued his studies in Germany, at the University of Jena where he earned a degree in Philosophy. He returned to Geneva where he wrote his thesis on Law.

In the following 10 years he traveled to Paris and London. In London he found important documents that would form his doctrine and guide him in his next work. Modern democracies emerged thanks to the religious reforms and policies of the sixteenth century.

== Academic career ==
In 1896 the University of Geneva offered him the chair in History of Swiss Institutional Politics. During this period he began to write the history of the University of Geneva. It was finished in 1934 in four volumes. The first volume led him to be nominated for the Nobel Prize in Literature in 1901.

On October 24, 1924, he received the honorary degree of the Geneva bourgeoisie.

== Recognition ==
In 1901, Borgeaud was nominated for the Nobel Prize in Literature for one of his monumental works, the Histoire de l'Université de Genève. L'académie de Calvin. 1559-1798 ("The History of the Geneva University: Calvin's Academy", 1900) by the scholar Paul Seippel and historians Antoine Guilland and Wilhelm Oechsli.

== Publications ==
- J.-J. Rousseau's Religionsphilosophie (1883)
- Établissement et revision des constitutions en Amérique et en Europe. Paris: Thorin e fils, editeurs. 1893.
- Adoption and Amendment of Constitutions in Europe and America. Translated by Hazen, Charles Downer. New York and London: Macmillan and Co. 1895.
- Histoire du plébiscite: t. 1. le plébiscite dans l'antiquité, Grèce et Rome (1887)
- Calvin, fondateur de l'Académie de Genève (1897)
- Histoire de l´université de Genève: L'Académie de Calvin (1900)
- Le Jean-Jacques Rousseau genevois de Gaspard Vallette... (1912)
- La chute, la restauration de la République de Genève et son entrée dans la Confédération suisse, 1798-1815 (1915)
- La neutralité suisse au centre de la Société des nations (1921)
