= Paul Sabatier (theologian) =

French historian & academic (1858–1928)

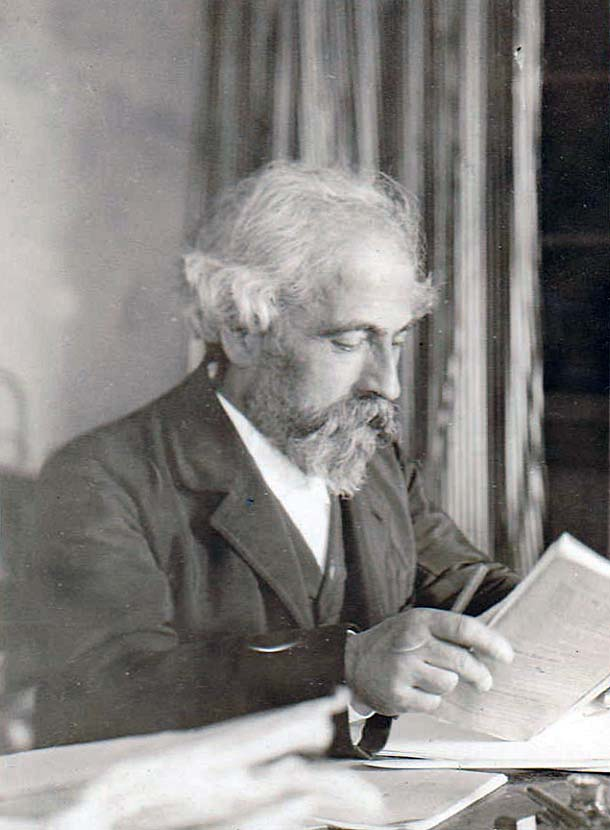
- Paul Sabatier in 1905
- Born: 3 or 9 August 1858; Saint-Michel-de-Chabrillanoux, France
- Died: 5 March 1928 (aged 69); Strasbourg, France
- Education: Protestant Faculty of Theology in Paris
- Occupations: theologian, professor, historian
- Employer(s): Protestant Faculty of Theology, University of Strasbourg
- Relatives: Louis Auguste Sabatier

Charles Paul Marie Sabatier (3 or 9 August 1858 – 5 March 1928) (Note: Sources differ on Sabatier's date of birth: some give 3 August 1858, others 9 August.) was a French clergyman and historian who produced the first modern biography of St. Francis of Assisi. He was nominated for the Nobel Prize in Literature five times.

== Life ==
Sabatier was born at Saint-Michel-de-Chabrillanoux in Ardèche, and was educated at the Protestant Faculty of Theology in Paris. In 1885 he became vicar of St Nicolas, Strasbourg, but in 1889, declining an offer of preferment which was conditional on his becoming a German subject, he was expelled.

For four years he was pastor of Saint-Cierge in Ardèche, but had to retire in 1893 due to health concerns. He then devoted himself entirely to historical research, spending much of his time in Italy. He had already produced an edition of the Didache, and in November 1893 published his important Life of Francis of Assisi. This book gave a great stimulus to the study of medieval literary and religious documents, especially of such as are connected with the history of the Franciscan Order. In 1908 he delivered the Jowett Lectures on Modernism at the Passmore Edwards Settlement, London.

Sabatier's 1893 book La vie de St. François d'Assise (translated as Life of St. Francis of Assisi in 1894) was placed upon the Index of Forbidden Books by the Catholic Church in 1894. Emily Marshall obtained a copy of his book and she came to meet him in the 1890s. He agreed that her ideas for reviving the Third Order were in line with the ideas of St Francis. As a result she wrote "The dawn breaking, and some thoughts on the third order of St. Francis, with translation from the French" in 1896. Her ideas took root in the Anglican church in Guyana. He also published in 1905 A propos de la séparation des églises et de l'État, in 1909 Les modernistes, notes d'histoire religieuse contemporaine, and in 1911 L'orientation religieuse de la France actuelle.

In 1919, Sabatier became professor of Church history at the Protestant Faculty of Theology of the University of Strasbourg. He died in Strasbourg in 1928.

== Collections ==
In 1938 University College London (UCL) received approximately 200 books from The International Society for Franciscan Studies, which Sabatier founded. The books were donated to UCL after the society disbanded, and include publications by the society in addition to works on St Francis of Assisi and the Franciscan Order.

== Works ==
- La Didachè, texte grec, avec un comm. Paris (1885)
- Codex colbertinus parisiensis. Qvatuor Evangelia ante Hieronymum latine translata post editionem Petri Sabatier cum ipso codice collatam (1888)
- Life of St. Francis of Assisi
- Modernism The Jowett Lectures (1908)
