= Nauroy =

- Commune
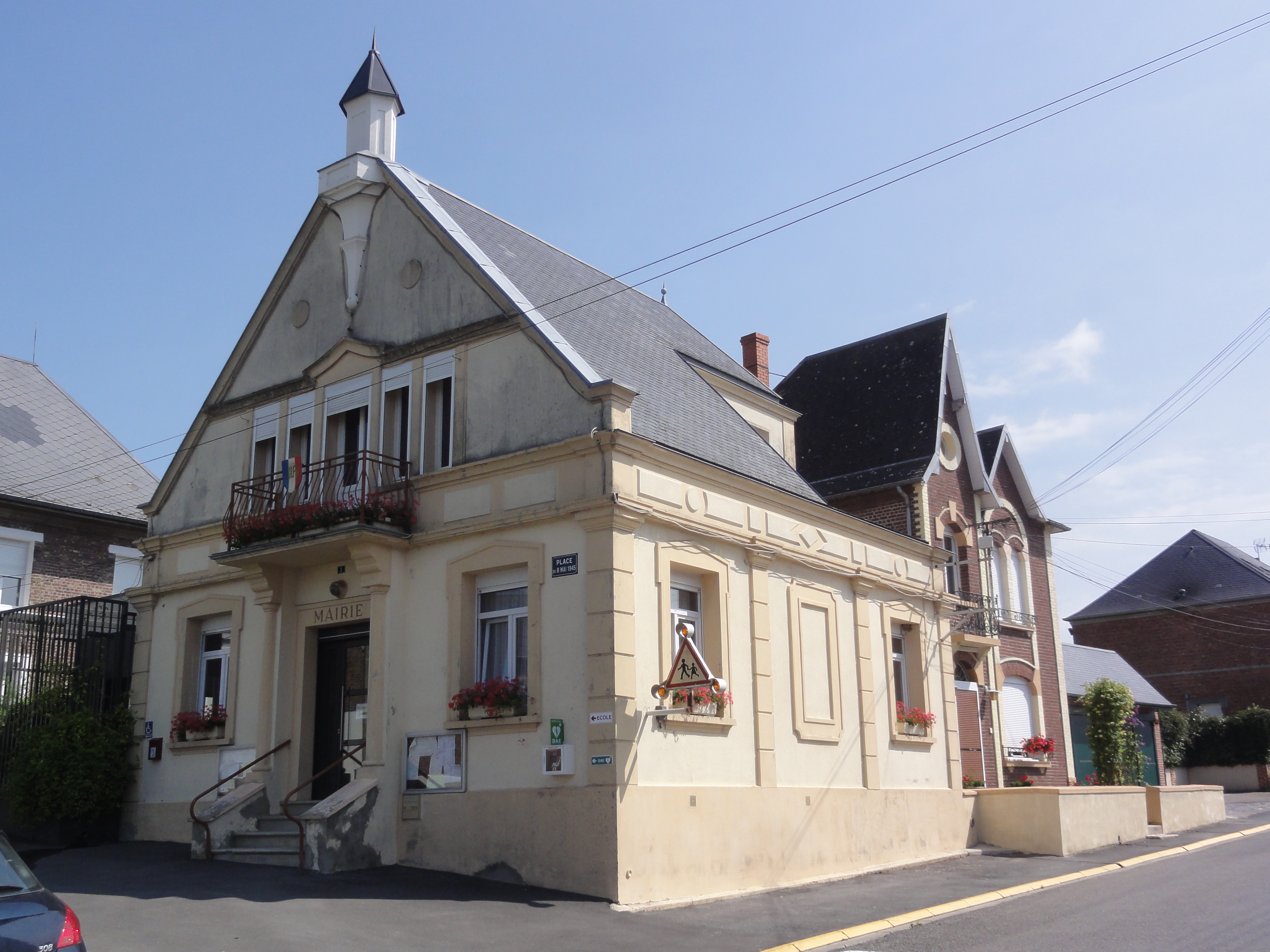
- The town hall of Nauroy
- Location of Nauroy
- Location within France Location within Hauts-de-France
- Coordinates: 49°57′15″N 3°15′21″E
- Country: France
- Region: Hauts-de-France
- Department: Aisne
- Arrondissement: Saint-Quentin
- Canton: Bohain-en-Vermandois
- Intercommunality: Pays du Vermandois

Government
  - Mayor (2026–32): Jean-Louis Caire
- Area^{1}: 6.27 km^{2} (2.42 sq mi)
- Elevation: 144 m (472 ft)
- Highest elevation: 152 m (499 ft)
- Lowest elevation: 93 m (305 ft)
- Population (2023): 659
  - Density: 105/km^{2} (272/sq mi)
- Time zone: UTC+01:00 (CET)
  - Summer (DST): UTC+02:00 (CEST)
- INSEE/Postal code: 02539 /02420
- ^{1} French Land Register data, which excludes lakes, ponds, glaciers > 1 km^{2} (0.386 sq mi or 247 acres) and river estuaries.

Nauroy (French pronunciation: [noʁwa]) is a commune in the Aisne department in Hauts-de-France in northern France.

== Population ==
Historical population
Year	Pop.	±% p.a.
1968	666	—
1975	683	+0.36%
1982	685	+0.04%
1990	728	+0.76%
1999	681	−0.74%
2007	683	+0.04%
2012	714	+0.89%
2017	703	−0.31%
2023	659	−1.07%
Source: INSEE

== Notable people ==
- Désiré François Laugée (1823-1896), painter and poet, mayor of Nauroy in the 1880s.
- Georges Laugée (1853-1937), Naturalist French painter of the 19th and early 20th century, son of the preceding. Part of his work dedicated to the life of peasants in the fields was set in Nauroy. His daughter, Désirée Françoise, married Edmond Eggli (1881-1956) in Nauroy on 18 July 1914.
- Joachim Pierre Joseph Malézieux (1851-1906), né à Nauroy, dessinateur et poète, auteur de nombreux dessins des églises de la région.
- Maurice Vernes (1845-1923), French theologian, born in Nauroy

== See also ==
- Communes of the Aisne department
