= Reveille (disambiguation) =

Reveille can refer to:

- Reveille, the bugle call
- Reveille (dog), the Texas A&M mascot

== Geography ==
- Reveille (Pulaski, Tennessee), listed on the National Register of Historic Places in Giles County, Tennessee
- Reveille (Richmond, Virginia), listed on the National Register of Historic Places in Richmond, Virginia

== Film and TV ==
- Reveille Productions, one of three television production companies which were subsumed into Endemol Shine North America
- "Reveille" (NCIS), an episode of the CBS show NCIS
- Reveille (film), by George Pearson
- Reveille with Beverly, a 1943 musical film

== Publications ==
- The Daily Reveille, the Louisiana State University student newspaper
- Reveille (newspaper), a defunct British tabloid
- "Reveille", the title of a poem by A. E. Housman

== Music ==
- "Reveille", for violin and piano by Benjamin Britten
- Reveille (band), an American nu metal band
- Reveille (album), by the band Deerhoof
- "Reveille", art song on the Housman poem by Graham Peel (1877-1937)
- "Réveille", a French song by Zachary Richard about the Acadian Deportation
- "The Reveille", a song for male voice chorus composed in 1907 by Edward Elgar to words by Bret Harte
