= Albert Réville =

French Protestant theologian (1826–1906)

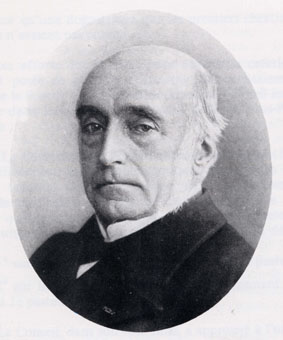
Albert Réville

Albert Réville (4 November 1826, Dieppe, Seine-Maritime – 25 October 1906) was a distinguished French Protestant theologian, known for his 'extremist' liberal views. He is also known for being one of the first intellectuals to join the Dreyfusard cause when the Dreyfus Affair erupted in the 1890s.

Réville was born in Dieppe, Seine-Maritime. After studying at the universities of Geneva and Strassburg, he became pastor at Luneray (near Dieppe), and from 1851 to 1872 he was pastor of the Walloon church in Rotterdam. In 1880 he became professor of the History of Religions in the Collège de France, during the course of which he helped found the Revue de l'histoire des religions with Maurice Vernes. In 1886, he was appointed as the inaugural President of the new "Fifth Section" for Religious Sciences at the École Pratique des Hautes Études in Paris. He was elected as a member to the American Philosophical Society in 1886.

He was a prolific writer on the comparative history of world religions. In addition to the history of Christianity, he published on the native religions of Central America (about which he gave the 1884 Hibbert Lectures), Chinese religion and the history of the idea of the Devil.

He was a notable advocate of David Strauss' vision hypothesis, that the accounts of the resurrection of Jesus were historically due to a vision caused by nervous tension by Mary Magdalene and subsequent mass hysteria among the disciples.

His son, Jean Réville, was also a theologian.

== Translated works ==
- Storia del Diavolo, Lulu Press, Raleigh (NC), 2018, Italian version of Histoire du Diable (1870), translated by Rev. Marco Lupi Speranza, ISBN 978-0-24-409658-8.
