= Maurice Vernes =

Maurice Vernes (25 September 1845, in Nauroy – 29 July 1923, in Paris) was a French Protestant theologian and historian of religion.

He studied theology at the Protestant seminary in Montauban and the University of Strasbourg, receiving his doctorate in 1874. From 1877 he taught as a lecturer at the Sorbonne, and two years later, became a professor at the Faculté de théologie protestante de Paris (Protestant Faculty of Theology in Paris). In 1886, he was named director-adjoint at the École pratique des hautes études (section on religious sciences). From 1901 he taught classes as a professor at the Collège libre des sciences sociales (CLSS) in Paris.

In 1880 he founded the journal, Revue de l'Histoire des religions.

== Selected works ==
- Histoire des idées messianiques depuis Alexandre jusqu'a l'empereur Hadrien, (graduate thesis, 1874) – History of messianic ideas from Alexander the Great up until Hadrian.
- Mélanges de critique religieuse, 1880 – Collection of religious critiques.
- L'histoire des religions; son esprit, sa méthode, et ses divisions, son enseignement en France et à l'etranger, 1887 – The history of religions; its spirit, methods and divisions, its teaching in France and abroad.
- Une nouvelle hypothèse sur la composition et l'origine du Deutéronome, 1887 – A new hypothesis about the composition and origin of Deuteronomy.
- Du prétendu polythéisme des Hébreux; essai critique sur la religion du peuple d'Israël, suivi d'un examen de l'authenticité des écrits prophétiques, 1891 – On alleged polytheism of the Hebrews; critical essay on the religion of the people of Israel.
- Les croyances populaires : leçons sur l'histoire des religions professées à l'Université nouvelle de Bruxelles (by Élie Reclus, foreword by Vernes; 1908) – Popular beliefs: Lessons on the history of religion taught at the new University of Brussels.
- Histoire sociale des religions, 1911 – Social history of religions.
- La crise de la religion en France, 1911 – The crisis of religion in France.
- Les emprunts de la Bible hébraïque au grec et au latin, 1914.
