= Saint-Michel-de-Chabrillanoux =

- Commune
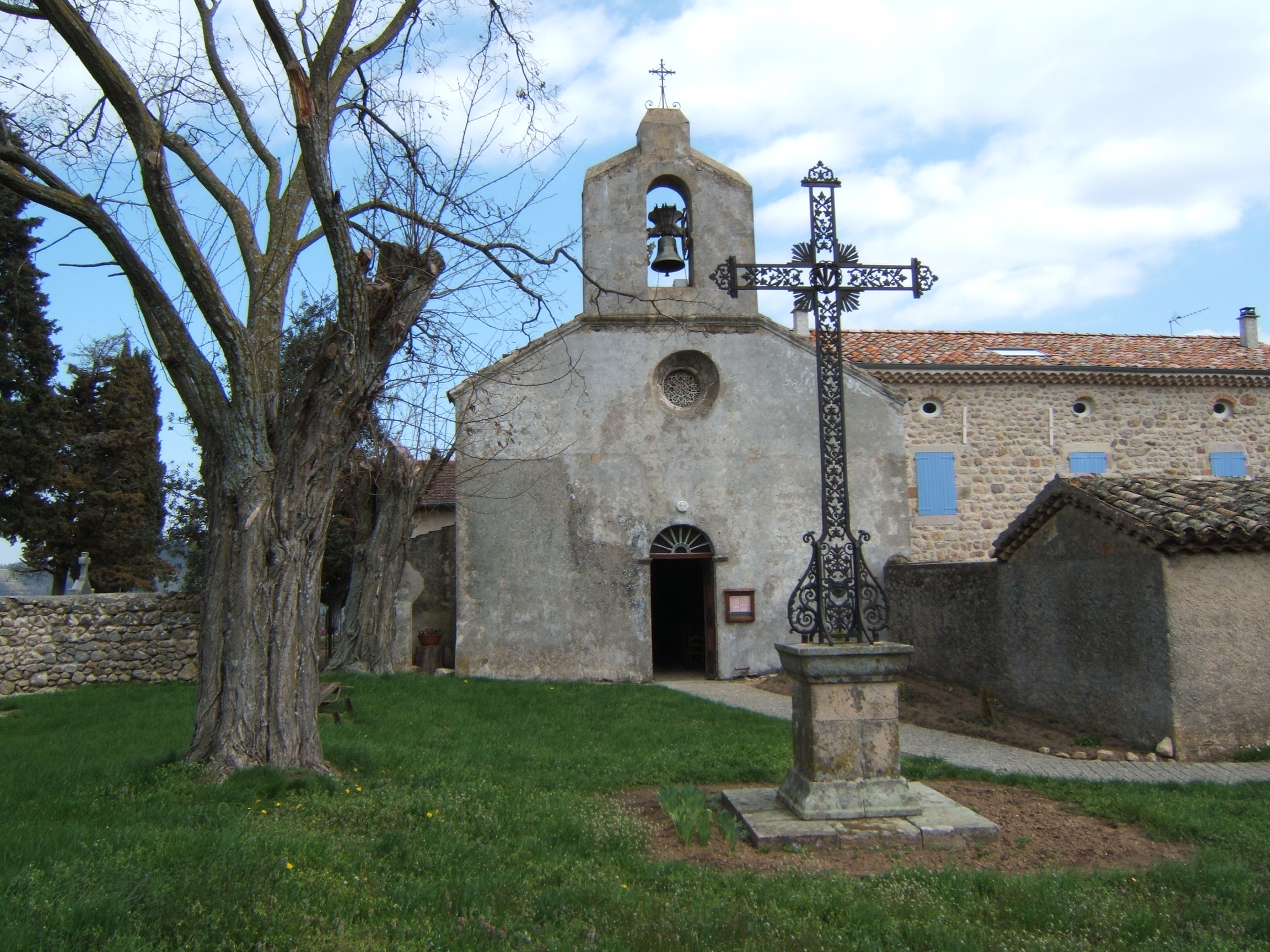
- The church in Saint-Michel-de-Chabrillanoux
- Location of Saint-Michel-de-Chabrillanoux
- Location within France Location within Auvergne-Rhône-Alpes
- Coordinates: 44°50′25″N 4°36′11″E
- Country: France
- Region: Auvergne-Rhône-Alpes
- Department: Ardèche
- Arrondissement: Privas
- Canton: Haut-Eyrieux
- Intercommunality: CA Privas Centre Ardèche

Government
  - Mayor (2020–2026): Gilles Lebre
- Area^{1}: 12.14 km^{2} (4.69 sq mi)
- Elevation: 540 m (1,770 ft)
- Highest elevation: 674 m (2,211 ft)
- Lowest elevation: 183 m (600 ft)
- Population (2023): 406
  - Density: 33.4/km^{2} (86.6/sq mi)
- Time zone: UTC+01:00 (CET)
  - Summer (DST): UTC+02:00 (CEST)
- INSEE/Postal code: 07278 /07360
- ^{1} French Land Register data, which excludes lakes, ponds, glaciers > 1 km^{2} (0.386 sq mi or 247 acres) and river estuaries.

Saint-Michel-de-Chabrillanoux (French pronunciation: [sɛ̃ miʃɛl də ʃabʁijanu]; Occitan: Sant Michèu de Chabrilhanós) is a commune in the Ardèche department of the Auvergne-Rhône-Alpes region in southern France.

== Population ==
Historical population
Year	Pop.	±% p.a.
1968	379	—
1975	274	−4.53%
1982	250	−1.30%
1990	238	−0.61%
1999	270	+1.41%
2007	349	+3.26%
2012	381	+1.77%
2017	354	−1.46%
2023	406	+2.31%
Source: INSEE

== See also ==
- Communes of the Ardèche department
