= Gottfried Baist =

Gottfried Baist (Ulfa (today part of Nidda), 28 February 1853 - Freiburg im Breisgau, 22 October 1920) was a German Hispanist and Romance studies scholar.

== Selected works ==
- Die spanische Sprache, in: Grundriss der romanischen Philologie, ed. by Gustav Gröber vol. 1, Strassburg 1888, S. 689–714, 2. Aufl. 1904, S. 878 - 915
- Die spanische Literatur, in: Grundriss der romanischen Philologie, ed. by Gustav Gröber, 1. volume, 2. Abt., Strassburg 1897, S. 383–466, 2nd edition, Strassburg 1904-06
- Grammatik der Spanischen Sprache, 2nd edition, Strassburg 1906
- (Hrsg.) Juan Manuel, El libro de la caza, Halle a.S. 1880, Hildesheim 1984
- (Hrsg.) Antonio Muñoz, Aventuras en verso y prossa, Halle a.S. 1907

== Bibliography ==
- David Pharies, Gottfried Baist as Etymologist, in: Zeitschrift für romanische Philologie 96, 1980, p. 92-107
- Friedrich Schürr, in: Zeitschrift für romanische Philologie 46, 1926, p. 129-134
- Adolf Zauner: Gottfried Baist als Hispanist, in: Archiv für das Studium der neueren Sprachen und Literaturen 147, 1924, p. 102-106
