= Revill (surname) =

Revill is an English surname. Notable people with the surname include:

- Alan Revill (1923–1998), English cricketer
- Clive Revill (1930–2025), New Zealand actor
- Jack Revill, known as Jackmaster (1986–2024), Scottish DJ and record producer
- Jimmy Revill (1891–1917), English footballer
- Lance Revill (born 1953), New Zealand professional boxer, boxing promoter and referee
- Tom Revill (1892–1979), English cricketer and footballer
