= Reveille (Richmond, Virginia) =

Historic house in Virginia, United States

- U.S. National Register of Historic Places
- Virginia Landmarks Register
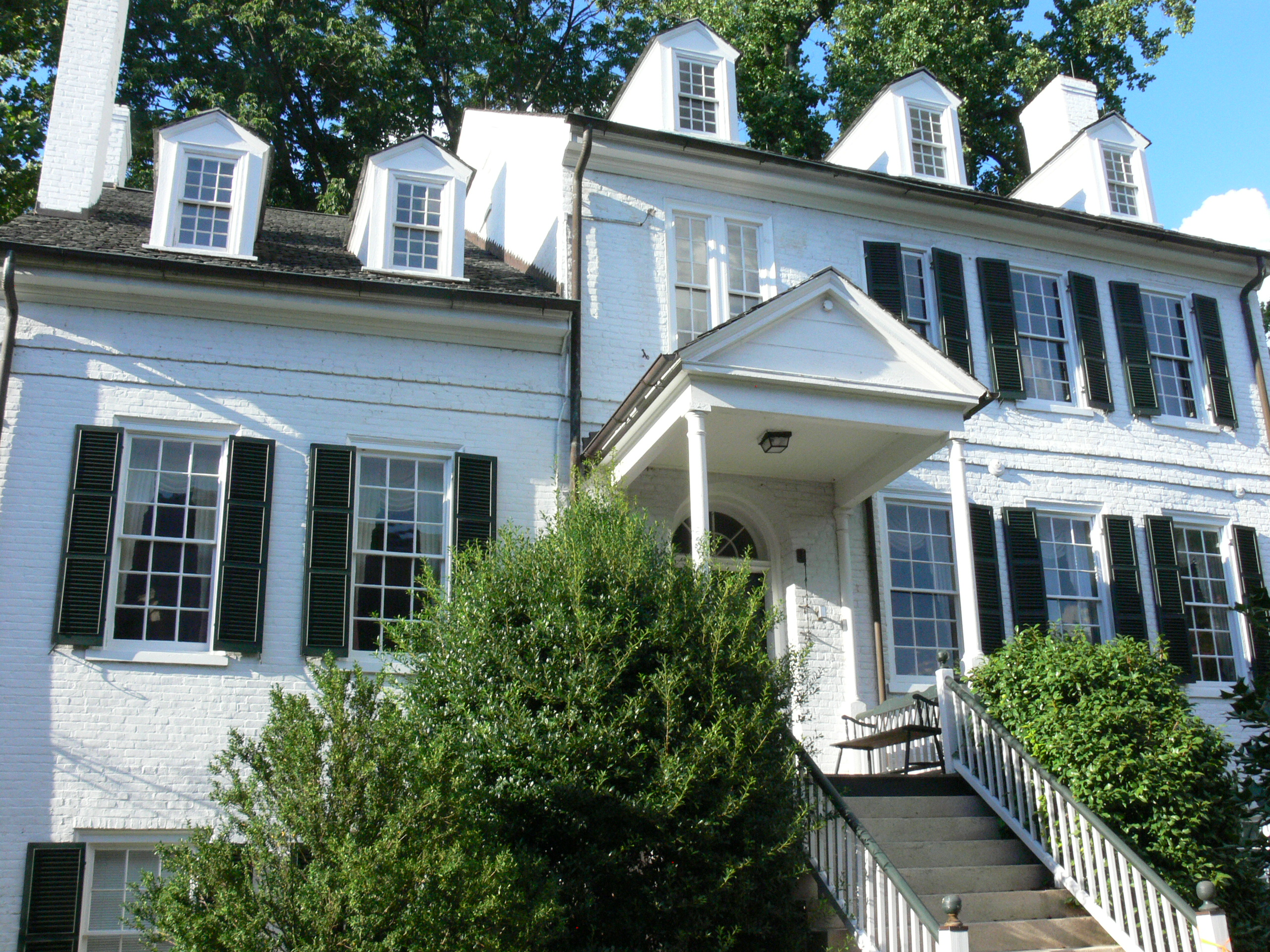
- Reveille, July 2011

- Location within Virginia Location within the United States
- Location: 4200 Cary Street Rd., Richmond, Virginia
- Coordinates: 37°33′41″N 77°29′44″W
- Area: 4 acres (1.6 ha)
- Built: c. 1806, 1839, 1920
- Architectural style: Federal
- NRHP reference No.: 79003293
- VLR No.: 127-0310

Significant dates
- Added to NRHP: February 1, 1979
- Designated VLR: October 17, 1978

Reveille, also known as the Brick House, is a historic home located in Richmond, Virginia. The house consists of three sections. The main 2 1/2-story house dates to about 1806; the 1 1/2-story west wing dates to 1839; and a rear kitchen wing was added to the west wing in 1920. The house is an example of an early 19th-century Federal style country residence. In 1950 the property and house were acquired by the Reveille United Methodist Church.

It was listed on the National Register of Historic Places in 1979.
