= Julien Dupré =

French painter (1851–1910)

Julien Dupré (Dupre)
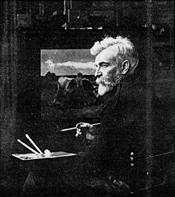
- Julien Dupré
- Born: Julien Dupré; March 18, 1851; Paris, France
- Died: April 1910 (aged 59); Paris, France
- Known for: Painter
- Notable work: The White Cow, Faucheurs de Luzerne, La Recolte des Foins
- Movement: French Academic, Realism
- Awards: Legion of Honour, 1892

Julien Dupré (French pronunciation: [ʒyljɛ̃ dypʁe], March 18, 1851 – April, 1910) was a French painter.

== Life and career ==
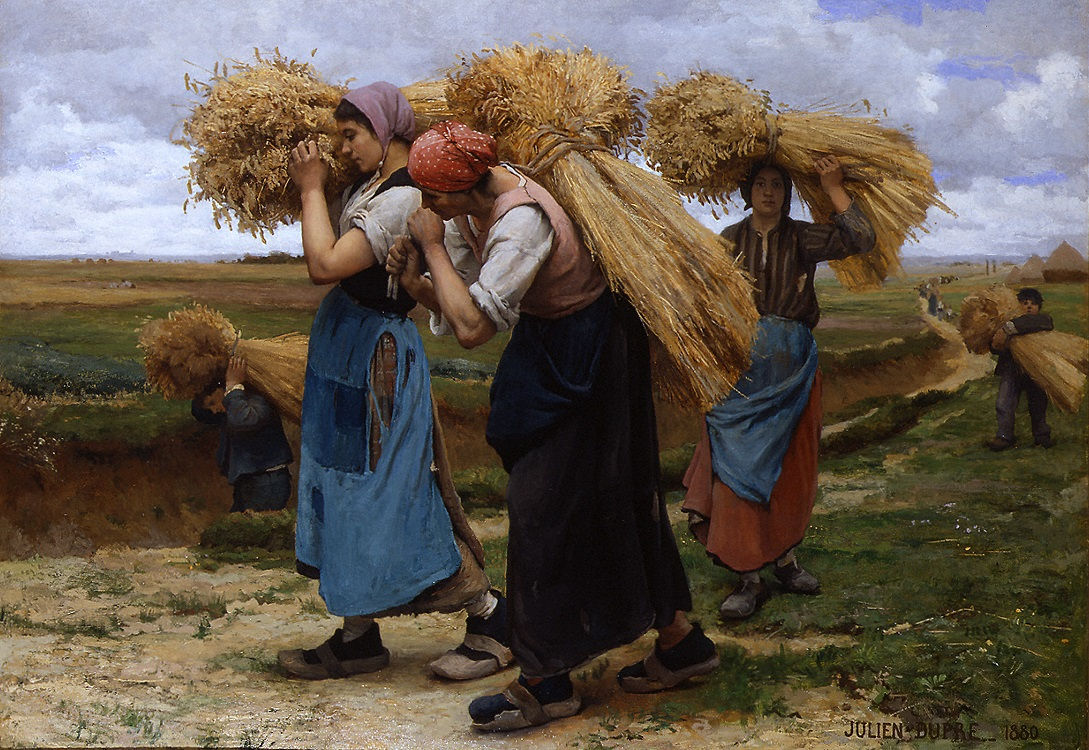
Gleaners, 1880

He was born in Paris on March 18, 1851 to Jean Dupré (a jeweler) and Pauline Bouillié. It was expected that he enter the family business, and to that end Dupré began working in a shop that sold lace. However, his parents were forced to close their shop due to the war of 1870 and the siege of Paris. With time on his hands, Dupré began taking evening courses at the Ecole des Arts Décoratifs and it was through these classes that he gained admission to the École Nationale et Spéciale des Beaux-Arts.

At l'Ecole he studied with Isidore Pils and Henri Lehmann. In the mid-1870s he traveled to Picardy and became a student of the rural genre painter Désiré François Laugée, whose daughter Marie Eléonore Françoise he married in 1876; the year he exhibited his first painting at the Paris Salon.

Dupré received a gold medal at the Exposition Universelle of 1889 in Paris. In 1892, he was awarded the Legion of Honour.

Dupré was teacher to Lucy Scarborough Conant.

Throughout his career Dupré championed the life of the peasant and continued painting scenes in the areas of Normandy and Brittany. He exhibited regularly until his death in April, 1910.

== Works in public collections ==
- The Hay Harvest (1881) - Chimei Museum, Tainan, Taiwan (R.O.C.)
- Haying Scene (1884) - St. Louis Art Museum, St. Louis, Missouri
- The Haymakers (1886) - Worcester Art Museum, Worcester, Massachusetts
- Return From the Fields (n.d.) - Joslyn Art Museum, Omaha, Nebraska
- In Pasture (1882) - Washington University in St. Louis Art Gallery, St. Louis, Missouri
- Haying Scene (1882) - Washington University in St. Louis Art Gallery, St. Louis, Missouri
- Young Woman Watering Cattle - Museum of Fine Arts, Boston, Massachusetts
- Haymaking (1892) - Museum of Fine Arts, Boston, Massachusetts
- Children Feeding Geese (1881) - Museum of Fine Arts, Boston, Massachusetts
- Peasant Girl with Sheep (n.d.) - The Fine Arts Museums of San Francisco, California
- Milking Time (n.d.) - The Fine Arts Museums of San Francisco, California
- Women in the Fields (n.d.) - Bowdoin College Museum of Art, Brunswick, Maine
- The Young Shepherdess (n.d.) - San Diego Museum of Art, San Diego, California
- In the Pasture (1883) - University of Kentucky Art Museum, Lexington. Kentucky
- Le Ballon (1886) - Reading Public Museum and Art Gallery, Reading, Pennsylvania
- The Harvesters (1885) - The Appleton Museum of Art, Ocala, Florida
- The Harvester (c.1880/1) - Huntington Museum of Art, Huntington, West Virginia
- Home From the Pasture (n.d.) - Columbia Museum of Art, Columbia, South Carolina
- Woman Harvesting Hay (n.d.) - Museum of Fine Arts, Houston, Texas
- The White Cow (La vache blanche) (ca. 1890) - Musée d'Orsay, Paris, France
- Les faucheurs du luzerne (1880) - Musée d'Orsay, Paris, France

== Gallery ==
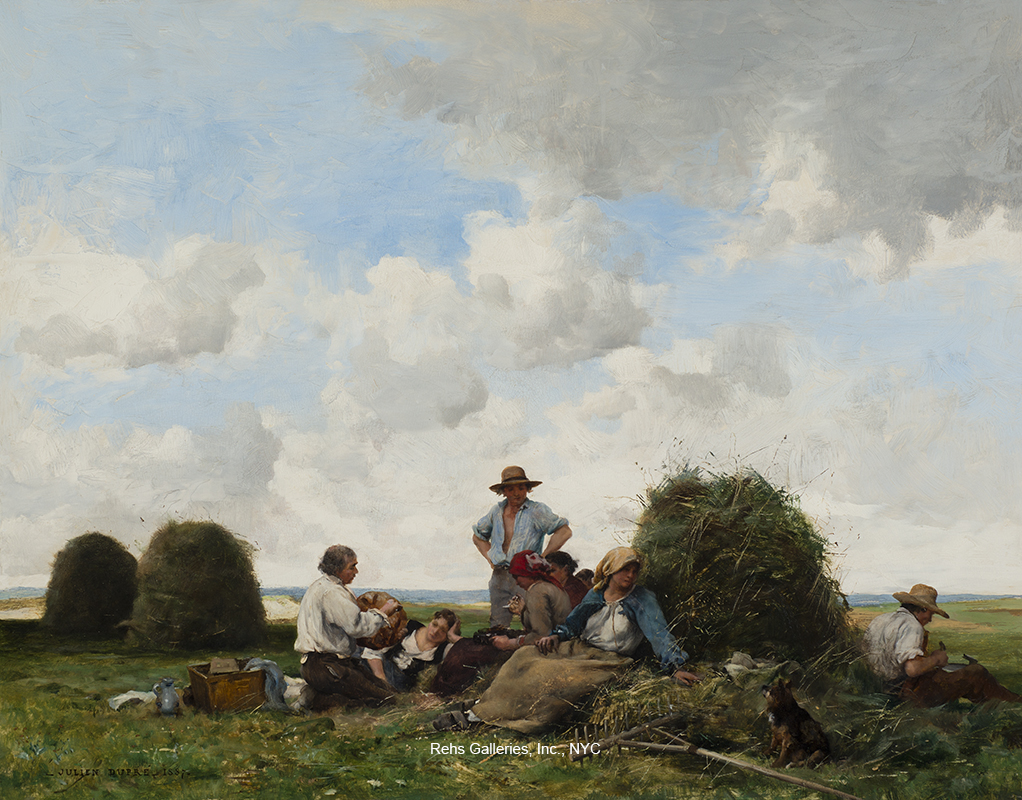
Le repos dans les champs Rehs Galleries, Inc., New York City

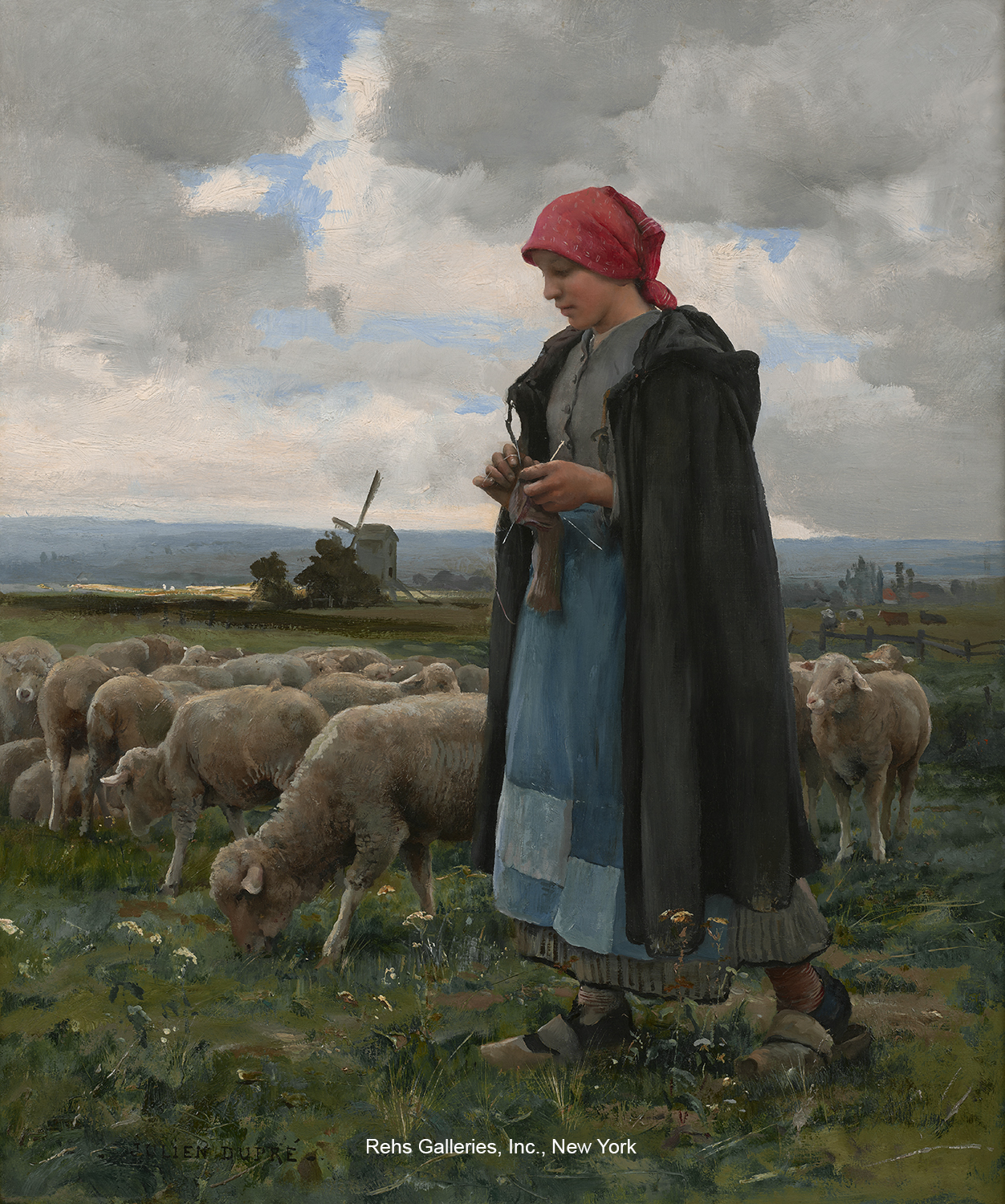
La bergère Rehs Galleries, Inc., New York City

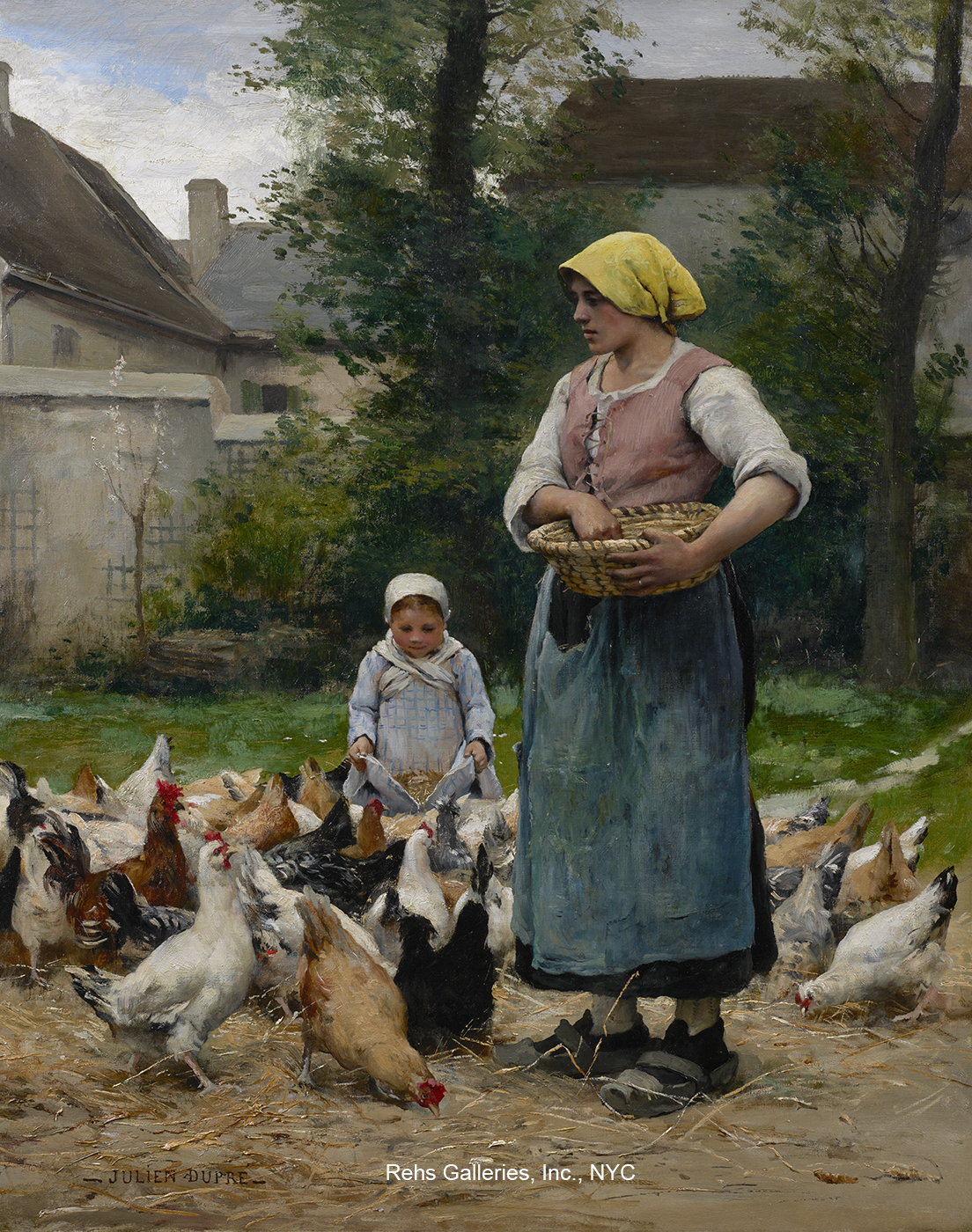
Femme avec des poules Rehs Galleries, Inc., New York City

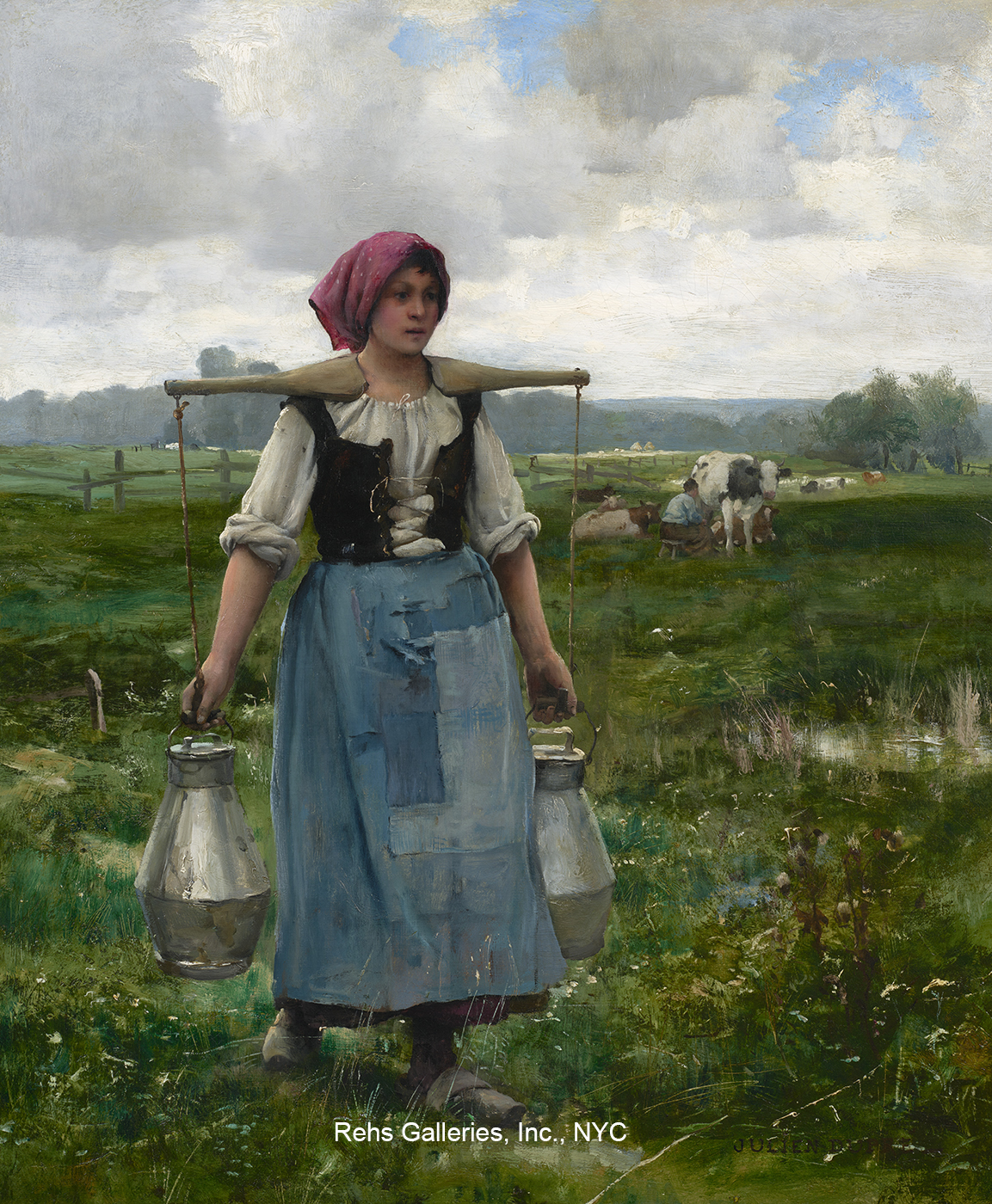
The Milkmaid Rehs Galleries, Inc., New York City

== Bibliography ==
- Rehs, Howard L. (2008), "Julien Dupré: The Making, Unmaking, and Remaking of an Academic Reputation", in Chu, Petra ten-Doesschate; Dixon, Laurinda S. (eds.), Twenty-First-Century Perspectives on Nineteenth-Century Art : Essays in Honor of Gabriel P. Weisberg, Newark, DE: University of Delaware Press, pp. 93–99, ISBN 9780874130119, OCLC 1019978110
