= Protestant Faculty of Theology in Paris =

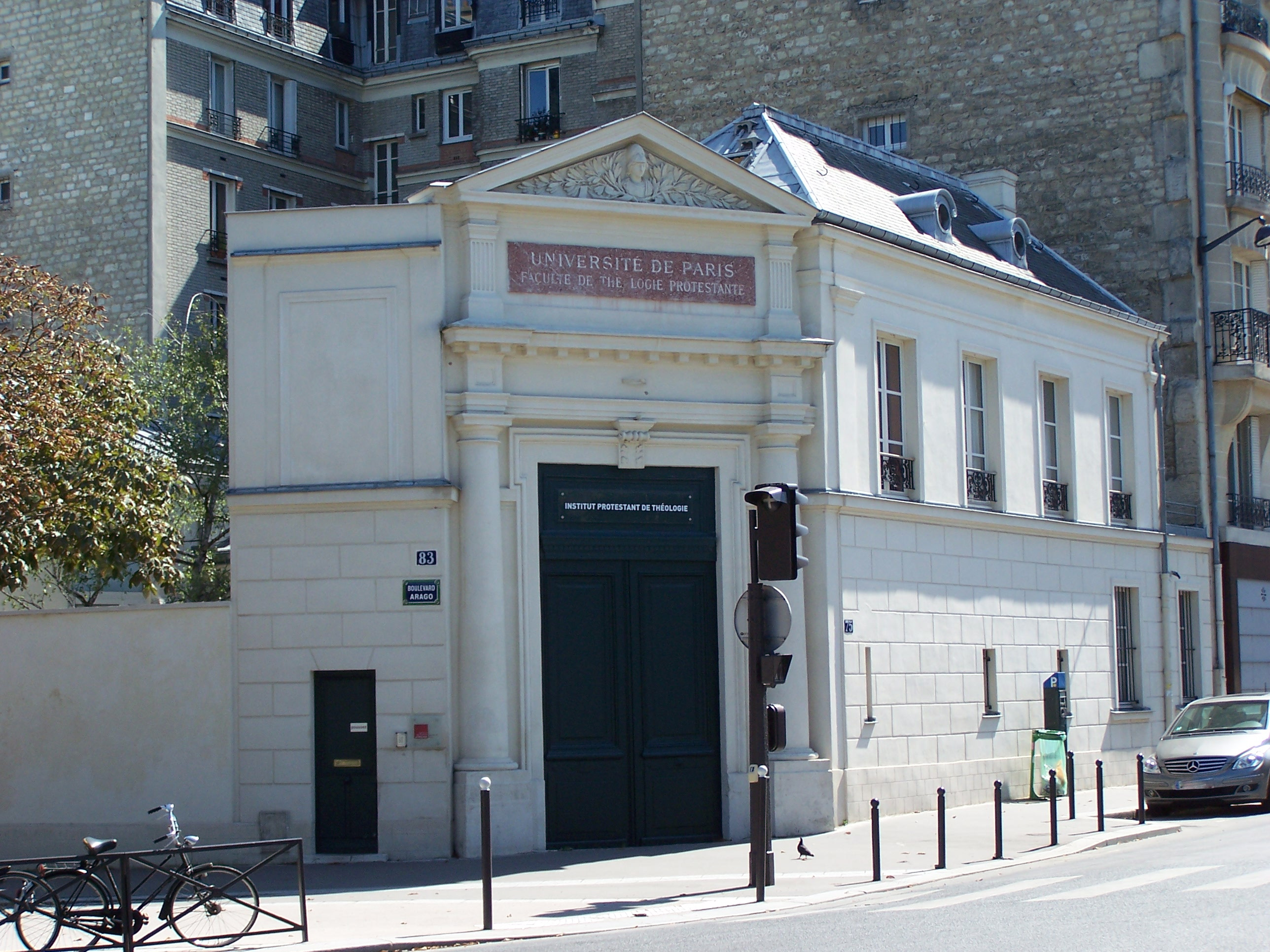
Historical entrance of the Faculté de théologie protestante at 83, boulevard Arago, Paris

The Protestant Faculty of Theology of Paris (French: Faculté de théologie protestante de Paris) is a Protestant institution moved to Paris from Strasbourg in 1877 in the buildings of the former collège Rollin, Rue Lhomond.

Notable professors included Auguste Sabatier, Eugène Ménégoz, Jean Réville and the church historian Amy Gaston Bonet-Maury.
