= Jean Réville =

French Protestant theologian

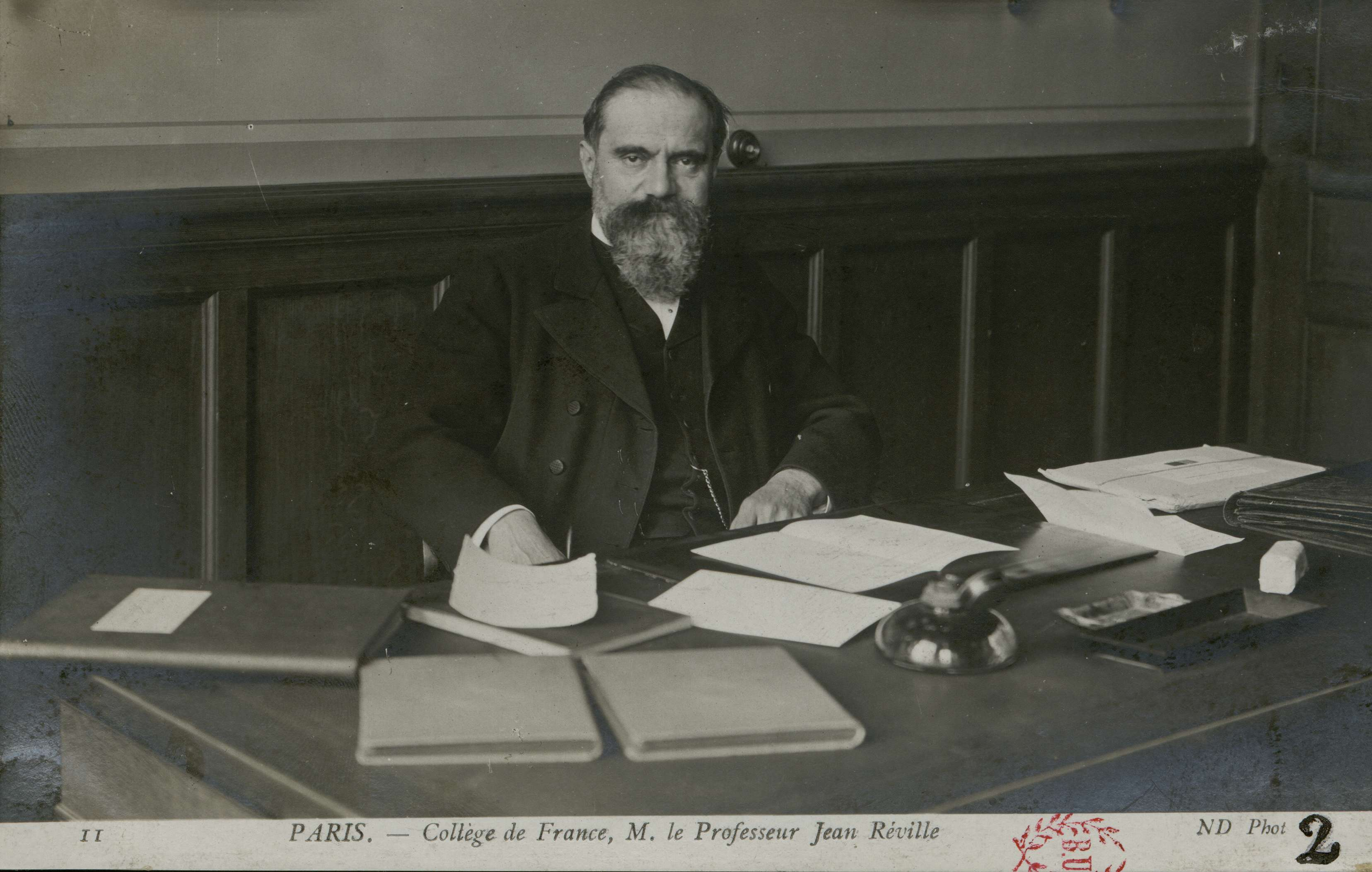
The Collège de France. Professor Jean Réville (Bibliothèque de la Sorbonne, NuBIS)

Jean Réville (6 November 1854 – 6 May 1908) was a French Protestant theologian born in Rotterdam, Netherlands. He was the son of theologian Albert Réville (1826–1906).

He studied theology at Geneva, Berlin and Heidelberg, obtaining his licentiate in theology in Paris (1880). He subsequently became a pastor in Sainte-Suzanne, Doubs, and in 1886 received his doctorate in theology at the Protestant Faculty of Theology in Paris. In 1894 he was appointed professor of patristics to the theological faculty at the Sorbonne.

Réville was a prominent figure in French Liberal Protestantism. From 1884 until his death, he was editor of the Revue de l'Histoire des Religions.

== Works ==
Among his better known publications are the following:

- 1881: La Doctrine du logos dans le quatrième évangile et dans les œuvres de Philon
- 1886: La Religion à Rome sous les Sévères
- 1894: Les Origines de l'Épiscopat
- 1896: Paroles d'un Libre-Croyant
- 1900: Le quatrième Évangile. Son origine et sa valeur historique
- 1903: Le Protestantisme libéral, ses origines, sa nature, sa mission, reprint Théolib Paris 2011 (ISBN 978-2-36500-047-5)
- 1906: Le Prophétisme hébreu
- 1907: Leçon d'ouverture du cours d'Histoire des Religions professé au Collège de France
- 1908: Les origines de l'Eucharistie, Messe, Sainte-Cène
- 1909: Les phases successives de l'histoire des religions
