= Désiré François Laugée =

French painter (1823–1896)

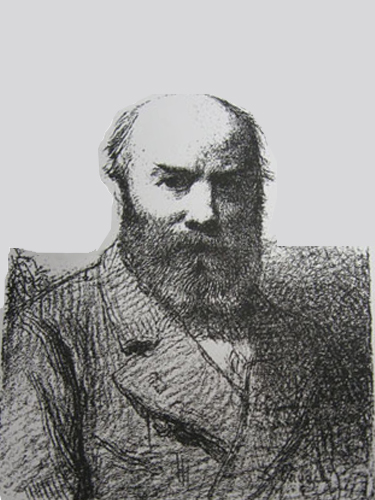
- Désiré François Laugée - self portrait aged 60
- Born: 25 January 1823; Maromme, Seine-Maritime, France
- Died: 24 January 1896 (aged 72); Paris, France
- Occupation: Painter
- Known for: Naturalism

Désiré François Laugée (25 January 1823 – 24 January 1896) was a French painter. His work included portraits and classical religious or historical scenes. His large murals still decorate several churches in Paris. He also made naturalist landscapes and genre paintings of peasants, particularly in his later life. With this work he may be seen as a precursor of the Barbizon school. He achieved great success during his lifetime, although his work has since been largely ignored.

== Early years ==
Désiré-François Laugée was born in Maromme, a village near to Rouen, on 25 January 1823. His parents were Georges François Toussaint Laugée, a clerk, and Eulalie Léger. In 1825 the family moved to Saint-Quentin, Aisne. He attended the Collège des Bons-Enfants, where he showed a talent for drawing at an early age. Laugée enrolled in the Ecole des Beaux-Arts of Saint-Quentin, founded by the pastel artist Maurice Quentin de La Tour. He worked in the studio of Louis Nicolas Lemasle, a pupil of Jacques-Louis David.

Laugée's father wanted him to become a mechanic, but his teacher insisted that would waste a great talent. Eventually his father relented and let Laugée go to the École des Beaux-Arts' in Paris. There he joined the studio of François-Édouard Picot, also a pupil of Jacques Louis David. His family ran into financial difficulty and he considered leaving the school, but Picot gave him the support needed to complete his studies. He submitted his first work to the Salon of 1845. It was a portrait of a father and son, M.G.L. and M.D.L., which some writers have taken to represent his father and himself. (Note: M.G.L. and M.D.L. may stand for M. Georges Laugée and M. Désiré Laugée.)

== Career ==
On 14 May 1850 Laugée married Célestine Marie Malézieux (1825–1909). They would have five children. After his marriage he moved to Nauroy, ten kilometers from Saint-Quentin, where his wife's family lived. When he became famous he was called the "Master of Nauroy". (Note: Laugée was called the Maître de Nauroy, not the Maire de Nauroy. He was never mayor of the town.)

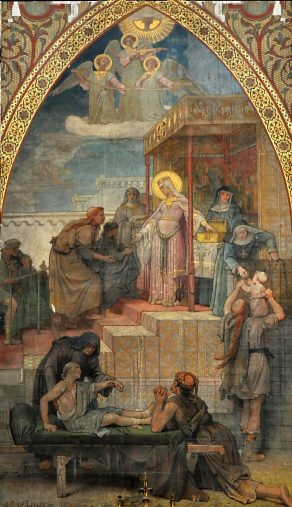
Sainte-Clotilde secourant les pauvres Sainte-Clotilde, Paris

Laugée won commissions for portraits, and regularly submitted portraits to the Salon until 1859. At the same time, he worked on a variety of subjects including historical and religious paintings. As his artistic career evolved, Laugée became increasingly interested in landscapes and peasant genre subjects. However, most of the works he submitted to the Salons were religious, and were often bought by the state. His Saint Louis Washing the Feet of the Poor for the Salon of 1863 was an example. Other Salon entries were based on works that had been commissioned by churches, including murals. At the Salon, Laugée won the 3rd class medal in 1851, 2nd class medal in 1855, rappel in 1859, 1st class medal in 1861 and rappel in 1863.

Laugée's historical and religious paintings became much sought after. Édouard Manet's Incident in a Bullfight has been compared to Laugée's incident in the Polish Wars of 1863, since lost. He was made a Chevalier of the Legion of Honor in 1865. At the Société des Artistes Français he was made hors concours, meaning that his work did not have to be reviewed by a jury. Laugée was one of the artists commissioned to decorate the interior of the dome of the Bourse de commerce in 1888–89 with paintings that represented the four compass points and the five continents. He died in his studio home at 15 bis boulevard Lannes in the 16th arrondissement of Paris on 24 January 1896. He is buried in the family vault in the Passy cemetery.

Laugée's's son, Georges Laugée, also became a painter. The Barbizon artist Julien Dupré spent time in rural Picardy in the 1870s as Laugée's pupil, and in 1876 married Laugée's daughter Marie Eléanore Françoise.

== Work ==
Throughout his life Laugée was pulled between the academic tradition of his early years and the growing influence of the romantic Barbizon school and Impressionism, although he did not join the newer schools. He undertook many commissioned portraits, several great religious paintings, and realistic paintings of the countryside and peasant life. In his last years almost all his work represented nature and country life. Eugene Montrosier wrote of Laugée in 1884 that he was,

...a varied, original, prolific, and often very powerful painter. He has a gift for great pompous and theatrical compositions. He knows how to infuse sentiment and thought into his religious scenes; he even impregnates them with an accent of faith which enhances them with a touch of passion. He mainly paints ceilings in which he combines the effects with the severe laws of aerial perspective. He is, basically, full of fortunate talents. I find too much perfection in his rural scenes. The characters who camp outdoors under the bite of the summer sun are too delicate, too elegant, they lack the native harshness that the furrow communicates to those who dig it, that the field loaded with ears of wheat gives to those who reap it. I would like to see the peasants of Millet a bit more often.

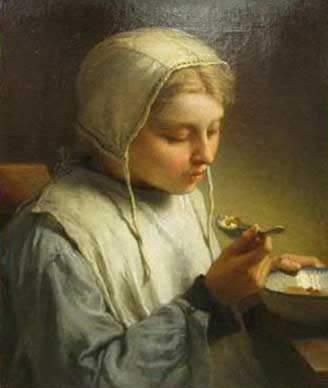
Young girl in bonnet

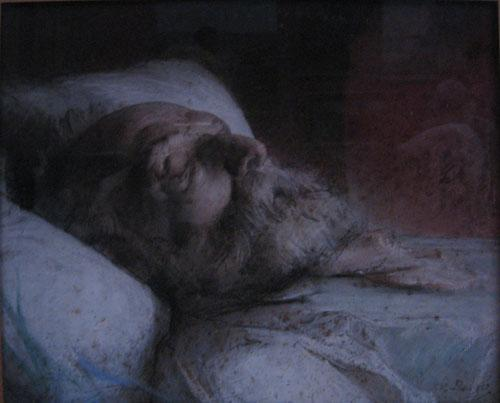
Victor Hugo

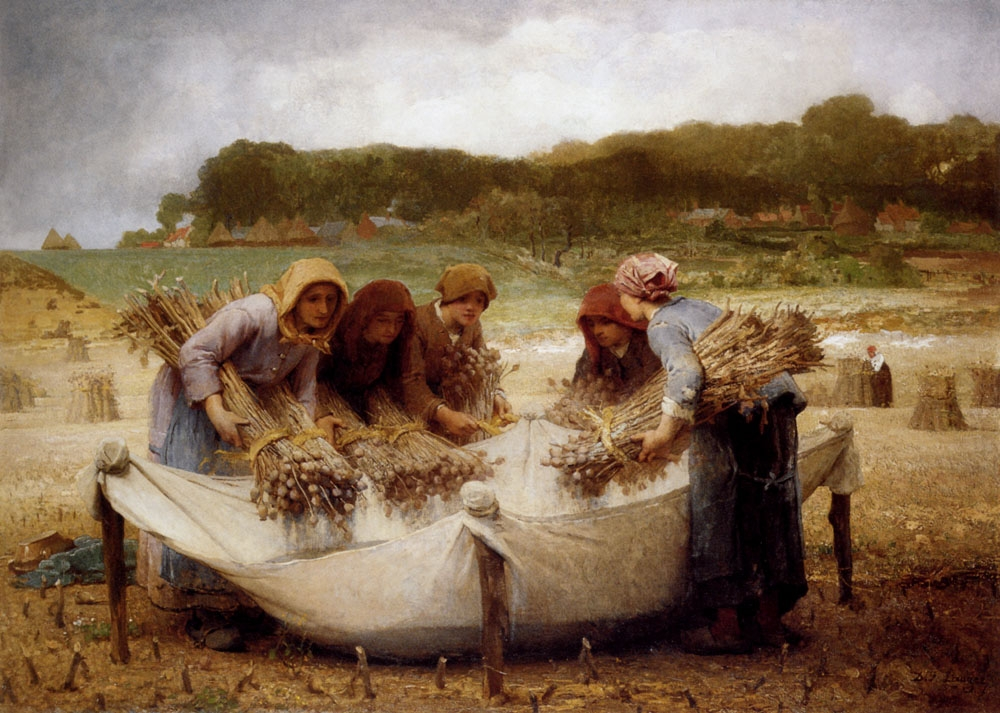
The Poppy Harvest

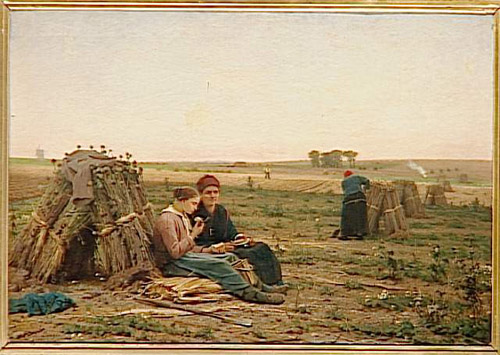
Le goûter des cueillettes d’oeillettes

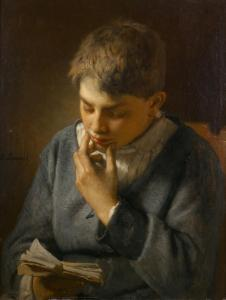
Portrait de Paul Donatien Malezieux

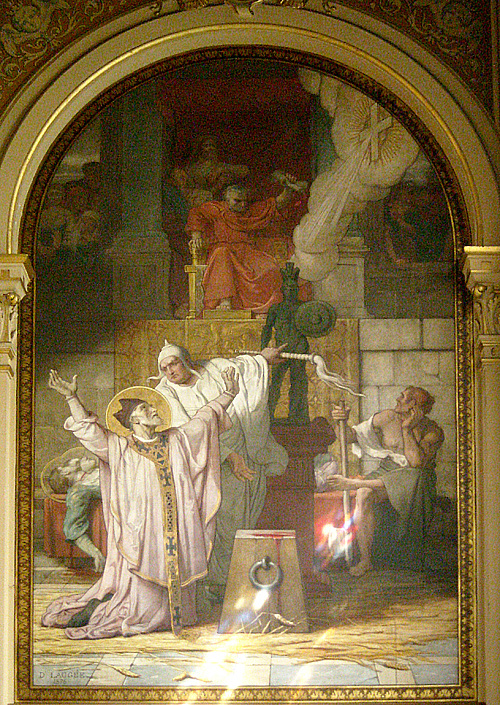
Mort de Saint Denis l’Aréopagite (1876) Sainte-Trinité, Paris

Salon submissions include:

- Portrait of a father and son, M.G.L. and M.D.L. – Salon of 1845
- La Mort de Zurbaran (The Death of Zurbaran) – third class medal at the Salon of 1851
- Siège de Saint-Quentin (Siege of Saint-Quentin) – Salon of 1852
- Mort de Guillaume le Conquérant (Death of Guillaume the Conqueror) – second class medal at the Salon of 1855
- Sainte Elisabeth de France (Saint Elizabeth of France) – Salon of 1857
- La Récolte des Oeillettes, Picardie (Poppy Harvest, Picardy) – Salon of 1861
- Saint Louis Lavant les Pieds aux Pauvres (Saint Louis Washing the Feet of the Poor) – Salon of 1863
- Pour la soupe (still life of vegetables) – Salon of 1883

Decorative works in churches include

- Chapel of the Virgin in the church of Saint Pierre du Gros Caillou
- Chapel of St. Peter and St. Paul in the Basilique Saint-Quentin
- Chapel of St. Clotilde in the church of Sainte Clotilde
- Chapel of St. Dénis in La Trinité

Like most second-generation French realists, Laugée was highly successful and esteemed during his lifetime but the cognoscenti of the first half of the 20th century rejected his work.

== Sources ==
- "Bourse de commerce". Mérimée (in French). Ministère de la Culture (France).
- "Désiré François Laugée (1823–1896)". Rehs Galleries.
- Dixon, Laurinda S. (2008). Twenty-first-century Perspectives on Nineteenth-century Art: Essays in Honor of Gabriel P. Weisberg. Associated University Presse. ISBN 978-0-87413-011-9.
- Elderfield, John (2006). Manet and the Execution of Maximilian. The Museum of Modern Art. ISBN 978-0-87070-423-9.
- Jouan, Jérémie Pierre (2006). "Désiré François Laugée : biographie". Peintres et Sculptures (in French).
- Montrosier, Eugène (1884). "D. Laugée". Les artistes modernes (in French). Vol. 4: Peintres divers. H. Launette.
- Stranahan, Clara Cornelia Harrison (1888). A History of French painting from its earliest to its latest practice: including an account of the French academy of painting, its salons, schools of instruction and regulations. Scribner. p. 441.
