= Erik Lönnroth =

Swedish historian

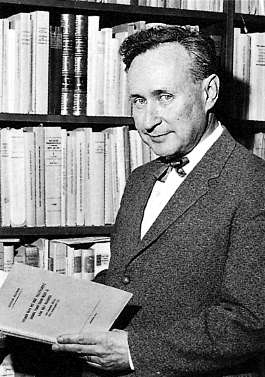
Erik Lönnroth

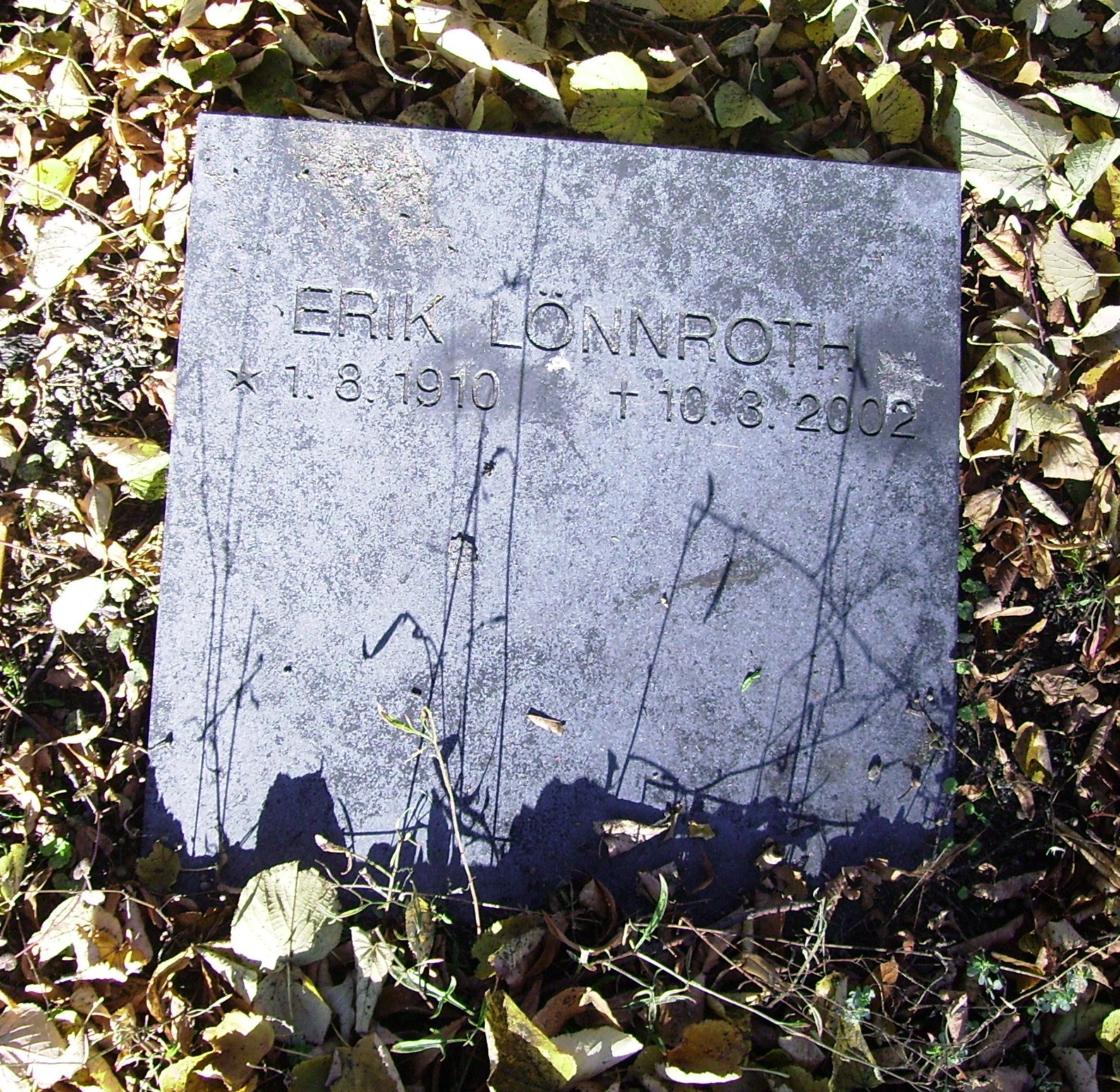
Erik Lönnroth's tombstone at Östra kyrkogården, Gothenburg.

Erik Lönnroth (1 August 1910 in Gothenburg – 10 March 2002) was one of the most notable Swedish historians of the 20th century. He was a life member of the Swedish Academy from 1962 and member of various faculties.

== Background ==
Nils Erik Magnus Lönnroth was born in Gothenburg and obtained a PhD in history at Gothenburg University College in 1934 at 24 years of age. His thesis treated Thomas Simonsson, the medieval Swedish theologian and Bishop of the Diocese of Strängnäs. He was professor at Uppsala University between 1942-1953 and then at Gothenburg University between 1953 and 1977.

== Career ==
Lönnroth was an influential author. The subjects he did historical research includes the Kalmar Union, Lawrence of Arabia, King Gustav III of Sweden and the rebel leader Engelbrekt Engelbrektsson. Lönnroth took the history subject to a new level in Sweden. He developed and refined the critical theory of historiography that his mentor, Curt Weibull, had introduced. He also did pioneering work on the medieval economical history of Sweden and on psychohistory.

== Personal life ==
Erik Lönnroth was the son of Magnus Lönnroth, District Secretary of Swedish State Railways in Gothenburg, and Gerda (Kjellberg) Lönnroth . He married in 1934 to Ebba Lagercrantz (1908-1980). They were the parents of Swedish literary critic, Lars Lönnroth and Swedish politician Johan Lönnroth, as well as Louise Lönnroth, Ivar Lönnroth, and Peter Lönnroth.

== Honours ==
Lönnroth became a life member of the Swedish Academy in 1962. In 1999, he received an honorary doctorate from the University of Greifswald's Faculty of Arts.

== Selected works ==
- Sverige och Kalmarunionen: 1397–1457 (1934)
- Statsmakt och statsfinans i det medeltida Sverige (1940)
- En annan uppfattning: Essayer (1949)
- Lawrence of Arabia: An Historical Appreciation (1956)
- Statsmakt och statsfinans i det medeltida Sverige: Studier over skattevasen och lansforvaltning (1984)
- Scandinavians: Selected historical essays (1977)
- Den stora rollen: Kung Gustaf III spelad av honom själv (1986)
- Tidens flykt: Stora historiska forandringar och manniskor som har levat i dem (1998)

Cultural offices
Preceded by Fredrik Böök	Swedish Academy, Seat No.10; 1962-2002	Succeeded by Peter Englund
