= Jean-Claude Arnault =

Swedish photographer

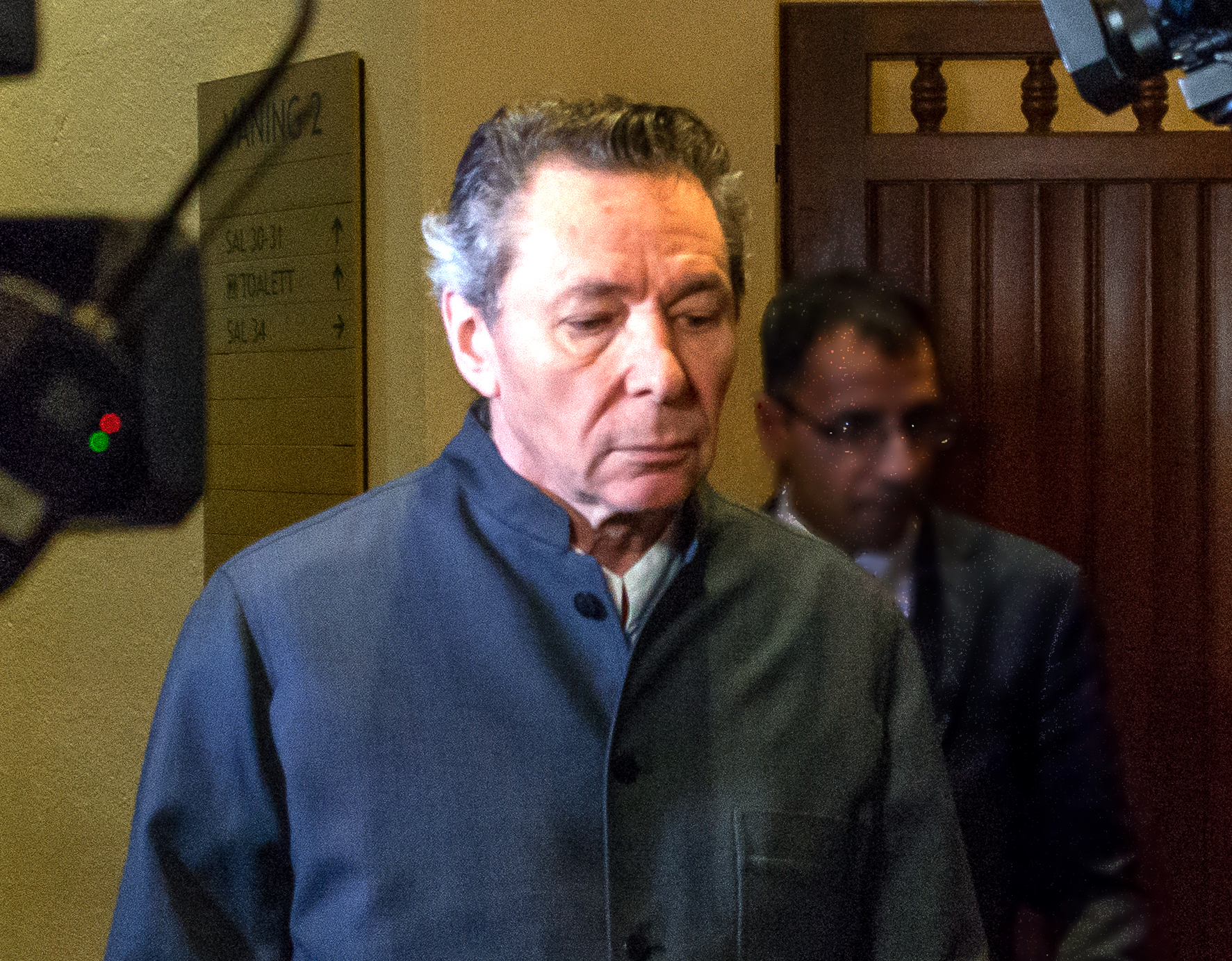
- Arnault in Stockholm District Court during the last day of the trial in September 2018
- Born: 15 August 1946; Marseille, France
- Occupations: Photographer; Artistic director
- Spouse: Katarina Frostenson
- Penalty: 2 years and 6 months

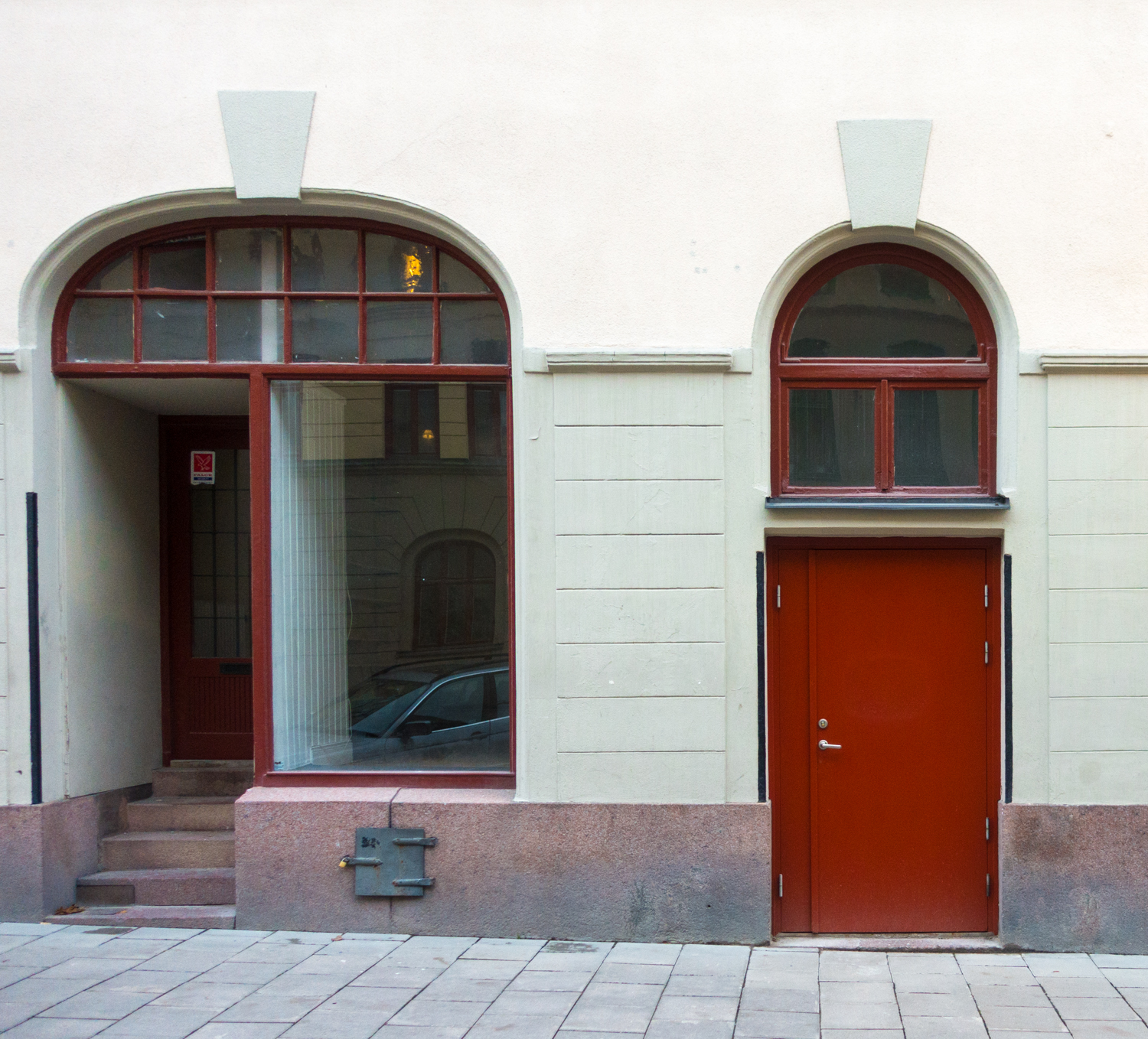
The entrance to Forum.

Jean-Claude Arnault (French pronunciation: [ʒɑ̃ klod aʁno]; born 15 August 1946), known in Swedish media as kulturprofilen ("the cultural personage", but commonly translated literally as "the cultural profile"), is a French-Swedish convicted sex offender. He worked as a photographer and is the former artistic director of the cultural center Forum – Nutidsplats för kultur ("Forum – Contemporary Scene for Culture") Stockholm.

Arnault became widely known after several accusations of sexual assault levelled against him precipitated a scandal resulting in the resignations of members of the Nobel Committee and the postponement of the 2018 Nobel Prize for Literature. These events occurred against the background of the Me Too movement. In 2018, he was found guilty of two sexual assaults and sentenced to two years and six months in prison. He appealed the sentence to the Supreme Court of Sweden on the basis of judicial disqualification. On 5 May 2019, the court decided not to grant leave to appeal and the verdict from the lower court was subsequently enforced.

== Life ==
Arnault was born in Marseille, France. He won Natur & Kultur's cultural award in 2008. He is married to former Swedish Academy member Katarina Frostenson.

== Sexual assault allegations and rape conviction ==
In November 2017, in the wake of the Me Too movement, eighteen women accused Arnault of sexual assault, alleged to have occurred over the course of 20 years. This caused the Swedish Academy to break all financial ties with him. Swedish media have reported that he groped Swedish Crown Princess Victoria at an academy event in 2006.

At the same time, his wife Katarina Frostenson was accused of corruption for not informing the Swedish Academy about conflicts of interest when distributing subsidies for her husband's cultural center. The Swedish Academy believes he leaked the names of seven winners of the Nobel Prize in literature.

Arnault denied all allegations. On 1 October 2018, Arnault was convicted of one count of rape and sentenced to two years in prison as well as a SEK 115,000 fine. Arnault appealed the verdict. On 3 December 2018, the Svea Court of Appeal increased the sentence and found Arnault guilty of two counts of rape and sentenced him to two years and six months in prison. The fine was raised to SEK 215,000.

Following his conviction, Arnault was also stripped of his knighthood in the Order of the Polar Star, which he had been granted in 2015.

== Repercussions ==
In the wake of the accusations, the Swedish Academy suffered a considerable blow to its reputation. Academy member Klas Östergren left the academy and academy members Sara Danius, Peter Englund, Kjell Espmark and Frostenson ceased taking part in the academy's work, leading to concerns about the future of the academy. On 27 April 2018, Sara Stridsberg left the academy in solidarity with Sara Danius. Due to the scandal and a perceived tarnishing of the Nobel Committee's reputation, the Nobel Prize in Literature was postponed until 2019. The New Academy Prize in Literature was created as an alternative to the 2018 Nobel Prize in Literature.

== Imprisonment ==
Arnault was an inmate in Skogome Prison, a high-security prison for sex offenders; Swedish media reported that he was disciplined for breaking prison rules by making sexist comments towards a female warder. In late 2019 he was transferred to another prison at Tillberga. Arnault was conditionally released from prison in May 2020.
