= Gunnel Vallquist =

Swedish writer and translator

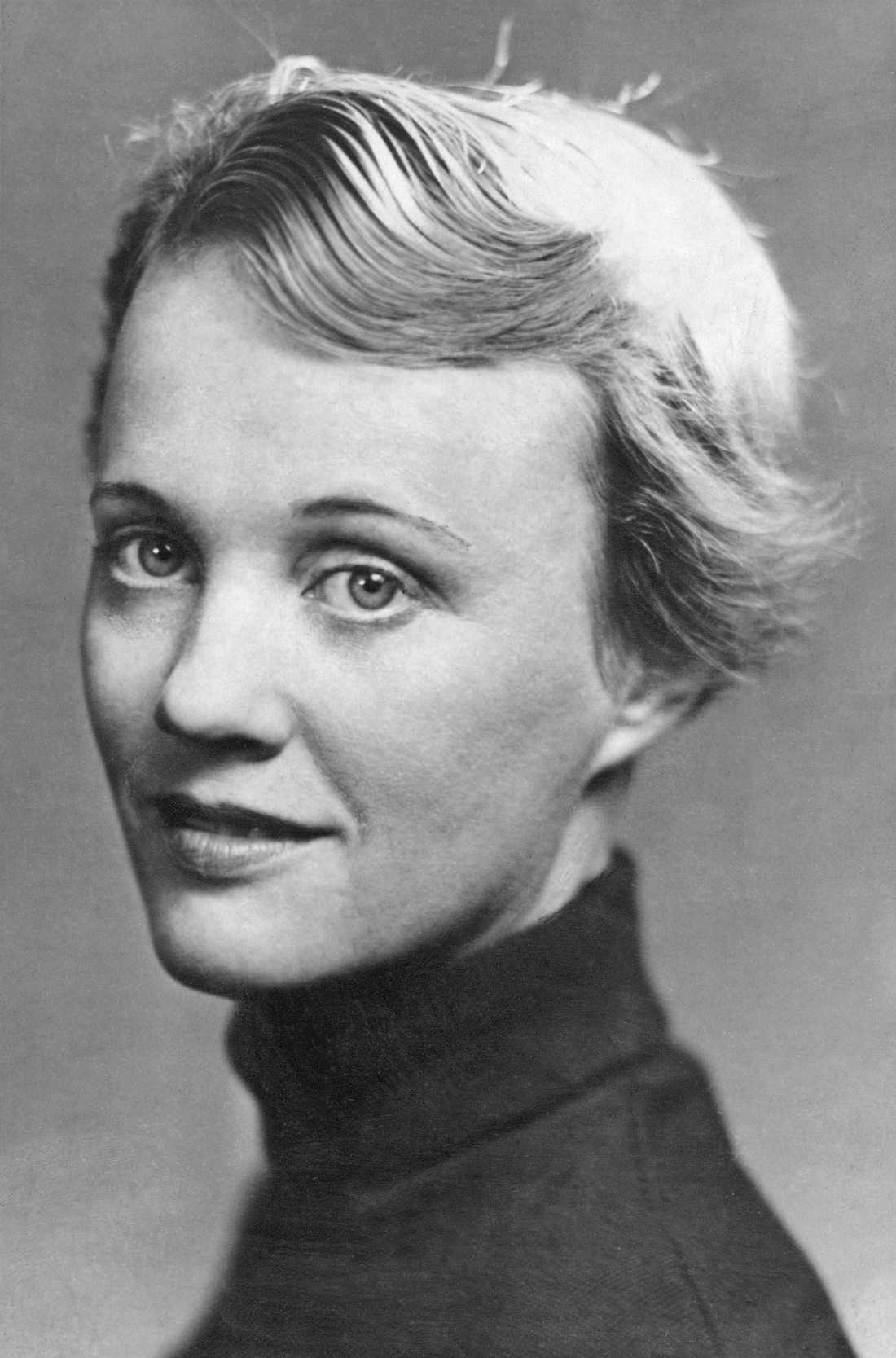
- Gunnel Vallquist in 1954
- Born: 19 June 1918; Stockholm, Sweden
- Died: 11 January 2016 (aged 97); Stockholm, Sweden
- Education: Uppsala University
- Occupations: writer, translator, linguist, literary critic
- Spouses: Folke Diurlin (m. 1936–1939)
- Parent: Lily Vallquist (mother)
- Relatives: Anne-Marie Edéus (sister)
- Writing career
- Notable awards: Litteris et Artibus (2005)

Member of the Swedish Academy (Seat No. 13)
- In office 20 December 1982 – 11 January 2016
- Preceded by: Anders Österling
- Succeeded by: Sara Stridsberg

Gunnel Vallquist (19 June 1918 – 11 January 2016) was a Swedish writer and translator. She was elected a member of the Swedish Academy. Vallquist wrote several essays on Catholic religion in contemporary times, and translated the seven-part novel In Search of Lost Time by Marcel Proust into Swedish.

== Life ==
Born in Stockholm in 1918, Vallquist's father was Lieutenant Colonel Gunnar Vallquist and her mother was translator Lily Vallquist. She was educated at an all-girls’ school in Skövde Gunnel, but finished school and graduated in Stockholm. The family had moved after Gunnar Vallquist's death. Vallquist was married for a short time to an officer. After her marriage, in 1939, she converted to Catholicism, at the Sankta Ingridshem chapel of the French Dominican sisters. She worked as a secretary in the Swedish army, before moving to Uppsala in 1941 to study Nordic and Romance languages. She earned a master's degree in 1946 at Uppsala University.

After the Second World War, Vallquist lived in Paris, where she wrote magazine reviews, and translated literature from French to Swedish. Her translations include works by Bernanos, Balzac, Claudel, Descartes, and Weil. In 1950 she began to translate the seven-piece novel In Search of Lost Time by Marcel Proust into Swedish, which took her thirty years to complete. She lived in Rome from 1955 to 1958. Vallquist wrote several essays on Catholic religion in contemporary times, among them reports from the Second Vatican Council. In the 1970s, Vallquist was part of a bible commission charged with making a new translation of the New Testament, but she resigned in protest against the way the translation was being carried out.

Vallquist was elected a member of the Swedish Academy in 1982. She died in Bromma in 2016.

== Bibliography ==
- Något att leva för (1956)
- Giorgio La Pira : borgmästare och profet (1957)
- Ett bländande mörker (1958)
- Till dess dagen gryr : anteckningar 1950–1958 (1959)
- Vägar till Gud (1960)
- Den oförstådda kärleken (1961)
- Helgonens svar (1963)
- Dagbok från Rom. D. 1, Journalistminnen från Vatikankonciliet (1964)
- Dagbok från Rom. D. 2, Reformation i Vatikanen? (1964)
- Dagbok från Rom. D. 3, Kyrkligt, världsligt, kvinnligt (1965)
- Dagbok från Rom. D. 4, Uppbrott (1966)
- Kyrkor i uppbrott (1968)
- Interkommunion? : synpunkter på en kristen livsfråga (1969)
- Följeslagare (1975)
- Morgon och afton (1976)
- Sökare och siare : essayer (1982)
- Anders Österling : inträdestal i Svenska akademien (1982)
- Steg på vägen (1983)
- Notiser om Franska akademien (1985)
- Helena Nyblom (1987)
- Den romerske kuries metoder (1993)
- Katolska läroår : Uppsala-Paris-Rom (1995)
- Vad väntar vi egentligen på? : texter om kristen enhet 1968–2002
- Guds ord till människorna : skrift och tradition enligt Dei Verbum (2007); co-authors: Rainer Carls & Birger Olsson
- Texter i urval (2008)
- Herre, låt mig få brinna : anteckningar 1950–1958 (2009)

Cultural offices
Preceded by Anders Österling	Swedish Academy, Seat No.13; 1982–2016	Succeeded by Sara Stridsberg
