= Sara Danius =

Swedish academic (1962–2019)

Sara Maria Danius
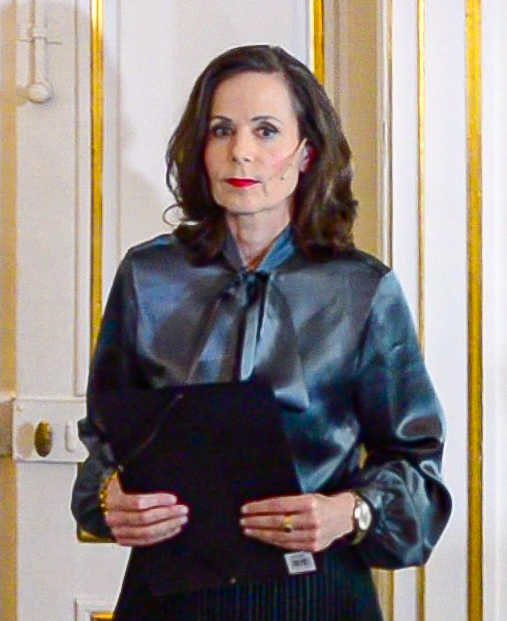
- Danius in 2017
- Born: Sara Maria Danius; 5 April 1962; Täby, Sweden
- Died: 12 October 2019 (aged 57); Stockholm, Sweden
- Spouse: Stefan Jonsson (m. 1989–2010)
- Children: 1

Education
- Education: Uppsala University; Duke University; University of Nottingham; Stockholm University
- Thesis: The Senses of Modernism: Technology, Perception and Modernist Aesthetics (1997)
- Doctoral advisor: Fredric Jameson

Member of the Swedish Academy (Seat No. 7)
- In office 20 December 2013 – 26 February 2019
- Preceded by: Knut Ahnlund
- Succeeded by: Åsa Wikforss

Permanent Secretary of the Swedish Academy
- In office May 2015 – April 2018
- Preceded by: Peter Englund
- Succeeded by: Anders Olsson

Sara Maria Danius (5 April 1962 – 12 October 2019) was a Swedish literary critic, philosopher, and scholar of literature and aesthetics. Danius was professor of aesthetics at Södertörn University, docent of literature at Uppsala University and professor in literary science at Stockholm University.

Danius was a member of the Swedish Academy and its first female permanent secretary. She was one of the central figures in the 2018 controversies resulting in the cancellation of the Nobel Prize in Literature that year and the following restructuring of the academy.

== Early life and education ==
Danius was the daughter of author Anna Wahlgren (1942-2022) and Lars Danius (1907–1996). She was the oldest of nine full and half siblings. She went to Åva gymnasium in Täby, where she studied natural science. She played basketball in Elitserien, the highest league in Sweden, and continued to play on a recreational level throughout her life. In 1981–82, she worked as a certified croupier and dealer at casinos in Stockholm.

Danius graduated from Stockholm University in 1986. She received her Master of Arts in critical theory at the University of Nottingham in 1989. She lived in the United States for ten years and, in 1997, received a PhD from Duke University. In 1999 she received a PhD from Uppsala University. In 2004–2005, Danius was a Fellow at the Swedish Collegium for Advanced Study in Uppsala, Sweden as part of the Pro Futura Scientia Program. She published on the relationship between literature and society and wrote about Marcel Proust, Gustave Flaubert, and James Joyce.

== Career ==
Danius was a literary critic for the Swedish daily newspaper Dagens Nyheter from 1986. In 2008, she became professor of aesthetics at Södertörn University and docent of literature at Uppsala University. She was an executive member of the Royal Swedish Academy of Letters since 2010, and in 2013 became professor in literary science at Stockholm University.

Perseverance, self-criticism, inquisitiveness. I'm not particularly curious, but I can become obsessed with certain things. I have realized I'm something of a nerd.

— Danius about her career in a 2013 interview

Danius announces the Nobel Prize in Literature to Bob Dylan, 2016.

In March 2013, Danius was elected to the Swedish Academy, succeeding Knut Ahnlund on chair 7. Danius was formally installed in the academy at a ceremony on 20 December 2013. She took over the post as permanent secretary of the academy from Peter Englund on 1 June 2015.

She played a central role in awarding the literature Nobel to Bob Dylan. This was the second time a songwriter won the Nobel Prize in Literature, the first since Rabindranath Tagore won it in 1913. The award caused some controversy, particularly among writers arguing that the literary merits of Dylan's work are not equal to those of some of his peers.

She was asked to resign from her position and left the academy on 12 April 2018, against the background of critique over the academy's handling of the Me Too-related Jean-Claude Arnault scandal. The scandal evolved into the 2018 controversies resulting in the cancellation of the Nobel Prize in Literature that year and the following restructuring of the academy.

Two former permanent secretaries, Sture Allén and Horace Engdahl, called Danius a weak leader in her handling of the affair. On 26 February 2019 she resigned from her seat at the Swedish Academy. Her move came after several academy members tried to sweep the scandal under the rug, prompting the resignation of three academy members "in disgust."

== Personal life ==
Danius was interested in fashion. At the Nobel Banquets she wore specially designed dresses by Pär Engsheden and inspired by three authors she admired: Marcel Proust, Honoré de Balzac and Virginia Woolf. Her signature garment, a pussy bow blouse, became a symbol to wear for those who supported her during the Swedish Academy crisis.

From 1989 to 2010, she was married to author Stefan Jonsson. They had a son named Leo.

Danius died on 12 October 2019, aged 57, after having suffered from breast cancer for several years.

== Bibliography ==
- Försök om litteratur, Stockholm: Bonnier, 1998. ISBN 9789100567569.
- Prousts motor, Stockholm: Bonnier, 2000. ISBN 9789100571061.
- The senses of modernism: technology, perception, and aesthetics, Ithaca: Cornell University Press, 2002. ISBN 0-8014-3899-3.
- The prose of the world: Flaubert and the art of making things visible, Uppsala: Acta Universitatis Upsaliensis, 2006. ISBN 91-554-6599-4
- Voices: contemporary ceramic art from Sweden, Stockholm: Carlsson, 2006. ISBN 91-7203-778-4.
- Proust-Benjamin : om fotografin, 2011. ISBN 978-91-86883-05-8.
- Näsa för nyheter : essä om James Joyce, 2013. ISBN 978-91-87219-02-3.
- Den blå tvålen: Romanen och konsten att göra saker och ting synliga, 2013. ISBN 978-91-0-012049-8.
- Husmoderns död och andra texter, Stockholm: Bonnier, 2014. ISBN 9789100171971.
- Om Bob Dylan, 2018. ISBN 9789100177812.

Cultural offices
Preceded by Knut Ahnlund	Swedish Academy, Seat No.7; 2013–2019	Succeeded by Åsa Wikforss
