= Torkel Klingberg =

Swedish neuroscientist

Torkel Klingberg is a professor of cognitive neuroscience at the Karolinska Institutet in Stockholm, Sweden. He is the author of three books in Swedish, translated into English by Neil Betteridge and Kathy Saranpa, namely The Overflowing Brain: Information Overload and the Limits of Working Memory, The Learning Brain: Memory and Brain Development in Children and Why Learn?: The Importance of Human Knowledge in the Age of AI (coauthored with Åsa Wikforss). His research testing the hypothesis that playing memory games such as N-back also improves broader skills is controversial. He was one of the founders of Cogmed, but has currently no financial relationships with the company. He is executive director of Cognition Matters, a project that provides free digital cognitive training tools for children worldwide.
