= Ludvig Manderström =

Swedish diplomat (1806–1873)

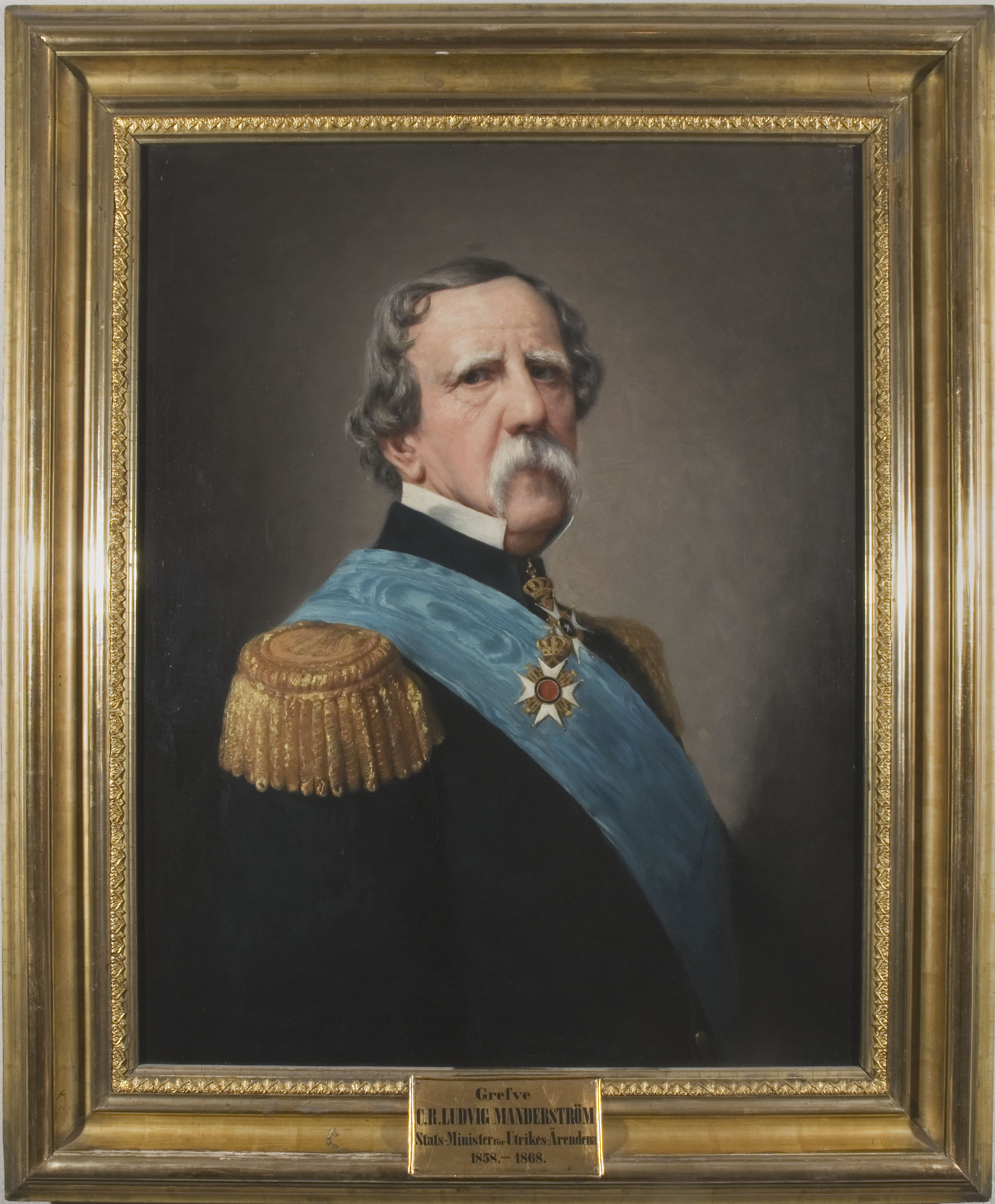
Ludvig Manderström, painting by Johan Wilhelm Gertner

Christofer Rutger Ludvig Manderström (22 January 1806 – 18 August 1873) was the Swedish–Norwegian prime minister of foreign affairs between 1858 and 1868.

He was elected a member of the Royal Swedish Academy of Sciences in 1848, and of the Swedish Academy (seat number 15) in 1852.

Cultural offices
Preceded by Johan David Valerius	Swedish Academy, Seat No.15; 1852–1873	Succeeded by Anton Niklas Sundberg
