= Åsa Wikforss =

Swedish professor of theoretical philosophy

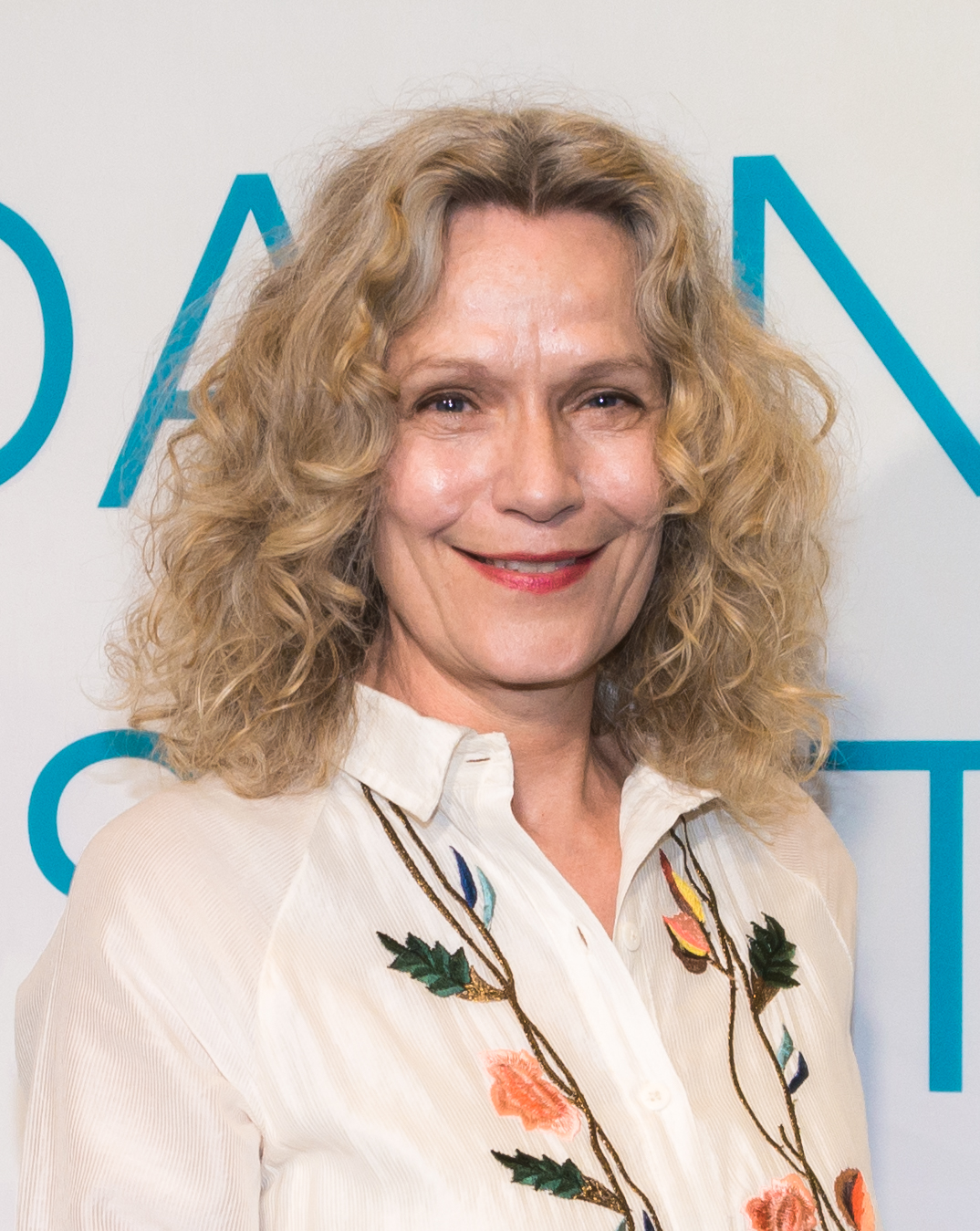
- Born: 25 July 1961 (age 65); Gothenburg, Sweden
- Occupation: Professor of philosophy
- Notable work: Alternativa fakta: Om kunskapen och dess fiender ("Alternative facts: On knowledge and its enemies"); Därför demokrati: Om kunskapen och folkstyret (That's the reason for democracy: On knowledge and rule by the people)

Member of the Swedish Academy (Seat No. 7)
- Incumbent
- Assumed office 20 December 2019
- Preceded by: Sara Danius

Åsa Wikforss (born 25 July 1961) is a professor of theoretical philosophy at Stockholm University, and a member of the Swedish Academy.

Wikforss does research in the intersection of philosophy of mind, language and epistemology and has published widely on a variety of topics in the area. She is a member of several international research networks and research councils and was elected to the Royal Swedish Academy of Sciences. In September 2017 she published Alternativa fakta: Om kunskapen och dess fiender ("Alternative facts: On knowledge and its enemies"). The book was gifted to over 100 000 gymnasium students for the Christmas of 2019, but was criticized in an article from Svenska Dagbladet for statistical errors on the topic of Swedish schools.

In 2018 she has had over a hundred public appearances, speaking about knowledge and knowledge-resistance, in Sweden and beyond. She participates frequently in the public debate in Sweden, in print as well as on TV and radio. On 9 May 2019 she was elected as a member of Swedish Academy, to succeed Sara Danius on seat 7. She was formally inducted on 20 December 2019.

In 2021 Wikforss published Därför demokrati: Om kunskapen och folkstyret (That's the reason for democracy: On knowledge and rule of the people), a followup book to Alternativa fakta that discusses the motivations for democracy along with the political system's relation to truth. In 2026 she published the book Why Learn?: The Importance of Human Knowledge in the Age of AI (coauthored with Torkel Klinberg).

Cultural offices
Preceded by Sara Danius	Swedish Academy, Seat No.7; 2019–	Succeeded by incumbent
