= Bernhard von Beskow =

Swedish dramatist and historian

Baron Bernhard von Beskow
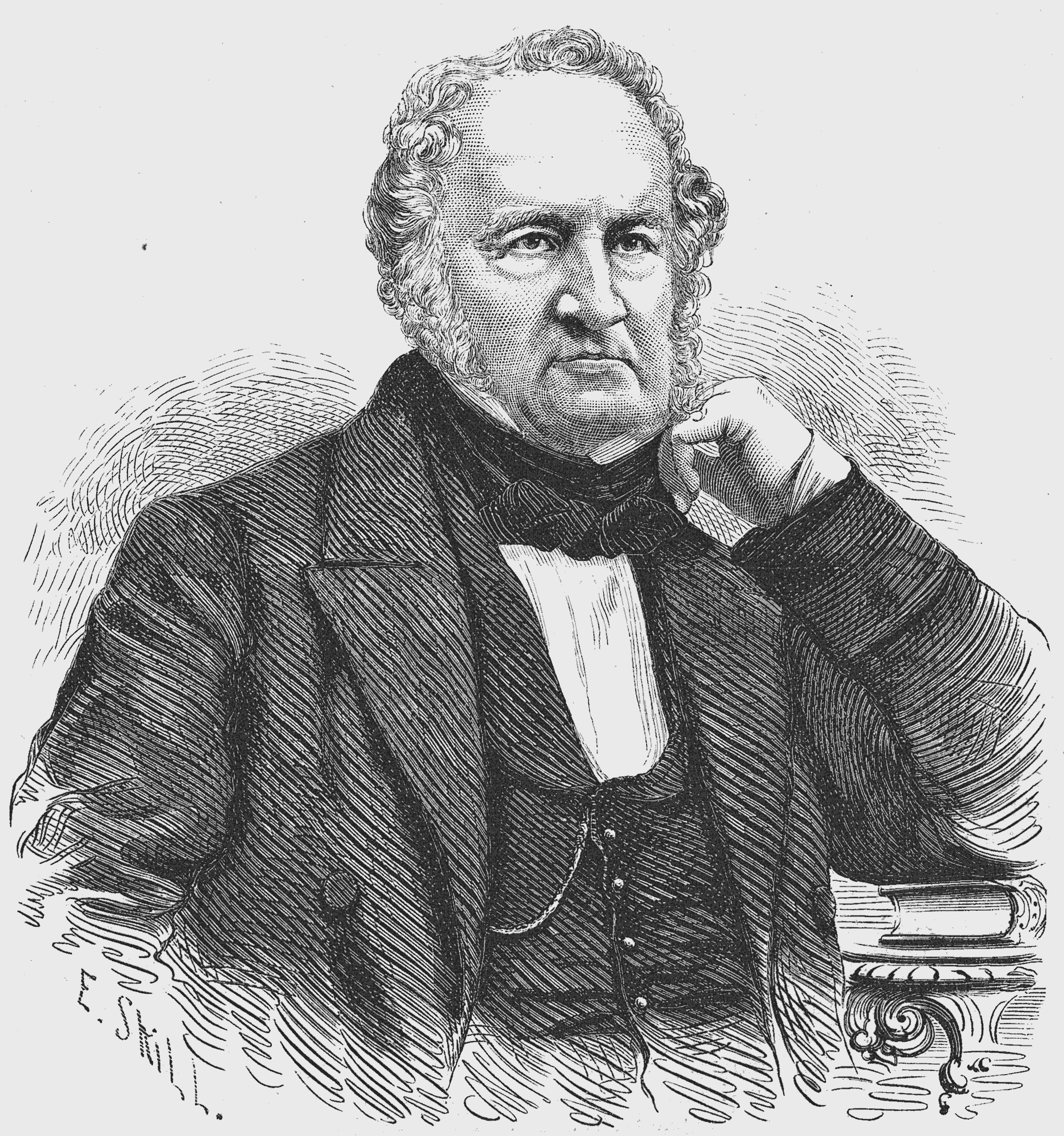
- Portrait by Edward Skill (1866)
- Born: 19 April 1796; Stockholm, Sweden
- Died: 17 October 1868 (aged 72); Stockholm, Sweden
- Occupations: Dramatist, historian

Bernhard von Beskow (19 April 1796 – 17 October 1868) was a Swedish dramatist and historian.

Born in Stockholm and the son of a merchant, his vocation for literature was assisted by his tutor, the poet Johan Magnus Stjernstolpe (1777–1831), whose works he edited. He entered the civil service in 1814, was ennobled in 1826 and received the title of baron in 1843. He held high appointments at court, and was, from 1834 onward, the perpetual secretary of the Swedish Academy— using his great influence with tact and generosity. He was an elected a member of the Royal Swedish Academy of Sciences in 1836.

He produced a series of plays based on Swedish history. His works allowed for his recognition as the most respectable exponent of romantic historical play which became popular among the Swedish audience. He has written several academical memoirs, volumes of poems, philosophy and a historical study entitled Om Gustav den tredje såsom Konung och Menniska (5 vols, 1860–1869, Gustavus III as king and man), printed in the transactions of the Swedish Academy (vols 32, 34, 37, 42, 44).

According to the Encyclopædia Britannica Eleventh Edition, "his poetry is over-decorated, and his plays are grandiose historical poems in dramatic form”. Among his famous works are Erik XIV (2 parts, 1826); and four pieces collected (1836–1838) as Dramatiska Studier, the most famous of which is the tragedy of Torkel Knutsson."

He became a member of Pro Fide et Christianismo, a Christian education society, in 1852.

He died in Stockholm in 1868.

Cultural offices
Preceded by Gustaf Fredrik Wirsén	Swedish Academy; Seat No.12; 1828–1868	Succeeded by Carl Gustaf Strandberg
