= Karl Ragnar Gierow =

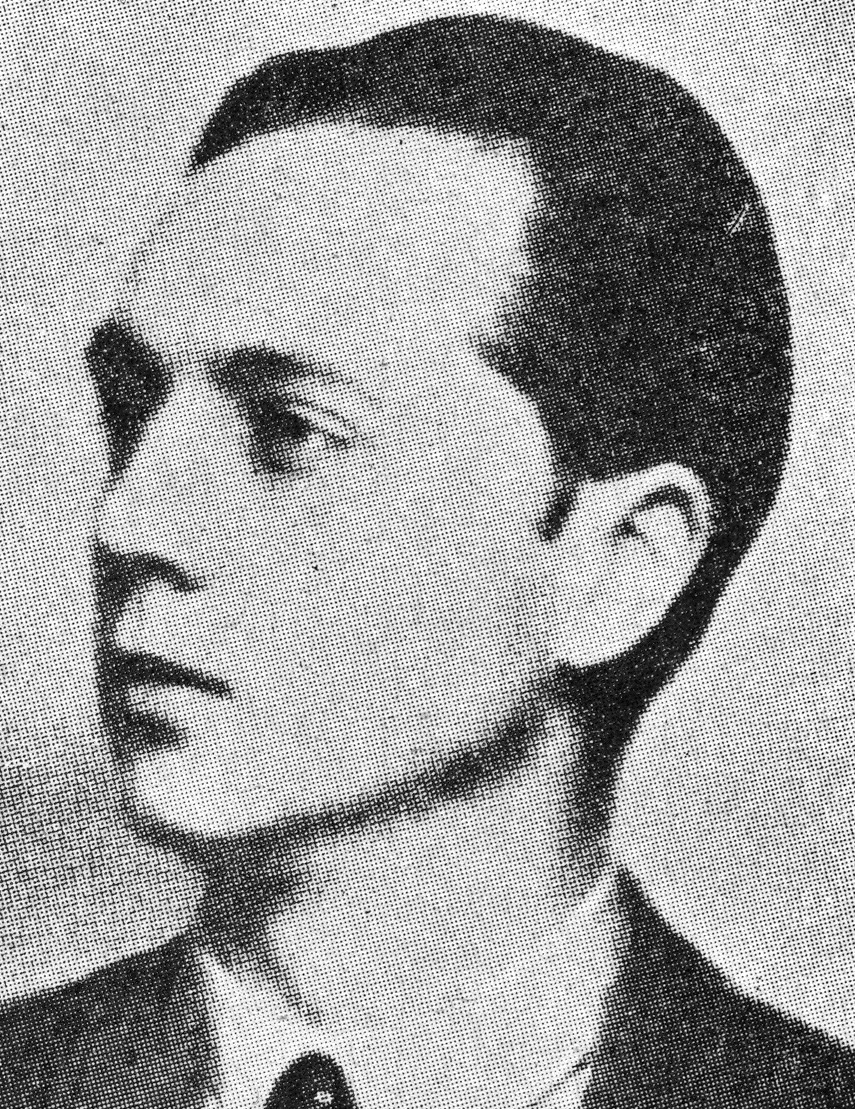
- Born: 2 February 1904; Helsingborg, Sweden
- Died: 30 October 1982 (aged 78); Stockholm, Sweden
- Education: Lund University
- Occupations: author, theatre director, and translator
- Spouse: Karin Hellmer

Member of the Swedish Academy (Seat No. 7)
- In office 20 December 1961 – 30 October 1982
- Preceded by: Hjalmar Gullberg
- Succeeded by: Knut Ahnlund

Permanent Secretary of the Swedish Academy
- In office June 1964 – May 1977
- Preceded by: Anders Österling
- Succeeded by: Lars Gyllensten

Karl Ragnar Knut Gierow (2 April 1904 – 30 October 1982) was a Swedish theater director, author and translator.

== Biography ==
Gierow was born and grew up in Helsingborg. He enrolled at Lund University in 1922, and received a licentiate degree in 1934.

Gierow was employed at Norstedts publishing 1930–1937, then was a literary employee at Sveriges Radiotjänst in 1937–1946. He was the head of the literary section of Svenska Dagbladet in 1946–51. Between 1951 and 1963 Gierow was managing director of the Royal Dramatic Theatre. During his time, many new European (and controversial) plays were performed there, including plays by Bertolt Brecht, Jean-Paul Sartre, and Eugene O'Neill. Gierow directed plays himself during all his time as managing director.

Gierow also wrote poetry, lyrics for popular songs, plays, essays and screenplays. He received several awards for his writing, including the Bellman Prize in 1977.

He was a member of the Swedish Academy from 1961 and its permanent secretary from 1964 to 1977. He was a member of the Swedish Academy's Nobel Committee in 1963–1982 and its chairman 1970–1980. His wife Karin died in 1971.

Cultural offices
Preceded by Hjalmar Gullberg	Swedish Academy, Seat No.7; 1961–82	Succeeded by Knut Ahnlund
