= List of members of the Swedish Academy =

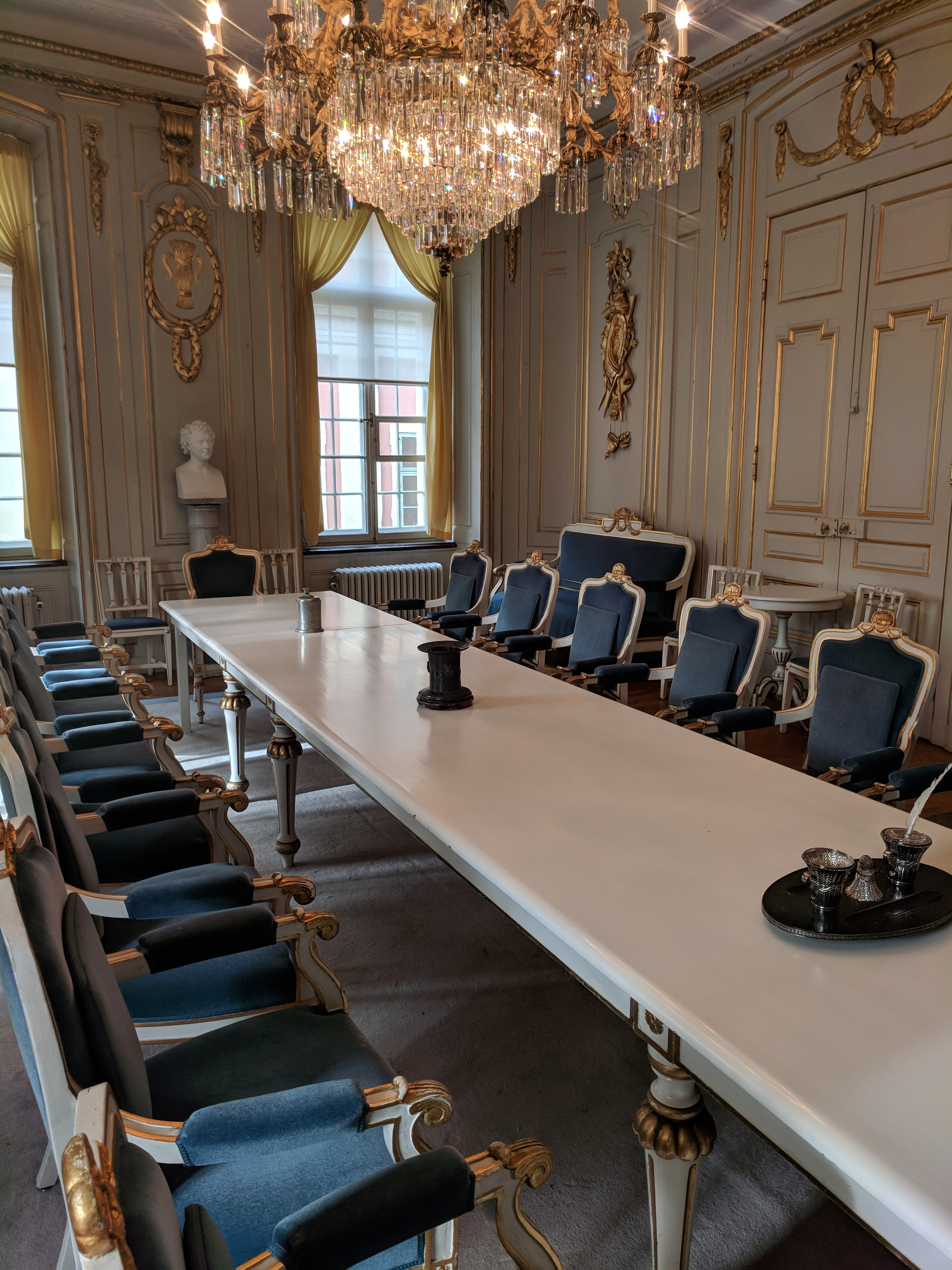
The meeting room for members.

This is a list of members of the Swedish Academy by seat number. The dates shown indicate the terms of the members, who generally serve for life except for Gustaf Mauritz Armfelt who was excluded twice.

On 2 May 2018, the Swedish King amended the rules of the academy and made it possible for members to resign. The new rules also states that a member who has been inactive in the work of the academy for more than two years, can be asked to resign. Following the new rules, the first members to formally be granted permission to leave the Academy and vacating their chairs were Kerstin Ekman, Klas Östergren, Sara Stridsberg and Lotta Lotass.

== Seat 1 ==
Picture	Name	Born	Died/Age	Elected	Entered	Withdrew
	Anders Johan von Höpken	31 March 1712; Stockholm, Sweden	9 May 1789 (aged 77); Stockholm, Sweden	20 March 1786	5 April 1786	9 May 1789
	Nils Philip Gyldenstolpe	19 February 1734; Österåker, Sweden	20 February 1810 (aged 76); Stockholm, Sweden	18 June 1789	11 December 1789	20 February 1810
	Johan Olof Wallin	15 October 1779; Borlänge, Sweden	30 June 1839 (aged 59); Uppsala, Sweden	29 March 1810	29 May 1811	30 June 1839
	Anders Fryxell	7 February 1795; Åmål, Sweden	21 March 1881 (aged 86); Stockholm, Sweden	1 June 1840	23 May 1841	21 March 1881
	Hans Forssell	14 January 1843; Gävle, Sweden	2 August 1901 (aged 58); San Bernardino, Switzerland	19 May 1881	20 December 1881	2 August 1901
	Carl Bildt	15 March 1850; Stockholm, Sweden	26 January 1931 (aged 80); Rome, Italy	28 November 1901	20 June 1902	26 January 1931
	Carl Otto Birger Wedberg	28 September 1870; Stockholm, Sweden	2 October 1945 (aged 75); Lidingö, Sweden	23 April 1931	20 December 1931	2 October 1945
	Birger Ekeberg	10 August 1880; Uppsala, Sweden	30 November 1968 (aged 88); Stockholm, Sweden	1 November 1945	20 December 1945	30 November 1968
	Bror Arvid Sture Petrén	3 October 1908; Stockholm, Sweden	13 December 1976 (aged 68); Geneva, Switzerland	6 March 1969	20 December 1969	13 December 1976
	Sten Rudholm	27 April 1918; Karlstad, Sweden	29 November 2008 (aged 90); Norrtälje, Sweden	10 February 1977	20 December 1977	29 November 2008
	Lotta Lotass	28 February 1964; Gagnef, Sweden	(aged 62)	5 March 2009	20 December 2009	7 May 2018
	Eric M. Runesson	26 September 1960; Stockholm, Sweden	(aged 65)	4 October 2018	20 December 2018	

== Seat 2 ==
Picture	Name	Born	Died/Age	Elected	Entered	Withdrew
	Carl Fredrik Scheffer	28 April 1715; Nyköping, Sweden	27 August 1786 (aged 71); Svalöv, Sweden	20 March 1786	Died before he entered	27 August 1786
	Abraham Niclas Edelcrantz	28 July 1754; Turku, Finland	5 March 1821 (aged 66); Stockholm, Sweden	19 October 1786	2 December 1786	15 March 1821
	Carl Peter Hagberg	23 November 1778; Uppsala, Sweden	15 September 1841 (aged 62); Stockholm, Sweden	1 June 1821	29 October 1821	15 September 1841
	Christian Eric Fahlcrantz	30 August 1790; Borlänge, Sweden	6 August 1866 (aged 75); Västerås, Sweden	5 December 1842	15 January 1844	6 August 1866
	Gunnar Wennerberg	2 October 1817; Lidköping, Sweden	24 August 1901 (aged 83); Västergötland, Sweden	6 December 1866	20 December 1867	24 August 1901
	Claes Annerstedt	7 June 1839; Uppsala, Sweden	20 November 1927 (aged 88); Uppsala, Sweden	28 November 1901	20 December 1902	20 November 1927
	Martin Lamm	22 June 1880; Stockholm, Sweden	5 May 1950 (aged 69); Stockholm, Sweden	1928	20 December 1928	5 May 1950
	Ingvar Andersson	19 March 1899; Hässleholm, Sweden	14 October 1974 (aged 75); Stockholm, Sweden	28 September 1950	20 December 1950	14 October 1974
	Torgny T:son Segerstedt	11 August 1908; Mellerud, Sweden	28 January 1999 (aged 90); Uppsala, Sweden	15 May 1975	20 December 1975	28 January 1999
	Bo Ralph	4 October 1945; Gothenburg, Sweden	(aged 80)	5 April 1999	20 December 1999	

== Seat 3 ==
Picture	Name	Born	Died/Age	Elected	Entered	Withdrew
	Olof Celsius den yngre	15 December 1716; Uppsala, Sweden	15 February 1794 (aged 77); Lund, Sweden	20 March 1786	27 May 1786	15 February 1794
	Johan Adam Tingstadius	8 July 1748; Nyköping, Sweden	10 December 1827 (aged 79); Strängnäs, Sweden	12 June 1794	12 February 1795	10 December 1827
	Carl Gustaf von Brinkman	25 February 1764; Nacka, Sweden	25 December 1847 (aged 83); Stockholm, Sweden	11 February 1828	3 November 1828	25 December 1847
	Albrecht Elof Ihre	6 October 1797; Stockholm, Sweden	9 August 1877 (aged 79); Ekerö, Sweden	6 April 1848	Never took seat	5 August 1859
	Johan Börjesson	30 August 1790; Tanum, Sweden	6 May 1866 (aged 75); Uppsala, Sweden	1 December 1859	19 March 1861	6 May 1866
	Hans Magnus Melin	14 September 1805; Simrishamn, Sweden	17 November 1877 (aged 72); Lund, Sweden	14 June 1866	20 December 1866	17 November 1877
	Carl Gustaf Malmström	2 November 1822; Örebro, Sweden	12 September 1912 (aged 89); Djursholm, Sweden	21 March 1878	20 December 1878	12 September 1912
	Henrik Schück	2 November 1855; Stockholm, Sweden	3 October 1947 (aged 91); Uppsala, Sweden	16 January 1913	20 December 1913	3 October 1947
	Henrik Samuel Nyberg	28 December 1889; Söderbärke, Sweden	9 February 1974 (aged 84); Uppsala, Sweden	26 February 1948	20 December 1948	9 February 1974
	Carl Ivar Ståhle	27 June 1913; Vetlanda, Sweden	12 June 1980 (aged 66); Lidingö, Sweden	18 April 1974	20 December 1974	12 June 1980
	Sture Allén	31 December 1928; Gothenburg, Sweden	20 June 2022 (aged 93); Stockholm, Sweden	2 October 1980	20 December 1980	20 June 2022
	David Håkansson	26 November 1978; Lund, Sweden	(aged 47)	11 May 2023	20 December 2023	

== Seat 4 ==
Picture	Name	Born	Died/Age	Elected	Entered	Withdrew
	Johan Henric Kellgren	1 December 1751; Falköping, Sweden	20 April 1795 (aged 43); Stockholm, Sweden	20 March 1786	5 April 1786	20 April 1795
	Johan Stenhammar	17 June 1769; Västervik, Sweden	31 January 1799 (aged 29); Uppsala, Sweden	4 February 1797	14 March 1798	31 January 1799
	Claes Adolph Fleming	25 April 1771; Uppsala, Sweden	12 May 1831 (aged 60); Stockholm, Sweden	25 April 1799	23 November 1799	12 May 1831
	Carl Adolph Agardh	23 January 1785; Båstad, Sweden	12 January 1859 (aged 73); Karlstad, Sweden	18 July 1831	22 August 1834	28 January 1859
	Fredrik Ferdinand Carlson	13 June 1811; Knivsta, Sweden	18 March 1887 (aged 75); Stockholm, Sweden	1 December 1859	19 March 1861	18 March 1887
	Claes Herman Rundgren	12 August 1819; Stockholm, Sweden	19 September 1906 (aged 87); Karlstad, Sweden	26 May 1887	20 December 1887	19 September 1906
	Ivar Afzelius	15 October 1848; Uppsala, Sweden	30 October 1921 (aged 73); Stockholm, Sweden	14 February 1907	15 February 1908	20 October 1921
	Tor Hedberg	23 March 1862; Stockholm, Sweden	31 July 1931 (aged 69); Stockholm, Sweden	30 March 1922	20 December 1922	13 July 1931
	Sigfrid Siwertz	24 January 1882; Stockholm, Sweden	26 November 1970 (aged 88); Stockholm, Sweden	7 April 1932	20 December 1932	26 November 1970
	Lars Forssell	14 January 1928; Stockholm, Sweden	26 July 2007 (aged 80); Stockholm, Sweden	11 March 1971	20 December 1971	26 July 2007
	Anders Olsson	19 June 1949; Stockholm, Sweden	(aged 76)	21 February 2008	20 December 2008	

== Seat 5 ==
Picture	Name	Born	Died/Age	Elected	Entered	Withdrew
	Matthias von Hermansson	13 May 1716; Lund, Sweden	25 July 1789 (aged 73); Stockholm, Sweden	20 March 1786	5 April 1786	25 July 1789
	Magnus Lehnberg	22 May 1758; Vimmerby, Sweden	9 December 1808 (aged 50); Linköping, Sweden	27 August 1789	17 March 1790	9 December 1808
	Jacob Axelsson Lindblom	27 July 1746; Linköping, Sweden	15 February 1819 (aged 72); Uppsala, Sweden	9 February 1809	8 July 1809	15 February 1819
	Carl von Rosenstein	13 May 1766; Uppsala, Sweden	2 December 1836 (aged 70); Uppsala, Sweden	1 April 1819	10 April 1820	2 December 1836
	Jöns Jacob Berzelius	20 August 1779; Vadstena, Sweden	7 August 1848 (aged 68); Stockholm, Sweden	18 September 1837	20 December 1837	7 August 1848
	Johan Erik Rydqvist	20 October 1800; Gothenburg, Sweden	17 December 1877 (aged 77); Stockholm, Sweden	6 August 1849	20 December 1849	17 December 1877
	Theodor Wisén	31 March 1835; Emmaboda, Sweden	15 February 1892 (aged 56); Lund, Sweden	29 May 1878	20 December 1878	15 February 1892
	Knut Fredrik Söderwall	1 January 1842; Hylte, Sweden	30 May 1924 (aged 82); Lund, Sweden	19 May 1892	20 December 1892	30 May 1924
	Axel Kock	2 March 1851; Trelleborg, Sweden	18 March 1935 (aged 84); Lund, Sweden	13 November 1924	20 December 1924	18 March 1935
	Bengt Hesselman	21 December 1875; Stockholm, Sweden	6 April 1952 (aged 76); Uppsala, Sweden	23 May 1935	20 December 1935	6 April 1952
	Henry Olsson	18 April 1896; Eda, Sweden	11 January 1985 (aged 88); Stockholm, Sweden	28 May 1952	20 December 1952	11 January 1985
	Göran Malmqvist	6 June 1924; Jönköping, Sweden	17 October 2019 (aged 95); Danderyd, Sweden	11 April 1985	20 December 1985	17 October 2019
	Ingrid Carlberg	30 November 1961; Surahammar, Sweden	(aged 64)	13 October 2020	15 April 2021	

== Seat 6 ==
Picture	Name	Born	Died/Age	Elected	Entered	Withdrew
	Johan Wingård	19 April 1738; Bohuslän, Sweden	12 January 1818 (aged 79); Gothenburg, Sweden	20 March 1786	27 May 1786	12 January 1818
	Adolf Göran Mörner	27 July 1773; Örebro, Sweden	30 January 1838 (aged 64); Stockholm, Sweden	2 April 1818	2 March 1819	30 January 1838
	Anders Abraham Grafström	10 January 1790; Sundsvall, Sweden	24 July 1870 (aged 80); Umeå, Sweden	10 June 1839	26 May 1840	24 July 1870
	Fredrik August Dahlgren	20 September 1816; Filipstad, Sweden	16 February 1895 (aged 78); Djursholm, Sweden	2 March 1816	20 December 1871	16 February 1895
	Hans Hildebrand	5 April 1842; Stockholm, Sweden	2 February 1913 (aged 70); Stockholm, Sweden	16 May 1895	20 December 1895	2 February 1913
	Sven Hedin	19 February 1865; Stockholm, Sweden	26 November 1952 (aged 87); Stockholm, Sweden	22 May 1913	20 December 1913	26 November 1952
	Sten Selander	1 July 1891; Stockholm, Sweden	8 April 1957 (aged 65); Stockholm, Sweden	23 April 1953	20 December 1953	8 April 1957
	Olle Hedberg	31 May 1899; Norrköping, Sweden	20 September 1974 (aged 75); Kinda, Sweden	19 September 1957	20 December 1957	20 September 1974
	Per Olof Sundman	4 September 1922; Vaxholm, Sweden	9 October 1992 (aged 70); Stockholm, Sweden	15 May 1975	20 December 1975	9 October 1992
	Birgitta Trotzig	11 September 1929; Gothenburg, Sweden	14 May 2011 (aged 81); Lund, Sweden	11 February 1993	20 December 1993	14 May 2011
	Tomas Riad	15 November 1959; Uppsala, Sweden	(aged 66)	29 September 2011	20 December 2011	

== Seat 7 ==
Picture	Name	Born	Died/Age	Elected	Entered	Withdrew
	Axel von Fersen the Elder	5 April 1719; Stockholm, Sweden	24 April 1794 (aged 75); Stockholm, Sweden	20 March 1786	5 April 1786	24 April 1794
	Axel Gabriel Silfverstolpe	10 August 1762; Stockholm, Sweden	5 September 1816 (aged 54); Stockholm, Sweden	12 June 1794	4 March 1795	5 September 1816
	Anders Carlsson af Kullberg	3 August 1771; Lidköping, Sweden	5 May 1851 (aged 79); Kalmar, Sweden	27 February 1817	15 November 1817	5 May 1851
	Carl August Hagberg	7 July 1810; Lund, Sweden	9 January 1864 (aged 53); Lund, Sweden	24 November 1851	18 May 1852	9 January 1864
	Wilhelm Erik Svedelius	5 May 1816; Köping, Sweden	26 February 1889 (aged 72); Uppsala, Sweden	13 October 1864	20 December 1864	26 February 1889
	Nils Fredrik Sander	26 September 1828; Örebro, Sweden	30 May 1900 (aged 71); Stockholm, Sweden	9 May 1889	20 December 1889	30 May 1900
	Albert Theodor Gellerstedt	6 October 1836; Arboga, Sweden	7 April 1914 (aged 77); Stockholm, Sweden	14 February 1901	20 December 1901	7 April 1914
	Selma Lagerlöf	20 November 1858; Sunne, Sweden	16 March 1940 (aged 81); Sunne, Sweden	28 May 1914	20 December 1914	16 March 1940
	Hjalmar Gullberg	30 May 1898; Malmö, Sweden	19 July 1961 (aged 63); Svedala, Sweden	16 May 1940	20 December 1940	19 July 1961
	Karl Ragnar Gierow	2 April 1904; Helsingborg, Sweden	30 October 1982 (aged 78); Stockholm, Sweden	28 September 1961	20 December 1961	30 October 1982
	Knut Ahnlund	24 May 1923; Stockholm, Sweden	28 November 2012 (aged 89); Täby, Sweden	10 March 1983	20 December 1983	28 November 2012
	Sara Danius	5 April 1962; Täby, Sweden	12 October 2019 (aged 57); Stockholm, Sweden	7 March 2013	20 December 2013	26 February 2019
	Åsa Wikforss	25 July 1961; Gothenburg, Sweden	(aged 64)	9 May 2019	20 December 2019	

== Seat 8 ==
Picture	Name	Born	Died/Age	Elected	Entered	Withdrew
	Johan Gabriel Oxenstierna	19 July 1750; Eskilstuna, Sweden	29 July 1818 (aged 68); Stockholm, Sweden	20 March 1786	5 April 1786	29 July 1818
	Esaias Tegnér	13 November 1782; Säffle, Sweden	2 November 1846 (aged 63); Växjö, Sweden	5 November 1818	22 June 1819	2 November 1846
	Carl Wilhelm Böttiger	15 May 1807; Västerås, Sweden	22 December 1878 (aged 71); Uppsala, Sweden	12 July 1847	18 December 1847	22 December 1878
	Carl David af Wirsén	9 December 1842; Vallentuna, Sweden	12 June 1912 (aged 69); Stockholm, Sweden	20 March 1879	20 December 1879	12 June 1912
	Verner von Heidenstam	6 July 1859; Olshammar, Sweden	20 May 1940 (aged 80); Motala, Sweden	19 September 1912	20 December 1912	20 May 1940
	Pär Lagerkvist	23 May 1891; Växjö, Sweden	11 July 1974 (aged 83); Lidingö, Sweden	19 September 1940	20 December 1940	11 July 1974
	Östen Sjöstrand	16 June 1925; Gothenburg, Sweden	13 May 2006 (aged 79); Solna, Sweden	15 May 1975	20 December 1975	13 May 2006
	Jesper Svenbro	10 March 1944; Landskrona, Sweden	(aged 82)	5 October 2006	20 December 2006	

== Seat 9 ==
Picture	Name	Born	Died/Age	Elected	Entered	Withdrew
	Gudmund Jöran Adlerbeth	21 May 1751; Jönköping, Sweden	7 October 1818 (aged 67); Jönköping, Sweden	20 March 1786	5 April 1786	7 October 1818
	Hans Järta	11 February 1774; Hedemora, Sweden	6 April 1847 (aged 73); Uppsala, Sweden	1 April 1819	29 November 1826	6 April 1847
	Carl David Skogman	26 October 1786; Loviisa, Finland	20 February 1856 (aged 69); Stockholm, Sweden	16 August 1847	20 December 1848	20 February 1856
	Henning Hamilton	16 January 1814; Stockholm, Sweden	15 January 1886 (aged 71); Amélie-les-Bains-Palalda, France	2 May 1856	24 January 1859	2 November 1881
	Esaias Tegnér Jr.	13 January 1843; Malmö, Sweden	21 November 1928 (aged 85); Lund, Sweden	9 March 1882	20 December 1882	21 November 1928
	Otto von Friesen	11 May 1870; Gnosjö. Sweden	11 September 1942 (aged 72); Uppsala, Sweden	16 May 1929	20 December 1929	10 September 1942
	Einar Löfstedt	15 June 1880; Uppsala, Sweden	10 June 1955 (aged 74); Stockholm, Sweden	15 October 1942	20 December 1942	10 June 1955
	Ture Gustaf Johannisson	26 September 1903; Sundsvall, Sweden	16 December 1990 (aged 87); Gothenburg, Sweden	29 September 1955	20 December 1955	16 December 1990
	Torgny Lindgren	16 June 1938; Norsjö, Sweden	16 March 2017 (aged 78); Kinda, Sweden	28 February 1991	20 December 1991	16 March 2017
	Jayne Svenungsson	9 December 1973; Trollhättan, Sweden	(aged 52)	28 September 2017	20 December 2017	7 November 2018
	Ellen Mattson	22 September 1962; Uddevalla, Sweden	(aged 63)	28 March 2019	20 December 2019	

== Seat 10 ==
Picture	Name	Born	Died/Age	Elected	Entered	Withdrew
	Anders af Botin	15 March 1724; Kalmar, Sweden	22 September 1790 (aged 66); Stockholm, Sweden	20 March 1786	5 April 1786	22 September 1790
	Christoffer Bogislaus Zibet	25 December 1740; Åstorp, Sweden	16 May 1809 (aged 68); Stockholm, Sweden	13 November 1790	10 December 1790	16 May 1809
	Gustaf Lagerbielke	22 March 1777; Stockholm, Sweden	24 May 1837 (aged 60); Stockholm, Sweden	17 June 1809	25 September 1819	24 May 1837
	Carl Fredrik af Wingård	26 September 1781; Stockholm, Sweden	19 September 1851 (aged 69); Uppsala, Sweden	18 September 1837	31 May 1838	9 September 1851
	Henrik Reuterdahl	11 September 1795; Malmö, Sweden	28 June 1870 (aged 74); Uppsala, Sweden	14 June 1852	20 December 1852	28 June 1870
	Paulus Genberg	13 April 1811; Östersund, Sweden	29 September 1875 (aged 64); Kalmar, Sweden	2 March 1871	5 June 1872	29 September 1875
	Carl Snoilsky	8 September 1841; Stockholm, Sweden	19 May 1903 (aged 61); Stockholm, Sweden	20 April 1876	20 December 1876	19 May 1903
	Harald Hjärne	2 May 1848; Skövde, Sweden	9 January 1922 (aged 73); Uppsala, Sweden	15 August 1903	20 December 1903	6 January 1922
	Fredrik Böök	12 May 1883; Kristianstad, Sweden	2 December 1961 (aged 78); Copenhagen, Denmark	30 March 1922	20 December 1922	2 December 1961
	Erik Lönnroth	1 August 1910; Gothenburg, Sweden	10 March 2002 (aged 91); Gothenburg, Sweden	17 May 1962	20 December 1962	10 March 2002
	Peter Englund	4 April 1957; Boden, Sweden	(aged 69)	23 May 2002	20 December 2002	

== Seat 11 ==
Picture	Name	Born	Died/Age	Elected	Entered	Withdrew
	Nils von Rosenstein	1 December 1752; Uppsala, Sweden	7 August 1824 (aged 71); Stockholm, Sweden	20 March 1786	5 April 1786	7 August 1824
	Lars Magnus Enberg	3 November 1787; Säffle, Sweden	20 November 1865 (aged 78); Stockholm, Sweden	11 October 1824	21 February 1825	20 November 1865
	Bror Emil Hildebrand	22 February 1806; Nybro, Sweden	30 August 1884 (aged 78); Stockholm, Sweden	14 June 1866	20 December 1866	30 August 1884
	Clas Theodor Odhner	17 June 1836; Alingsås, Sweden	11 June 1904 (aged 67); Stockholm, Sweden	26 February 1885	20 December 1885	11 June 1904
	Erik Axel Karlfeldt	20 July 1864; Avesta, Sweden	8 April 1931 (aged 66); Stockholm, Sweden	14 July 1904	20 December 1904	8 April 1931
	Torsten Fogelqvist	25 January 1880; Lidköping, Sweden	24 January 1941 (aged 59); Smedjebacken, Sweden	1 October 1931	20 December 1931	23 January 1941
	Nils Ahnlund	23 August 1889; Uppsala, Sweden	11 January 1957 (aged 67); Stockholm, Sweden	3 April 1941	20 December 1941	11 January 1957
	Eyvind Johnson	29 July 1900; Boden, Sweden	25 August 1976 (aged 76); Stockholm, Sweden	11 April 1957	20 December 1957	25 August 1976
	Ulf Linde	15 April 1929; Stockholm, Sweden	12 October 2013 (aged 84); Danderyd, Sweden	10 February 1977	20 December 1977	12 October 2013
	Klas Östergren	20 February 1955; Stockholm, Sweden	(aged 71)	27 February 2014	20 December 2014	7 May 2018
	Mats Malm	10 May 1964; Gothenburg, Sweden	(aged 62)	18 October 2018	20 December 2018	

== Seat 12 ==
Picture	Name	Born	Died/Age	Elected	Entered	Withdrew
	Elis Schröderheim	26 March 1747; Stockholm, Sweden	30 August 1795 (aged 48); Stockholm, Sweden	20 March 1786	5 April 1786	30 August 1795
	Isac Reinhold Blom	27 October 1762; Nyköping, Sweden	6 May 1826 (aged 64); Uppsala, Sweden	11 March 1797	25 November 1797	6 May 1826
	Gustaf Fredrik Wirsén	21 October 1779; Helsinki, Finland	9 December 1827 (aged 48); Stockholm, Sweden	12 June 1826	26 March 1827	9 December 1827
	Bernhard von Beskow	19 April 1796; Stockholm, Sweden	17 October 1868 (aged 72); Stockholm, Sweden	11 February 1828	1 November 1828	17 October 1868
	Carl Gustaf Strandberg	5 May 1825; Nyköping, Sweden	8 February 1874 (aged 48); Stockholm, Sweden	3 June 1869	20 December 1869	8 February 1874
	Anders Anderson	6 July 1822; Jönköping, Sweden	10 September 1892 (aged 70); Växjö, Sweden	18 March 1875	20 December 1875	10 September 1892
	Adolf Erik Nordenskiöld	18 November 1832; Helsinki, Finland	12 August 1901 (aged 68); Trosa, Sweden	27 April 1893	20 December 1893	12 August 1901
	Gustaf Retzius	17 October 1842; Stockholm, Sweden	21 July 1919 (aged 76); Stockholm, Sweden	28 November 1901	20 December 1901	21 July 1919
	Adolf Noreen	13 March 1854; Sunne, Sweden	13 June 1925 (aged 71); Uppsala, Sweden	2 October 1919	20 December 1919	13 June 1925
	Bo Bergman	6 October 1869; Stockholm, Sweden	17 November 1967 (aged 98); Stockholm, Sweden	24 September 1925	20 December 1925	17 November 1967
	Sten Lindroth	28 December 1914; Lund, Sweden	1 September 1980 (aged 65); Uppsala, Sweden	9 March 1968	20 December 1968	1 September 1980
	Werner Aspenström	13 November 1918; Avesta, Sweden	25 January 1997 (aged 78); Stockholm, Sweden	19 March 1981	20 December 1981	25 January 1997
	Per Wästberg	20 November 1933; Stockholm, Sweden	(aged 92)	17 April 1997	20 December 1997	

== Seat 13 ==
Picture	Name	Born	Died/Age	Elected	Entered	Withdrew
	Gustaf Fredrik Gyllenborg	25 November 1731; Linköping, Sweden	30 March 1808 (aged 76); Stockholm, Sweden	20 March 1786	5 April 1786	30 March 1808
	Frans Michael Franzén	9 February 1772; Oulu, Finland	14 August 1847 (aged 75); Härnösand, Sweden	5 May 1808	27 November 1811	14 August 1847
	Bernhard Elis Malmström	12 March 1816; Örebro, Sweden	21 June 1865 (aged 49); Uppsala, Sweden	26 November 1849	18 December 1850	21 June 1865
	Carl Anders Kullberg	26 October 1815; Skövde, Sweden	22 October 1897 (aged 81); Skövde, Sweden	19 October 1865	29 May 1866	22 October 1897
	Karl Alfred Melin	11 March 1849; Utö, Sweden	5 July 1919 (aged 70); Nynäshamn, Sweden	17 February 1898	20 December 1898	5 July 1919
	Anders Österling	13 April 1884; Helsingborg, Sweden	13 December 1981 (aged 97); Stockholm, Sweden	2 October 1919	20 December 1919	13 December 1981
	Gunnel Vallquist	19 June 1918; Stockholm, Sweden	11 January 2016 (aged 97); Stockholm, Sweden	1 April 1982	20 December 1982	11 January 2016
	Sara Stridsberg	29 August 1972; Solna, Sweden	(aged 53)	12 May 2016	20 December 2016	7 May 2018
	Anne Swärd	16 February 1969; Perstorp, Sweden	(aged 57)	28 March 2019	20 December 2019	

== Seat 14 ==
Picture	Name	Born	Died/Age	Elected	Entered	Withdrew
	Gustaf Mauritz Armfelt	31 March 1757; Tarvasjoki, Finland	19 August 1814 (aged 57); Saint Petersburg, Russia	12 April 1786	13 May 1786	25 September 1794
	Malte Ramel	27 May 1747; Kristianstad, Sweden	31 January 1824 (aged 76); Sjöbo, Sweden	7 January 1797	30 April 1802	31 January 1824
	Erik Gustaf Geijer	12 January 1783; Ransäter, Sweden	23 April 1847 (aged 64); Stockholm, Sweden	1 April 1824	14 January 1826	23 April 1847
	Elias Magnus Fries	15 August 1794; Jönköping, Sweden	8 February 1878 (aged 83); Uppsala, Sweden	12 July 1847	2 December 1847	8 February 1878
	Carl Rupert Nyblom	27 March 1832; Uppsala, Sweden	30 May 1907 (aged 75); Stockholm, Sweden	20 March 1879	20 December 1879	30 May 1907
	Per Hallström	29 September 1866; Stockholm, Sweden	18 February 1960 (aged 93); Nacka, Sweden	12 March 1908	20 December 1908	18 February 1960
	Ragnar Josephson	8 March 1891; Stockholm, Sweden	27 March 1966 (aged 75); Lund, Sweden	12 May 1960	20 December 1960	27 March 1966
	Lars Gyllensten	12 November 1921; Stockholm, Sweden	25 May 2006 (aged 84); Stockholm, Sweden	26 May 1966	20 December 1966	26 May 2006
	Kristina Lugn	14 November 1948; Tierp, Sweden	9 May 2020 (aged 71); Stockholm, Sweden	5 October 2006	20 December 2006	9 May 2020
	Steve Sem-Sandberg	16 August 1958; Oslo, Norway	(aged 67)	13 October 2020	15 April 2021	

== Seat 15 ==
Picture	Name	Born	Died/Age	Elected	Entered	Withdrew
	Carl Gustaf Nordin	2 January 1749; Stockholm, Sweden	14 March 1812 (aged 63); Härnösand, Sweden	22 April 1786	13 May 1786	14 March 1812
	Carl Birger Rutström	22 November 1758; Stockholm, Sweden	13 April 1826 (aged 67); Stockholm, Sweden	2 May 1812	2 December 1813	13 April 1826
	Johan David Valerius	13 January 1776; Gothenburg, Sweden	4 August 1852 (aged 76); Stockholm, Sweden	1 June 1826	29 November 1826	4 August 1852
	Ludvig Manderström	22 January 1806; Stockholm, Sweden	18 August 1873 (aged 67); Cologne, Germany	22 November 1852	20 December 1853	18 August 1873
	Anton Niklas Sundberg	27 May 1818; Uddevalla, Sweden	2 February 1900 (aged 81); Uppsala, Sweden	5 February 1874	20 December 1874	2 February 1900
	Gottfrid Billing	29 April 1841; Önnestad, Sweden	14 January 1925 (aged 83); Lund, Sweden	31 May 1900	20 December 1900	14 January 1925
	Hans Larsson	18 February 1862; Trelleborg, Sweden	16 February 1944 (aged 81); Lund, Sweden	16 April 1925	20 December 1925	16 February 1944
	Elin Wägner	16 May 1882; Lund, Sweden	7 January 1949 (aged 66); Växjö, Sweden	25 May 1944	20 December 1944	7 January 1949
	Harry Martinson	6 May 1904; Jämshög, Sweden	11 February 1978 (aged 73); Solna, Sweden	17 March 1949	20 December 1949	11 February 1978
	Kerstin Ekman	27 August 1933; Finspång, Sweden	(aged 92)	20 April 1978	20 December 1978	7 May 2018
	Jila Mossaed	4 April 1948; Tehran, Iran	(aged 78)	4 October 2018	20 December 2018	

== Seat 16 ==
Picture	Name	Born	Died/Age	Elected	Entered	Withdrew
	Carl Gustaf af Leopold	3 April 1756; Stockholm, Sweden	9 November 1829 (aged 73); Stockholm, Sweden	1 June 1786	21 June 1786	9 November 1829
	Samuel Grubbe	19 February 1786; Borås, Sweden	6 November 1853 (aged 67); Uppsala, Sweden	25 January 1830	20 November 1830	6 November 1853
	Israel Hwasser	17 September 1790; Älvkarleby, Sweden	11 May 1860 (aged 69); Uppsala, Sweden	3 July 1854	20 December 1854	11 May 1860
	Carl Vilhelm August Strandberg	16 January 1818; Nyköping, Sweden	5 February 1877 (aged 59); Stockholm, Sweden	27 March 1862	20 December 1862	5 February 1877
	Viktor Rydberg	18 December 1828; Jönköping, Sweden	21 September 1895 (aged 66); Djursholm, Sweden	26 April 1877	22 May 1878	21 September 1895
	Erik Georg Waldemar Rudin	20 July 1833; Söderköping, Sweden	2 January 1921 (aged 87); Uppsala, Sweden	26 March 1896	20 December 1896	2 January 1921
	Nathan Söderblom	15 January 1866; Uppsala, Sweden	12 July 1931 (aged 65); Uppsala, Sweden	17 March 1921	20 December 1921	12 July 1931
	Tor Andræ	9 July 1885; Hultsfred, Sweden	24 February 1947 (aged 61); Linköping, Sweden	7 April 1932	20 December 1932	24 February 1947
	Elias Wessén	15 April 1889; Tranås, Sweden	30 January 1981 (aged 91); Stockholm, Sweden	22 May 1947	20 December 1947	30 January 1981
	Kjell Espmark	19 February 1930; Strömsund, Sweden	18 September 2022 (aged 92)	5 March 1981	20 December 1981	18 September 2022
	Anna-Karin Palm	17 March 1961; Stockholm, Sweden	(aged 65)	11 May 2023	20 December 2023	

== Seat 17 ==
Picture	Name	Born	Died/Age	Elected	Entered	Withdrew
	Johan Murberg	4 December 1734; Gävle, Sweden	27 March 1805 (aged 70); Stockholm, Sweden	14 April 1787	13 May 1787	27 March 1805
	Gustaf Mauritz Armfelt	31 March 1757; Tarvasjoki, Finland	19 August 1814 (aged 57); Saint Petersburg, Russia	4 April 1805	23 November 1807	19 August 1814
	Gustaf af Wetterstedt	29 December 1776; Vaasa, Finland	15 May 1837 (aged 60); Stockholm, Sweden	16 November 1811	16 December 1811	15 May 1837
	Anders Magnus Strinnholm	25 October 1786; Umeå, Sweden	18 January 1862 (aged 75); Stockholm, Sweden	18 September 1837	20 December 1838	18 January 1862
	Louis Gerhard De Geer	18 July 1818; Finspång, Sweden	24 September 1896 (aged 78); Hanaskog, Sweden	27 March 1862	20 December 1862	24 September 1896
	Per Jacob von Ehrenheim	4 August 1823; Enköping, Sweden	20 March 1918 (aged 94); Stockholm, Sweden	18 March 1897	20 December 1897	20 March 1918
	Hjalmar Hammarskjöld	4 February 1862; Vimmerby, Sweden	12 October 1953 (aged 91); Stockholm, Sweden	23 May 1918	20 December 1918	12 October 1953
	Dag Hammarskjöld	29 July 1905; Jönköping, Sweden	18 September 1961 (aged 56); Ndola, Zambia	18 March 1954	20 December 1954	17 September 1961
	Erik Lindegren	5 August 1910; Luleå, Sweden	31 May 1968 (aged 57); Stockholm, Sweden	12 April 1962	20 December 1962	31 May 1968
	Johannes Edfelt	21 December 1904; Tibro, Sweden	27 August 1997 (aged 92); Helsingborg, Sweden	6 March 1969	20 December 1969	27 August 1997
	Horace Engdahl	30 December 1948; Karlskrona, Sweden	(aged 77)	16 October 1997	20 December 1997	

== Seat 18 ==
Picture	Name	Born	Died/Age	Elected	Entered	Withdrew
	Nils Lorens Sjöberg	4 December 1754; Jönköping, Sweden	13 March 1822 (aged 67); Stockholm, Sweden	14 April 1787	13 May 1787	13 March 1822
	Anders Fredrik Skjöldebrand	14 July 1757; Algiers, Algeria	23 August 1834 (aged 77); Stockholm, Sweden	6 June 1822	21 October 1822	23 August 1834
	Pehr Henrik Ling	15 November 1776; Ljungby, Sweden	3 May 1839 (aged 62); Stockholm, Sweden	12 January 1835	27 June 1835	3 May 1839
	Per Daniel Amadeus Atterbom	19 January 1790; Boxholm, Sweden	21 July 1855 (aged 65); Uppsala, Sweden	10 June 1839	29 May 1840	21 July 1855
	Johan Henrik Thomander	16 June 1798; Fjälkinge, Sweden	9 July 1865 (aged 67); Lund, Sweden	22 November 1855	29 May 1857	9 July 1865
	Gustaf Ljunggren	6 March 1823; Lund, Sweden	13 August 1905 (aged 82); Lund, Sweden	19 October 1865	29 May 1866	31 August 1905
	Vitalis Norström	29 January 1856; Åmål, Sweden	29 November 1916 (aged 60); Alingsås, Sweden	14 February 1907	20 June 1907	29 November 1916
	Oscar Montelius	9 September 1843; Stockholm, Sweden	4 November 1921 (aged 78); Stockholm, Sweden	12 April 1917	20 December 1917	4 November 1921
	Albert Engström	12 May 1869; Hultsfred, Sweden	16 November 1940 (aged 71); Stockholm, Sweden	30 March 1922	20 December 1922	16 November 1940
	Gunnar Mascoll Silfverstolpe	21 January 1893; Västerås, Sweden	26 June 1942 (aged 49); Stockholm, Sweden	3 April 1941	20 December 1941	26 June 1942
	Gustaf Hellström	28 August 1882; Kristianstad, Sweden	27 February 1953 (aged 70); Stockholm, Sweden	15 October 1942	20 December 1942	27 February 1953
	Bertil Malmberg	13 August 1889; Härnösand, Sweden	11 February 1958 (aged 68); Lidingö, Sweden	23 April 1953	20 December 1953	11 February 1958
	Gunnar Ekelöf	15 September 1907; Stockholm, Sweden	16 March 1968 (aged 60); Sigtuna, Sweden	17 April 1958	20 December 1958	16 March 1968
	Artur Lundkvist	3 March 1906; Perstorp, Sweden	11 December 1991 (aged 85); Solna, Sweden	2 May 1968	20 December 1968	11 December 1991
	Katarina Frostenson	5 March 1953; Stockholm, Sweden	(aged 73)	27 February 1992	20 December 1992	18 January 2019
	Tua Forsström	2 April 1947; Porvoo, Finland	(aged 79)	12 February 2019	20 December 2019	20 December 2024
