= Anders Österling =

Swedish poet and writer (1884–1981)

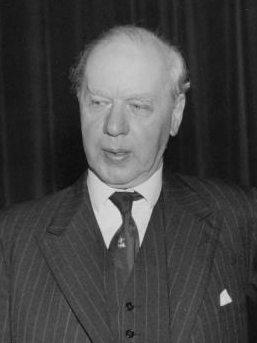
- Österling in 1962
- Born: Anders Johan Österling; 13 April 1884; Helsingborg, Sweden
- Died: 13 December 1981 (aged 97); Stockholm, Sweden
- Occupations: poet, critic, translator

Member of the Swedish Academy (Seat No. 13)
- In office 20 December 1919 – 13 December 1981
- Preceded by: Karl Alfred Melin
- Succeeded by: Gunnel Vallquist

Permanent Secretary of the Swedish Academy
- In office December 1941 – June 1964
- Preceded by: Per Hallström
- Succeeded by: Karl Ragnar Gierow

Anders Österling (13 April 1884 – 13 December 1981) was a Swedish poet, critic and translator. In 1919 he was elected as a member of the Swedish Academy when he was 35 years old and served the academy for 62 years, longer than any other member. He was the academy's permanent secretary between 1941 and 1964, member of the Nobel committee from 1921 and the committees chairman between 1947 and 1970.

== Biography ==
Anders Österling was born in Helsingborg in 1884. His father was a newspaper editor and publisher. Österling studied in Malmö and Lund and after completing exams in literature history, art history and philosophy at Lund University in 1909 he worked part time at the University Library in Lund until 1918.

Anders Österling debuted as a poet in 1904 and went on to publish 15 collections of poems over seven decades, his last collection Ögonblick ("Moments") was published in 1978. As a poet Österling took international influences from British, French, German and Danish poetry and William Wordsworth remained a main influence, but eventually his poetry became more Swedish in tone.

Österling was active as a critic for 75 years, from 1902 to 1977, initially in Skånska Dagbladet, then primarily in Svenska Dagbladet, from 1936 to 1966 in Stockholms-Tidningen, and then in Sydsvenska Dagbladet. At the age of 80 he had published more than 5000 articles and reviews, and went on to publish hundreds more in his later years. Throughout his life Österling had a particular interest in introducing literature from abroad in the form of articles, translations and anthologies.

Österling also wrote plays, biographical notes, travel books and worked as a publisher for Bonniers. He translated works by John Galsworthy, Johann Wolfgang von Goethe and Eugene O'Neill, but primarily he was a prolific translator of poetry, including T.S. Eliot, Hermann Hesse and the Italian poets Giuseppe Ungaretti, Salvatore Quasimodo and Eugenio Montale. Several of the authors Österling translated was awarded the Nobel Prize in Literature.

Anders Österling was elected a member of the Swedish Academy at the age of 35 in 1919 and served the Nobel Prize awarding institution for 62 years, longer than any other individual. He was appointed permanent secretary of the academy in 1941 and remained on the position until 1964. He was a member of the Nobel committee for 60 years from 1921 and the committees chairman between 1947 and 1970.

At the age of 97, Anders Österling died on 13 December 1981.

Cultural offices
Preceded by Karl Alfred Melin	Swedish Academy, Seat No.13 -1982	Succeeded by Gunnel Vallquist
