= Peter Englund =

Swedish author and historian

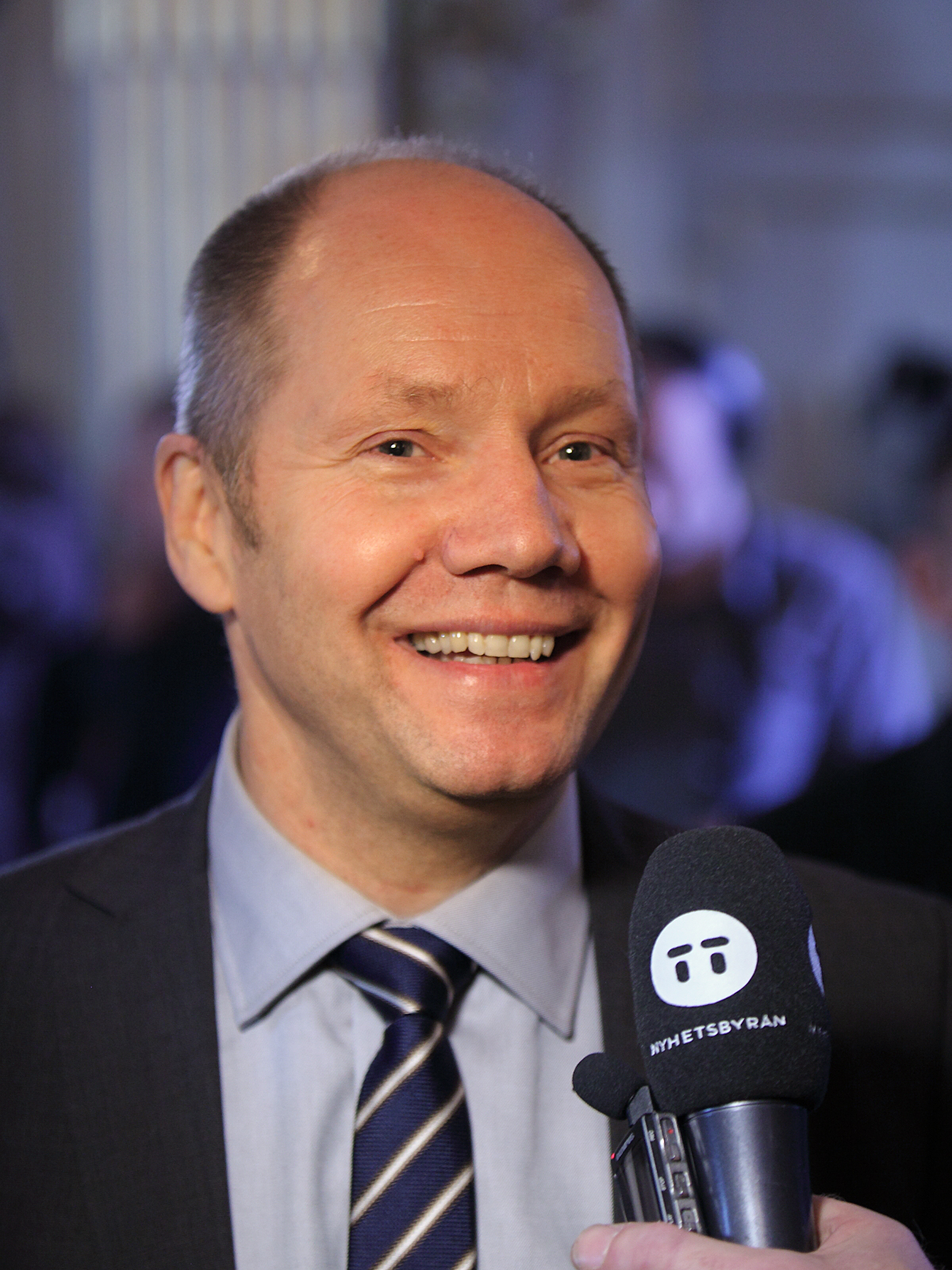
- Peter Englund in 2013
- Born: 4 April 1957 (age 69); Boden, Sweden
- Education: Uppsala University (Ph.D.)
- Occupations: author and historian; former Permanent Secretary of the Swedish Academy
- Children: 5
- Awards: August Prize (1993); Selma Lagerlöf Prize for Literature (2002)

Member of the Swedish Academy (Seat No. 10)
- Incumbent
- Assumed office 20 December 2002
- Preceded by: Erik Lönnroth

Permanent Secretary of the Swedish Academy
- In office June 2009 – May 2015
- Preceded by: Horace Engdahl
- Succeeded by: Sara Danius
- Website: www.peterenglund.com

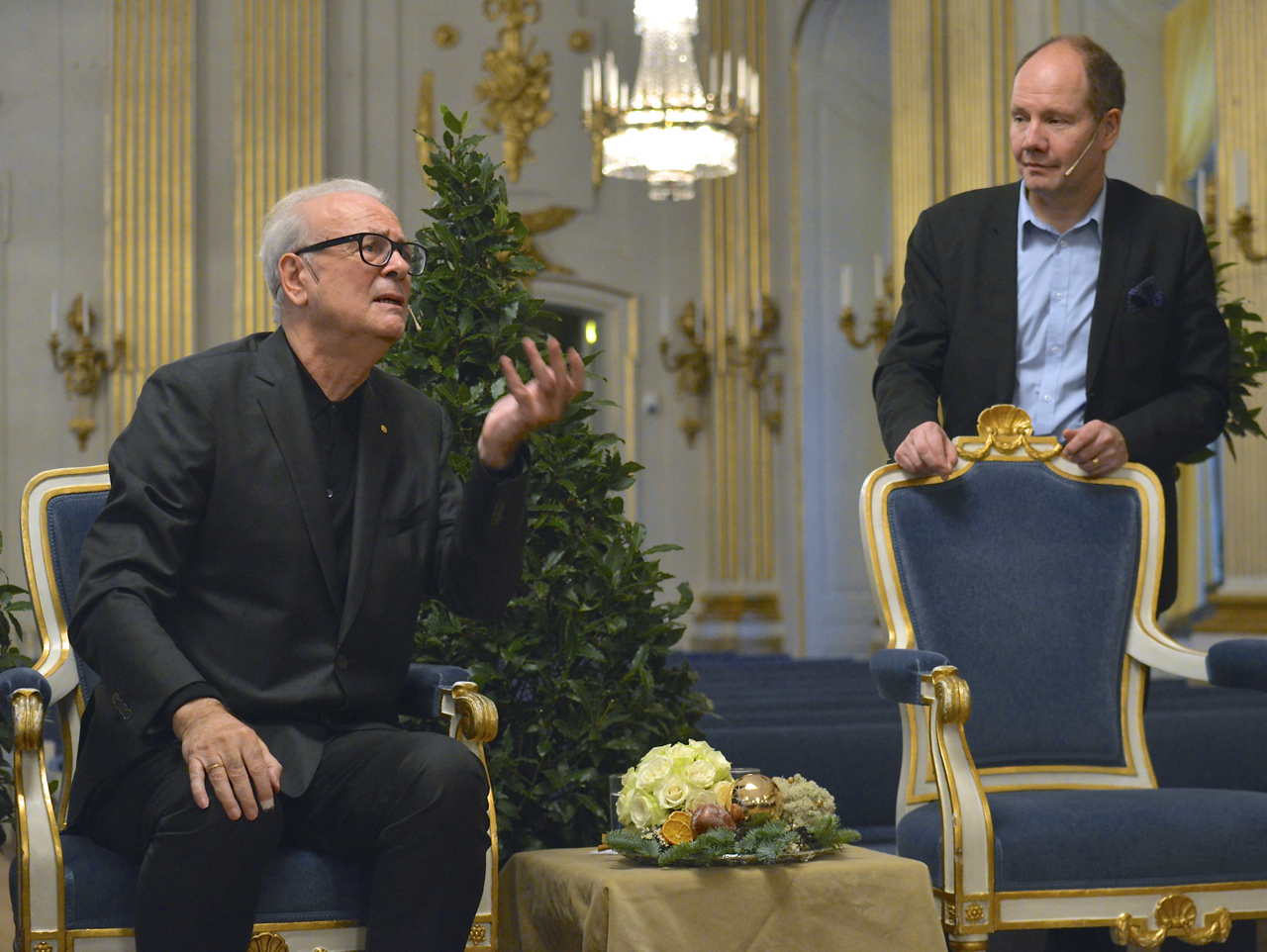
Patrick Modiano and Peter Englund 2014.

Peter Mikael Englund (born 4 April 1957) is a Swedish author and historian. He focuses on writing non-fiction books and essays, mostly about the Swedish Empire and other historical events. Englund is known for his accessible writing style, which includes narrative details that are often left out in traditional history books. His works have been translated into 20 languages. From 2009 to 2015, Englund served as the permanent secretary of the Swedish Academy, before being succeeded by Sara Danius. In January 2019, he and fellow academy member Kjell Espmark announced their return as active members of the Swedish academy, where they had been inactive since April 2018.

== Biography ==
Englund was born in Boden and studied a preparatory course for the caring professions for two years and then humanistic subjects for another two years in secondary school. He was then conscripted and served 15 months in the Swedish Army at the Norrbotten Regiment located in Boden. He was politically active in his youth and supported the National Front for the Liberation of Vietnam.

Englund studied archaeology, history, and theoretical philosophy at Uppsala University, completing a bachelor's degree in 1983, after which he began doctoral studies in History. He was awarded his Ph.D. in 1989 for his dissertation Det hotade huset (English title in the dissertation abstract: A House in Peril) (1989), an investigation of the worldview of the 17th-century Swedish nobility. During his period as a doctoral student, he had also worked for some time for the Swedish Military Intelligence and Security Service ("MUST"), and the year before receiving his doctorate he had published the bestselling Poltava, a detailed description of the Battle of Poltava, where the troops of Swedish king Charles XII were defeated by the Russian army of Tsar Peter I in 1709.

Englund has received the August Prize (1993) and the Selma Lagerlöf Prize for Literature (2002). He was elected a member of the Swedish Academy in 2002. On 1 June 2009, he succeeded Horace Engdahl as the permanent secretary of the Academy.

In 2009, Englund "criticized the jury panel as being too 'Eurocentric'" and "told the Associated Press that it was easier for Europeans to relate to European literature". "It’s the result of psychological bias that we really try to be aware of," Englund was quoted as saying. In December 2014, he announced his retirement from the post of secretary of the Swedish Academy. On 1 June 2015, Sara Danius succeeded Peter Englund as permanent secretary.

On 6 April 2018, Englund announced that he would no longer participate in the Academy's work. On the same day, Klas Östergren and Kjell Espmark also declared that they would become inactive members of the Academy.

On 10 January 2019, Englund announced on his blog that he and fellow Academy member Kjell Espmark would be returning as active members of the Academy. He stated that continued work to renew the Academy has now reached a point that it must be done from within.

== Bibliography ==
- Holowczyn: Battle of the Moscow Road (boardgame, 1980)
- Peter the Great (boardgame, 1980)
- Poltava ("Poltava") (1988)
- Det hotade huset ("A House in Peril") (1989)
- Förflutenhetens landskap ("The Landscape of Times Past") (1991), collection of essays
- Ofredsår ("Years of War") (1993), Sweden during Thirty Years' War with Erik Dahlberg at the centre of the book
- Brev från nollpunkten ("Letters from Ground Zero") (1996), collection of essays about modern history
- Den oövervinnerlige ("The Invincible") (2000), on Sweden's period as a Great Power. Sequel to Ofredsår
- Erik Lönnroth : inträdestal i Svenska akademien (2002)
- Tystnadens historia och andra essäer ("History of Silence") (2003), collection of essays
- Jag skall dundra (2005)
- Spegelscener : minnesfragment från fyra krig (2006)
- Silvermasken ("The Silver Mask") (2006), a short biography of Queen Kristina of Sweden
- Stridens skönhet och sorg ("The Beauty and the Sorrow") (2008), a biography-based book about 20 people who lived during World War I
- Det stora svalget : en finlandssvensk i första världskriget (2010)
- 1914 Stridens skönhet och sorg : Första världskrigets inledande år i 68 korta kapitel (2014)
- 1915 Stridens skönhet och sorg : Första världskrigets andra år i 108 korta kapitel (2015)
- 1916 Stridens skönhet och sorg (2015)
- Söndagsvägen (2020)
- Onda nätters drömmar : November 1942 och andra världskrigets vändpunkt i 360 korta kapitel (2022); English, November 1942: An Intimate History of the Turning Point of World War II (trans. Peter Graves; Knopf, 2023)

Cultural offices
Preceded by Erik Lönnroth	Swedish Academy, Seat No.10; 2002–	Succeeded by incumbent
