= Swedish Academy =

Swedish Royal Academy

Coordinates: 59°19′31″N 18°4′14″E

- Svenska Akademien

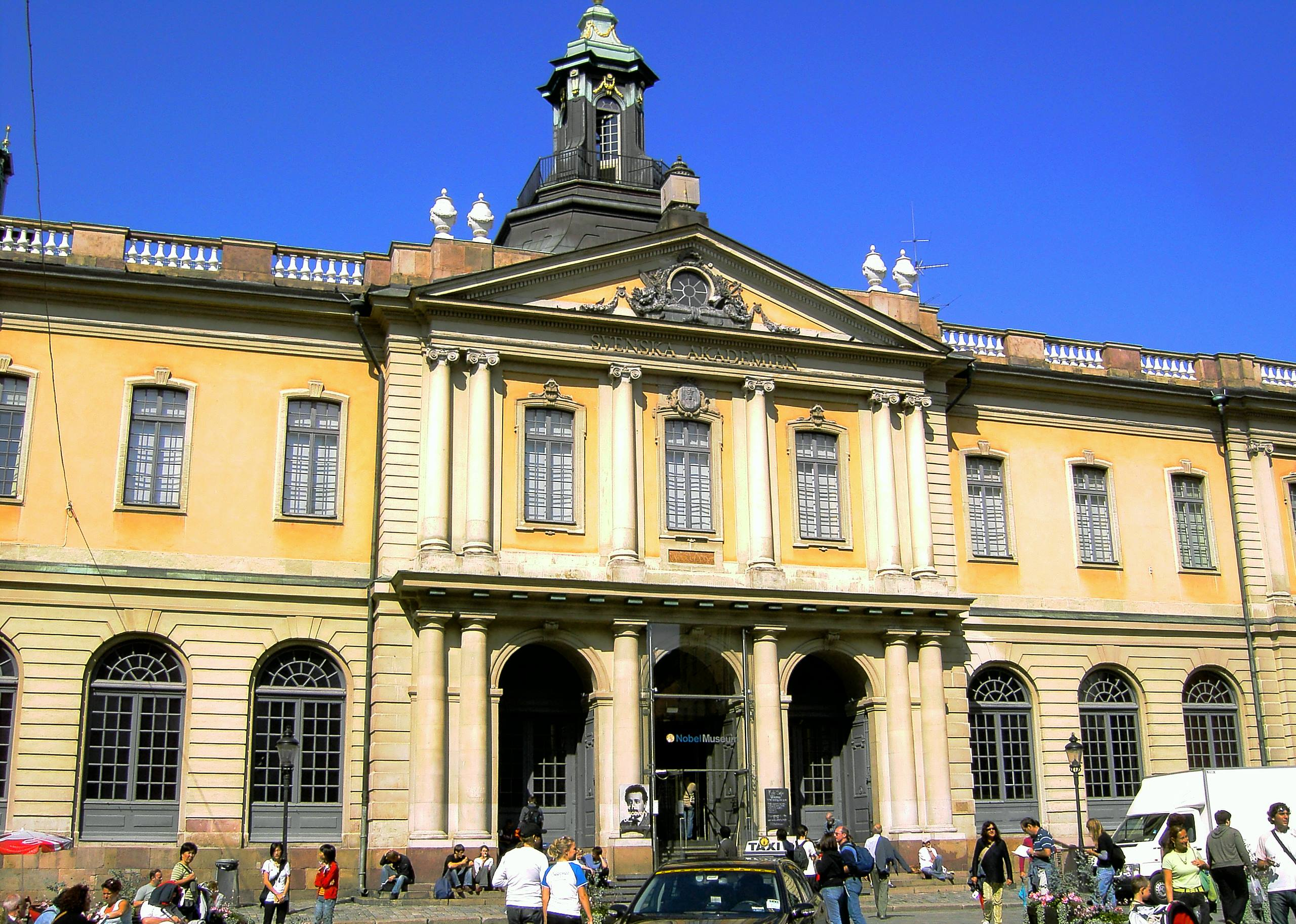
- Headquarters
- Formation: 20 March 1786; 240 years ago
- Type: Royal academy
- Headquarters: Stock Exchange Building, Stockholm
- Members: 18 members
- Permanent secretary: Ingrid Carlberg
- Website: svenskaakademien.se

The Swedish Academy (Swedish: Svenska Akademien), founded in 1786 by King Gustav III, is one of the Royal Academies of Sweden. Its 18 members, who are elected for life, comprise the highest Swedish language authority. Outside Scandinavia, it is best known as the body that chooses the laureates for the annual Nobel Prize in Literature, awarded in memory of the donor Alfred Nobel.

== History ==
Official logo of the academy

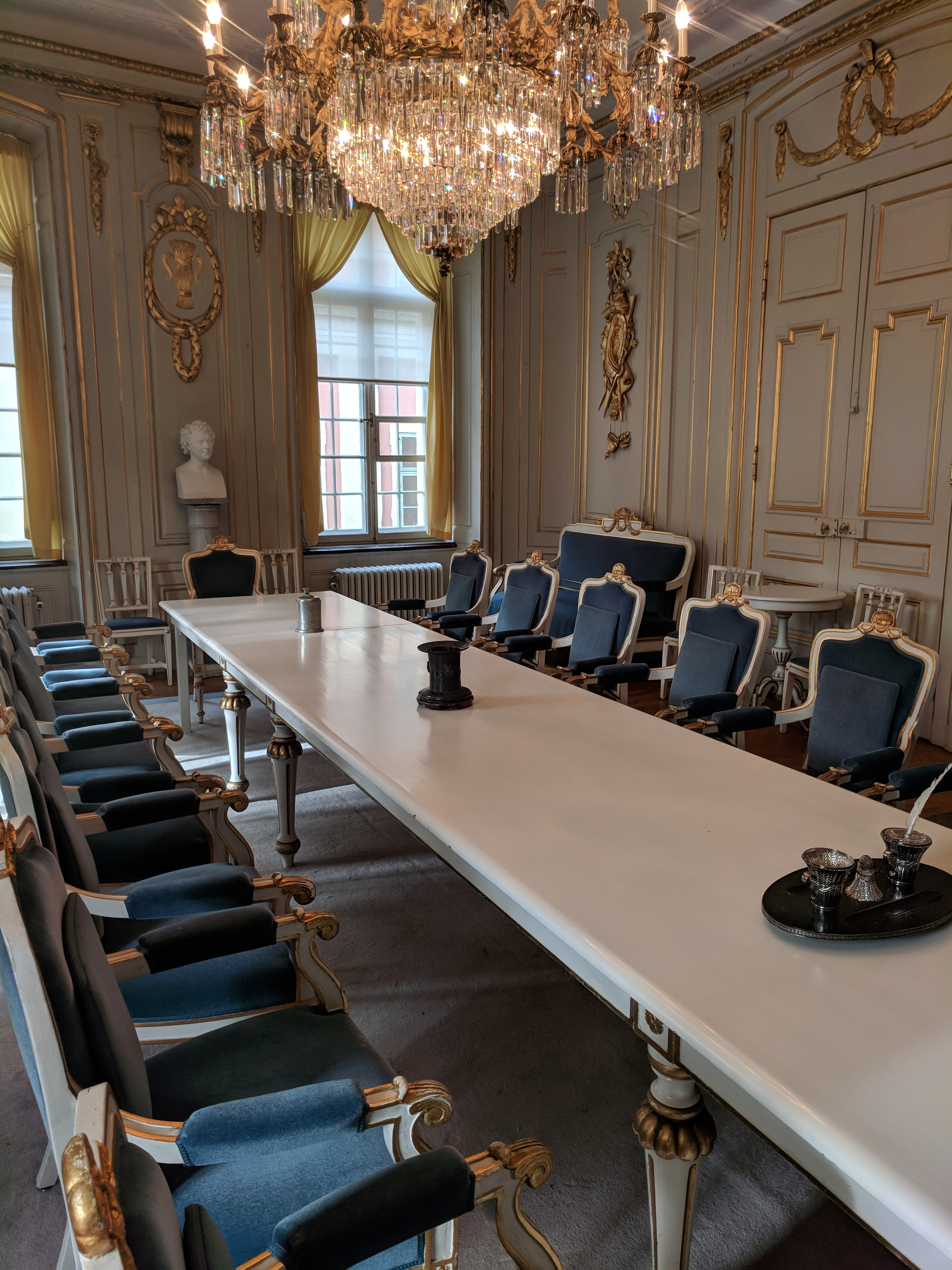

The Swedish Academy was founded in 1786 by King Gustav III. It is modelled after the Académie française and has 18 members. It is said that Gustaf III originally intended there to be twenty members, half the number of those in the French Academy, but eventually decided on eighteen because the Swedish expression De Aderton (Note: Aderton is an archaic spelling of Arton.) – 'The Eighteen' – had such a fine solemn ring. The academy's motto is "Talent and Taste" (Swedish: Snille och smak), and its stated primary purpose is to "work on the Swedish language's purity, strength and sublimity".

The academy's statutes was drawn up by Gustav III himself. The specified tasks for the Academy included to compile a dictionary of the Swedish language and arrange annual competitions in oratory and poetry on given themes. Moreover, Gustav instructed that the Academy would hold an annual grand ceremony on 20 December, and that a medal would be struck every year to commemorate a prominent Swede.

In the wake of Gustav's death in 1792 the standings of the academy deteriorated, but the institution nevertheless managed to maintain its position as the nations highest authority in literary and linguistic matters.

After having flourished in the mid-19th century, by the end of the century the academy, fiercely negative to new literary movements, had deteriorated and was not looked upon favourably.

After some initial hesitation, by the turn of the 20th century the academy accepted the task of awarding the Nobel Prize in Literature, and soon after a modernisation of the academy began with several new school writers and its first female member, Selma Lagerlöf, elected.

=== Headquarters ===
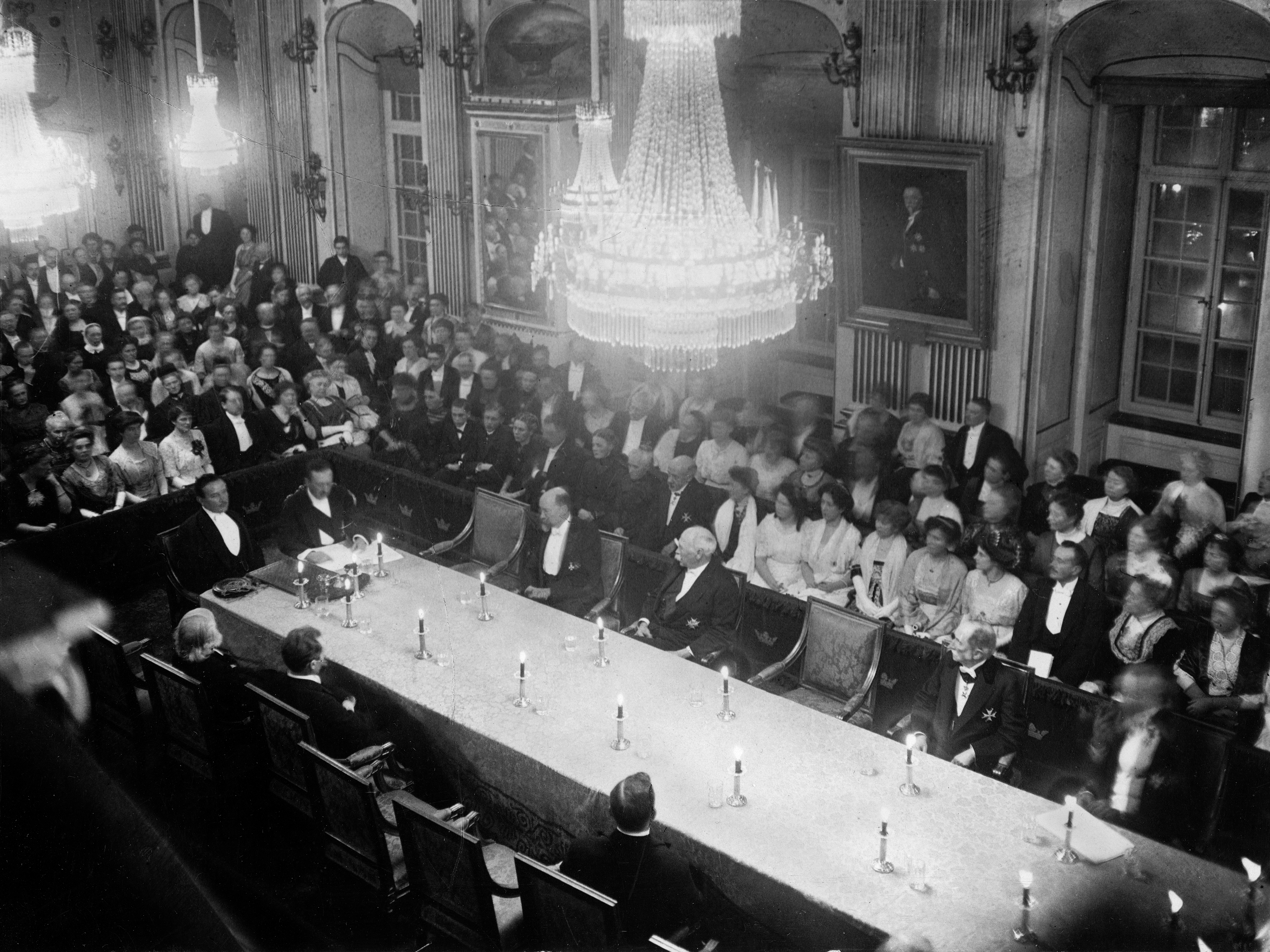
Sven Hedin giving the inaugural address at the Swedish Academy in 1913.

The building now known as the Stockholm Stock Exchange Building was built for the bourgeoisie. The bottom floor was used as a trading exchange (this later became the stock exchange), and the upper floor was used for balls, New Year's Eve parties, etc. When the academy was founded, the ballroom was the biggest room in Stockholm that could be heated and thus used in the winter, so the King asked if he could borrow it.

The academy has had its annual meeting there every year since, attended by members of the Swedish royal family. However, it was not until 1914 that the academy gained permanent use of the upper floor as their own. It is here that the academy meets and, among other business, announces the names of Nobel Prize laureates. This task arguably makes the academy one of the world's most influential literary bodies.

The Swedish King is the only person who, apart from the members, has the right to attend the meetings of the academy. On 3 March 2022 the Swedish King attended a weekly academy meeting, the first time a Swedish king has done so in over 200 years.

=== Members ===
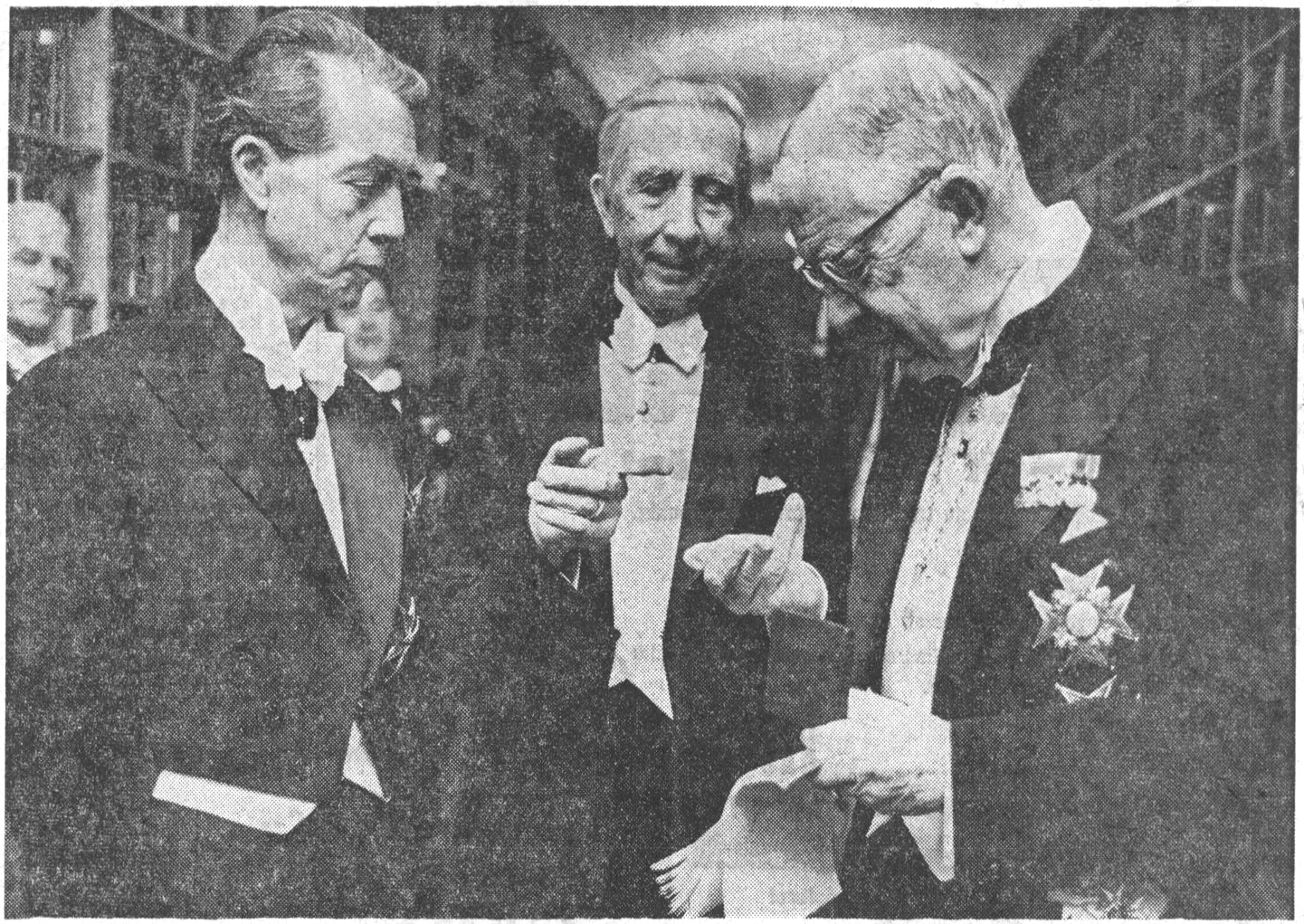
Academy members Karl Ragnar Gierow and Henry Olsson with the Swedish king Gustav VI Adolf, 1966.

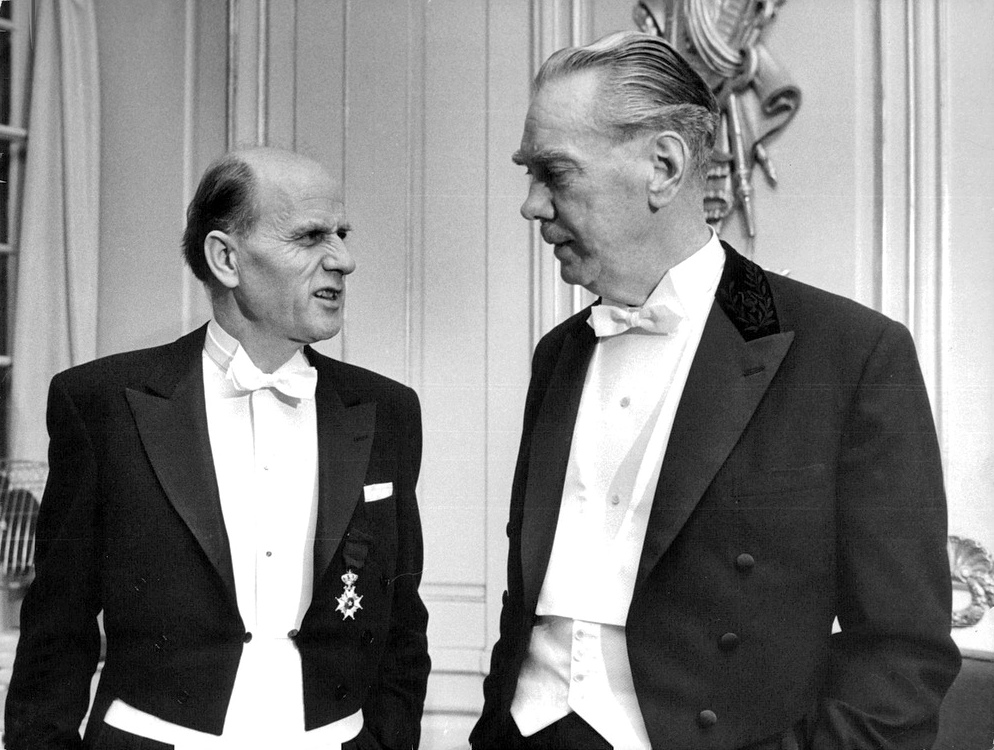
The newly elected members Sten Lindroth and Artur Lundkvist at the Swedish Academy in 1968.

Members are elected by a secret ballot in the Academy and before the result is made public it must be submitted to the Academy's Patron, the King of Sweden, for his approval. Members of the Academy include writers, linguists, literary scholars, historians and a prominent jurist. Initially writers were in the minority in the Academy, but during the twentieth century the number of writers grew to represent more than half of The Eighteen. The Swedish Academy has a long history of being a heavily male-dominated institution, but the Academy has recently moved towards better equality. Since 20 December 2019 one third of the chairs belong to female Academy members.

Prior to 2018 it was not possible for members of the academy to resign; membership was for life, although the academy could decide to exclude members. This happened twice to Gustaf Mauritz Armfelt, who was excluded in 1794, re-elected in 1805 and excluded again in 1811. In 1989, members Kerstin Ekman and Lars Gyllensten chose to stop participating in the meetings of the academy, over its refusal to express support for Salman Rushdie when Ayatollah Khomeini condemned him to death for The Satanic Verses, shortly after a third member, Werner Aspenström, also stopped participating in the meetings for unspecified reasons. In 2005, Knut Ahnlund made the same decision, as a protest against the choice of Elfriede Jelinek as Nobel laureate for 2004, calling her work "unenjoyable, violent pornography", and stating that awarding her the prize had "caused irreparable harm to the value of the award for the foreseeable future". On 25 November 2017, Lotta Lotass said in an interview that she had not participated in the meetings of the academy for more than two years and did not consider herself a member any more.

=== Assets ===
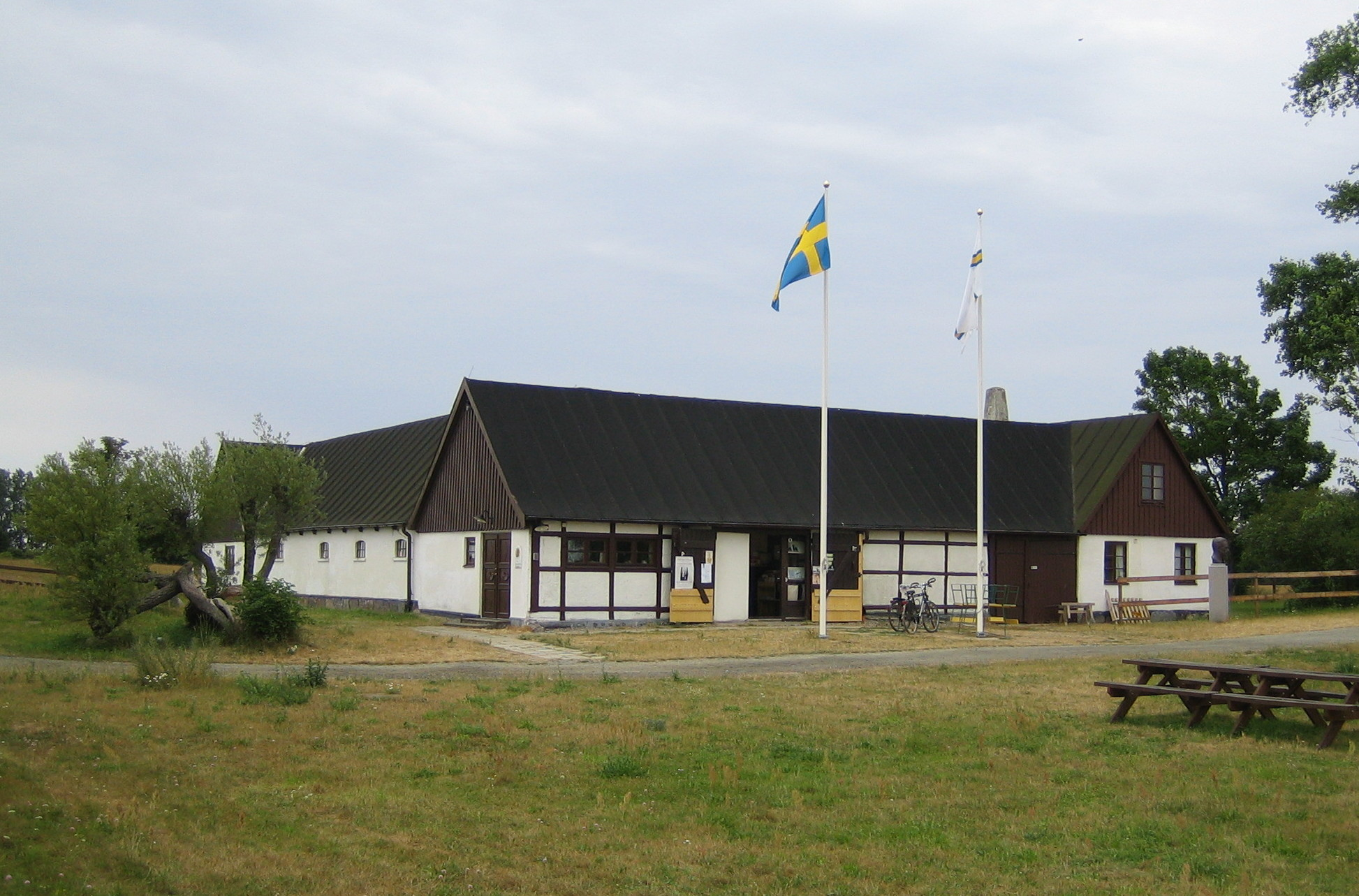
Dag Hammarskjöld's farm in Backåkra, used as a retreat for academy members

Dag Hammarskjöld's former farm at Backåkra, close to Ystad in southern Sweden, was bought in 1957 as a summer residence by Hammarskjöld, then Secretary-General of the United Nations (1953–1961). The south wing of the farm is reserved as a summer retreat for the 18 members of the Swedish Academy, of which Hammarskjöld was a member.

On 11 April 2019, the academy published its financial statements for the first time in its history. According to it, the academy owned financial assets worth 1.58 billion Swedish kronor at the end of 2018 (equal to $170M, €150M, or £130M).

== The Academy's dictionaries ==
In pursuance of its goals of maintaining and strengthening the Swedish language, the Academy publishes three dictionaries. The first is a one-volume spelling dictionary called Svenska Akademiens ordlista (SAOL), which is in its 15th edition as of 2026. The second is a multi-volume dictionary (39 volumes), edited on principles similar to those of the Oxford English Dictionary, entitled Svenska Akademiens Ordbok (SAOB), the first volume of which was published in 1893 and the last one in 2023. The third is a two-volume dictionary edited at Gothenburg University and titled Svensk ordbok utgiven av Svenska Akademien ('Swedish dictionary published by the Swedish Academy'); it covers modern Swedish and includes pronunciations, etymologies etc, as well as definitions and some examples. In addition to printed publications, all three dictionaries are also available to access free of charge online at svenska.se.

In addition to the dictionaries the Academy has also published a four-volume grammar of the Swedish language (Svenska Akademiens grammatik, SAG) aimed at researchers, linguists and university students among others, as well as a single-volume counterpart for those requiring something less comprehensive (Svenska Akademiens språklära, SAS).

== Awards and prizes ==
The Swedish Academy annually awards nearly 50 different prizes and scholarships, most of them for domestic Swedish authors. Common to all is that they are awarded without competition and without application.

=== The Nobel Prize in Literature ===
Since 1901, the Swedish Academy has annually decided who will be the laureate for the Nobel Prize in Literature, awarded in memory of the donor Alfred Nobel. It is awarded at a ceremony on 10 December with the laureate receiving a medal, a diploma and, as of 2024, 11 million Swedish crowns.

=== The Great Prize ===
Swedish: Stora Priset, literally the Great Prize, was instituted by King Gustav III. The prize, which consists of a single gold medal, is the most prestigious award that can be awarded by the Swedish Academy. It has been awarded to, among others, Selma Lagerlöf (1904 and 1909), Herbert Tingsten (1966), Astrid Lindgren (1971), Evert Taube (1972) and Tove Jansson (1994).

=== Dobloug Prize ===
The Dobloug Prize, one of the Academy's largest prizes at $40,000, is a literature prize awarded for Swedish and Norwegian fiction. It was first awarded in 1951 to Arnulf Øverland and Eyvind Johnson. Since 1985, two authors from each country are awarded.

=== The Nordic Prize ===
The Swedish Academy Nordic Prize was established at the Swedish Academy's 200th jubilee in 1986 and with a prize sum of 400 000 Swedish crowns is the largest prize the Academy awards after the Nobel Prize in Literature. Among others, it has been awarded to William Heinesen (1987), Tomas Tranströmer (1991), Inger Christensen (1992), Klaus Rifbjerg (1999), Lars Norén (2003), Jon Fosse (2007), Per Olov Enquist (2010), Kjell Askildsen (2011), Sofi Oksanen (2013), Dag Solstad (2017) and Karl Ove Knausgård (2019).

=== Bellman Prize ===
Bellmanpriset was established in 1920 in memory of Carl Michael Bellman and is awarded to "a truly outstanding Swedish poet". Among others, it has been awarded to Pär Lagerkvist, Anders Österling, Hjalmar Gullberg, Evert Taube, Harry Martinson, Gunnar Ekelöf, Nils Ferlin, Erik Lindegren, Artur Lundkvist, Johannes Edfelt, Werner Aspenström, Lars Forssell and Katarina Frostenson.

=== Theatre Prize ===
The Swedish Academy Theatre Prize (or Award) (Svenska Akademiens teaterpris) is awarded by the academy to recognise stage performers, theatre directors, and playwrights. The inaugural prize was awarded in 1963, in conjunction with the Royal Dramatic Theatre on its 175th anniversary. in 2025 the prize, which was won by the actor Göran Ragnerstam in that year, was worth 100,000 Swedish kronor.

=== Royal Prize ===
Kungliga priset (The Royal Prize) was established in 1835 by the Swedish king Karl XIV Johan and is awarded to significant achievements in the Academy's fields of operation.

=== Other prizes ===
The Swedish Academy also awards a number of other prizes and scholarships to authors, scholars, teachers, and librarians.

== Current members ==
The current members of the Swedish Academy listed by seat number:

Seat	Picture	Member	Born	Age	Elected	Notes
1.		Eric M. Runesson	1960	66	2018	
2.		Bo Ralph	1945	81	1999	
3.		David Håkansson	1978	47	2023	
4.		Anders Olsson	1949	77	2008	Permanent secretary 1 June 2018 – 1 June 2019
5.		Ingrid Carlberg	1961	64	2020	Permanent secretary since 1 June 2026
6.		Tomas Riad	1959	67	2011	
7.		Åsa Wikforss	1961	65	2019	
8.		Jesper Svenbro	1944	82	2006	
9.		Ellen Mattson	1962	64	2019	
10.		Peter Englund	1957	69	2002	Permanent secretary 2009–2015.
11.		Mats Malm	1964	62	2018	Permanent secretary 2019–2026.
12.		Per Wästberg	1933	93	1997	
13.		Anne Swärd	1969	57	2019	
14.		Steve Sem-Sandberg	1958	68	2020	
15.		Jila Mossaed	1948	78	2018	
16.		Anna-Karin Palm	1961	65	2023	
17.		Horace Engdahl	1948	77	1997	Permanent secretary 1999–2009
18.		Anna Hallberg	1975	51	2026	

=== Permanent secretaries ===
Order	Seat	Picture	Permanent Secretary of the Swedish Academy	Born	Years	Notes
1.	11.		Nils von Rosenstein	1752	1786–1824	
2.	13.		Frans Michael Franzén	1772	1824–1834	
3.	12.		Bernhard von Beskow	1796	1834–1868	
4.	5.		Johan Erik Rydqvist	1800	1868–1869	pro tempore
5.	15.		Ludvig Manderström	1806	1869–1872	
6.	12.		Carl Gustaf Strandberg	1825	1872–1874	pro tempore
7.	9.		Henning Hamilton	1814	1874–1881	
8.	11.		Bror Emil Hildebrand	1806	1881–1883	pro tempore
9.	8.		Carl David af Wirsén	1842	1883–1912	pro tempore in 1883–84
10.	6.		Hans Hildebrand	1842	1912–1913	pro tempore
11.	11.		Erik Axel Karlfeldt	1864	1913–1931	
12.	14.		Per Hallström	1866	1931–1941	
13.	13.		Anders Österling	1884	1941–1964	
14.	7.		Karl Ragnar Gierow	1904	1964–1977	
15.	14.		Lars Gyllensten	1921	1977–1986	
16.	3.		Sture Allén	1928	1986–1999	
17.	17.		Horace Engdahl	1948	1999–2009	
18.	10.		Peter Englund	1957	2009–2015	
19.	7.		Sara Danius	1962	2015–2018	
20.	4.		Anders Olsson	1949	2018–2019	pro tempore April–June 2018
21.	11.		Mats Malm	1964	2019–2026	
22.	5.		Ingrid Carlberg	1961	2026–	

=== Controversies ===
==== 1794–1795 Armfelt Conspiracy and suspension of the Academy ====
In the wake of the Academy's founder King Gustav III's death in 1792, the standing of the Swedish Academy deteriorated. In 1794, member Gustav Mauritz Armfelt was excluded from the Academy after being sentenced for treason for a conspiracy against the Swedish government, and in 1795 the Academy was suspended altogether for two years on political grounds. Armfelt was eventually reinstated in the Academy in 1805, but after being forced to exile in Russia following the coup of 1809, he was again excluded from the Academy in 1811.

==== 1881 Henning Hamilton affair ====
In 1881, member Henning Hamilton was excluded from the Academy after being found guilty of embezzlement through falsifying a relative's signature.

==== 1989 Rushdie affair ====
Following the Academy meeting on 23 February 1989, members Kerstin Ekman and Lars Gyllensten resigned from their seats in protest to the Academy's refusal to condemn Iran's death decree against writer Salman Rushdie for his novel The Satanic Verses, which was considered blasphemous by some Muslims. "I am so disappointed and sad that the Academy couldn't choose sides for or against Rushdie," Ekman said. "The academy should have supported Rushdie, it is a question of freedom of speech." Gyllensten said: "Death threats and oppression from Iranian fundamentalists are violations of everything the Academy stands for." Shortly after, a third member, Werner Aspenström, also left his seat. Aspenström did not reveal his reasons for resigning but indicated support for a stronger statement by the Academy on the Rushdie case. At the time it was not possible for a member to formally resign and be replaced, as they were elected for life, so the number of Academy members were reduced following the controversy.

The Academy's decision to stay with its traditional policy not to make any political statements in an effort to avoid any accusations of a politicization of the Nobel Prize in Literature was heavily criticized by various commentators in the Swedish press.

In March 2016, the Swedish Academy condemned the death warrant against Salman Rushdie.

==== 2018 controversies ====
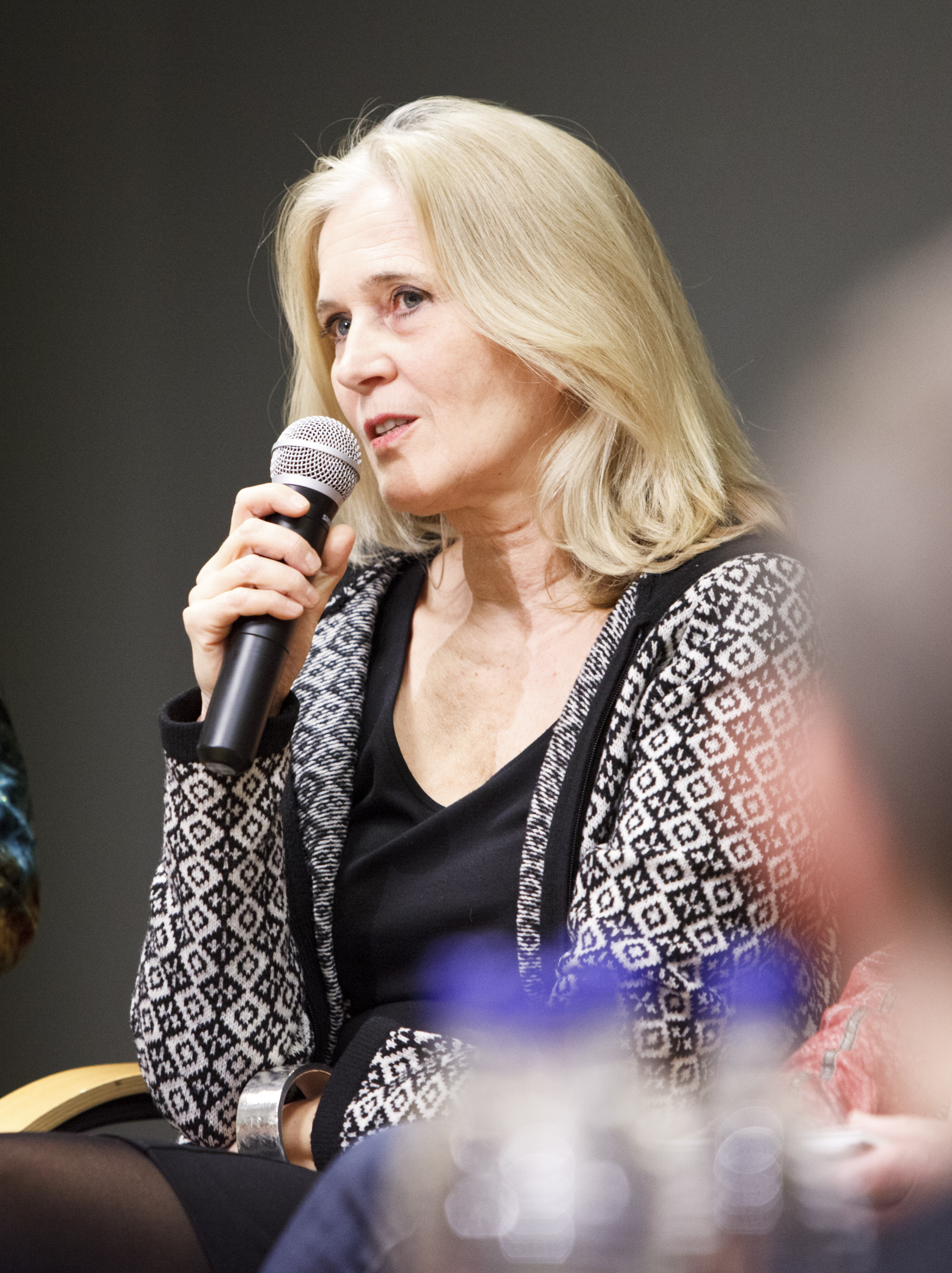
Katarina Frostenson (Seat 18) was accused of leaking classified information from the Nobel Committee's deliberations, and her husband accused of sexual assaults and harassments.

In April 2018, three Swedish Academy members (Klas Östergren, Kjell Espmark, and Peter Englund) resigned in response to a sexual-misconduct investigation involving author Jean-Claude Arnault, who is married to the member Katarina Frostenson. Arnault was accused of sexual assault and harassment by at least 18 women. He and his wife were also accused of leaking the names of prize recipients on at least seven occasions so friends could profit from online bets. He denied all accusations, although he was later convicted of rape and sentenced to two years and six months in prison. Sara Danius, the permanent secretary, hired a law firm to investigate if Frostenson had violated the Academy's regulations by leaking any confidential information and whether Arnault had any influence on the Academy, but no legal action was taken. The investigation caused a division among the members of the Academy. Following a vote to stop Frostenson's membership, the three members resigned in protest over the decisions made by the Academy. Two former permanent secretaries, Sture Allén and Horace Engdahl, called Danius a weak leader.

On 10 April, Danius was requested to resign from her position by the Academy, bringing the number of empty seats to four. Although the Academy voted against removing Katarina Frostenson from the committee, she voluntarily agreed to withdraw from participating in the academy, bringing the total of withdrawals to five. Because two other seats were still vacant from the Rushdie affair, this left only 11 active members. On 4 May 2018, the Swedish Academy announced that the selection of that years Nobel prize laureate would be postponed until 2019, when two laureates would be chosen. It was still technically possible to choose a 2018 laureate, as only eight active members are required to choose a recipient. However, there were concerns that the academy was not in any condition to credibly present the award.

The scandal was widely seen as damaging to the credibility of the prize and its authority. As noted by Andrew Brown in The Guardian in a lengthy deconstruction of the scandal:

The scandal has elements of a tragedy, in which people who set out to serve literature and culture discovered they were only pandering to writers and the people who hang around with them. The pursuit of excellence in art was entangled with the pursuit of social prestige. The academy behaved as if the meals in its clubhouse were as much an accomplishment as the work that got people elected there.

King Carl XVI Gustaf of Sweden said a reform of the rules may be evaluated, including the introduction of the right to resign in respect of the current lifelong membership of the committee. On 5 March 2019, it was announced that the Nobel Prize in Literature would once again be awarded, and laureates for both 2018 and 2019 would be announced together. The decision came after several changes were made to the structure of the Swedish Academy as well as to the Nobel Committee members selection, to "[restore] trust in the Academy as a prize-awarding institution". On 19 November, the Swedish Academy added five temporary external members to help its five-strong Nobel Committee in their deliberations for the 2019 and 2020 awards: author and literary translator Gun-Britt Sundström; publisher Henrik Petersen; and literary critics Mikaela Blomqvist, Rebecka Kärde and Kristoffer Leandoer. Just after two weeks, two of the newly added external members, Sundström and Leandoer, left the committee, with the latter saying the work to reform the scandal-hit Swedish Academy was taking too long. "I leave my job in the Nobel Committee because I have neither the patience nor the time to wait for the result of the work to change that has been started," Leandoer said.

== See also ==
- List of members of the Swedish Academy
- List of language regulators
- Nobel Library
- Nobel Committee for Literature
