= Swedish orthography =

Swedish alphabet, spelling, and punctuation rules

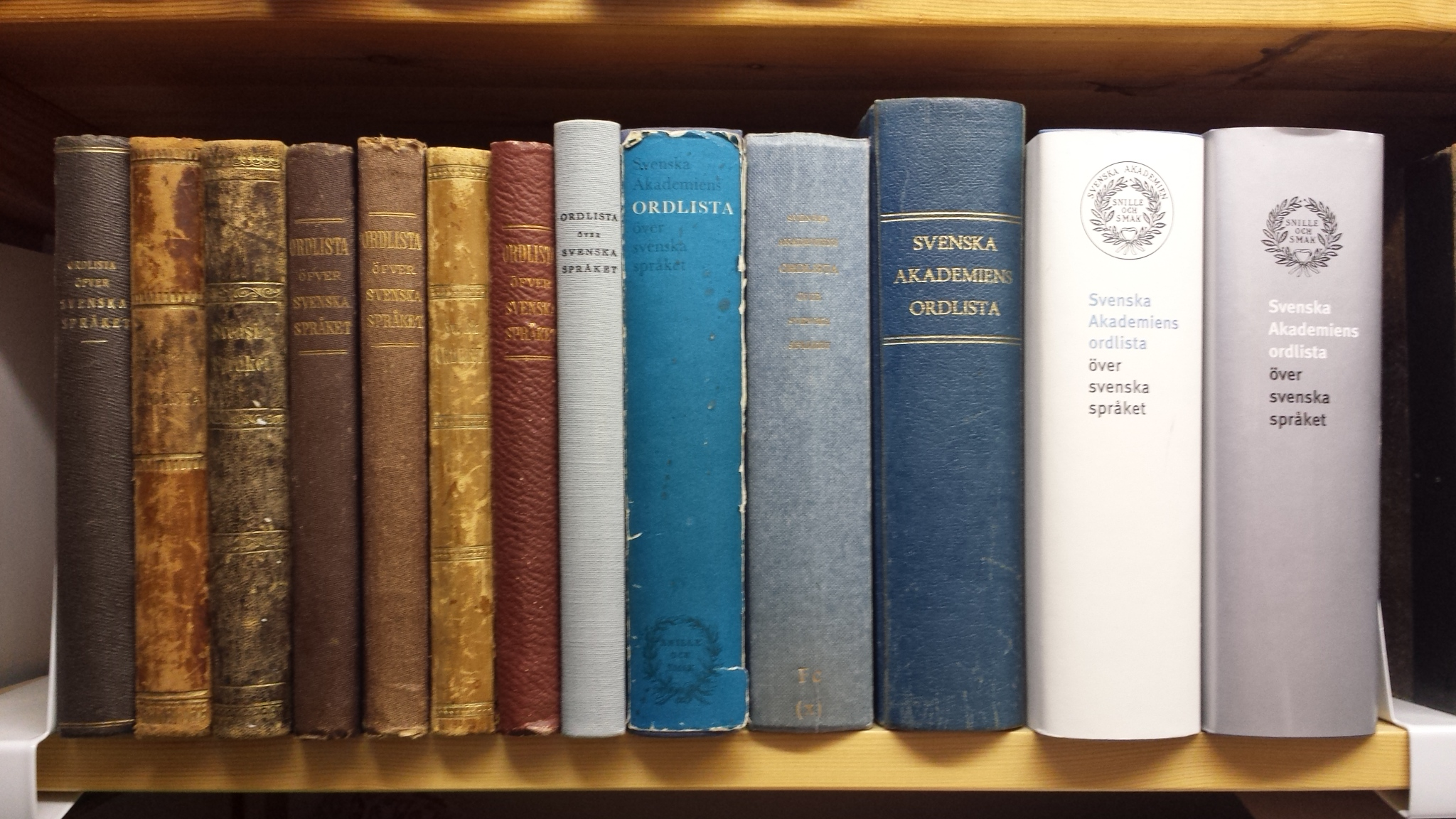
Thirteen editions (1889—2006) of Svenska Akademiens ordlista, the standard spelling dictionary of Swedish

Swedish orthography is the set of rules and conventions used for writing Swedish. The primary authority on Swedish orthography is Svenska Akademiens ordlista (SAOL), a spelling dictionary published by the Swedish Academy. The balance between describing the language and creating norms has changed with the years.

Orthography uses three distinct principles: phonologically oriented spelling, morphology-focused spelling, and traditional spelling. Through the history of written Swedish, these principles have been applied to various extents. Swedish spelling was long unregulated, but beginning in the later part of the 1700s, efforts increased to regulate spelling. In 1801, the Swedish Academy commissioned Afhandling om Svenska stafsättet, a treatise on Swedish spelling by poet Carl Gustaf af Leopold. The goal of the treatise was to create a more homogeneous spelling system, based on traditional spellings. Leopold also aimed to create more phonetic spellings for French loanwords. A later advocate for uniform spelling was Esaias Tegnér Jr.

== Alphabet ==
The Swedish alphabet is a Latin-script alphabet with 29 letters, including the modern 26-letter basic Latin alphabet, plus three extra letters: Å, Ä, and Ö. The letters Q, W, and Z are rarely used outside of loanwords and proper names.

Letter	Name	Name (IPA)
A	a	[ɑː]
B	be	[beː]
C	ce	[seː]
D	de	[deː]
E	e	[eː]
F	eff	[ɛfː]
G	ge	[ɡeː]
H	hå	[hoː]
I	i	[iː]
J	ji	[jiː]
K	kå	[koː]
L	ell	[ɛlː]
M	emm	[ɛmː]
N	enn	[ɛnː]
O	o	[uː]
P	pe	[peː]
Q	qu	[kʉː]
R	err	[ɛrː]
S	ess	[ɛsː]
T	te	[teː]
U	u	[ʉː]
V	ve	[veː]
W	dubbel-ve	[ˈdɵ̂bːɛlˌveː]
X	ex	[ɛks]
Y	y	[yː]
Z	zäta	[ˈsɛ̂ːta]
Å	å	[oː]
Ä	ä	[ɛː]
Ö	ö	[øː]

See Swedish alphabet for a detailed description of the sounds of the letters.

== Correspondence between writing and speech ==
Among phonological (sound-based) written languages such as Swedish, the degree of conformity between the graphemes of writing and phonemes of speech can vary. In Swedish, the written and spoken vowels agree well, but consonants vary significantly more. For example, there are several different graphemes for the sj-sound (as in själ, skäl, and stjäl) and the tj-sound (as in kära and tjära). This is because Swedish consonants adhere in large part to a traditional orthography, which reflects an older spoken language.

== Orthographic principles ==
=== Phonologically oriented spelling ===
Phonologically oriented (sound-oriented) spelling holds that every phoneme should correspond to a single grapheme. An example of pure phonological spelling is the word har. The word's three graphemes, ⟨har⟩, each correspond to a single phoneme, /har/. In Swedish, phonological spelling is used for vowels, with two exceptions. The most important exception is that the two graphemes ⟨e⟩ and ⟨ä⟩ are both used to indicate /ɛ/, and that the grapheme ⟨o⟩ is used for the phonemes /oː/ and /ɔ/, but also for /uː/ and /ʊ/. Another exception is in loanwords such as bag or jeep. Graphemes and phonemes do not correspond as well for consonants as for vowels.

=== Morphologically oriented spelling ===
Morphologically oriented spelling dictates that a morpheme is always spelled the same, regardless of pronunciation. For example, this principle indicates that we would spell the word as tryggt (from trygg), even though it is pronounced tryckt. This type of spelling is used sometimes, but far from always. For example, drift is spelled according to pronunciation, even though the morphologically oriented principle would suggest drivt (from the verb driva). In older Swedish, the word was spelled drifva, but this changed in the 1906 transition to a more phonetic spelling, in which godt (from god) became gott. Danish and Norwegian on the other hand have kept the older spelling godt.

=== Traditional spelling ===
Traditional spelling often reflects an older pronunciation. This is frequently the case with the sj-sound, whose phonetic symbol is [ɧ], and the tj-sound, whose symbol is [ɕ]. The sj-sound can be spelled with ⟨ch⟩, ⟨g⟩, ⟨j⟩, ⟨sch⟩, ⟨sh⟩, ⟨si⟩, ⟨sj⟩, ⟨sk⟩, ⟨skj⟩, ⟨ssi⟩, ⟨ssj⟩, ⟨stj⟩, ⟨ti⟩, and others. The phoneme [ɧ] is a sound that has arisen in Swedish since changes to ⟨sj⟩, ⟨sk⟩, ⟨skj⟩, ⟨ssj⟩, and ⟨stj⟩ were completely carried out at the end of the 18th century. The spellings ⟨si⟩, ⟨ssi⟩, and ⟨ti⟩ come from Latin, and have been adopted from German and French, in which case they're pronounced [ɧ]. In loanwords from various other languages, the pronunciation [ʃ] of ⟨ch⟩, ⟨sch⟩ and ⟨sh⟩ has been modified to the Swedish sj-sound. The Swedish [j] sound can also be spelled several different ways, including ⟨dj⟩, ⟨g⟩, ⟨gj⟩, ⟨hj⟩, ⟨j⟩, or ⟨lj⟩, similarly to the tj-sound which can be spelled with ⟨ch⟩ (in some loanwords), ⟨k⟩, ⟨kj⟩, or ⟨tj⟩. Traditional spelling therefore often results in a large difference between written and spoken language (deep orthography). Many written languages of European origin have a written language that reflects an older spoken language. The traditional spelling also indicates assimilations, which often occur when certain difficult consonant combinations are pronounced. Some words are inflected, such as grovt, in which the ⟨v⟩ is always assimilated to [f], and äldst in which the ⟨d⟩ is silent. It can also be the case with compound words like matsäck, traditionally pronounced like massäck. Sometimes the spelling can influence pronunciation, so words like gödsel, brådska, låtsas and matsäck, through spelling pronunciation, recover their silent letters.

=== Main orthographic rules ===
1. A short stressed vowel is generally followed by two or more consonants, including a double consonant: glas ('glass') has a long a, glass ('ice-cream') has a short a. However, there are some exceptions, such as jag hade ('I had') with a short a, artikel ('article') with a short i. Phonetically, a single consonant after a stressed short vowel is geminated regardless of the spelling.

2. The letter m is not doubled at the end of the word, so the short and long stressed vowels before m are not distinguished in writing. For example: fem ('five') has a short e. Exceptions: damm 'dam', lamm 'lamb', ramm 'ram' are written with mm to distinguish them from dam 'dame', lam 'lame', ram 'frame'. Derivatives of dom 'doom' and Rom 'Rome' conserve the single m. Also, the double m is simplified before another consonant: gammal 'old' — gamla (plural or definite form).

3. The letter n is not doubled before d or t: tunn 'thin' — neuter tunt. Some words have a final single n after short vowels: den, in, igen, han, hon, kan, man, men, mun, ton, vän, än.

4. Some sounds ([ɧ], [ɕ], [j], also [s] in loanwords: s, c, sc, z, ps) are spelled in multiple ways following tradition, see above.

5. The sound [ŋ] is spelled n before k, g before n, and ng otherwise. However, the adjective tvungna 'forced' (plural or definite form) has ng before n following the morphological principle, as its indefinite form is tvungen.

6. Triple consonants are simplified: tillägg 'addition, appendix' from lägga till 'to add, to append'. However, hyphenation at the end of line reinstates the tripling: till-lägg.

== History ==
=== 13th to 16th centuries ===
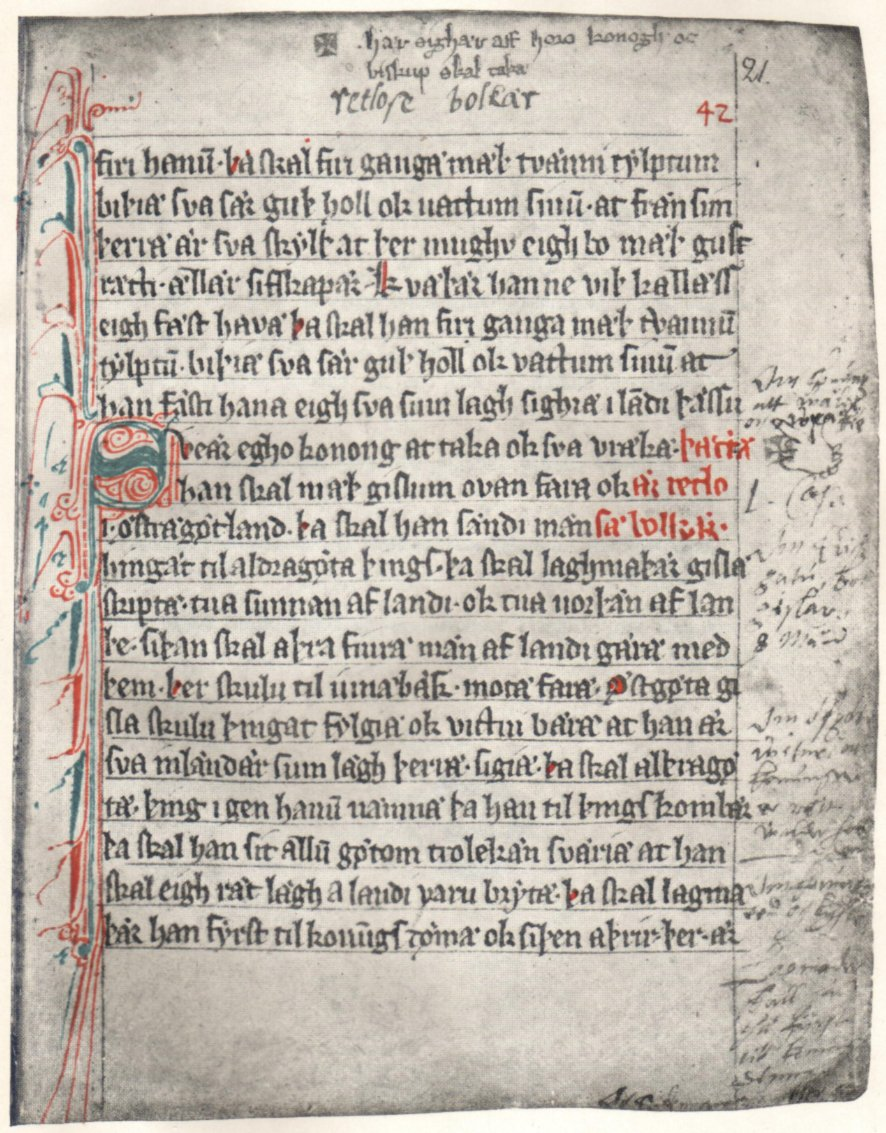
The earliest known copy of Västgötalagen, or the Westrogothic law. Written in the 1280s, it is one of the earliest examples of Swedish written with the Latin alphabet.

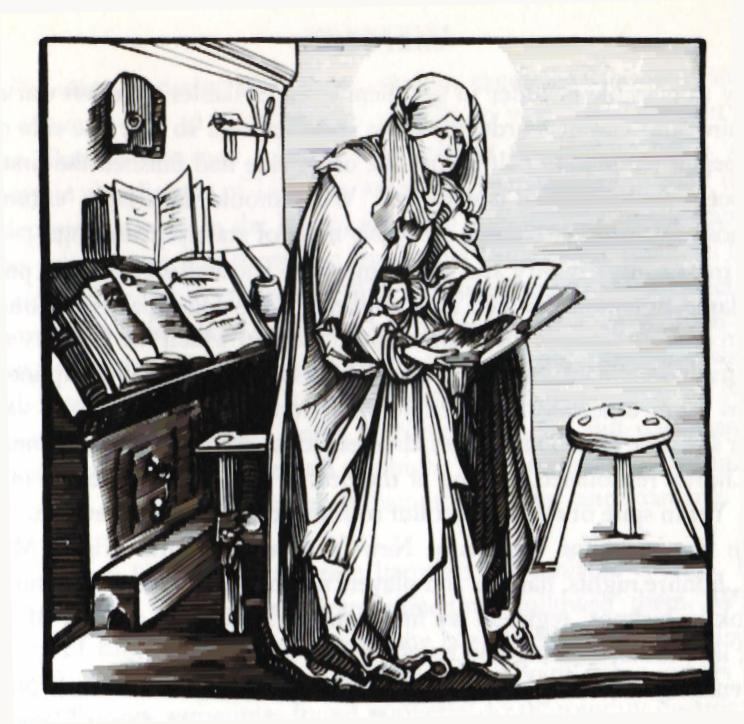
Bridget of Sweden with manuscripts

One of the earliest Swedish manuscripts is Västgötalagen, fragments of which exist from 1250. The first complete copy of the legal text was written in 1280. Medieval Swedish laws and religious texts were the first to be written in Swedish. The first changes that took place in written Swedish were the disappearance of the ⟨þ⟩ (thorn) character, which in the late 14th century was replaced with the digraphs ⟨th⟩ and ⟨dh⟩. During the 15th century, an increasing number of books of learning were produced at Vadstena Abbey, which was operated by the Bridgettine Order founded by Bridget of Sweden.

A permanently established orthography did not exist in the Middle Ages, and toward the end of this period, people were often liberal with consonants which were often doubled, as in ffonger (fånge), aff (av) and hwss (hus). Spellings also commonly included other letters that did not correspond to the pronunciation at all.

=== 16th to 18th centuries ===
Since the printing press had been introduced in Sweden during the 1400s, the new religious texts that had been written during the first half of the 16th century, after the Protestant Reformation, could be printed. In 1526 the New Testament was printed in Swedish for the first time, and in 1541 the entire Bible (Gustav Vasa Bible) was also printed in Swedish. In the Bible printings of the 1500s, the letters ⟨æ⟩ and ⟨ø⟩ were replaced with two new letters. These were ⟨a⟩ and ⟨o⟩ with a small ⟨e⟩ written above them. Later this ⟨e⟩ was replaced with two dots, and became ⟨ä⟩ and ⟨ö⟩. A new letter, ⟨å⟩, which replaced the digraph ⟨aa⟩, was used for the first time in the 1526 Bible printing.

During the 17th century, as the number of operating printing presses grew and ever increasing numbers of people worked with the texts at these printing presses, orthographic disagreement grew. For this reason, a new work was commissioned to create uniform principles for spelling. These principles were applied in a new psalm book in 1695, and in the Charles XII Bible of 1703. But because the commission did not offer any clearer directives than that the Bible should serve as an example, disagreements about spelling continued, in part because the orthography of the Bible was seen as old-fashioned. One change in the spelling at this time was that ⟨gh⟩ (indicating [ɣ]) disappeared, because this sound no longer existed in the spoken language. Other changes include the disappearance of silent ⟨h⟩ and doubled vowels in the beginning of the 18th century.

In 1732–1734, influential poet Olof von Dalin released the weekly periodical Then Swänska Argus (The Swedish Argus). This work, with its more casual and easier to read style of prose, had such a large influence on the Swedish language that the year 1732 has been dubbed the beginning of the Early New Swedish period. Some of the language experts of the Age of Liberty were influenced by Dalin as well.

During the 18th century, the written language was influenced by authors like Dalin, linguistic scholars like Jesper Swedberg, Eric Alstrin, Johan Ihre, Sven Hof, and Abraham Sahlstedt, and printers like Lars Salvius. Salvius owned a large printing company, where nearly a third of all printings took place in the 1750s and 1760s. He was interested in creating uniformity in his own printing production and, inspired by Alstrin and Ihre, therefore created a set of orthographic rules.

Cooperation between academics and printers in the 18th century resulted in an increased uniformity in Swedish orthography. The previous disorder had been partly fixed. Linguistic principles, like the principle of phonetically correct spelling for example, yielded to a new pragmatic idea that for the sake of the printing profession, rules of spelling had to be created. This resulted in Carl Gustaf af Leopold's 1801 treatise on spelling.

=== 19th century ===
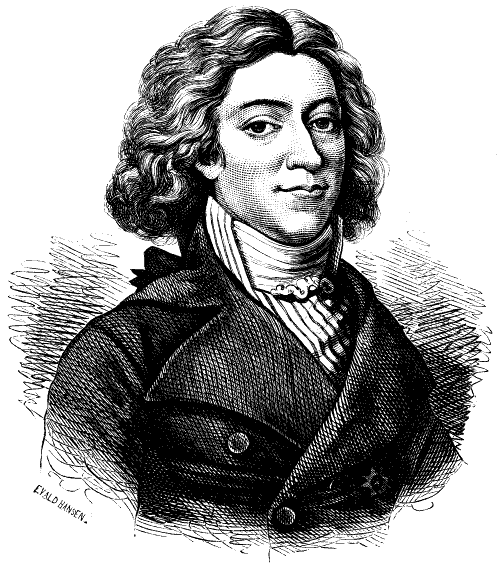
Carl Gustaf af Leopold (1756–1829)

In 1786, the Swedish Academy was founded and that same year the author Carl Gustaf af Leopold was inducted into the academy. Leopold was commissioned to create more modern rules for Swedish orthography. In 1801 his work Afhandling om Svenska stafsättet was published. In his work, Leopold wanted to standardize the spelling of loanwords, but also take a step toward a more unified spelling. According to Leopold, loanwords should adapt to Swedish pronunciation, so words like elegance and connaisseur should instead be spelled elegans and konnäsör, and words like slag and släkt should both be spelled with ⟨g⟩, because they share a common etymology. Leopold's suggestions received some opposition, but in the first edition of Svenska Akademiens ordlista in 1874, the Academy had decided to adopt Leopold's spelling of 1801.

The 19th century brought an ever more advanced etymological analysis of words, to form their "correct" spelling based on their origin. For example, there was a debate on whether nämligen should be spelled as such or as nemligen, depending on whether the original German word was nehmlich or nämlich.

==== Nordic spelling conference 1869 ====
In the summer of 1869, a meeting was held in Stockholm on proper spelling. Delegates attended from Sweden, Norway, and Denmark. The goal was that Swedish and the Norwegian-Danish spelling of that time should become closer. Foremost in the discussion was whether ⟨f⟩ and ⟨fv⟩ should be exchanged for ⟨v⟩ indicating [v]. For Swedish in particular, Artur Hazelius published in 1870–71 the work Om svensk rättstafning (On Correct Swedish Spelling). It put forth that the guiding principle should be adhering to phonetics. The same sounds, he claimed, should always be indicated with the same letter. This implied that, for example, the letter ⟨g⟩ should no longer be used to indicate both [ɡ] and [j] and that sounds which can be written with several spellings such as [j], [ɕ], and [ɧ] should also be changed.

The same year Hazelius released his work, linguist Johan Erik Rydqvist published "Ljudlagar och skriflagar". This was a sharp reaction against the suggestions of the Spelling Conference, which were based on phonetics. He created the first edition of the Swedish Academy's spelling dictionary of 1874, which made it a counter to reformers. Rydqvist believed that tradition and etymology should be the determiners of spelling. For example, he favored the continuation of double consonants, as in komma, tryggt, kallt, etc. In this, Rydqvist triumphed; double consonants persist in modern Swedish. Furthermore, Rydqvist wanted to keep the letters ⟨c⟩, ⟨q⟩, ⟨x⟩, and ⟨z⟩ and also keep spellings with ⟨f⟩ and ⟨fv⟩ (for example, lif, lefva) instead of ⟨v⟩ (liv, leva). These last spellings with ⟨v⟩ rather than ⟨fv⟩ and ⟨f⟩ became the norm in the spelling reform of 1906.

==== Svenska Akademiens ordlista of 1889 ====
When the sixth edition of SAOL was released in 1889, it accepted kvarn for qvarn, järn for jern, makt for magt, etc., following the views put forth by Academy member Esaias Tegnér Jr. Unlike the five previous, this edition of SAOL was, by royal order, used as the norm for spelling education in schools.

Usage of the letters ⟨v⟩ and ⟨w⟩ was, as long as the Fraktur typeface was used, guided by the typeface. In Fraktur, ⟨w⟩ was used as a rule to indicate the sound [v], except for in loanwords of Latin or Romance origin, when ⟨v⟩ was used. In SAOL 1874–1900, which were not printed in Fraktur, the number of words using ⟨w⟩ was very small, and primarily tied to names (clown, darwinism, schweizeri). In 1900 there were some words with ⟨w⟩, but primarily as an alternate to a Swedish-adapted form (dråback/drawback, intervju/interview, tomahåk/tomahawk, trål/trawl, visky/whisky, vist/whist). The attempt to remove ⟨w⟩ was further evident in the 1923 edition. Since 1950 however, the use of ⟨w⟩ in loanwords has been more acceptable, as the number of loanwords has increased. Since 2006, ⟨w⟩ constitutes an individual letter of the alphabet in SAOL, sorted separately from ⟨v⟩.

=== 1906 spelling reform ===
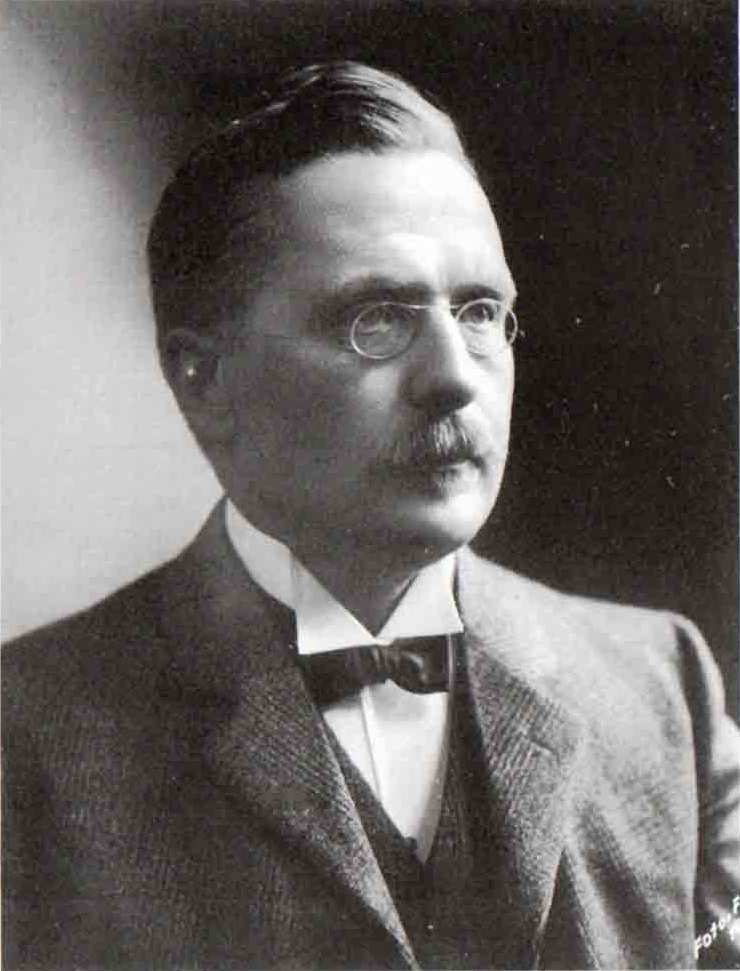
Fridtjuv Berg

In 1880, Sweden's public elementary schoolteachers' association was formed. It aimed to reform spelling on pedagogic grounds. In the liberal administration of 1905, one of the most active members in the teacher's association, Fridtjuv Berg, became education minister. The next year, 1906, he allowed the release of a royal order stating that the spellings in the seventh edition of SAOL would form the guidelines for spelling in primary school and the lower three levels of secondary school. Berg also determined that the [t] sound should be indicated by ⟨t⟩ or ⟨tt⟩ rather than ⟨dt⟩, and that ⟨f⟩, ⟨fv⟩, and ⟨hv⟩ should be changed to ⟨v⟩ when indicating the [v] sound.

=== After 1906 ===
In 1912 it was decided that the new rules should also apply to official writings and publications. There remained some opposition to spelling reform. Among the opposition was the Swedish Academy and the editors of SAOL. In the eighth edition of SAOL (1923), the Swedish Academy listed alternative spellings with ⟨dt⟩ (with the note "SvAk.") for some words officially spelled since 1906 with ⟨t⟩ or ⟨tt⟩. For the first time in the ninth edition in 1950, SAOL without reservation supported the spelling reform. Today, SAOL intends to be "a collection of recommendations in large part based on established practice, and also a desire to adapt additions to the language to the existing Swedish norms for spelling, inflection, and word choice."

== See also ==
- Swedish alphabet
- Orthography
- Written language
