= Theodor Wisén =

Swedish philologist (1835–1892)

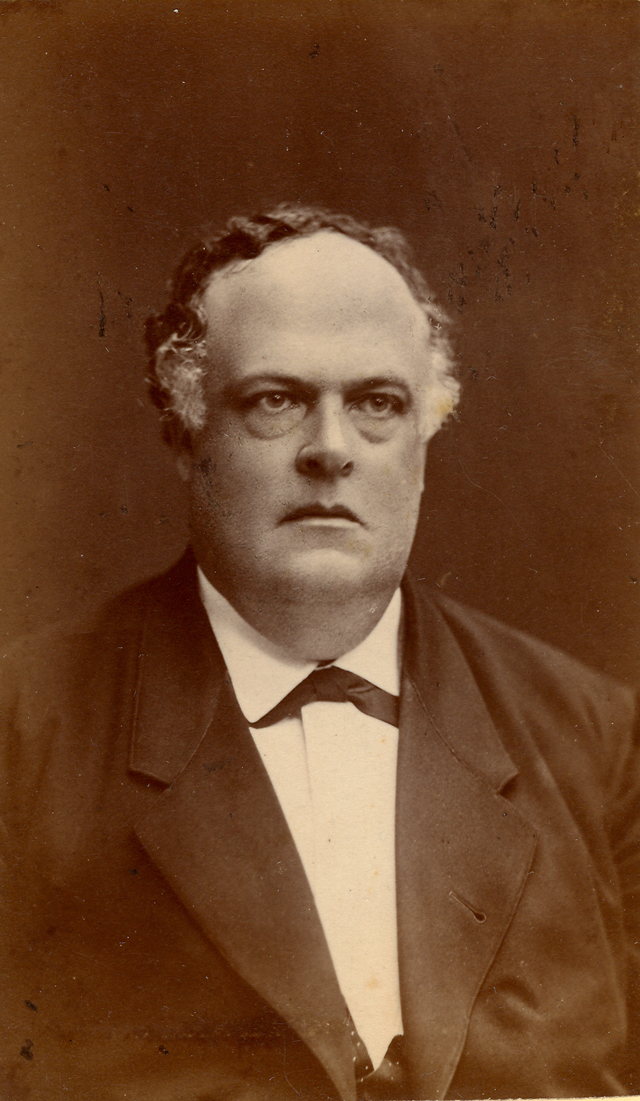
- Born: 31 March 1835; Vissefjärda, Kalmar County, Sweden
- Died: 15 February 1892 (aged 56); Lund, Sweden
- Education: Lund University
- Occupations: Professor of Nordic languages at Lund University; Member of the Swedish Academy
- Awards: Kungliga priset (1874)

Member of the Swedish Academy (Seat No. 5)
- In office 20 December 1878 – 15 February 1892
- Preceded by: Johan Erik Rydqvist
- Succeeded by: Knut Fredrik Söderwall

Theodor Wisén (31 March 1835 – 15 February 1892) was a Swedish philologist of Scandinavian languages.

== Biography ==
Wisén was born in the parish of Vissefjärda in Kalmar County. He studied the classics, especially Greek, before turning to Scandinavian languages. He was appointed professor in Lund in 1865, a position he held until his death. Wisén was reportedly a gifted teacher. His edition of the Homiliu-bok was awarded the prize by the Swedish Academy in 1874, and he published a number of notable books and monographs on Icelandic poetry.

He held the chair of Scandinavian languages at Lund University from 1865, was the rector of the university 1876–1877, its prorector 1877–1885, and again rector 1885–1891. He was elected a member of the Swedish Academy in 1878.

In 1889 he published the second edition of the Swedish Academy's Ordlista, and in the 1880s was appointed editor-in-chief of Academy's dictionary.

== Select bibliography ==
- Homiliu-bok (edited, Lund, 1872)
- Riddara-rimur (published by Samfund til Udgivelse af gammel nordisk Literatur, 1881)
- Carmina norrena (1886, with glossary published 1889)

== Sources ==
- Nils Linder (signed "-r") (1921), "Wisén, Teodor", Nordisk familjebok, Volume 32, 820–822.

Cultural offices
Preceded by Johan Erik Rydqvist	Swedish Academy, Seat No.5; 1878-92	Succeeded by Knut Fredrik Söderwall
