= Axel Kock =

Swedish philologist (1851–1935)

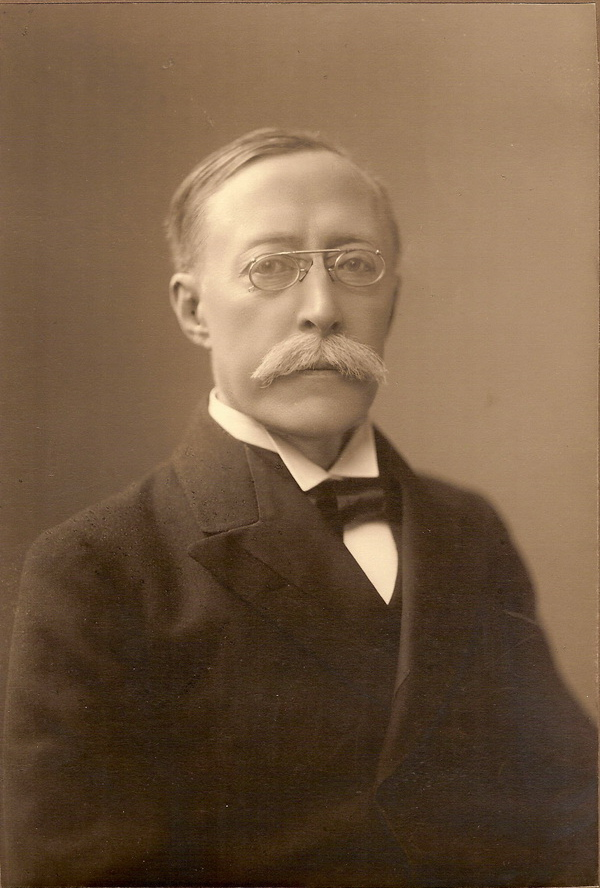
- Born: 2 March 1851; Trelleborg, Sweden
- Died: 18 March 1935 (aged 84); Lund, Sweden
- Education: Lund University; University of Strasbourg
- Occupations: Professor of Nordic languages at Lund University and University of Gothenburg
- Awards: Kungliga priset (1892)

Member of the Swedish Academy (Seat No. 5)
- In office 20 December 1824 – 18 March 1935
- Preceded by: Knut Fredrik Söderwall
- Succeeded by: Bengt Hesselman

Karl Axel Lichnowsky Kock (Trelleborg 2 March 1851 – Lund 18 March 1935) was a Swedish philologist, professor of Scandinavian languages at Lund University 1907-1916.

Kock was born in a merchant family in Trelleborg, but lost both parents at an early age and was raised in the home of the Tegnér family in the university town of Lund, where he became friends with Esaias Tegnér Jr. He studied in Lund and Strassburg, finished both his licentiate and doctorate degrees in 1879 and became a university docent of Scandinavian languages the same year. He was professor of Scandinavian languages at University of Gothenburg 1890-1893 and served as rector of the university in 1891. He resigned from the chair in 1893, possibly because of his bad eyesight, and spent the next several years without an academic position. He accepted the professorship of Scandinavian languages at Lund when it was offered to him in 1907 and retained it until his retirement in 1916. He served as rector of the university 1911-1916.

Kock was a prolific contributor to the journal Arkiv för nordisk filologi already from its start in 1883, and served as its editor-in-chief from 1888 until 1928. After retiring from the editorship, a 575-page festschrift was dedicated to him.

Kock was elected a member of the Royal Swedish Academy of Letters, History and Antiquities in 1906, of the Royal Swedish Academy of Sciences in 1913, and of the Swedish Academy in 1924.

== Notes ==
Cultural offices
Preceded by Knut Fredrik Söderwall	Swedish Academy, Seat No.5; 1924-35	Succeeded by Bengt Hesselman
