= Gunnel Hazelius-Berg =

Swedish writer

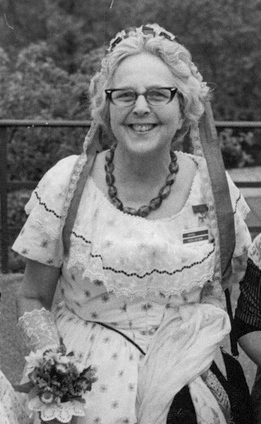
- Gunnel Hazelius-Berg (1968)
- Born: Gunnel Gunnarsdotter Hazelius; 10 May 1905; Stockholm, Sweden
- Died: 7 November 1997 (aged 92); Stockholm, Sweden
- Occupation(s): Museum curator, textile researcher, writer

Gunnel Gunnarsdotter Hazelius-Berg née Hazelius (1905–1997) was a Swedish museum curator, textile researcher and writer. She spent her entire professional career at Stockholm's Nordic Museum. As the director responsible for textiles, over the years she arranged several highly acclaimed exhibitions. Hazelius-Berg took a special interest in traditional Swedish costumes. Together with her daughter-in-law Inga Arnö-Berg, in 1975 she published Folkdräkter och bygdedräkter från hela Sverige which was translated into English as Folk Costumes of Sweden: A Living Tradition.

== Biography ==
Born on 10 May 1905 in Stockholm, Gunnel Gunnarsdotter Hazelius was the daughter of Gunnar Hazelius and his wife Gina née Broman. Her paternal grandfather Artur Hazelius had founded and directed the Nordic Museum and her father had taken it over for a few years until his early death in February 1905. Gunnel was therefore raised by her widowed mother after they settled in her maternal grandparents' home. She did very well in modern languages at the girls' school she attended, perfecting these skills on trips abroad. Her interest in fabrics started early after she became responsible for acquiring them for historic buildings in the Skansen Open-Air Museum. In 1929, she married the ethnologist Gösta Berg, with whom she had two children: Jonas and Ann-Sofi.

In the 1930s, Hazelius-Berg organized a display gallery for the Nordic Museum's rich costume holdings. They were displayed separately on models in showcases protected by dampened lighting, complete with suitable period portraits and colour schemes. In 1953, she arranged a special costume exhibition in Stockholm in connection with the city's 700th anniversary. Models of citizens dressed in traditional attire were presented walking along the city streets. She also organized major exhibitions of tableware textiles (1955) and curtains (1962).

When her husband was appointed director of the Nordic Museum in 1955, Hazelius-Berg managed the cloth holdings of the Skansen Open Air Museum. She held several other positions of note, including chair of the women's cultural society Nya Idun (1962–1969), president of the Swedish branch of Soroptimist International and international president from 1969 to 1971. From 1972 to 1978, she was chair of the National Association of Swedish Handicraft Societies.

Hazelius-Berg published several books on Swedish textiles and costumes. Together with her daughter-in-law Inga Arnö-Berg, in 1975 she published Folkdräkter och bygdedräkter från hela Sverige which was translated into English as Folk Costumes of Sweden: A Living Tradition.

Gunnel Hazelius-Berg died in Stockholm on 7 November 1997.
