= Knut Fredrik Söderwall =

Swedish philologist (1842–1924)

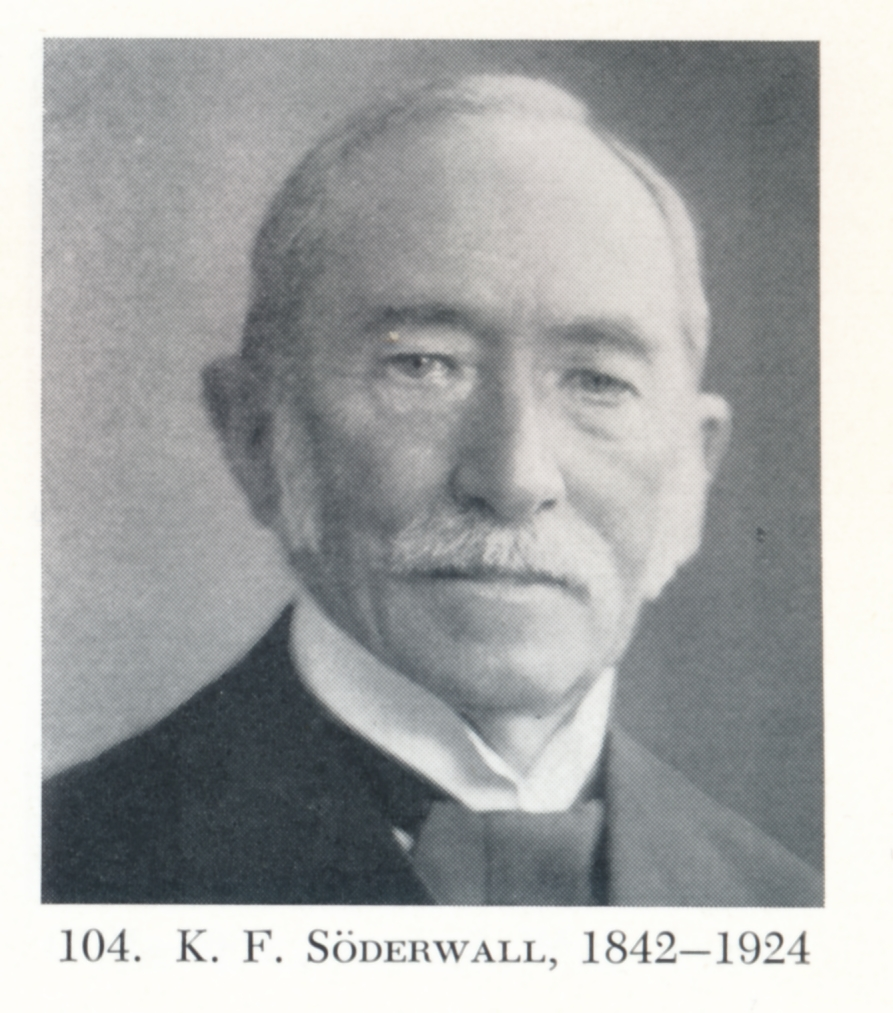
- Born: 1 January 1842; Drängsered parish, Sweden
- Died: 30 May 1924 (aged 82); Lund, Sweden
- Education: Lund University
- Occupations: Professor of Nordic languages at Lund University; Member of the Swedish Academy
- Known for: Ordbok öfver svenska medeltidsspråket
- Awards: Karl Johan prize (1886); Letterstedt prize (1888)

Member of the Swedish Academy (Seat No. 5)
- In office 20 December 1892 – 30 May 1924
- Preceded by: Theodor Wisén
- Succeeded by: Axel Kock

Knut Fredrik Söderwall (1 January 1842 – 30 May 1924) was a Swedish philologist, professor at Lund University, and member of the Swedish Academy.

== Biography ==
Söderwall was born 1842 in Drängsered parish, Halland County. He was the son of the parish priest Per Söderwall and Margareta Johanna von Wachenfeldt. He graduated from the Lund Cathedral School in 1858, and entered Lund University. Söderwall received a Bachelor of Arts in 1863 and a PhD in 1865. He was appointed Docent 1865 and Adjunct professor in 1872. After six years as a stand-in (extraordinarie professor) for Theodor Wisén he became professor in Nordic languages in 1892. The same year he was also elected to Seat No. 5 of the Swedish Academy, also there as successor to Wisén. Söderwall retired as professor in 1907. He died in Lund 30 May 1924.

== Work ==
Söderwall's work mainly concerns Old Swedish. Between 1884 and 1918 he published a dictionary on Old Swedish, Ordbok öfver svenska medeltidsspråket, on behalf of Svenska fornskriftsällskapet. Following the success in the early work on this dictionary he was recruited by the Swedish Academy to work on Svenska Akademiens Ordbok (SAOB). The work on this dictionary had stalled in the 18th century, but was restarted in the 1880s. Söderwall worked on SAOB 1884–1912. Between 1892 and 1912 he was the main editor.

== Memberships in academies and learned societies ==
- 1884 Royal Nordic Society of Antiquaries
- 1892 Swedish Academy
- 1894 Royal Danish Academy of Sciences and Letters (No. 353)
- 1895 Bavarian Academy of Sciences and Humanities
- 1900 Royal Swedish Academy of Sciences (No. 694)
- 1901 Royal Society of Sciences and Letters in Gothenburg
- 1909 Royal Swedish Academy of Letters, History and Antiquities (No. 104)

== Awards ==
- 1868 Svenska Akademiens andra pris from the Swedish Academy
- 1886 Karl Johan prize from the Swedish Academy
- 1888 Letterstedt prize from the Royal Swedish Academy of Sciences

== Bibliography ==
- 1865 Några anmärkningar öfver de svenska kasusformerna under medeltiden
- 1865 Om verbets rektion i fornsvenskan
- 1967 Om främmande ords behandling i fornsvenskan
- 1870 Hufvudepokerna af svenska språkets utbildning
- 1880 Några svenska medeltidsord förklarade
- 1884-1918 Ordbok öfver svenska medeltidsspråket

Cultural offices
Preceded by Theodor Wisén	Swedish Academy, Seat No.5; 1892–1924	Succeeded by Axel Kock
