= Arkiv för nordisk filologi =

- Discipline: Old Norse literature, culture and philology
- Language: Multilingual
- Edited by: Lars-Olof Delsing, Karl G. Johansson

Publication details
- History: 1882–present
- Publisher: Lund University (Sweden)
- Frequency: Annual

Standard abbreviations
- ISO 4: Ark. Nord. Filol.

Indexing
- ISSN: 0066-7668
- OCLC no.: 1514175

Links
- Journal homepage

Arkiv för nordisk filologi is an annual academic journal of Old Norse and older Scandinavian studies, published by Lund University. It was established in 1882 and was the first scholarly periodical entirely devoted to the field.

The creation of such a journal was discussed at the 1881 convention on Nordic philology, and it began publication in Christiania (now Oslo) in 1882 (volume 1, 1882/83) under the editorship of Gustav Storm, as Arkiv för nordisk filologi. It was the first journal devoted entirely to the field of Old Norse studies. With the fifth volume, dated 1889, it began a new series, with subsequent issues bearing two volume numbers, and moved to Lund, where it was edited by Axel Kock, and the spelling was changed to the Swedish för.

The journal is now published with assistance from the Axel Kocks fond för nordisk filologi. It has appeared annually since 1966; prior to that it published quarterly. It publishes an annual review of new publications in Scandinavian language studies, Litteraturkrönika; from 1886 to 1948, there was a complete listing, published annually at first, then every three years.

== Past editors ==
- 1883–1888: Gustav Storm
- 1889–1928: Axel Kock
- 1929–1937: Emil Olson
- 1939–1942: Erik Noreen
- 1944–1967: Karl Gustav Ljunggren
- 1968–1978: Ture Johannisson
- 1979–1987: Sven Benson
- 1988–1996: Bengt Pamp and Christer Platzack
- 1997–2007: Göran Hallberg and Christer Platzack
