= Södermanland Runic Inscription 113 =

Swedish runic inscription

Coordinates: 59.30796°N 16.532893°E

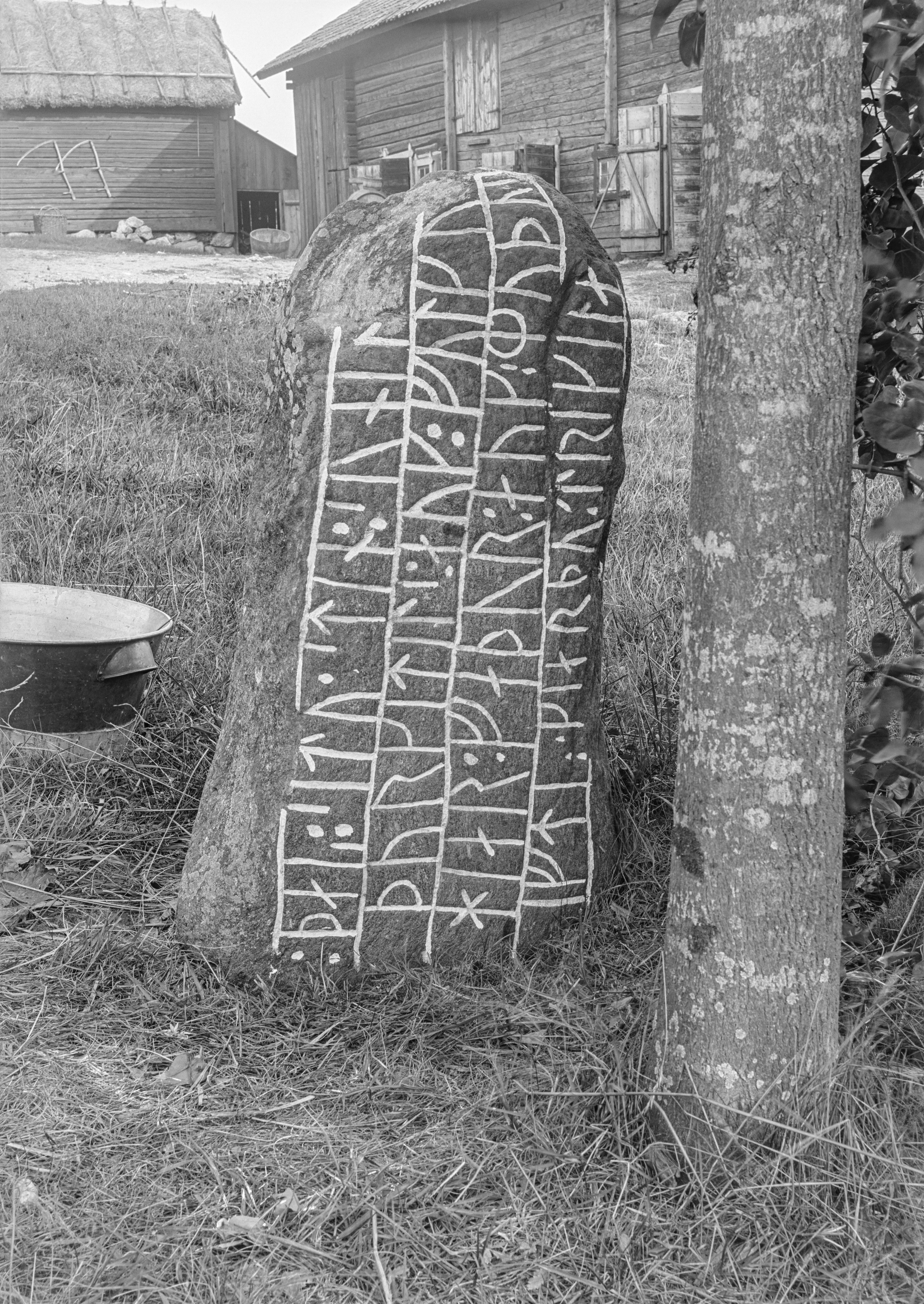
Sö 113, photographed by then-owner Otto von Friesen in the early 20th century

Södermanland Runic Inscription 113 (Swedish: Södermanlands runinskrifter 113; commonly abbreviated to Sö 113) is the Rundata catalogue index for a 0.9 metres (35 in) high, 0.5 metres (20 in) wide granite runestone in Kolunda, Stenkvista Parish, Eskilstuna Municipality, Sweden, within the historic province of Södermanland (hence its name). It was found in 1856 on a hill believed to have once had many other graves and monuments, and is believed to have originally stood atop a burial mound before falling over and being buried. It has since been moved, and now stands next to the runestone known as Sö 112 and a partial runestone (Sö NOR1998;22) discovered in 1997. Its inscription in the Younger Futhark alphabet when translated into English reads "They placed the stone here, the sons of Þorketill and Folka, in memory of father and mother. [They] made [it] valiantly."

== Description ==
Södermanland Runic Inscription 113 (Sö 113) is a granite runestone, which measures 0.9 metres (35 in) high, 0.5 metres (20 in) wide, and 0.35 metres (14 in) thick. It was found in 1856 when a burial mound dating from around the end of the 10th century was dug up during new cultivation of the land. The runestone probably stood on top of the mound before it tipped over and was hidden by soil. Its absence of ornament and the inscription's straight, vertical rune band (line of runes) suggest that it may be the area's oldest runestone. The burial mound connected to Sö 113 was located on a hill which is believed to have originally had many other graves in the form of burial mounds, stone circles, monumental stones and a stone ship, as well as being the original location of Sö 112, which was on the western slope near the road.

Artistically, it is an example of the RAK style, which dates from 980–1015, in the Viking Age. It was one of several runestones owned by runologist Otto von Friesen in the early 20th century. It has since been moved to its current location in Kolunda, Stenkvista Parish, Eskilstuna Municipality, Sweden, in the historic province of Södermanland, where it has been placed alongside Sö 112 and the fragment Sö NOR1998;22 that was discovered in 1997.

== Inscription ==
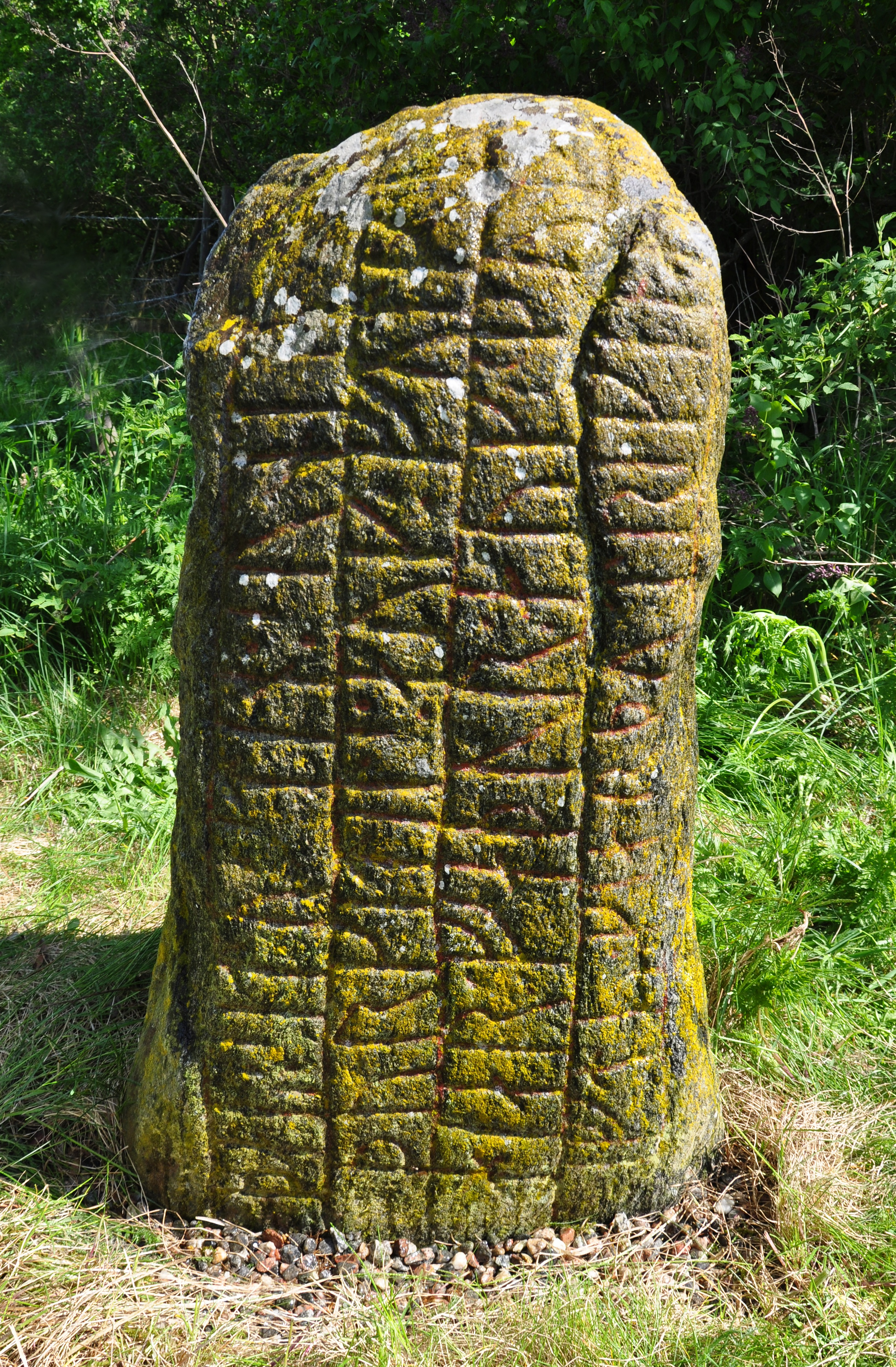
Sö 113, as photographed in 2012

Located on the stone's west-facing side, each rune measures 7–10 centimetres (2.8–3.9 in) in height. The inscription is written in the Younger Futhark alphabet; transliterated into Latin script it reads:

: þaiʀ : situ : stin : suniʀ :
{} Þeir {} settu {} stein, {} synir {}

þurkitils : auk : fulku
Þorketils {} ok {} Folku,

hiar : faþur : auk : muþur
hér, {} fǫður {} ok {} móður

: iftiʀ ' kiarþu ' trikila :
{} eptir. {} Gerðu {} drengila. {}
"They placed the stone here, the sons of Þorketill and Folka, in memory of father and mother. [They] made [it] valiantly."
