= Jonas Hesselman =

Swedish engineer

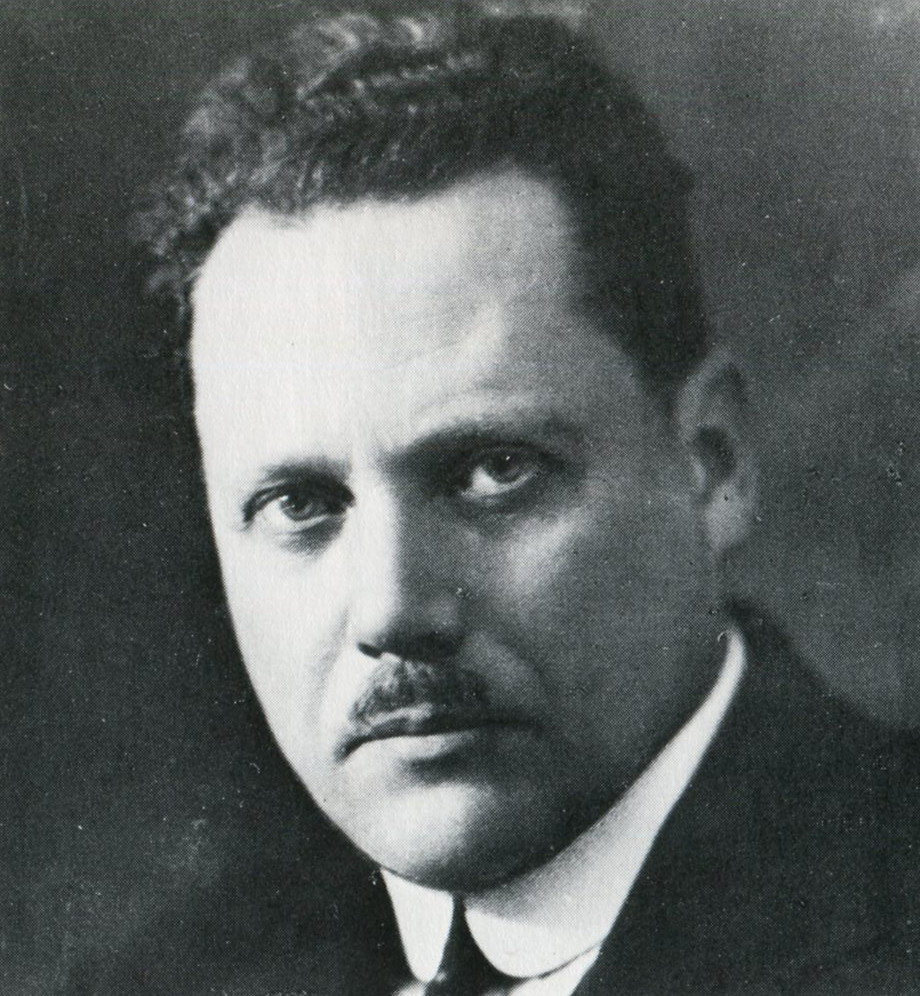
Jonas Hesselman

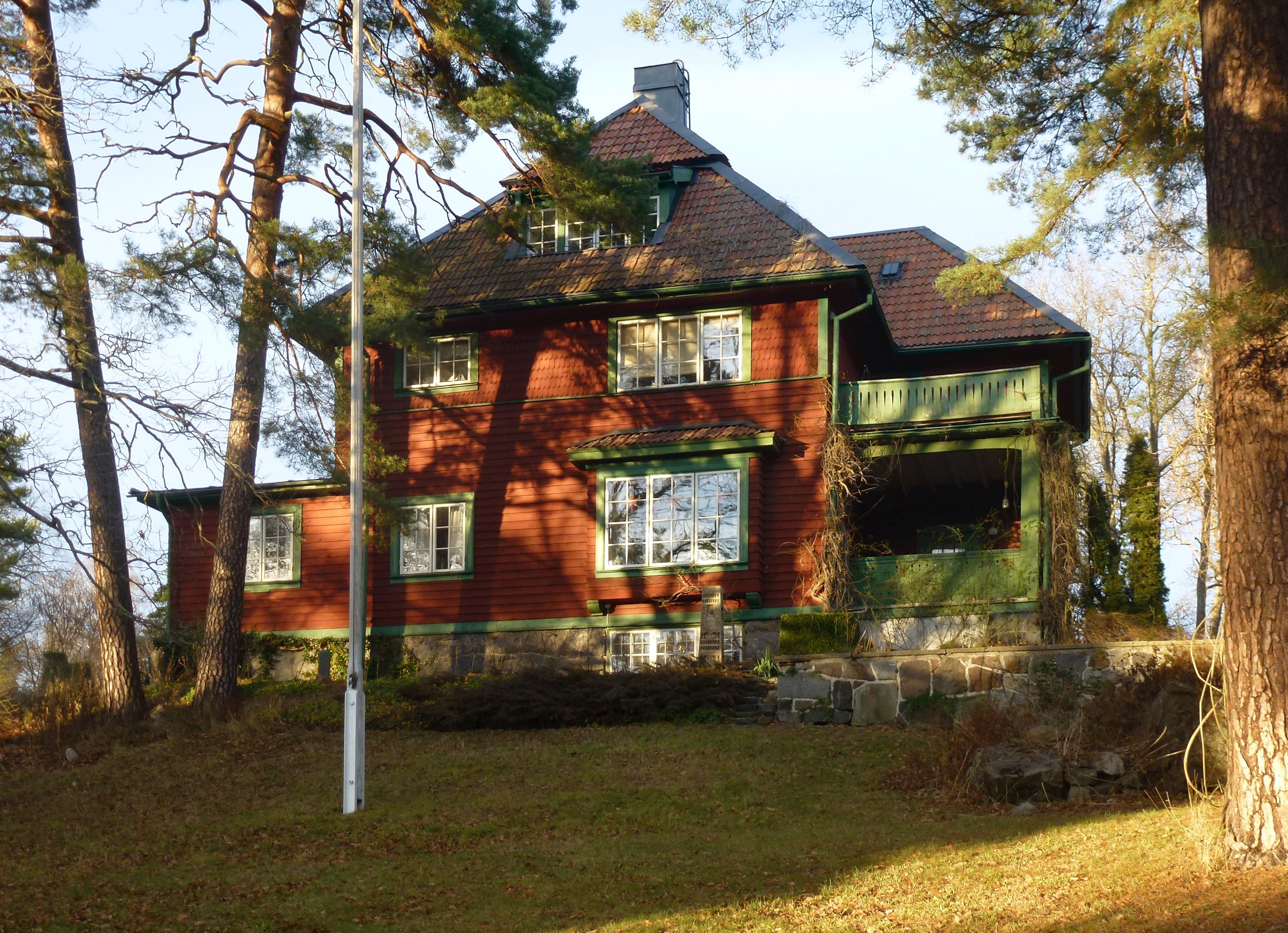
Villa Hesselman at Storängen

Jonas Hesselman (9 April 1877- 20 December 1957) was a Swedish engineer. He built the first spark ignition engine with direct injection of fuel into the cylinder.

== Biography ==
Knut Jonas Elias Hesselman was born at Å församling in Östergötland, Sweden. He was the son of factory owner Bror August Hesselman and Marie Louise Hesselman, née Åberg. He was the brother of professor Henrik Hesselman (1874–1943) and linguist Bengt Hesselman (1875–1952).

Hesselman graduated in 1899 from KTH Royal Institute of Technology, Department of Mechanics. He worked from 1899 to 1916 for AB Diesel Engines (later Atlas Diesel, now Atlas Copco) in Sickla in Nacka just outside Stockholm, from 1901 as Head of Construction. Here he also developed Rudolf Diesel's engine further and won international recognition as an authority on diesel engines. In 1916 he opened his own factory and in 1925 presented the Hesselman engine, a hybrid between an Otto engine and diesel engine.

Jonas Hesselman also designed electrical vehicle components, among others, the motor that became the basis for Hesselman Elhydraulik, now Haldex AB. In 1970, Hesselman Elhydraulik developed the hydraulic power unit that still serves as the prototype for the existing lifts for trucks.

Jonas Hesselman was a resident of "Villa Hesselman" at Storängen outside Stockholm. The villa was designed in 1906 by architect Albin Brag (1878-1937). He lived here until his death in 1957.

== See also ==
- Diesel engine

== Other sources ==
- Lindh, Björn-Eric (1992). Scania fordonshistoria 1891-1991 (in Swedish). Streiffert. ISBN 91-7886-074-1. (Translated title: Vehicle history of Scania 1891-1991)
- Lundeberg, Erik (1931) Hesselmanmotorn som bilmotor (Stockholm: Dædalus)
