= Bengt Hesselman =

Swedish linguist (1875–1952)

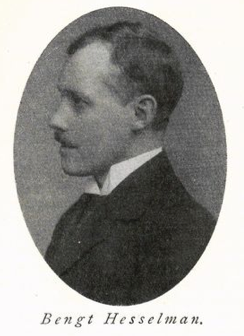
- Born: 21 December 1875; Stockholm, Sweden or Å, Sweden
- Died: 6 April 1952 (aged 76); Uppsala, Sweden

Academic background
- Education: Uppsala University
- Thesis: Stafvelseförlängning och vokalkvalitet i östsvenska dialekter (1902)

Academic work
- Discipline: Linguist
- Sub-discipline: Scandinavian languages
- Institutions: Uppsala University

Member of the Swedish Academy (Seat No. 5)
- In office 20 December 1835 – 6 April 1952
- Preceded by: Axel Kock
- Succeeded by: Henry Olsson

Bengt Ivar Hesselman (21 December 1875 – 6 April 1952) was a Swedish linguist and philologist, specialising in Scandinavian languages.

== Early life ==
Hesselman was born either in Stockholm or in Å, Östergötland, on 21 December 1875. His parents were the factory owner Bror August Hesselman and Marie Louise Hesselman, née Åberg. He had several brothers, including the botanist Henrik Hesselman and the civil engineer Jonas Hesselman.

== Education and academic career ==
He passed his maturity examination (mogenhetsexamen) in Stockholm in 1893 and became a student at Uppsala University in the same year. In 1902 he defended his doctoral thesis on some phonological features of East Swedish dialects (Östsvenska mål, spoken in parts of Finland and historically in parts of Estonia). He continued his studies on Swedish regional dialects, and published several books on dialect boundaries in Swedish, and on the historical development of Swedish vowel sounds.

In the 1910s he started publishing research on place names and names of plants, and he broadened his studies to involve Scandinavian languages other than Swedish. He was appointed Professor of Scandinavian languages at the University of Gothenburg in 1914, but only stayed there until 1919 when he became Professor of Scandinavian languages at Uppsala University.

He was elected a member of the Royal Swedish Academy of Sciences in 1931, of the Royal Swedish Academy of Letters, History and Antiquities in 1933, and of the Swedish Academy in 1935.

His scholarly production includes works on phonological history, the emergence of Standard Swedish, and a large work on Scandinavian language history where the first part, Omljud och brytning i de nordiska språken was published in 1945, and later parts in 1948, 1952 and posthumously in 1953.

== Personal life ==
Hesselman married Märta Charlotta von Post in 1906. He died in Uppsala on 6 April 1952, and is buried at Uppsala Old Cemetery.

Cultural offices
Preceded by Axel Kock	Swedish Academy, Seat No.5; 1935–1952	Succeeded by Henry Olsson
