= Henrik Hesselman =

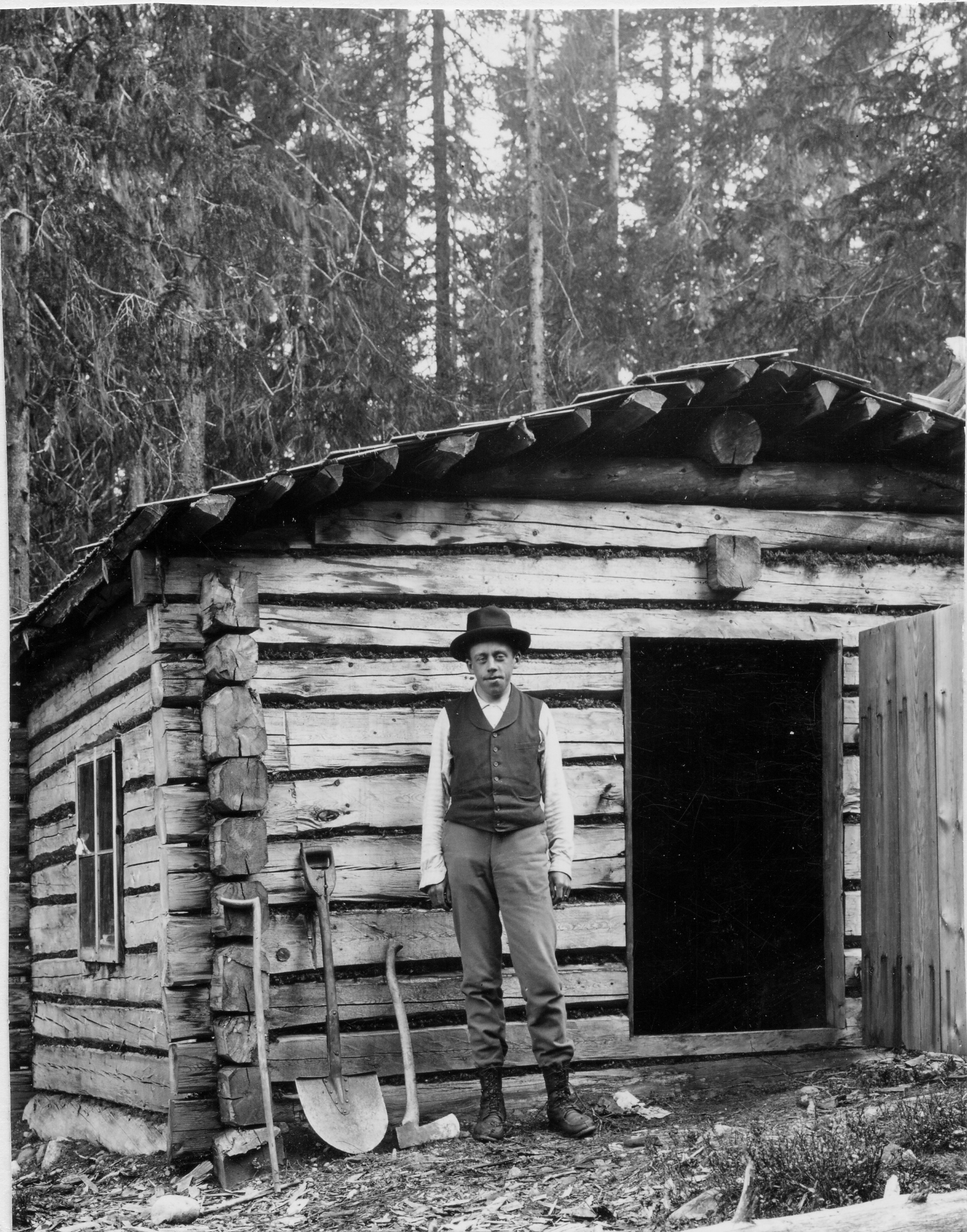
Assistant Lic. (then professor) Henrik Hesselman outside the hunter's hut that was built by hunter Fredenberg in 189?.

Henrik Hesselman (28 January 1874 – 11 July 1943) was a Swedish professor, foresters, and botanist.

== Biography ==
Oskar August Henrik Vilhelm Hesselman was born in Stockholm, Sweden. His parents were factory owner Bror August Hesselman and Marie Louise Hesselman, née Åberg. He was the brother of civil engineer Jonas Hesselman (1877–1957) and linguist Bengt Hesselman(1875–1952).

In 1898, he participated as an assistant botanist in the expedition on the ship Antarctic led by Arctic explorer Alfred Gabriel Nathorst (1850–1921) to Bear Island, Svalbard and Kong Karls Land.

Hesselman earned his Ph.D. at Uppsala University and was an associate professor of botany at Stockholm University. From 1912, he was a professor for forest biology at the Swedish Forest Research Institute (Statens skogsförsöksanstalt), today the Department of Forest Research at the Swedish University of Agricultural Sciences at Uppsala, which he presided from 1925 to 1939. Hesselman was secretary at the Second International Agrogeological Conference in Stockholm in 1910, He was elected a member of the Royal Swedish Academy of Agriculture in 1913, and of the Royal Swedish Academy of Sciences in 1928.
