= Svenska Akademiens ordbok =

Dictionary of the Swedish language

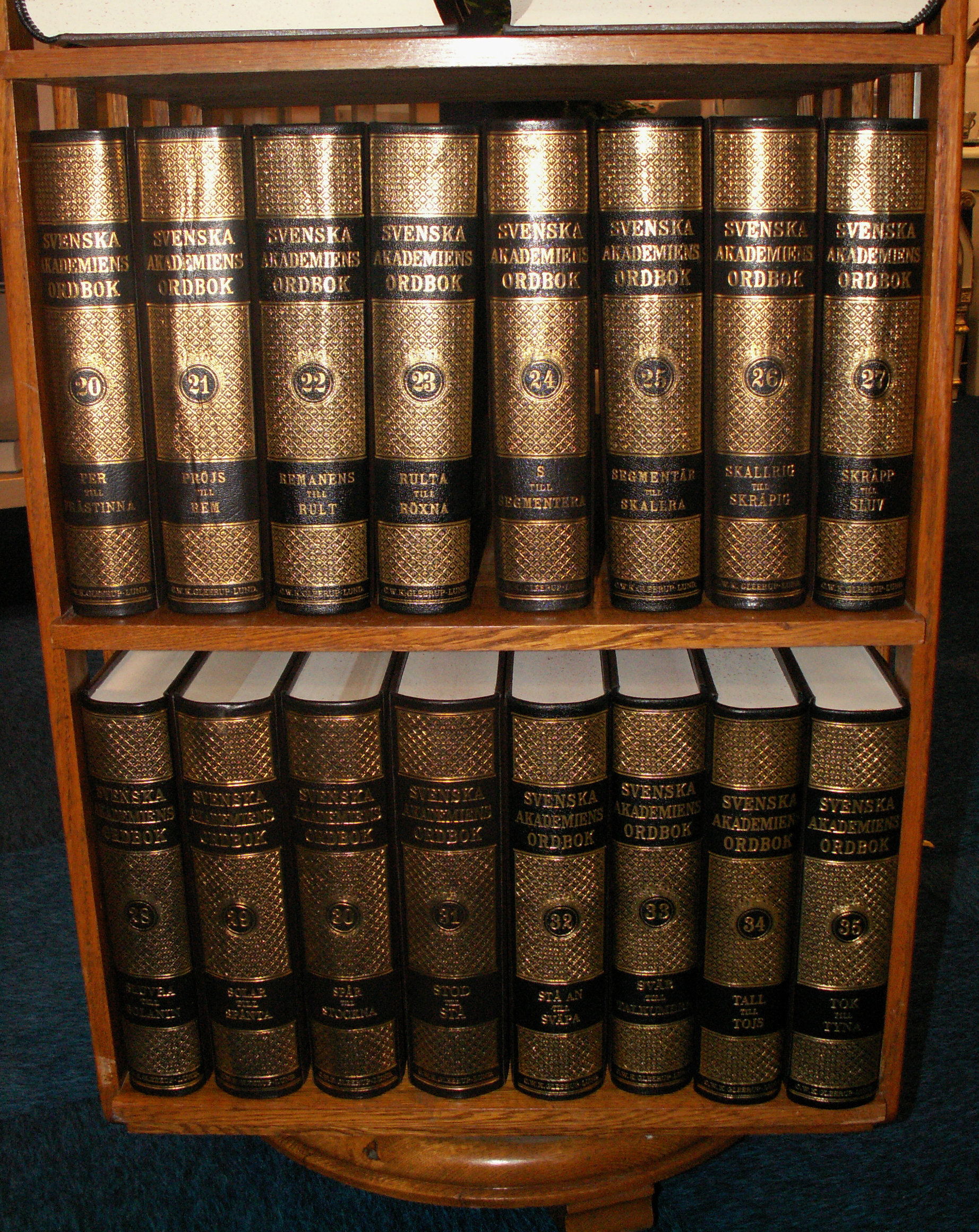
- Volumes of Svenska Akademiens ordbok
- Edited by: Theodor Wisén 1884; Knut Fredrik Söderwall 1892; Esaias Tegnér Jr. 1913; Ebbe Tuneld 1920; Pelle Holm 1942; Sven Ekbo 1957; Anders Sundqvist 1978; Hans Jonsson 1979; Lars Svensson 1993; Anki Mattisson 1999; Marianne Gellwar 2015; Christian Mattsson 2015
- Original title: Ordbok över svenska språket utgiven av Svenska Akademien
- Country: Sweden
- Language: Swedish
- Publisher: Swedish Academy
- Published: 1893–2023
- No. of books: 39
- OCLC: 1063333686
- Website: www.saob.se

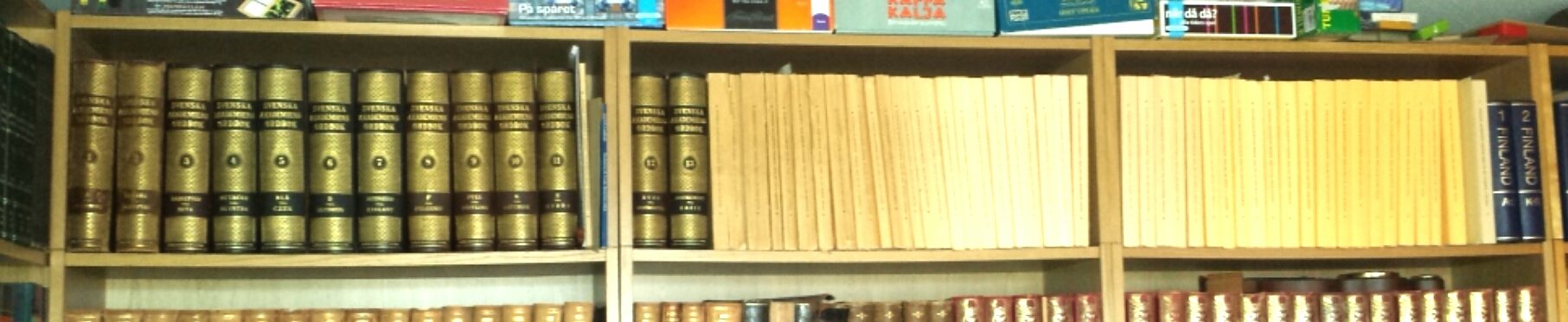
A complete set of Svenska Akademiens ordbok, as of late 2014. The majority of the volumes remain unbound in this set.

Svenska Akademiens ordbok (Swedish: [ˈsvɛ̂nːska akadɛˈmiːns ˈûːɖˌbuːk]), abbreviated SAOB, is a historical dictionary of the Swedish language published by the Swedish Academy. It is the Swedish counterpart of the Oxford English Dictionary (OED) or the Deutsches Wörterbuch (DWB).

Work on the dictionary started in 1787. The first edition was published in 39 volumes between 1898 and 2023, in Swedish alphabetical order, and contains over 500,000 entries. Updating of the earlier volumes, A to R, is expected to continue until 2030. The last volume was printed in about 500 copies. The 39 volumes total 33,111 pages. The searchable web version has been available since 1997. Citations date back to 1521.

== Volumes ==
Volume	Words	Publication year
1	A–ANLÖPNING	1898
2	ANMANA–BARHUFVAD	1903
3	BARHUFVUD–BETA	1906
4	BETACKA–BLYSTRA	1916
5	BLÅ–CZEK	1925
6	D–DISTINGERA	1925
7	DISTINGERAD–EXULANT	1925
8	F–FULGURIT	1926
9	FULL–FÖTTLING	1928
10	G–GÖTTNISK	1929
11	H–HYDDA	1932
12	HYDE–INSTRUKTÖR	1933
13	INSTRUMENT–KAZIK	1935
14	KED–KRALLA	1937
15	KRAM–LEUTERERA	1939
16	LEV–MARKGÄLD	1942
17	MARKIS–MÖTE	1945
18	N–OKÖRD	1949
19	OL–PEPTON	1952
20	PER–PRÄSTINNA	1954
21	PRÖJS–REM	1957
22	REMANENS–RULT	1959
23	RULTA–RÖXNA	1962
24	S–SEGMENTERA	1965
25	SEGMENTÄR–SKALLRA	1969
26	SKALLRIG–SKRÄPIG	1973
27	SKRÄPP–SLUV	1977
28	SLUVRA–SOLANIN	1981
29	SOLAR–SPÅNTA	1985
30	SPÅR–STOCKNA	1989
31	STOD–STÅ	1993
32	STÅ AN–SVÄPA	1999
33	SVÄR–TALKUMERA	2002
34	TALL–TOJS	2005
35	TOK–TYNA	2009
36	TYNGA–UTSUDDA	2012
37	UTSUG–VRETA	2017
38	VRETT–ÅVÄXT	2021
39	Ä–ÖXLA	2023

== See also ==
- Svenska Akademiens ordlista — the Swedish Academy's single-volume spelling dictionary
