= Otto von Friesen =

Swedish linguist

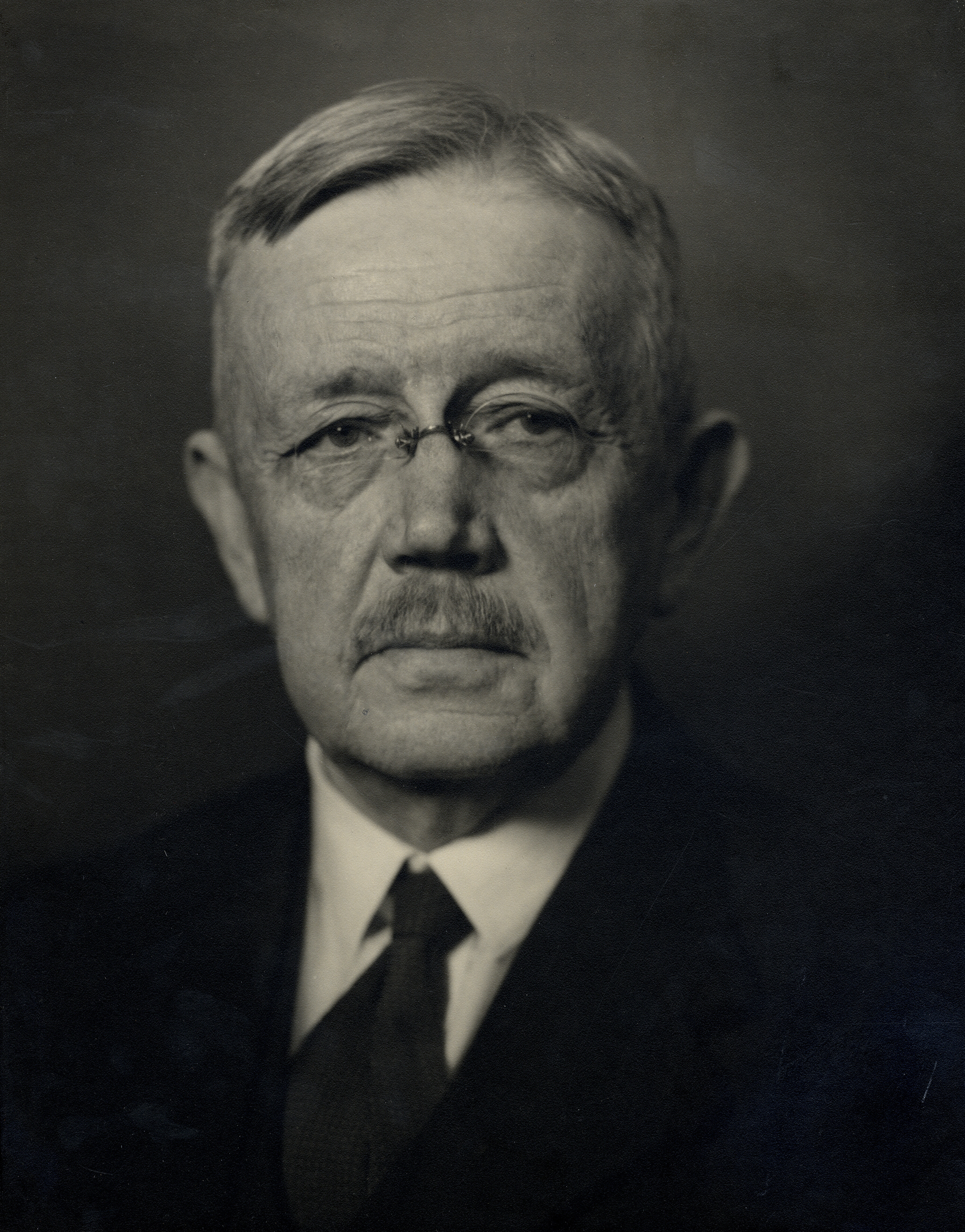
Professor Otto von Friesen (1870—1942) photograhed by Gunnar Sundgren. Date is probably 1940.

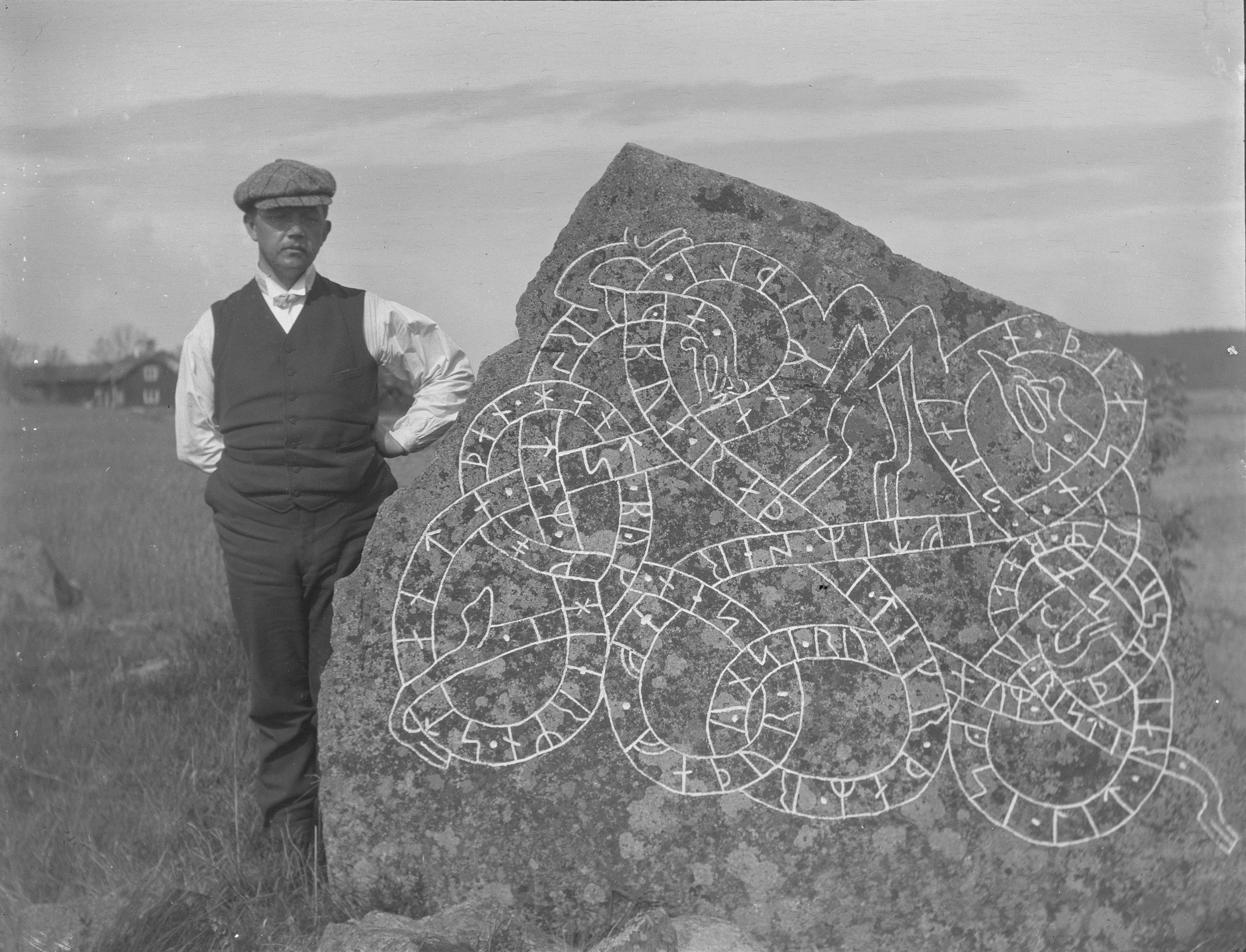
Otto von Friesen and Upplands runestone 729, by Oscar Juel

Otto von Friesen (11 May 1870 – 10 September 1942) was a Swedish linguist, runologist and professor of the Swedish language at Uppsala University from 1906 to 1935. He was also a member of the Swedish Academy from 1929 to 1942, serving in Chair 9.

Friesen began teaching in Nordic Languages at Uppsala University in 1897 and finished his dissertation there in 1898. He became a professor of Swedish in 1906.

Published works include Om de germanska mediageminatorna (1897), Till den nordiska språkhistorien (1901 and 1906), as well as Om runskriftens härkomst (1904–06), Vår äldsta handskrift på fornsvänska (1906) and "Kylverstenen" (in Antiqv. tidskrift, vol. XVIII).

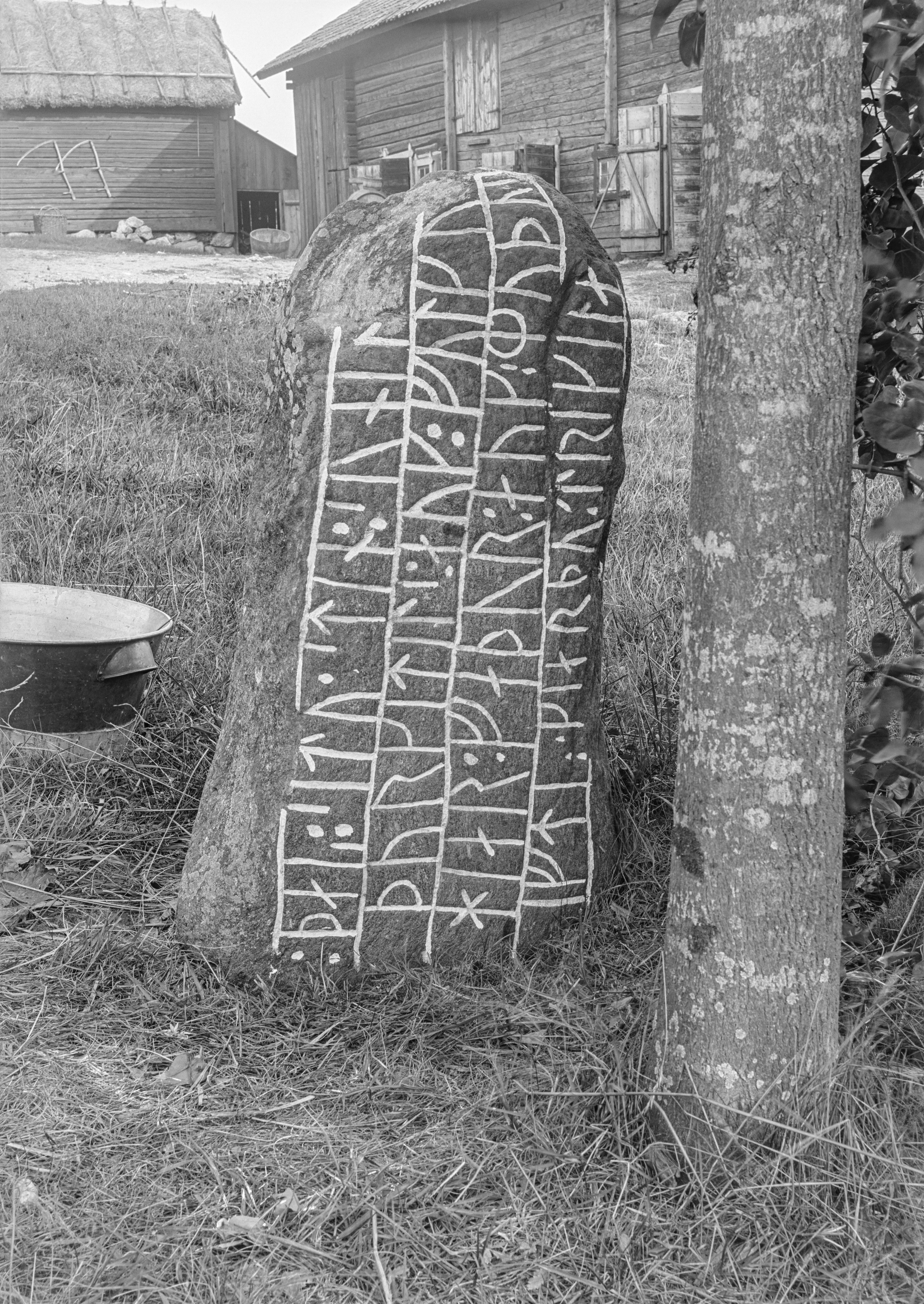
Photograph by Friesen of runestone Sö 113, one of several owned and photographed by him.

Cultural offices
Preceded by Esaias Tegnér Jr.	Swedish Academy, Seat No 9; 1929–42	Succeeded by Einar Löfstedt
