= Svenska Akademiens ordlista =

Swedish dictionary

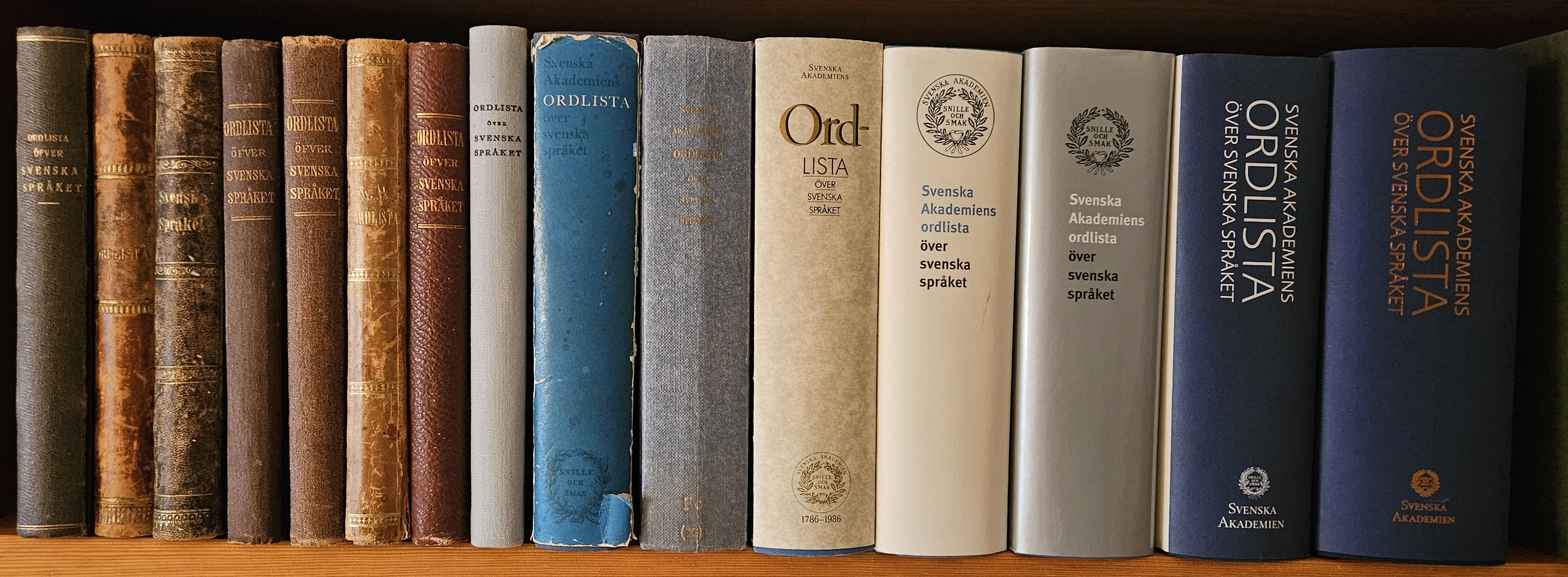
The 15 editions of Svenska Akademiens ordlista

Svenska Akademiens ordlista (Swedish: [ˈsvɛ̂nːska akadɛˈmiːns ˈûːɖˌlɪsːta], "Word list of the Swedish Academy"), abbreviated SAOL, is a dictionary published every few years by the Swedish Academy. It is a single volume that is considered the final arbiter of Swedish spelling. Traditionally it carries the motto of the Swedish Academy, Snille och smak ("Talent and Taste"), on its blue cloth cover.

SAOL has always been primarily a spelling dictionary, but the latest editions also contain (brief) definitions for the majority of words.

Whenever a new edition comes out lively discussions about new and changed entries erupt around the country. In some instances the Academy has been ahead of its times and has later had to change entries back to older spellings. Jos – juice is probably the most well-known instance. In 2026, the fifteenth edition (containing 127,600 entries) was published.

== History ==
The history of SAOL is the history of orthography of the Swedish language. While Swedish spelling was an entirely personal business in the Catholic Middle Ages, its gradual standardization (known as Modern Swedish) started in 1526 with the translation of the New testament of the Bible (Gustav Vasa Bible), as part of the Lutheran reformation. The edition was revised in 1703, known as the Swedish Bible of Carolus XII. The Swedish Academy was founded in 1786 with the task of caring for Swedish literature and language, including the publication of a grand dictionary. Spelling evolved slowly in the 18th century and was largely based on etymology: for instance, because of its historic relationship to English heart and German Herz, hjärta was spelled hjerta in Swedish even though it's pronounced [ˈjæ̂ʈːa]; the word for "woman" (now kvinna) was spelled qvinna, similar to English queen; the question words hvad, hvar, hvilken had a silent H, like English what, where, which still have in most accents. In 1801 the Academy published an official orthography (Carl Gustaf af Leopold, Afhandling om svenska stafsättet, 266 pages). A shorter version for schools was published by Carl Jonas Love Almqvist, Svensk Rättstafnings-Lära in 1829.

Already in the 1750s, voices had been raised to adapt spelling to pronunciation, but this didn't resonate with the conservatively minded Academy. Public schools were made mandatory in Sweden by law in 1842 and the influence of school teachers increased, as did the pressure to reform Swedish spelling. The most radical reformists wanted to do away with all silent letters and change the remaining ones to a smaller subset of the alphabet. A similar reform movement for Danish, which at this time was the written language also in Norway, was led by Rasmus Rask (1787–1832) and his follower Niels Matthias Petersen (1791–1862). In 1869 a pan-Scandinavian orthography congress (Nordiska rättstavningsmötet) gathered in Stockholm. Secretary for the Swedish section was Artur Hazelius, who in 1871 published the proceedings of the conference. The Academy was not pleased, and as a countermeasure Johan Erik Rydqvist (1800–1877) published the first edition of SAOL in 1874, based on the orthography in Leopold's work of 1801. A second edition followed in the same year and new ones in 1875, 1880 and the 5th edition in 1883, without much change.

To further reform, a Swedish orthographic society (Svenska rättstavningssällskapet) was formed on November 28, 1885, chaired by linguist Adolf Noreen (1854–1925), and published a journal Nystavaren. Tidskrift för rättskrivningsfrågor (4 volumes, 1886–1898, edited by Otto Hoppe). There was continued opposition, not least from Academy member Esaias Tegnér Jr. (1843–1928). However, many of the proposed changes, albeit far from all, were introduced in the 6th edition of SAOL in 1889. Many words spelled with E were changed to Ä (elf → älf, hjerta → hjärta, jern → järn), and under Q it was stated that Q may at will be replaced with K. By a government resolution on November 16, 1889, the spelling used in this edition of SAOL was to be used for teaching in Swedish high schools (allmänna läroverk) and teacher colleges (seminarier). This was a direct blow against the society's own dictionary published in 1886, and reform movement lost much of its momentum. In the 7th edition of SAOL in 1900, many of the old optional forms with Q were dropped.

In 1898, school teachers started to sign mass petitions for further reform. In 1903, the association of Swedish public school teachers (Sveriges allmänna folkskollärarförening) requested a government ruling that it "would no longer be considered wrong" (ej måtte betraktas som fel) to write TT instead of DT and V instead of F, FV and HV. More associations joined this petition in 1905. A government proposal to this effect was signed on April 7, 1906, by education minister Fridtjuv Berg (1851–1916), and put before the parliament of 1907. A protest against the reform signed by 40,000 concerned citizens was handed to the government in 1908, but had no effect. The liberal Fridtjuv Berg was a former school teacher and one of the founding members of the orthographic society.

The reform of 1906 was the most radical in the history of Swedish orthography. Spelling with dt, fv and hv is now commonly known as "old spelling" (gammalstavning). The new spelling was adopted in schools starting in 1907. It was used from the first edition of Selma Lagerlöf's geography textbook Nils Holgerssons underbara resa genom Sverige (1906, The Wonderful Adventures of Nils). The proceedings of the Swedish parliament adopted the new spelling from the year 1913. After endless discussions through the 19th century, a new Swedish Bible translation was finally adopted in 1917, using the new spelling. Sweden's largest printed encyclopedia of all times, the 2nd edition of Nordisk familjebok was started in 1904 and used the old spelling through all 38 volumes until 1926. The Academy introduced the new spelling in the 8th edition of SAOL in 1923. The 9th edition appeared in 1950.

In the 10th edition in 1973, the Academy tried to launch new alternative spellings such as jos ("juice"), without attracting any significant number of followers. The 11th edition of SAOL appeared in 1986 and the 12th edition in 1998. While the letter Q in the 8th edition only listed the letter Q itself, the 11th edition also listed quantum satis, quenell, quilt and quisling.

From the beginning of times, W had in Swedish been considered as a mere decoration of V. In Swedish typography, blackletter (fraktur) used W where antiqua used V. With orthographic standardization and spelling reform, W was abandoned except for some proper names and a few loan words such as whisky, wobbler (also spelled visky and vobbler), whist and wienerbröd. In Swedish dictionaries and telephone books, V and W have been sorted as one letter. In the 13th edition of SAOL in 2006, the Academy broke with this tradition, listing W as a letter of its own. This change was sparked by a new influx of loan words such as webb ("World Wide Web").

== See also ==
- Svenska Akademiens ordbok
