= Artur Hazelius =

Swedish folkorist and museum founder (1833–1901)

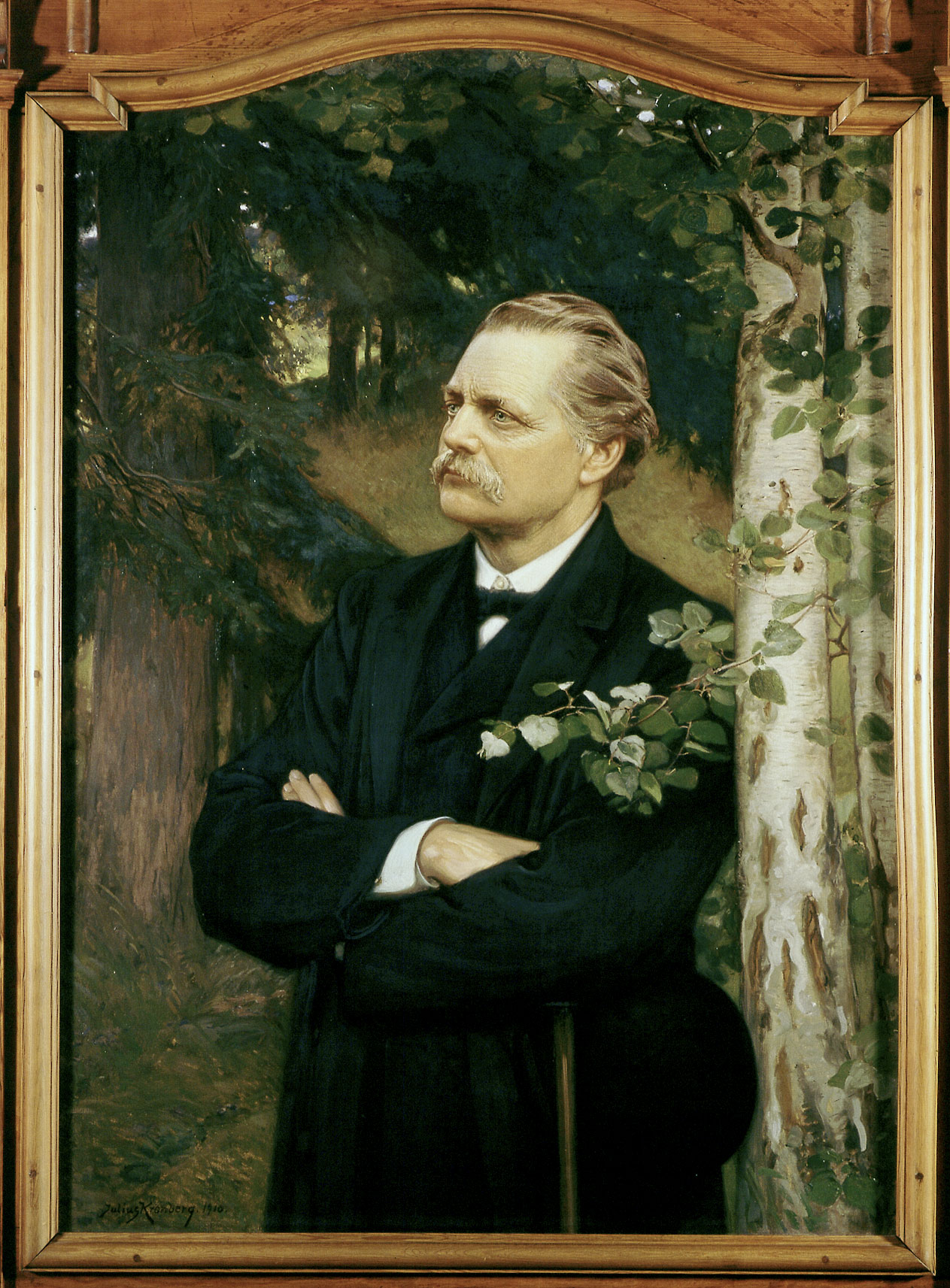
- Born: 30 November 1833; Stockholm, Sweden
- Died: 27 May 1901 (aged 67)
- Occupations: teacher; scholar; folklorist; museum director
- Known for: founder of the Nordic Museum and the Skansen open-air museum

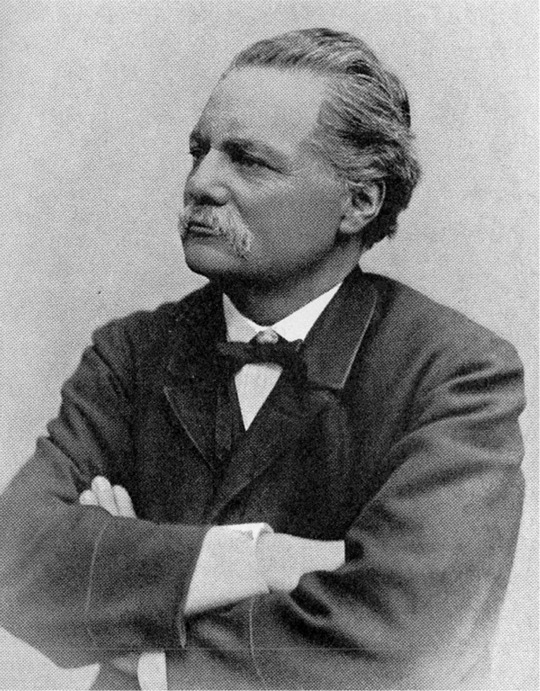
Artur Hazelius. From Emil Hildebrand, Sveriges historia intill tjugonde seklet (1910)

Artur Immanuel Hazelius (30 November 1833 – 27 May 1901) was a Swedish teacher, scholar, folklorist and museum director. He was the founder of both the Nordic Museum (Nordiska museet) and the Skansen open-air museum in Stockholm.

== Background ==
Hazelius was born in Stockholm, Sweden as the son of Johan August Hazelius (1797–1871), a Swedish Army officer (with terminal rank of major general), politician and publicist. He entered Uppsala University in 1854, and received his Ph.D. degree in 1860, after which he worked as a teacher, as well as participating in several school-book and language reform projects.

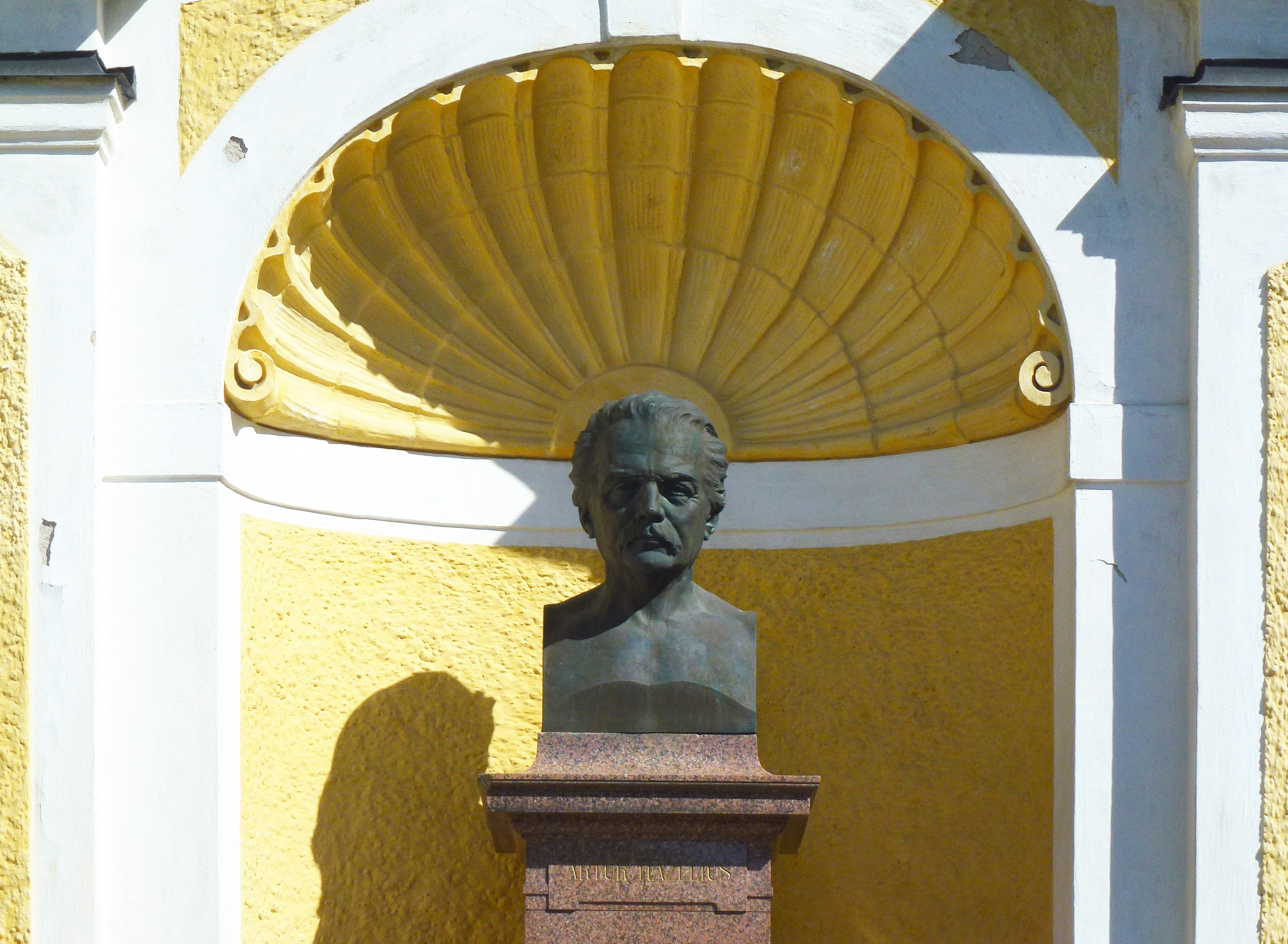
Bust of Artur Hazelius at Skansen

In 1869 Hazelius was the secretary of the Swedish section at the Scandinavian orthographic congress in Stockholm (det nordiska rättstavningsmötet), and published its proceedings in 1871. The radical reforms in Swedish spelling proposed there sparked opposition from the Swedish Academy. This gave Johan Erik Rydqvist (1800–1877) the energy to publish Svenska Akademiens ordlista (SAOL), the very conservative first edition of the Academy's one-volume spelling dictionary in 1874. However, many of the proposals from the congress were introduced in the sixth edition of the same dictionary in 1889 (e–ä, qv–kv) and the rest (dt, fv, hv) in a spelling reform for Swedish schools, introduced in 1906 by the minister of education Fridtjuv Berg (1851–1916). Berg acknowledged that Hazelius had laid the foundation for all following spelling reforms.

== Career ==
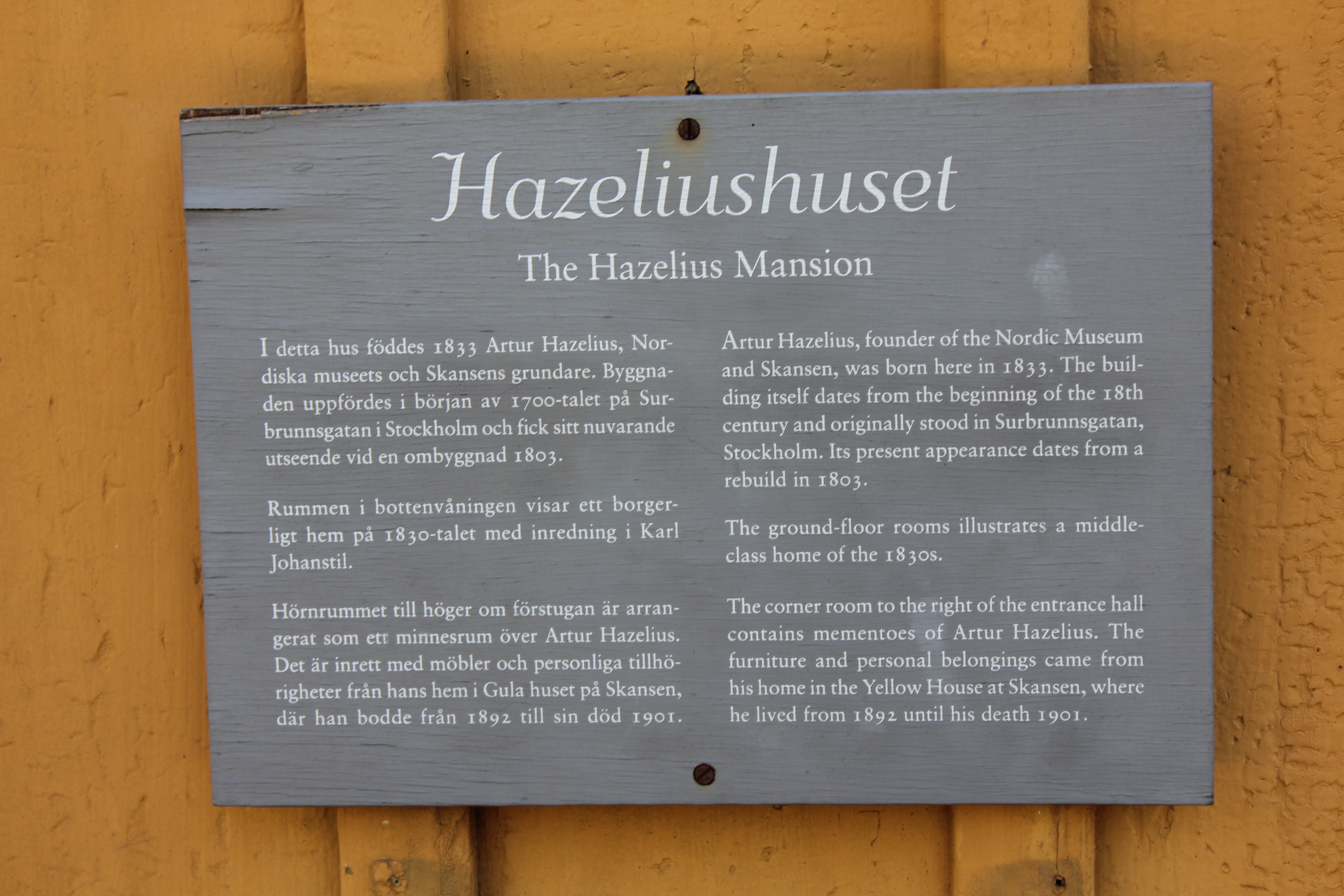
Plaque at Skansen

During travels in the country, Hazelius noticed how Swedish folk culture, including architecture and other aspects of the material culture, was eroding under the influence of industrialization, migration and other processes of modernity, and in 1872 he decided to establish a museum for Swedish ethnography, originally (1873) called the Scandinavian ethnographic collection (Skandinavisk-etnografiska samlingen), from 1880 the Nordic Museum (Nordiska Museum, now Nordiska museet). In 1891 he established the open-air museum Skansen, which became the model for other open-air museums in Northern Europe. He got the idea after a visit to the world's first open-air museum, Norsk Folkemuseum, established near Oslo in 1881.

Hazelius was close friends with Swedish pathologist Axel Key, with whom he shared a number of common interests and helped found the museum. The two "won special acknowledgment at the World Exhibition in Paris 1878 where the museum was acclaimed worldwide." Key also served as chair of the museum's board for several years.

For the Nordic museum, Hazelius bought or managed to get donations of objects – furniture, clothes, toys, etc. – from all over Sweden and the other Nordic countries; he was mainly interested in peasant culture but his successors increasingly started to collect objects reflecting bourgeois and urban lifestyles as well. For Skansen he collected entire buildings and farms.

Although the project did not initially get the government funding he had hoped, Hazelius received widespread support and donations, and by 1898 the Society for the promotion of the Nordic Museum (Samfundet för Nordiska Museets främjande) had 4,525 members. The Riksdag allocated some money for the museums in 1891 and doubled the amount in 1900, the year before his death.

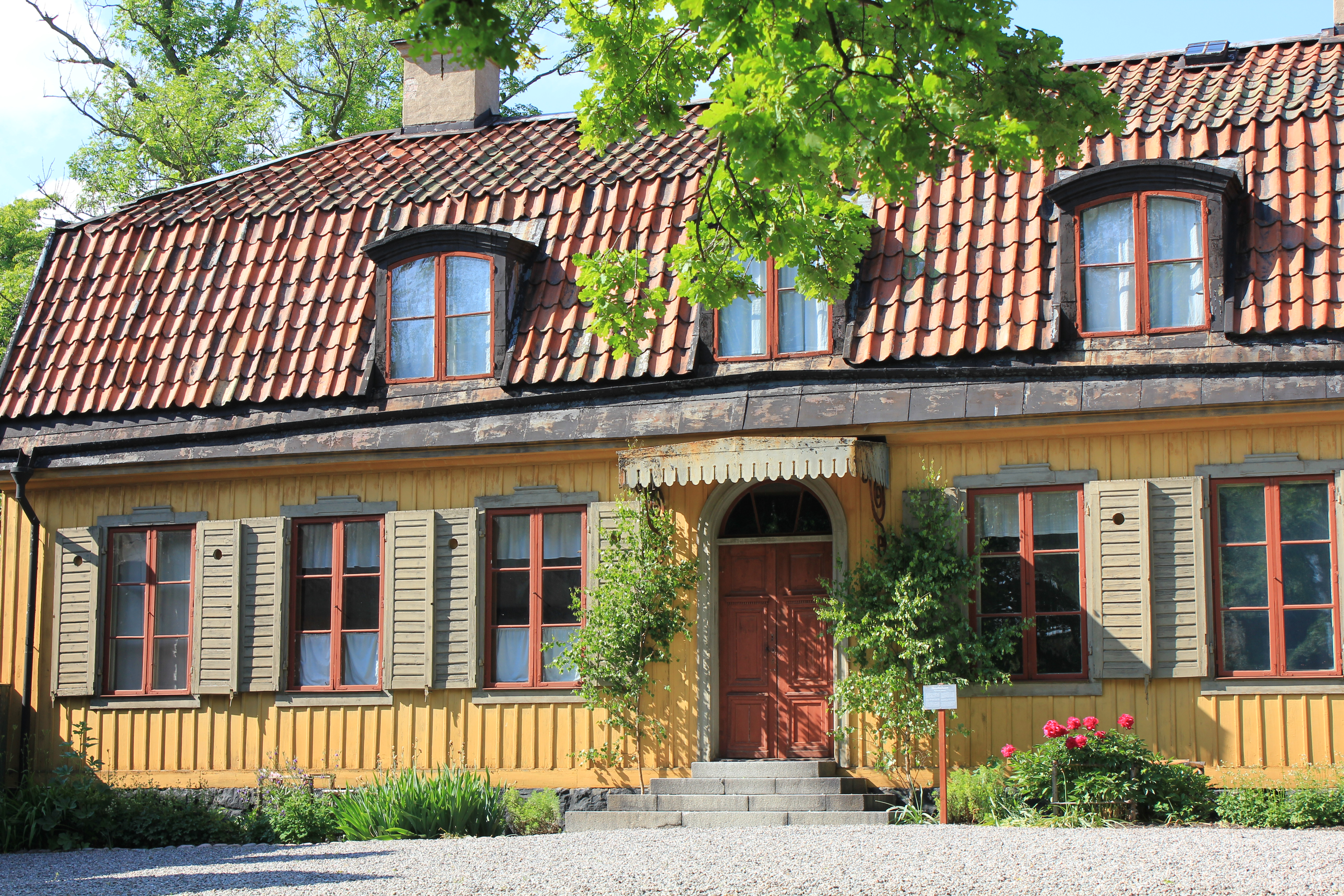
Hazeliushuset at Skansen

== Personal life ==
Hazelius was married to Sofia Elisabeth Grafström (1839–1874), daughter of Anders Abraham Grafström, a historian, priest and member of the Swedish Academy

During the last few years of his life, Hazelius lived at Hazeliushuset, one of the old buildings on Skansen. He died on 27 May 1901, and on 4 February 1902, he was interred in a grave at Skansen.

His only son Gunnar Hazelius (1874–1905) succeeded him as curator of the Nordic Museum. Gunnar Hazelius's daughter Gunnel Hazelius-Berg (1905–1997) was later costume and textile historian at the Nordic Museum. Her husband, Professor Gösta Berg (1903–1993) served as director of the Nordic Museum and Skansen from 1956 to 1963 and managing director of the Skansen Foundation from 1964.

== Other sources ==
- Artur Hazelius: Biography from Svenskt biografiskt handlexikon, Vol. I (1906), p. 467f. (in Swedish)
- Artur Hazelius: Biography from Nordisk familjebok, 2nd ed., Vol. 11, col. 148ff.
