= Esaias Tegnér Jr. =

Swedish linguist (1843–1928)

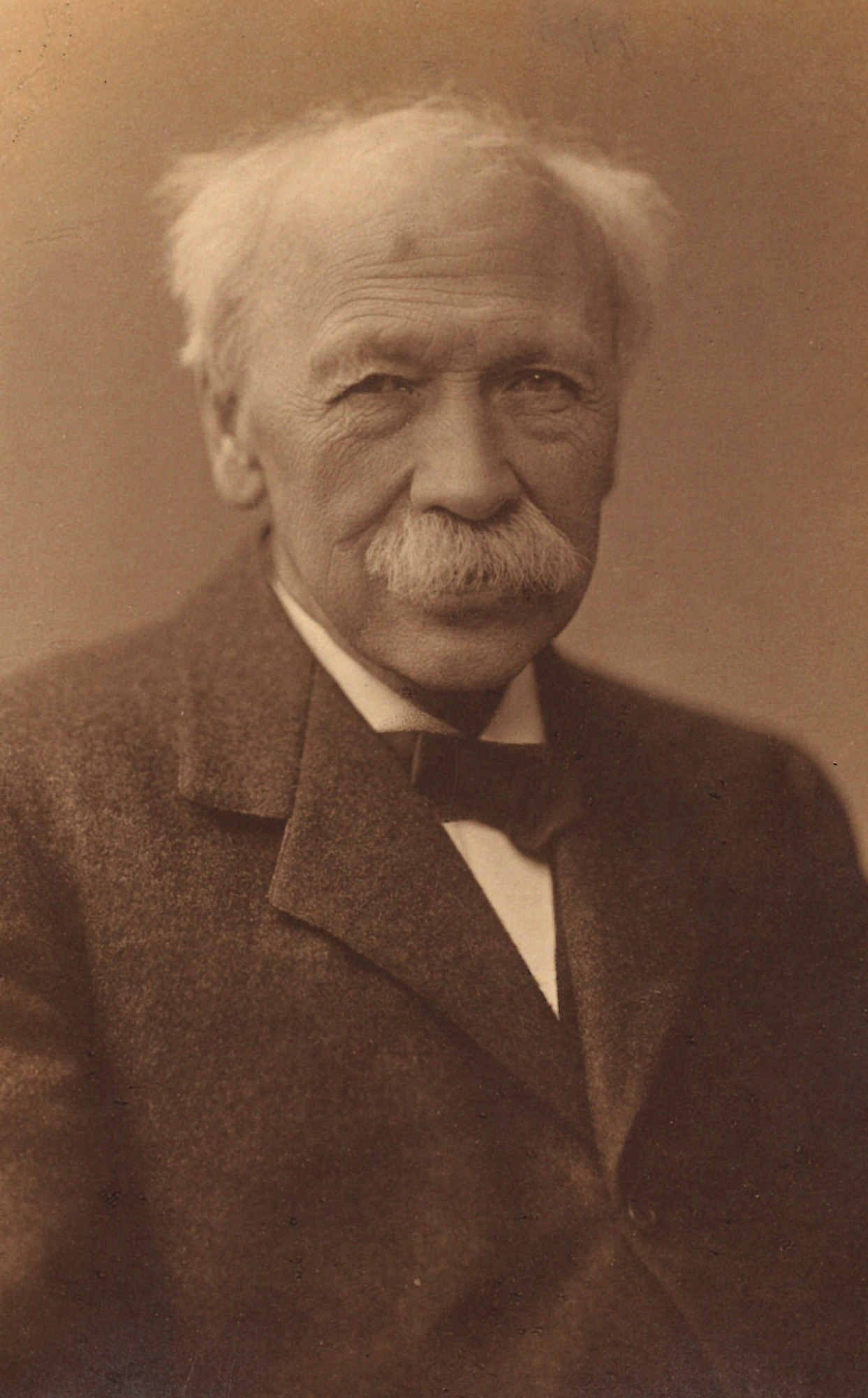
- Tegnér in 1918
- Born: 13 January 1843; Källstorp, Sweden
- Died: 21 November 1928 (aged 85); Lund, Sweden
- Spouse: Märta Maria Katarina [Ehrenborg (m. 1879)

Esaias Henrik Wilhelm Tegnér Jr. (/tɛŋˈnɛər/ teng-NAIR; Swedish: [tɛŋˈneːr]; 13 January 1843 – 21 November 1928) was a Swedish linguist. He was professor of eastern languages at Lund University 1879–1908, lead editor of Svenska Akademiens ordbok 1913–1919, member of the Bible Commission (writing a new translation) 1884–1917, and member of the Swedish Academy from 1882 onward. Tegnér was the grandson of the well-known poet Esaias Tegnér, also his namesake, and was brother-in-law to the poet and composer Alice Tegnér.

== Biography ==
Esaias Tegnér's parents were Kristofer Tegnér, a provost and vicar, and Emma Sofia Tegnér (née Kinberg). He began studying at Lund in 1859, graduated with a PhD in 1865, and became a Docent in Semitic languages the same year. In 1872 he became an adjunct professor in comparative linguistics. He further studied linguistics in Stockholm beginning 1873, and joined the Scientific Society of Uppsala in 1876.

In 1879 Tegnér married Märta Maria Katarina (née Ehrenborg) who was herself born in 1859 in Linde, Gotland County. The same year he joined the Royal Swedish Academy of Letters, History and Antiquities. He also became a member of the Royal Society of Sciences and Letters in Gothenburg in 1882, doctor of theology at Copenhagen in 1894, and a member of the Royal Swedish Academy of Sciences in 1896.

Tegnér is buried at Östra kyrkogården in Lund.

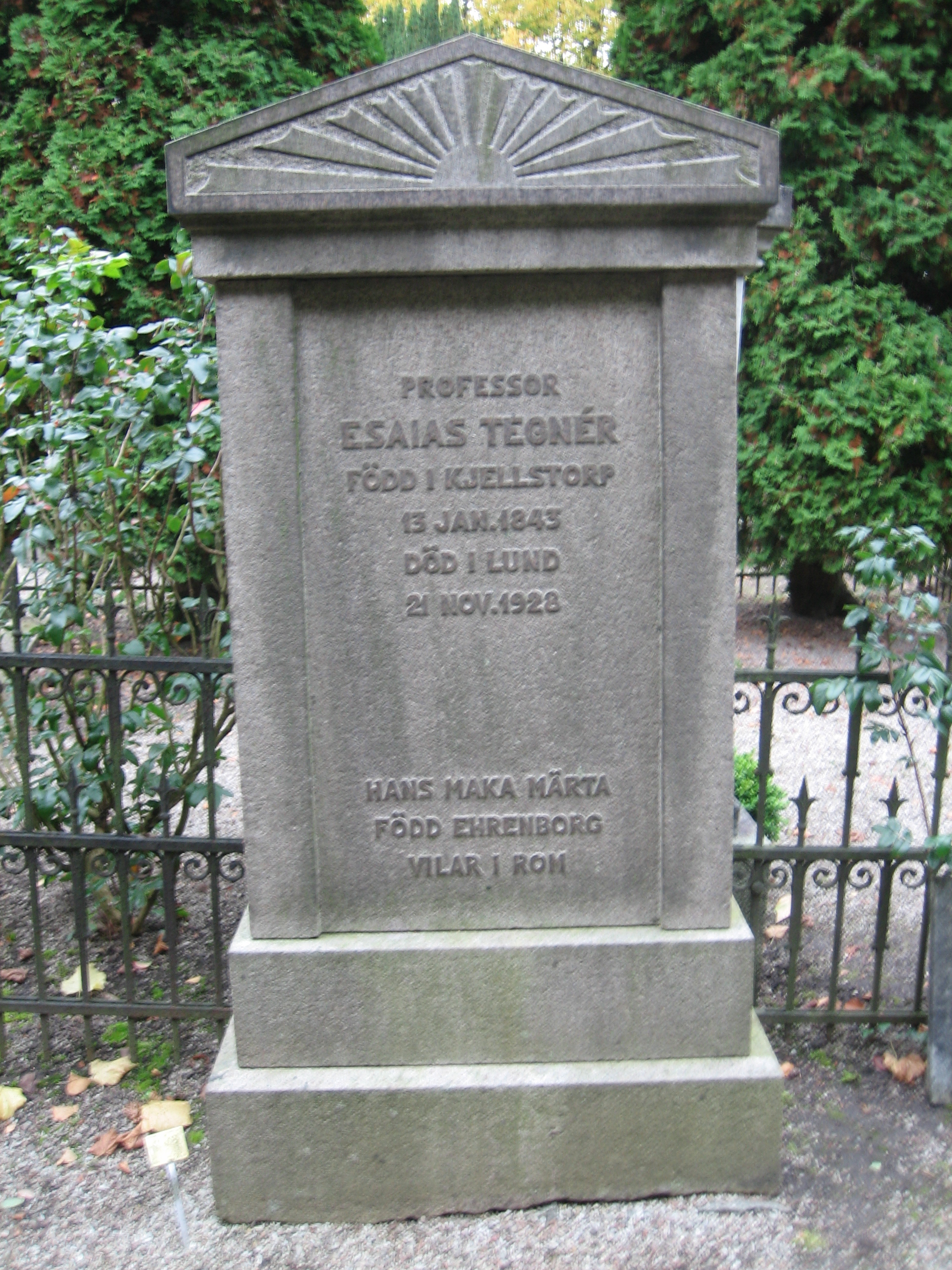
Esaias Tegnér's grave at Östra kyrkogården in Lund.

== Indo-European languages ==
Tegnér wrote just one journal article about the history of the Indo-European languages, De ariske språkens palataler (The palatals of the Aryan languages). It is an important work however, because he there suggests a solution to one of the most pressing questions in linguistics at the time. Between 1860 and 1880 three such problems were solved, represented by Grassmann's Law, Verner's law, and the palatalization law. Tegnér was one of several possible authors of the palatalization law, das Palatalgesetz, which describes a sound change in the Indo-Iranian languages. The discovery had important ramifications on the understanding of vowels in the Proto-Indo-European language.

== Language reform ==
=== Spelling ===
In the second half of the nineteenth century there was a spelling debate between conservative members of the Swedish Academy and the "new spellers", led by Adolf Noreen. Esaias Tegnér would take a moderate position.

The spelling debate arose following the release of the first edition of Svenska Akademiens ordlista (Dictionary of the Swedish Academy) in 1874, before Tegnér had joined the academy. In this dictionary, new consideration was given to new spelling suggestions that had been received in 1869 and collected into 15 points in Artur Hazelius's manifesto Om svensk rättstafning (On correct Swedish spelling) (1870–71). The first edition however did not include these modifications, and instead used the traditional spellings, standardized by Carl Gustaf af Leopold since 1801.

Tegnér joined the debate with an essay in 1886. In that essay he suggested the morphological principle of spelling as an alternative to the phonetic spelling proposed by the reformers. This morphological principle suggested that morphemes should as much as possible be spelled the same. The principle was seen as a compromise, and the sixth edition of Svenska Akademiens ordlista in 1889 exhibited Tegnér's influence in several new spellings.

=== Biblical language ===
Esaias Tegnér was during 1884-1917 a member of the Bible Commission of 1773, created by Gustav III of Sweden, and was responsible for overseeing the linguistics of the new translation.

=== Family names ===
In his 1882 paper Om Sveriges familjenamn (On Sweden's family names) Tegnér studied elements of Swedish family names. He found that several endings were not used, although they were common in names of towns and places. Nobody had yet taken names ending in -hed, -lid, -myr, -näs, -rud, -ryd, -säter, -vad, -åker, -ås or -äng. In 1939 professor Jöran Sahlgren included these in his book Svensk namnbok (Swedish book of names), which was provided by the state to aid people seeking new names. During the 20th century they have been used as name elements in several new Swedish family names.

== Bibliography ==
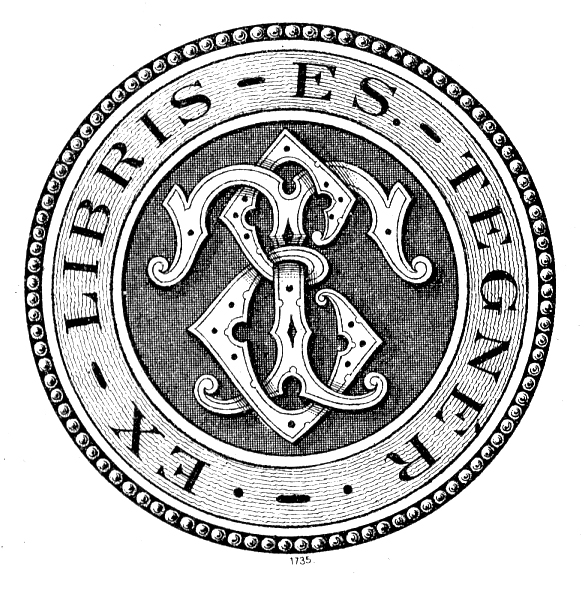
Esaias Tegnér Jr's Ex-Libris (which was also used by both his paternal grandfather and his grandfather's father).

- De nunnatione Arabica. (Gradualavhandling). Lund. 1865.
- De vocis primae radicalis et earumque declinatione quaestiones semiticae comparativae. I (in Lunds universitets årsskrift 1869)
- Om språk och nationalitet (in a Swedish periodical 1874)
- Ninives och Babylons kilskrifter (from Vår tids forskning 1875)
- De ariske språkens palataler (from Lunds universitets årsskrift, 1878)
- Språkets makt öfver tanken (from Vår tids forskning 1880)
- Hemmets ord (from Tidskrift för hemmet 1880–1881)
- Om elliptiska ord (1881)
- Om Sveriges familjenamn (from Nordic periodical 1882)
- Om poesiens språk (inaugural address to the Swedish Academy 1882 - because his predecessor, Henning Hamilton, left the academy with ignominy Tegnér did not hold the customary address about his predecessor)
- Nordiska författares arbeten om och på afrikanska språk (from Ny svensk tidskrift 1884)
- Norrmän eller danskar i Normandie? Några anmärkningar om normandiska ortnamn (from Nordisk tidskrift 1884)
- Ytterliqare om de nordiska ortnamnen i Normandie (from Nordisk tidskrift 1884)
- Antikritiska anmärkningar om svensk rättstavning (Nystavaren 1886)
- Natur och onatur i fråga om svensk rättstavning (1886)
- Den nya öfvers. af Psaltaren. Några mot-anmärkn:r (1888)
- Tal på Svenska akademiens högtidsdag den 20 december 1891 (1891)
- Om genus i svenskan (Svenska Akademiens handlingar 1892)
- Skoltal (1897)
- Studier tillegnade Esaias Tegnér. Den 13 januari 1918 (1918)
- Bland Lunds minnesvårdar (in Swedish). Stockholm. 1921.
- Ur språkens värld (3 vol.) (in Swedish). Stockholm: Bonniers. 1922–1930.
- Strödda uppsatser (postumt utgivna av Emil Olson) (in Swedish). Lund: Gleerup. 1930.

== Sources ==
- Bergman, Gösta (1970). Kortfattad svensk språkhistoria (in Swedish). Stockholm: Norstedts Akademiska Förlag. ISBN 978-91-7297-514-9.
- Clackson, James (2007). Indo-European Linguistics: An Introduction. Cambridge Textbooks in Linguistics. Cambridge, UK: Cambridge University Press. ISBN 978-0-521-65313-8.
- Collinge, Neville Edgar (1985). The laws of Indo-European. Current Issues in Linguistic Theory. Vol. 35. Amsterdam: J. Benjamins. ISBN 90-272-3530-9.
- Gellerstam, Martin (2009). "Om lånordens anpassning till svenskan". In Gellerstam, Martin (ed.). SAOL och tidens flykt: några nedslag i ordlistans historia (in Swedish) (1 ed.). Stockholm: Norstedt. pp. 105–18. ISBN 978-91-1-302270-3.
- Herman Hofberg (1906). "Tegnér, 2. Esaias Henrik Vilhelm". Svenskt biografiskt handlexikon (2nd ed.) – via Project Runeberg.
- Hovdhaugen, Even, ed. (2000). The History of Linguistics in the Nordic Countries. Helsinki: Societas scientiarum Fennica. ISBN 951-653-305-1.
- Lehmann, By Winfred P. (1973). Proto-Indo-European phonology (7. print ed.). Austin: Univ. of Texas Pr. ISBN 0-292-73341-0.
- Malmgren, Sven-Göran (2009). "Tre viktiga språkförändringar speglade i SAOL". In Gellerstam, Martin (ed.). SAOL och tidens flykt: några nedslag i ordlistans historia (in Swedish) (1 ed.). Stockholm: Norstedt. pp. 119–38. ISBN 978-91-1-302270-3.
- Pettersson, Gertrud (2005). Svenska språket under sjuhundra år: en historia om svenskan och dess utforskande (in Swedish) (2 ed.). Lund: Studentlitteratur. ISBN 91-44-03911-5.
- Ralph, Bo (2009). "När ordboken blev en ordlista". In Gellerstam, Martin (ed.). SAOL och tidens flykt: några nedslag i ordlistans historia (in Swedish) (1 ed.). Stockholm: Norstedt. pp. 31–52. ISBN 978-91-1-302270-3.
- "Esaias Tegnér". Svenska Dagbladets Årsbok. Svenska Dagbladet. 1929 – via Project Runeberg.

Cultural offices
Preceded by Henning Hamilton	Swedish Academy, Seat No 9; 1882-1928	Succeeded by Otto von Friesen
