= Johan Erik Rydqvist =

Swedish linguist

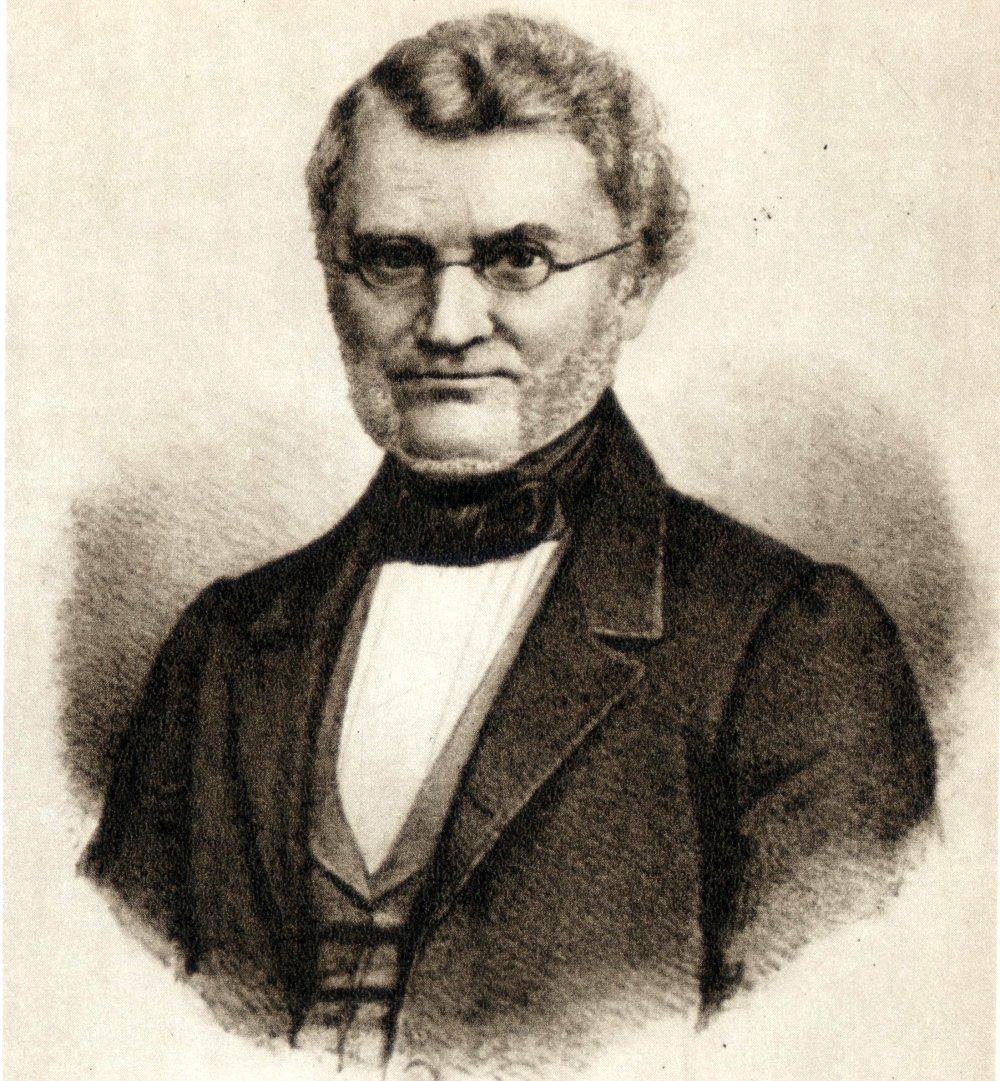
- Born: 20 October 1800; Gothenburg, Sweden
- Died: 17 December 1877 (aged 77); Stockholm, Sweden

Member of the Swedish Academy (Seat No. 5)
- In office 20 December 1849 – 17 December 1877
- Preceded by: Jöns Jacob Berzelius
- Succeeded by: Theodor Wisén

Johan Erik Rydqvist (20 October 1800 – 17 December 1877) was a Swedish linguist. He was a member of the Swedish Academy from 1849 until his death, and served as its permanent secretary from 19 October 1868 to 4 March 1869.

Cultural offices
| Preceded by Jöns Jacob Berzelius | Swedish Academy, Seat No.5; 1849-77 | Succeeded by Theodor Wisén |
