= Stig Strömholm =

Swedish legal scholar and writer (born 1931)

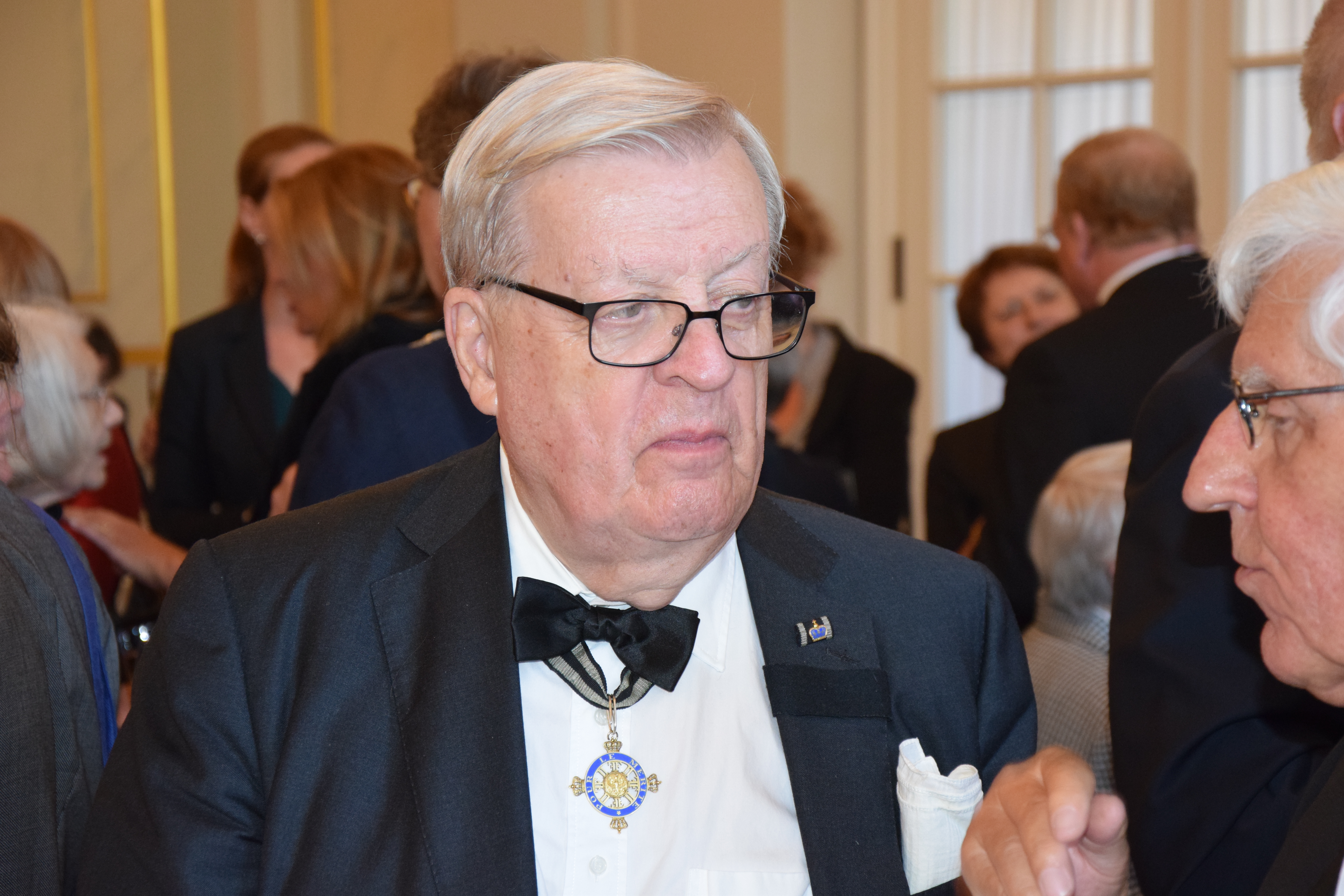
- Strömholm in 2014 wearing the Pour le Mérite
- Born: Stig Fredrik Strömholm; 16 September 1931 (age 95); Boden, Sweden
- Education: Uppsala University; LMU Munich; University of Cambridge
- Spouse: Gunilla Forslund (m. 1958; died 2013)
- Children: 2
- Relatives: Sten Strömholm (brother); Christer Strömholm (half-brother)
- Awards: See below
- Scientific career
- Fields: Law
- Workplaces: Uppsala University
- Thesis: Le droit moral de l'auteur (1966)

Stig Fredrik Strömholm (born 16 September 1931) is a Swedish former legal scholar, university leader, and academic administrator. After earning multiple law degrees in Sweden, the UK, and Germany, he began his career as a judicial clerk before moving into academia. Strömholm became professor of jurisprudence at Uppsala University in 1969, later holding the chair of civil law with international private law. He served as dean of the Faculty of Law (1973–1979), and after international appointments in London and Minnesota, he rose to vice chancellor of Uppsala University (1978–1989) and then chancellor (1989–1997). During his leadership, he also chaired the Swedish Academy's Vice-Chancellors' Conference (1992–1997) and the Association of Swedish Higher Education Institutions (1995–1997).

Beyond his university posts, Strömholm played a central role in numerous academic and cultural organizations. He chaired Svensk Juristtidning, the Max Planck Institute for Comparative and International Private Law in Munich, the Institute for Legal Research, and the Academica Foundation, among others. He also served on boards connected to the arts and culture, including the Opera Board and the Nordic Museum.

Upon his retirement in 1997, he was honored with a two-volume Festschrift recognizing his extensive contributions to legal scholarship and higher education.

== Early life and education ==
Strömholm was born on 16 September 1931 in Boden, Sweden, the son of Major Fredrik Strömholm, and his wife Gerda (née Janson). He was the brother of diplomat Sten Strömholm and the half-brother of photographer Christer Strömholm. In 1934, when Strömholm was three years old, his father died by suicide, reportedly due to chronic headaches caused by a riding accident many years earlier.

Strömholm passed studentexamen in 1949 and received his Bachelor of Arts degree from Uppsala University in 1952. He completed his reserve officer training in 1954, earned his Candidate of Law degree in 1957, and his Licentiate of Law degree in 1960. He obtained his Doctor of Law degree from Uppsala University in 1966. In 1959, he completed a Diploma in Comparative Legal Studies at Cambridge University and earned his Doctorate in Law from LMU Munich in 1964.

== Career ==
Strömholm served as a judicial clerk in the Uppsala County judicial district (Uppsala läns domsaga) from 1958 to 1960, as an extra legal clerk (fiskal) at the Svea Court of Appeal from 1961 to 1966, and as an assistant professor (docent) of comparative law at Uppsala University starting in 1966. He also held a research position in comparative law and served as a state advisor for social research from 1966 to 1969.

He was a professor of jurisprudence at Uppsala University from 1969 to 1982, then a professor of civil law with international private law from 1982 onward. He served as dean of the Faculty of Law from 1973 to 1979, honorary visiting professor at King's College London in 1977, and visiting professor at the University of Minnesota Law School in 1982. Strömholm was vice chancellor (prorektor) of Uppsala University from 1978 to 1989 and chancellor (rektor) from 1989 to 1997. He also chaired the Swedish Academy's Vice-Chancellors' Conference from 1992 to 1997 and led the Association of Swedish Higher Education Institutions (Sveriges universitet- och högskoleförbund) from 1995 to 1997. On his retirement from the rectorial chair in 1997, Strömholm received a Festschrift, Festskrift till Stig Strömholm (Uppsala 1997), in two volumes and 925 pages, including a partial bibliography (ISBN 91-7678-341-3).

He undertook various legislative and advisory roles and served on numerous boards. He was a board member of Svensk Juristtidning from 1973, becoming its chairman in 1983. He was involved with the Max Planck Institute for Comparative and International Private Law in Munich from 1973 to 1998, serving as chairman from 1980 to 1998. He was also a board member of the Institute for Legal Research (Institutet för Rättsvetenskaplig Forskning) from 1975 (chairman from 1989), chairman of the Academica Foundation (Stiftelsen Academica) from 1979, and a member of the Opera Board (Operastyrelsen) from 1980 to 1985. Additionally, he was part of the Swedish committee for the Nordic jurists' meetings from 1978 to 1999 (chairman from 1981 to 1999), chaired the International Cultural Inquiry (Internationella kulturutredningen) from 1993 to 1994, and was a board member of the Nordic Museum from 1997 and the Institute for Media Studies (Institutet för mediestudier) from 1999.

== Personal life ==
In 1958, Strömholm married Gunilla Forslund (1935–2013), the daughter of director Johan Forslund and Betty (née Forssell). They had two children: Christina (born 1962) and Fredrik (born 1965).

== Awards and decoration ==
=== Swedish ===
- (Sweden) Seraphim Medal (6 June 2012)
- (Sweden) Illis quorum, 12th size (1997)
- (Sweden) H. M. The King's Medal, 12th size gold (silver-gilt) medal worn around the neck on the Order of the Seraphim ribbon (1986)
- (Sweden) H. M. The King's Medal, 8th size gold (silver-gilt) medal worn on the chest suspended by the Order of the Seraphim ribbon (1981)
- (Sweden) Ann-Kersti och Carl-Hakon Swensons Award (2005)
- (Sweden) De Nio's Special Prize (2005)
- (Sweden) De Nio's Special Prize (2011)

=== Foreign ===
- (Iceland) Grand Knight's Cross with Star of the Order of the Falcon (24 November 1998)
- (Norway) Commander of the Royal Norwegian Order of Merit (19 August 1987)
- (Germany) Pour le Mérite (civil class) (30 May 1989)
- (Germany) Bavarian Order of Merit
- (Estonia) 2nd Class of the Order of the Cross of Terra Mariana (8 September 1995)
- (Norway) Gunnerus Medal (1997)
- (France) Grand prix de la francophonie (1992)
- Academia Europaea Erasmus Medal (2004)

== Honours and honorary degree ==
- Member of the Royal Society of Arts and Sciences of Uppsala (1968, president from 1979)
- Member of the Royal Swedish Academy of Letters, History and Antiquities (1976, president 1985–1993)
- Member of the Royal Society of the Humanities at Uppsala (1976)
- Associate member of the International Academy of Comparative Law (1976, regular member in 1988)
- Corresponding member of the Royal Skyttean Society (1979)
- Member of the Royal Swedish Academy of Sciences (1989)
- Member of the Finnish Academy of Science and Letters (1980)
- Honorary member of the Finnish Society of Sciences and Letters (1988, member in 1981)
- Member of the Royal Society of Sciences in Uppsala (1981)
- Member of the Académie européenne des sciences, des arts et des lettres (1981)
- Member of the Norwegian Academy of Science and Letters (1982)
- Member of the Royal Norwegian Society of Sciences and Letters (1985)
- Honorary member of the Royal Gustavus Adolphus Academy (1987)
- Member of the Academia Europaea (1989, president 1997–2003)
- Member of the German order Pour le Mérite (1988)
- Foreign Academicians of Science of the Research Council of Finland (1990)
- Honorary member of the Norrlands nation at Uppsala University (1969, inspector from 1978)
- Honorary member of the Uplands nation (1990)
- Honorary member of the Nathan Söderblom Society (Nathan Söderblom-sällskapet) (1991)
- Corresponding member of the Royal Academy of History, Madrid (1991)
- Foreign member of the Royal Danish Academy of Sciences and Letters (1991)
- Corresponding member of the Institut de France (Académie des Sciences Morales et Politiques) (1996)
- Foreign member of the Accademia Nazionale dei Lincei (2012)

=== Honorary degrees ===
- Honorary Doctor of the Faculty of Humanities, Uppsala University (1992)
- Honorary Doctor of Law, Jean Moulin University Lyon 3 (1980)
- Honorary Doctor of Law, University of Copenhagen (1995)
- Honorary Doctor of Philosophy, University of Helsinki (1990)

Academic offices
Preceded by Martin H:son Holmdahl	Rector of Uppsala University; 1 July 1989 – 30 June 1997	Succeeded by Bo Sundqvist
