= Björn Collinder =

Swedish linguist (1894–1983)

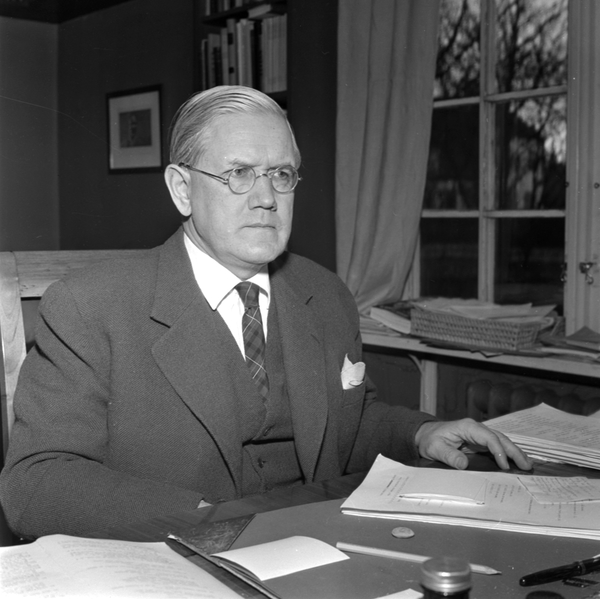
- Born: 22 July 1894; Sundsvall, Sweden
- Died: 20 May 1983 (aged 88); Vienna, Austria

Academic background
- Education: Uppsala University
- Academic advisor: K. B. Wiklund

Academic work
- Discipline: Linguistics
- Institutions: Uppsala University
- Notable students: Bo Wickman
- Main interests: Finno-Ugric languages

Erik Alfred Torbjörn "Björn" Collinder (22 July 1894 – 20 May 1983) was a Swedish linguist who was Professor of Finno-Ugric languages at Uppsala University.

== Biography ==
Collinder was born in Sundsvall, Sweden on 22 July 1894. After gaining a licentiate in Nordic philology at Uppsala University, Colinder developed a strong interest in Finno-Ugric languages. Since 1929, Collinder was a docent in Finno-Ugric languages at Uppsala University. He subsequently succeeded his mentor K.B. Wiklund as Professor of Finno-Ugric Languages at Uppsala University. Collinder retired as Professor Emeritus in 1961, and was succeeded by his protégé Bo Wickman.

Collinder specialized in the Germanic loanwords in Finnic and Sami. He was a highly productive author of scholarly literature, and also conducted fieldwork among the Sámi people. He is also noted as the translator of a number of works, including Beowulf, the Poetic Edda, the Kalevala, and many of the works of William Shakespeare. Under the initials Bj. C., he was the author of a large number of entries in Svensk uppslagsbok. His magnum opus, Comparative Grammar of the Uralic Languages, has remained the standard work on Uralic languages up to the present day.

Collinder was a member of a large number of scholarly organizations. This includes Member of the Royal Gustavus Adolphus Academy (1936), the Royal Society of the Humanities at Uppsala (1936), the Hungarian Academy of Sciences (1937), the Finnish Academy of Science and Letters (1941), the Royal Swedish Academy of Letters, History and Antiquities (1943), the Norwegian Academy of Science and Letters (1945), the Royal Society of Sciences in Uppsala (1951), the Finno-Ugrian Society, the Royal Danish Academy of Sciences and Letters (1951), and a Corresponding Member of the Finnish Literature Society (1941) and the Austrian Academy of Sciences (1966).

Collinder died in Vienna, Austria on 20 May 1983.

== Personal life ==
Collinder was the husband of Swedish soprano Britta Norrby-Collinder, and the brother of the famous astronomer Per Collinder.

== Selected works ==
- 1929. Über den finnisch-lappischen Quantitätswechsel I. Uppsala.
- 1934. Indo-uralisches Sprachgut. Uppsala.
- 1938. Lautlehre des waldlappischen dialektes von Gällivare. Helsinki: Suomalais-ugrilainen Seura. (= Mémoires de la Société finno-ougrienne 74.)
- 1939. Reichstürkische Lautstudien. Uppsala.
- 1940. Jukagirisch und Uralisch. Uppsala: Almqvist & Wiksell.
- 1943. Lappisches Wörterverzeichnis aus Härjedalen. Uppsala.
- 1947. La parenté linguistique et le calcul des probabilités. Uppsala.
- 1949. The Lapps. New York: Princeton University Press for the American Scandinavian Foundation.
- 1949. The Lappish Dialect of Jukkasjärvi: A Morphological Survey. Uppsala: Almquist & Wiksell.
- 1954. Scandinavica et fenno-ugrica. Almqvist & Wiksell.
- 1955. Fenno-Ugric Vocabulary: An Etymological Dictionary of the Uralic Languages. (Collective work.) Stockholm: Almqvist & Viksell. (Second, revised edition: Hamburg: Helmut Buske Verlag, 1977.)
- 1957. Survey of the Uralic Languages. (Collective work.) Stockholm: Almqvist & Viksell.
- 1957. Den Poetiska Eddan. Örebro: Forum.
- 1960. Comparative Grammar of the Uralic Languages. Stockholm: Almqvist & Viksell.
- 1964. Ordbok till Sveriges lapska ortnamn. Uppsala.
- 1964. The Kalevala and Its Background. Stockholm: Almqvist & Wiksell.
- 1964. Sprachverwandschaft und Wahrscheinlichkeit. Ausgewählte Schriften neu veröffentlicht zum 70. Geburtstag des Verfassers 22. Juli 1964 zusammen mit einer Bibliographie der Werke von Björn Collinder 1921-1964. Uppsala.
- 1965. An Introduction to the Uralic Languages. Berkeley and Los Angeles: University of California Press
- 1965. Hat das Uralische Verwandte ? Eine sprachvergleichende Untersuchung. Uppsala
- 1968. Kritische Bemerkungen zum saussure'schen Cours de linguistique générale. Uppsala.
- 1970. Noam Chomsky und die generative Grammatik. Eine kritische Betrachtung. Uppsala.
- 1977. Svensk ordnyckel med förkortningslexikon. Brunna: Förlagshuset Fyris AB.
- 1978. Sprache und Sprachen. Einführung in die Sprachwissenschaft. Hamburg: Buske.
- 1983. Stora ordboken. Svensk ordnyckel. Liber.

== See also ==
- Stig Wikander
- Geo Widengren
- Henrik Samuel Nyberg

== Sources ==
- "Collinder, E A T Björn". Vem är det (in Swedish). P A Norstedt & Söners. 1977. p. 188. ISBN 91-1-766022-X.
