= David Håkansson =

Swedish linguist

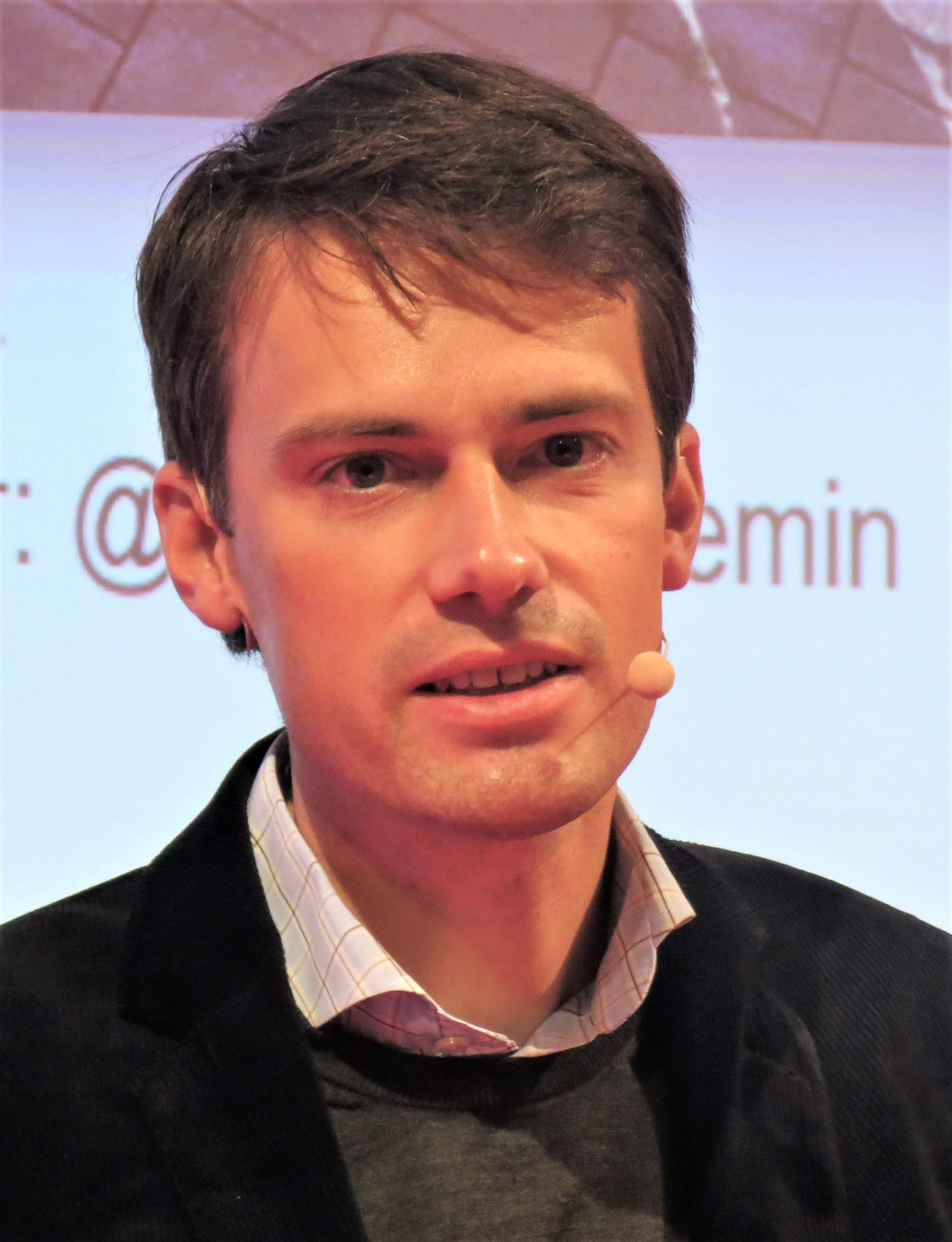
- Born: David Stefan Håkansson; 26 November 1978 (age 47); Kristianstad, Sweden
- Education: Lund University
- Occupation: linguist
- Employer: Uppsala University
- Spouse: Maria Ramberg

Member of the Swedish Academy (Seat No. 3)
- Incumbent
- Assumed office 20 December 2023
- Preceded by: Sture Allén

David Stefan Håkansson (born 26 November 1978) is a Swedish linguist and professor of Swedish languages at Uppsala University.

== Biography ==
Håkansson was born on 26 November 1978 in Kristianstad, Scania County.

In 2008, Håkansson earned his PhD from Lund University with a thesis entitled Syntactic Variation and Change: A Study of Subjectless Clauses in Old Swedish. In this study, he addresses the evolution of a Swedish subject requirement, as well as more general inquiries about the causes and processes of language change.

Håkansson remains particularly interested in the latter, concentrating primarily on issues related to grammar and historical style. His studies include a wide range of time periods, from Early Old Swedish to Modern Swedish. In his famous 2017 anthology Why Linguistics? Areas of Interest, Objects of Study and Driving Forces, he offers a comprehensive overview of the function of theory in linguistics and stresses the significance of developing research projects that are extremely pertinent from both an empirical and theoretical standpoint.

From 2013 to 2018, Håkansson was a member of the Young Academy of Sweden. He is currently a board member of the Swedish Society for Belles-Lettres and a member of the Royal Society of the Humanities at Uppsala. Additionally, he is the editor of the journal Språk och stil and the project director for How Fiction Made Swedish Modern: Fictional Writing, Writers, and Linguistic Development 1830-1930. Both linguists and literary scholars are involved in this effort, which aims to emphasize the part that fiction plays in language evolution.

In May 2023, Håkansson was elected to Seat No. 3 at the Swedish Academy, replacing the linguist Sture Allén. He took office on 20 December 2023.

Cultural offices
Preceded by Sture Allén	Swedish Academy, Seat No.3; 2023–	Succeeded by incumbent
