= Siege of Emesa (253) =

- Part of the Second campaigns of Shapur I
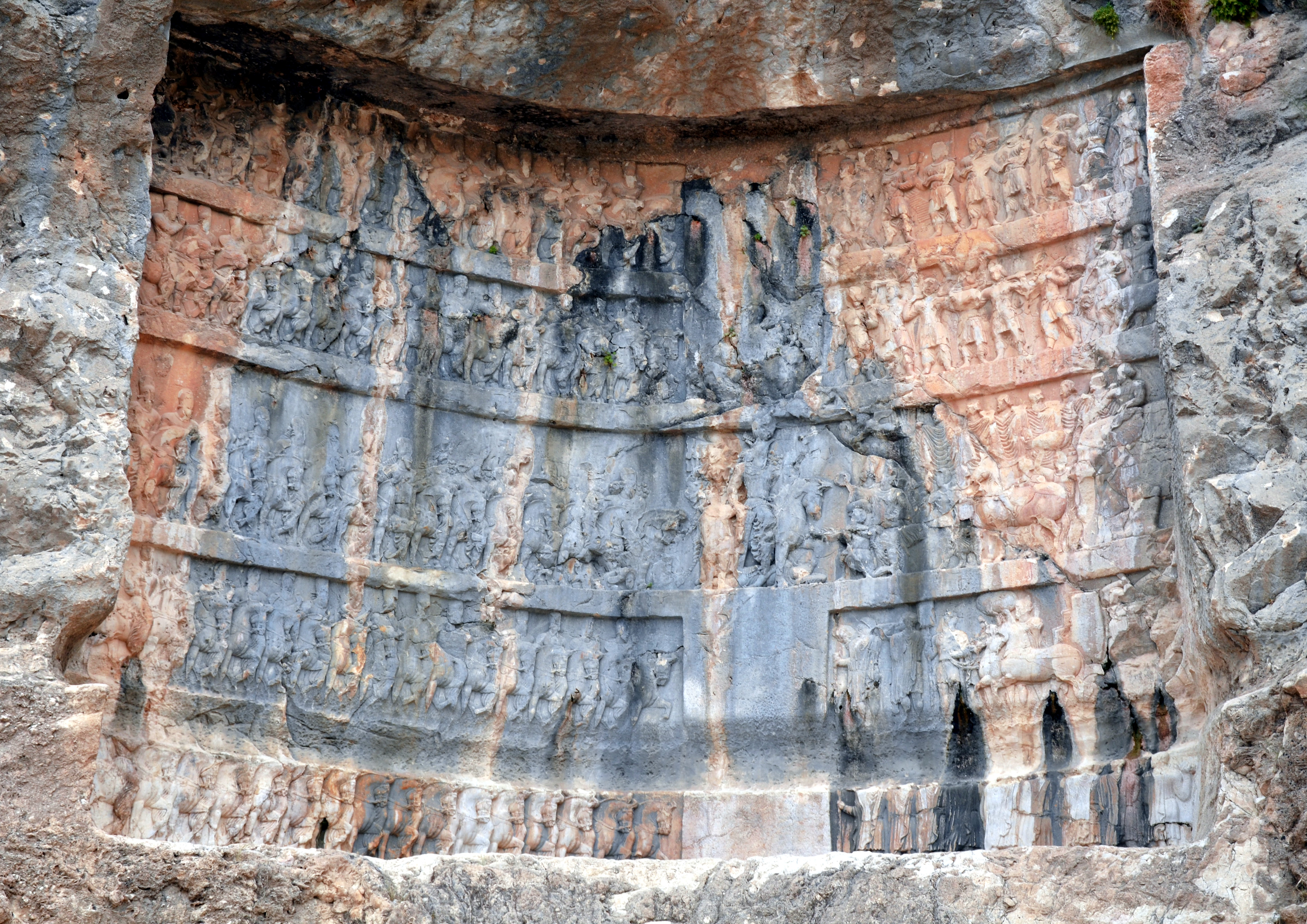
- General view of Bishapur III, Persian relief supposedly alluding to the siege
Date	November AD 253
Location	Emesa, modern-day Homs, Mesopotamia
Result	Disputed; see § Section

Belligerents
Sasanian Empire	Emesa

Commanders and leaders
Shapur I Cyriades (executed); Unnamed general †	Uranius Antoninus; Odaenathus

Strength
Unknown	Unknown

The Siege of Emesa in AD 253 followed a major expedition led by Shapur I against the eastern provinces of the Roman Empire in AD 252–253. The outcome of the siege is debated in the historiography due to contradictory sources, with it being possible that the Persians captured and subdued the city, or that they were driven out by Uranius Antoninus, with the last one being more probable and accepted by most modern sources.

== Background ==
Despite earlier successes, including the capture of Nisibis in late AD 251–252, Shapur I was temporarily unable to continue his conquest of Mesopotamia, which may explain the omission of the Siege of Emesa from his inscriptions. In AD 252/253, after having placed a Persian garrison in Nisibis, Shapur exploited the chaos that had engulfed the Roman Empire at this time, which became known to history ad the Crisis of the Third Century. Cyriades, a Roman rebel who would later play a crucial role in the Persian conquest of Antioch, likely facilitated the invasion by inciting riots in the eastern provinces, disturbances apparently referenced in the Sibylline Oracles. According to this source, when the Persians invaded, Antioch was captured, plundered, depopulated (its inhabitants taken as captives), and destroyed. Hierapolis (modern Manbij), Beroia (modern Aleppo), and Chalcis (modern Qinnasrin) suffered similar fates before all of Roman Syria and parts of Asia Minor were devastated and pillaged. John Malalas, citing Domninus of Antioch, an Antiochene chronicler, alludes to Cyriades' role in the conquest of Antioch and briefly mentions Shapur's invasion of Syria through Chalcis, which he termed the Syrian Gate.

== Siege ==
=== According to primary sources ===
Following his account of the events at Antioch, Malalas apparently describes the army's return, during which Cyriades was executed, possibly by his own men, either by being beheaded or by being burnt to death. and Shapur besieged Emesa, an event seemingly referenced in the Sibylline Oracles and in Greek graffiti from Qal'at el-Haways. According to Baldus, the event has also a section of the Res Gestae Divi Saporis about a supposedly successful Sassanid campaign also refer to the events surrounding Uranius Antoninus, without mentioning his name. Both Overlaet and Baldus place this event in November AD 253.

Emesa dispatched a certain Samsigeramus, who is identified by many as the Emesan usurper Uranius Antoninus, as an emissary to Shapur. During his reception, Domninus of Antioch falsely reports that the shah was killed in his camp near Emesa, and his fleeing army was pursued first by Samsigeramus and then by Odaenathus. The mention of Odaenathus in this episode may represent an anticipation of his active participation in the war against Shapur in the 260s, though it could also allude to an active role in Syrian political events during the previous decade. This would suggest that Domninus' account contains some element of truth. As Rostovtzeff has demonstrated, it is highly probable that during his advance up the Euphrates, or even earlier, Shapur entered into negotiations with Odaenathus, whose headquarters was at Palmyra, to secure his rear and ensure abundant supplies of horses, camels, sheep, grain, and dates. John Malalas presents a similar account of events, although according to Overlaet, his account is a mix of different episodes, and presents different inaccuracies.

The sixth-century historian Peter the Patrician wrote that Odaenathus approached Shapur I to negotiate Palmyrene interests but was rebuffed and the gifts sent to the Persians were thrown into the river.

=== Modern reconstruction ===
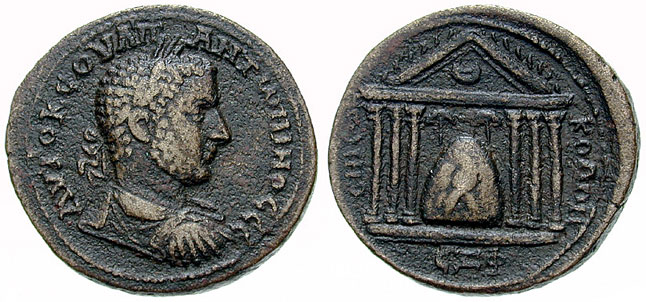
Uranius Antoninus coin, depicting the Emesa temple to the sun god El-Gabal, with the holy stone on the reverse.

Most of the modern sources state that Uranius Antoninus was at the command of the garrison of Emesa and was successful in the defense of the city. During the siege, instead of the death of the shah, as Domninus of Antioch falsely claims, Baldus proposes to see the killing of an unnamed Sasanian general in charge of a Sasanian contingent as the triggering factor for a Persian retreat. Then, Odaenathus pursued the Persian columns as they withdrew over the Euphrates and defeated them.

On the other hand, Bruno Overlaet has analyzed the Persian reliefs at Bishapur and concluded that the city was submitted to the Persians. Another of Overlaet's hypotheses suggests that a treaty between the two sides followed a minor Sasanian defeat in the city.

== Aftermath ==
Having repelled Shapur's campaign, Uranius Antoninus usurped and started minting his own coins. However, his uprising was crushed by the army of Roman Emperor Valerian in AD 253/254. The circumstances are unclear, but it is possible that he was killed in this rebellion.

== Bibliography ==
- Baldus, Hans Roland (1971). Uranius Antoninus: Münzprägung und Geschichte [Uranius Antoninus: Coinage and History]. Rudolf Habelt Verlag. ISBN 978-3-774-91112-3.
- Drinkwater, John (2005). "Maximinus to Diocletian and the 'Crisis'". In Bowman, Alan; Garnsey, Peter; Cameron, Averil (eds.). The Cambridge Ancient History, Volume 12: The Crisis of Empire, AD 193–337. Cambridge University Press. pp. 28–66. ISBN 978-0-521-30199-2.
- Edwell, Peter (2010). "The Sources for Rome's Wars with Shapur I: Eurocentric and Eastern Perspectives". Ancient West & East. 9: 155–79. doi:10.2143/AWE.9.0.2056306.
- Hartmann, Udo (2006). "Mareades: ein sasanidischer Quisling?" [Marades: a Sasanian Quisling?]. In Wiesehöfer, Josef; Huyse, Philip (eds.). Ērān ud Anērān: Studien zu den Beziehungen zwischen dem Sasanidenreich und der Mittelmeerwelt [Ērān ud Anērān: Studies on the Relations between the Sasanian Empire and the Mediterranean World]. Frnaz Steiner Verlag. pp. 105–42. ISBN 978-3-515-08829-9.
- Overlaet, Bruno (2009). "A Roman Emperor at Bishapur and Darabgird: Uranius Antoninus and the Black Stone of Emesa". Iranica Antiqua. 44: 461–530. doi:10.2143/IA.44.0.2034386.
- Overlaet, Bruno (2017). "Šāpur I: Rock reliefs". Encyclopaedia Iranica Online.
- Rostovtzeff, Mikhail Ivanovich (1943). "Res Gestae Divi Saporis and Dura". Berytus Archaeological Studies. 8 (1): 17–60. Archived from the original on 29 May 2002.
