= Stanley Insler =

American philologist (1937–2019)

Stanley Insler (June 23, 1937 – January 5, 2019) was an American philologist who specialized in Indo-Iranian linguistics.

== Early life ==
He was born in New York City on June 23, 1937, to a Jewish family, to parents Clara and Frank, and attended the Bronx High School of Science until the age of sixteen, when he enrolled at Columbia University. Insler graduated from Columbia College in 1957. He studied at the University of Tübingen from 1960 to 1962, and completed a doctorate at Yale University in 1963. Upon earning his Ph.D. Insler joined Yale's faculty, where he was later named the Edward E. Salisbury Professor of Sanskrit and Comparative Philology. Among his many publications are The Gāthās of Zarathustra, Acta Iranica 8 (Tehéran-Lìege: Bibliothèque Pahlavi; Leiden: diffusion E. J. Brill, [1974] 1975), "The Love of Truth in Ancient Iran," Parsiana (September, 1989), 18–20; chapters on “Human Behavior and Good Thinking” and “Zarathustra’s Vision” in An Introduction to the Gathas of Zarathustra, ed. Dina G. McIntyre (Pittsburgh, 1989–90). In 2001, he was elected fellow of the American Academy of Arts and Sciences. He was granted emeritus status upon retirement in 2012 and died at Yale–New Haven Hospital on January 5, 2019, aged 81.
