= Vesta Sarkhosh Curtis =

Curator and researcher of Middle Eastern Coins

- وستا سرخوش کرتیس
- Born: Vesta Sarkhosh (وستا سرخوش); 1951 (age 74–75); Iran
- Citizenship: British
- Education: MA from University of Göttingen; PhD from University College London
- Organization: British Museum
- Spouse: John Curtis

Vesta Sarkhosh Curtis (b. 1951) is the British Museum's Curator of Middle Eastern coins. She is Joint Director of the International Parthian Coin Project, The Sylloge Nummorum Parthicorum (SNP), and Joint Editor of the SNP series.

Curtis was born in Tehran in 1951. She obtained her MA in Near Eastern Archaeology and Ancient Iranian Languages from the University of Göttingen and her PhD on Parthian art from University College London. In 1983-2003, Curtis was the Joint Editor of Iran: Journal of the British Institute of Persian Studies, in 1998-2003 Secretary of the British Institute of Persian Studies (BIPS), in 2006-2011, President of BIPS, and in 2005-2010 secretary of the Royal Numismatic Society. Curtis is a member of the Academic Committee of the Iran Heritage Foundation (IHF).

Curtis is the honorary director of the British Institute of Persian Studies. She is married to John Curtis FBA, CEO of the Iran Heritage Foundation and the British Museum Keeper of Special Middle East Projects.

Curtis has taken part in expert panels on In Our Time four times.

== Selected publications ==
- Rivalling Rome. Parthian Coins and Culture, by Vesta Sarkhosh Curtis and Alexandra Magub (Spink, 2020); ISBN 9781912667444
- Curtis, Vesta Sarkhosh; Pendleton, Elizabeth J; Alram, Michael; Daryaee, Touraj (2017), The Parthian and early Sasanian empires : adaptation and expansion : proceedings of a conference held in Vienna, 14-16 June 2012, British Institute of Persian Studies archaeological monographs series, 5., Oxbow Books, ISBN 9781785709623
- Curtis, Vesta Sarkhosh; Canby, Sheila R (2014), Persian love poetry, Interlink Books, an imprint of Interlink Publishing Group, Inc, ISBN 978-1566569552
- Curtis, Vesta Sarkhosh (2009), The rise of Islam, Idea of Iran, 4, I.B. Tauris, ISBN 978-1845116910
- Curtis, Vesta Sarkhosh (2005), Persian myths, Legendary past, University of Texas Press, ISBN 9780292711587
- Curtis, Vesta Sarkhosh; Hillenbrand, Robert (1998), The art and archaeology of ancient Persia : new light on the Parthian and Sasanian empires, London, ISBN 9781860640452
