= Stig Wikander =

Swedish Indologist and Iranologist

- Born: 27 August 1908; Norrtälje, Sweden
- Died: 20 August 1983 (aged 74); Uppsala, Sweden
- Partner: Gunnel Heikel
- Children: 3

Academic background
- Education: Uppsala University
- Thesis: Der Arische Männerbund (1938)
- Academic advisor: Henrik Samuel Nyberg
- Influences: Otto Höfler

Academic work
- Discipline: Indo-European studies; Indology; Iranology
- Institutions: Uppsala University
- Notable students: Bo Utas; Jaan Puhvel
- Main interests: Indo-Iranian religion
- Influenced: Georges Dumézil

Oscar Stig Wikander (27 August 1908 – 20 December 1983) was a Swedish Indologist, Iranologist and religious scientist.

== Biography ==
Stig Wikander was born in Norrtälje, Sweden on 27 August 1908, the son of a pharmacist. After graduating from high school in Uppsala at seventeen, Wikander enrolled at Uppsala University, where he received an MA in Latin and Greek summa cum laude at the age of eighteen. His mentor at Uppsala University was Henrik Samuel Nyberg. Wikander subsequently went to the University of Paris, the Friedrich Wilhelm University of Berlin, and the University of Copenhagen. In Paris he became a member of the prestigious Société Asiatique. At the University of Copenhagen, he studied under Arthur Christensen.

While still young, Wikander gained a reputation as a brilliant scholar with deep knowledge across a wide range of fields. From 1935 to 1936, Wikander and Geo Widengren arranged Avesta seminars at Uppsala University under Nyberg. Wikander gained his PhD in Iranian languages and religions at Uppsala University in 1938. His PhD examined lexical evidence in Sanskrit and the Avestan language on the importance of young warrior bands among the Indo-Iranians. It was published in German under the title Der Arische Männerbünde (1938). Wikander's thesis was much influenced by the research of the Austrian philologist Otto Höfler, who taught German at Lund University from 1928 to 1934. From 1938 to 1939, Wikander taught Swedish at the Ludwig-Maximilians-Universität München, where Höfler was a professor of German philology and folklore.

In 1941, Wikander published his study on the Indo-Iranian wind god Vayu. He was subsequently appointed Docent of Indo-Iranian languages at Lund University. After World War II, Wikander served as a Red Cross delegate in Greece and Turkey.

In 1947, together with linguist Bertil Malmberg, Wikander co-founded the journal Studia Linguistica. From 1947 to 1948, Wikander taught the history of religions as a visiting professor at Uppsala University. In 1953, Wikander was appointed Chair of Sanskrift and Comparative Indo-European Philology at Uppsala University. He also served as a visiting professor at Columbia University (1959–1960) and El Colegio de México (1967). Wikander was a close friend of the historian of religion Mircea Eliade, with whom he corresponded frequently in French. Among the topics discussed between them is the idea to create a distinct science of religion separated from the field of history of religion. Wikander was also close friend of Georges Dumézil, who had taught French at Uppsala University from 1931 to 1933. The works of Wikander had a strong influence on Dumézil's research on Indo-European religion. Prominent students of Wikander include Folke Josephson, Gunilla Gren-Eklund and Bo Utas. Wikander was considered an expert on Germanic Antiquity.

Wikander retired in 1974. He died in Uppsala on 20 December 1983. The works of Wikander are still of importance to modern students of religion, particularly because he was able to draw upon a diverse number of primary sources in Greek, Latin, Arabic, Indo-Iranian and other languages to build his arguments.

== Personal life ==
Wikander was married to the nurse Gunnel Heikel (1911–1973). Together they had three daughters.

== See also ==
- Jan de Vries
- Edgar C. Polomé
- Björn Collinder
- Vilhelm Grønbech

== Selected works ==
- Der arische Männerbund : Studien zur indo-iranischen Sprach- und Religionsgeschichte, Lund, Ohlsson, 1938 (Ph.D. thesis).
- Vayu : Texte und Untersuchungen zur indo-iranischen Religionsgeschichte, t. 1. Texte, Uppsala-Leipzig, 1941.
- Gudinnan Anahita och den zoroastiska eldskulten, Uppsala, 1942.
- Feuerpriester in Kleinasien und Iran (Acta Regia Societatis humaniorum litterarum Lundensis, 40), Lund, 1946.
- "Pāṇḍavasagan och Mahābhāratas mystiska förutsättningar", Religion och Bibel 6, 1947, pp. 27–39.
- Araber, vikingar, väringar (Svenska humanistiska förbundet 90), Lund, 1978.

== Sources ==
- Utas, Bo; Duchesne-Guillemin, Jacques (July 15, 2009). "WIKANDER, Oscar Stig". Encyclopædia Iranica.
- Strutynski, Udo (1974). "History and Structure in Germanic Mythology". In Larson, Gerald J.; Puhvel, Jaan; Littleton, C. Scott (eds.). Myth in Indo-European Antiquity. University of California Press. pp. 29–50. ISBN 0-520-02378-1.
- Timus, Mihaela (2005). "Wikander, Stig". In Jones, Lindsay (ed.). Encyclopedia of Religion. Vol. 14 (2 ed.). Macmillan Reference USA. pp. 9734–9736. ISBN 0-02-865983-X.
