= Svenska Vitterhetssamfundet =

Svenska Vitterhetssamfundet (SVS) or The Swedish Society for Belles-Lettres is a Swedish non-profit membership organization formed in 1907 for the purpose of publishing scholarly text critical editions of works by the most-important authors in Swedish literature.

Membership is 300 kr. (approximately 30 euro) per year and includes a subscription of the volumes published in that year.

== President ==
1. 1907–1918: Karl Warburg
2. 1918–1947: Otto Sylwan
3. 1947–1969: Elias Wessén
4. 1969–1980: Carl Ivar Ståhle
5. 1980–1984: Bertil Molde
6. 1984–2013: Sture Allén
7. 2013–2019: Anders Olsson
8. Since 2019: Paula Henrikson

== Publications ==
Between 1910 and 2004, the society published 250 volumes covering thirty-some authors. The first to be presented in full text on the Internet was Carl Jonas Love Almqvist. The publishing plan for this author alone comprises fifty-one volumes of which eleven are now available online.

=== Swedish authors published by SVS ===
- Olof von Dalin (1708–1763)
- Carl Gustaf Leopold (1756–1829)
- Erik Johan Stagnelius (1793–1823)
- Lars Johansson, "Lasse Lucidor" (1638–1674)
- Carl Michael Bellman (1740–1795)
- Anna Maria Lenngren (1754–1817)
- Gunno Eurelius Dahlstierna (1661–1709)
- Georg Stiernhielm (1598–1672)
- Johan Henric Kellgren (1751–1795)
- Carl August Ehrensvärd (1745–1800)
- Hedvig Charlotta Nordenflycht (1718–1763)
- Erik Sjöberg, "Vitalis" (1794–1828)
- Jacob Wallenberg (1746–1778)
- Bengt Lidner (1757–1793)
- Thomas Thorild (1759–1808)
- Johan Ludvig Runeberg (1804–1877)
- Johan Runius (1679–1713)
- Viktor Rydberg (1828–1895)
- August Strindberg (1849–1912)
- Carl Jonas Love Almqvist (1793–1866)
- Johan Olof Wallin (1779–1839)
- Per Daniel Amadeus Atterbom (1790–1855)
- Gustaf Rosenhane, "Skogekär Bergbo" (1619–1684)
- Fredrika Bremer (1801–1865)
- Emilie Flygare-Carlén (1807–1892)
- Samuel Columbus (1642-1679)
- Urban Hiärne (1641–1724)
- Israel Holmström (1661–1708)
- Sophie von Knorring (1797–1848)
- Hans Gustaf Rålamb (1716–1790)
- Haquin Spegel (1645–1714)
- Johan Gabriel Werving (1675–1715)

== See also ==
- List of Swedish poets
- List of Swedish-language writers
- Swedish Academy
- Swedish literature
