= Carl Ivar Ståhle =

Swedish linguist (1913–1980)

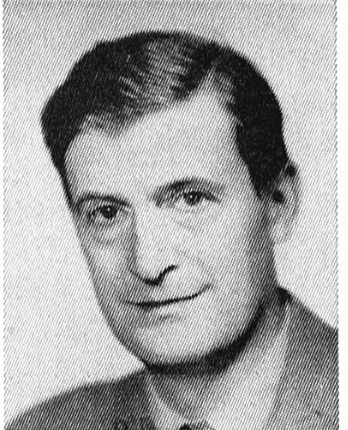
- Carl Ivar Ståhle in 1953
- Born: 27 June 1913; Stenberga, Sweden
- Died: 12 June 1980 (aged 66); Lidingö, Sweden
- Occupations: Professor of Nordic languages at Stockholm University; Member of the Swedish Academy
- Spouse: Anna Greta Ståhle (m. 1940)
- Awards: Knight of The Royal Order of the Polar Star

Member of the Swedish Academy (Seat No. 3)
- In office 20 December 1974 – 12 June 1980
- Preceded by: Henrik Samuel Nyberg
- Succeeded by: Sture Allén

Carl Ivar Ståhle (27 June 1913 – 12 June 1980) was a Swedish linguist, toponymist, and member of the Swedish Academy.

== Biography ==
Ståhle was born in Stenberga, Jönköping County. He became a student at Norra Latin in 1927. Following matriculation examination (Studentexamen) in 1931, he entered Stockholm University 1932. In 1946 he defended his doctoral thesis in Nordic languages titled "Studier över de svenska ortnamnen på -inge" (studies on Swedish place names with -inge). He worked at the Royal Swedish Academy of Letters, History and Antiquities between 1946 and 1954. In 1955, he became professor of Nordic languages at Stockholm University. He was, however, forced to leave the position in 1971 due to declining health, but began working as a researcher at the Swedish Academy. He was elected to chair 3 of the Swedish Academy in 1974.

Ståhle was a very productive researcher and writer. He was also an active editor and publisher with duties in many different associations, committees, and academies. He was president of Svenska språknämnden, a predecessor of the current Swedish Language Council, from 1967. Between 1963 and 1969 he was a member of "1963 års bibelkommitté". This was a committee tasked by the Swedish government to write a report (SOU) on the prerequisites for making a new Swedish translation of the bible. Ståhle was also president of Svenska Vitterhetssamfundet (The Swedish Society for Belles-Lettres) from 1969 until his death.

Ståhle married Anna Greta Ståhle (1913 – 2006) in 1940. She was a journalist at the newspaper Dagens Nyheter. They had two daughters and a son.

== Memberships in Royal Academies ==
- Member of the sv:Samfundet för utgivande av handskrifter rörande Skandinaviens historia from 1953
- Member of the Royal Swedish Academy of Letters, History and Antiquities from 1962
- Member of the Royal Gustavus Adolphus Academy from 1964
- Member of the Swedish Academy from 1974

== Bibliography ==
- Studier över de svenska ortnamnen på -inge: På grundval av undersökningar i Stockholms län (1946)
- Elias Wesséns bibliografi: 15 April 1949 (1949)
- Ortnamn och bebyggelse i Västra Vingåker (1954)
- Ett fragment av den fornsvenska Birgittaöversättningen (1956)
- Syntaktiska och stilistiska studier i fornnordiskt lagspråk (1958)
- Främmande ord i nusvenskan (1962)
- Svenskt bibelspråk från 1500-tal till 1900-tal (1970)
- 1900-talssvenska (1970)
- H. S. Nyberg. Inträdestal i Svenska akademien (1974)
- Vers och språk i Vasatidens och stormaktstidens svenska diktning (1975)
- Stockholmsnamn och Stockholmsspråk (1981)
- Studier över Östgötalagen. Efter författarens efterlämnade manuskript utgivna av Gösta Holm (1988)

Cultural offices
| Preceded by Henrik Samuel Nyberg | Swedish Academy, Seat No.3; 1974–1980 | Succeeded by Sture Allén |
