= Anders Hultgård =

Swedish religious studies scholar

- Born: 23 December 1936 (age 89); Stettin, Germany

Academic background
- Education: Uppsala University
- Doctoral advisor: Geo Widengren

Academic work
- Discipline: Religious studies
- Institutions: University of Bergen; Uppsala University
- Main interests: Abrahamic religions; Indo-European religions

Anders Hultgård (born 23 December 1936) is a Swedish theologist and religious studies scholar who is Professor Emeritus and former Chair of Religious History at Uppsala University. He specializes in the study of Indo-European religions.

== Biography ==
Anders Hultgård was born in Stettin, Germany on 23 December 1936, the son of Nils Hultgård och Britta Paulsson. His father was Vicar of Norrköping. After graduating from high school, Hultgård served in the Swedish Army. He subsequently studied German, French and Greek literature at Uppsala University. After gaining an MA in these subjects in 1961, Hultgård studied theology, gaining a PhD in religious studies under the supervision of Geo Widengren in 1971. His dissertation examined the eschatology of the Testaments of the Twelve Patriarchs. He was ordained as a clergyman in the Church of Sweden in Linköping in 1973. He gained his habilitation on the history of religion in 1975. He subsequently lectured at Uppsala until 1985. In 1978–1980, Hultgård was a visiting researcher at the Swedish Theological Institute in Jerusalem, where he led an archaeological expedition.

From 1985 to 1990, Hultgård was Professor of Religious Studies at the University of Bergen, where he lectured particularly on Norse mythology. In the spring of 1990, Hultgård was a visiting professor at the University of California, Santa Barbara. Hultgård subsequently lectured at Uppsala University, where he in 1995 was appointed Chair of Religious History, with a particular focus on Indo-European religions. Hultgåd retired as Professor Emeritus in 2001.

In the Fall of 2010, Hultgård was a Fellow at the Swedish Collegium for Advanced Study in Uppsala, Sweden.

Hultgård is the author of numerous scholarly works on religious history. He is known as an expert on Indo-European religion, particularly Old Norse religion and Iranian religions. Hultgård is a member of the Nathan Söderblom Society and the Royal Gustavus Adolphus Academy.

== Sources ==
- Michael Stausberg (2001), "Vorwort", in Olof Sundqvist; Astrid van Nahl [in German]; Michael Stausberg (eds.), Kontinuitäten und Brüche in der Religionsgeschichte – Festschrift für Anders Hultgård zu seinem 65. Geburtstag am 23.12.2001, Reallexikon der Germanischen Altertumskunde – Ergänzungsbände (in German), vol. 31, Berlin u. a.: de Gruyter, pp. VII–X, ISBN 3-11-017264-X
