= Erik Sjöberg =

Erik Sjöberg may refer to:

- Erik Sjöberg (poet)
- Erik Sjöberg (historian)

== See also ==
- Lars-Erik Sjöberg
