= Carl-Göran Ekerwald =

Swedish novelist and literary critic (1923–2025)

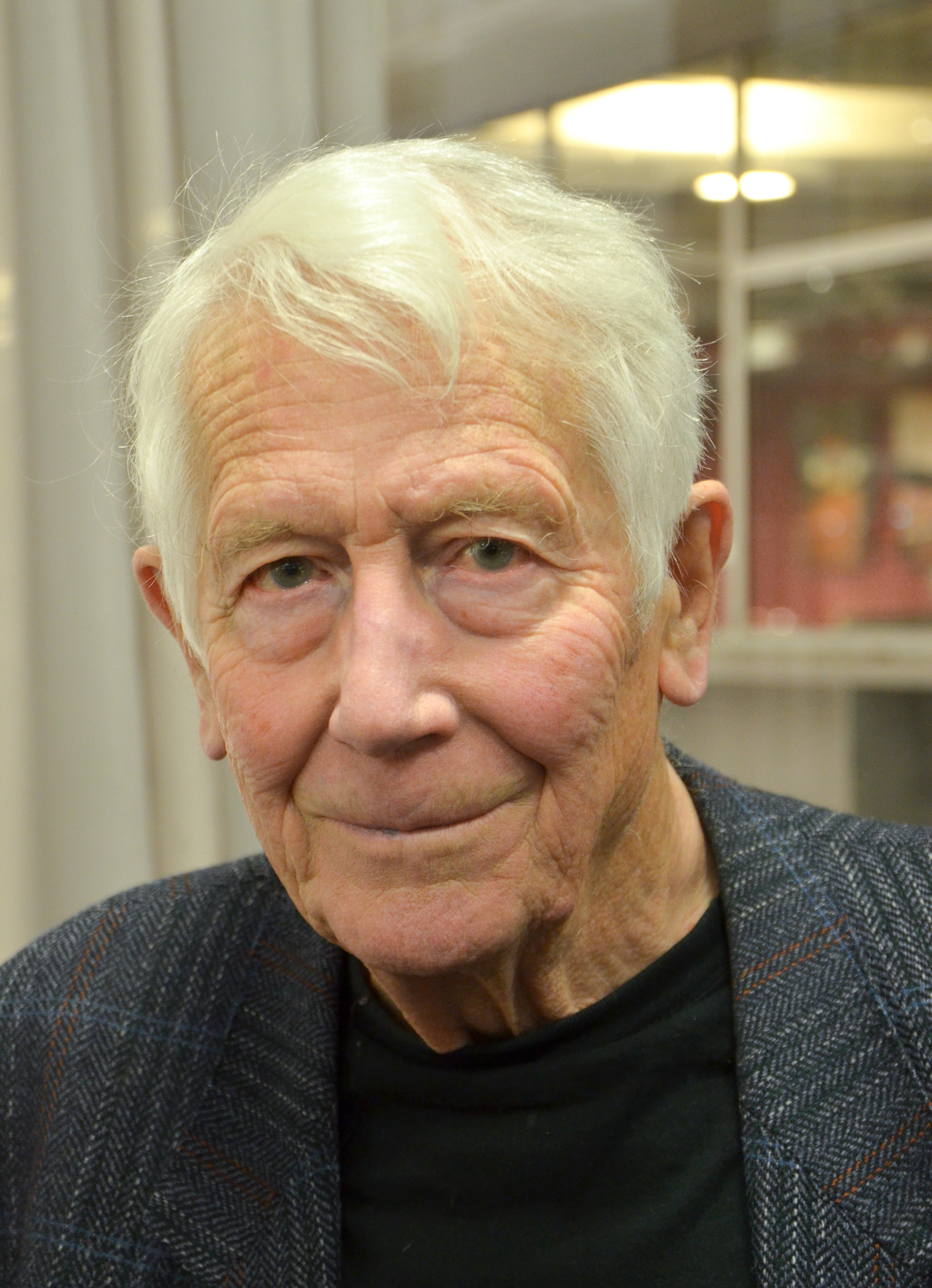
- Ekerwald in 2013
- Born: Carl-Göran Ekerwald; 30 December 1923; Östersund, Sweden
- Died: 8 April 2025 (aged 101); Knivsta, Sweden
- Education: Uppsala University
- Occupations: Novelist, literary critic, translator, forest worker and teacher
- Partner: Sigrid Kahle (2010–2013)
- Awards: Dobloug Prize (1987)

Carl-Göran Ekerwald (30 December 1923 – 8 April 2025) was a Swedish novelist, literary critic, translator, forest worker and teacher.

== Life and career ==
Ekerwald was born in Östersund. After studies at Uppsala University, he worked as a teacher and a principal. He made his literary debut with Elden och fågelungen, a collection of short stories, in 1959; several of his literary works have been said to deal with the relation between eccentrics, or outsiders, and society. From the 1990s, he wrote several intellectual biographies on Horace, Voltaire, Shakespeare, Céline and Nietzsche. Ekerwald was also known to have introduced and popularized Persian culture and literature in Sweden; he edited the volumes Persiska antologin (1976) and Persisk balsam (2007), two anthologies of translations of Sufi poets and mystics such as Attar of Nishapur, Omar Khayyam, and Rumi, made by Eric Hermelin. Ekerwald also translated works by Ulrike Meinhof and Antonio Gramsci into Swedish. In later years, he also wrote memoirs, including Skogvaktarens pojke (2002), which deals with his upbringing in Jämtland.

Ekerwald was awarded an honorary doctorate at Umeå University in 1986, and the Dobloug Prize in 1987. He was married twice; first to Anna Ekerwald from 1945 until her death in 2009, and second to Sigrid Kahle from 2010 until her death in 2013.

Ekerwald turned 100 on 30 December 2023, upon which he reflected in his last published book, Fördelen med att bli gammal, from the same year. He died on 8 April 2025, at th age of 101.
