= Iranian studies =

Interdisciplinary field

Iranian studies (Persian: ايران‌شناسی Irânšenâsi), also referred to as Iranology and Iranistics, is an interdisciplinary field dealing with the research and study of the civilization, history, literature, language, art and culture of Iranian peoples. It is a part of the wider field of Oriental studies.

Iranian studies is broader than Persian studies, which is the study of the Persian language and literature specifically. The discipline of Iranian Studies focuses on broad trends in culture, history, language and other aspects of not only Persians, but also a variety of other contemporary and historical fellow Iranian peoples, such as Kurds, Lurs, Gilakis, Talysh, Tajiks, Pashtuns, Ossetians, Baluchis, Scythians, Sarmatians, Alans, Parthians, Sogdians, Bactrians, Khwarazmians, and Mazandaranis.

== In medieval Iran ==
The medieval Persian poet Ferdowsi, author of the Iranian national epic the Shahnameh, can be considered the founder of Iranian studies in the sense that in his work he made a deliberate effort to highlight Persian culture and Iranian civilization. Ferdowsi's work follows earlier semi-historical works such as the lost Sasanian-era Khwaday-Namag.

An important work of Persian historiography is the Tarikh-i Mas'udi of Abulfazl Bayhaqi (995-1077), whose fluent prose style was highly influential on subsequent Persian literature. Persian historical writing reached its peak two centuries later with the Jami al-Tawarikh of Rashīd al-Dīn Fadhl-allāh Hamadānī (1247–1318). Other important historical works include the Tarikh-i Jahangushay by Ata-Malik Juvayni and the Zafarnamah of Sharaf ad-Din Ali Yazdi, a history of the Persianized conqueror Timur (Tamerlane; 1370–1405).

== In modern Iran ==
Twentieth-century scholars in Iran associated with this field include Badiozzaman Forouzanfar, Abdolhossein Zarrinkoub, Zabihollah Safa, Mojtaba Minovi, Mohsen Abolqasemi, Ahmad Tafazzoli, Alireza Shapour Shahbazi, and Fereydoon Joneydi. During this period, Ali-Akbar Dehkhoda compiled the Loghat-nameh Persian dictionary.

== In Europe ==
=== Germany ===
Germany historically has one of the more prolific places for research and writings about Iran, outside of Iran itself. Iranian studies (German: Iranistik) in German-speaking countries goes as far back as 1654 AD and the publication of Golestan Saadi with translation by Adam Olearius. Classical Iranology in German began in the early nineteenth century with the research and writings of Georg Friedrich Grotefend.

Iran studies programs in Germany are at Freie Universität Berlin and the Georg-August-Universität Göttingen.

=== France ===
The emergence of comparative Indo-European linguistics and the translation of the Avesta happened in the late eighteenth century, by French scholar Abraham Hyacinthe Anquetil-Duperron.

Iranian studies programs in France are at the Institut National des Langues et Civilisations Orientales (Inalco), Université Sorbonne Nouvelle, École pratique des hautes études (EPHE-PSL), Université de Strasbourg, and the French National Centre for Scientific Research.

=== Sweden ===
The earliest recorded Swedish visitors to Iran were in the 17th century, with Bengt Bengtsson Oxenstierna (1591–1643) and Nils Matsson Kiöping (c. 1621–1680). However a Swedish gold coin from 1700s was found in an Iranian bazaar, which may indicate earlier contact between the cultures. Early Swedish scholars of Iranian studies included Nathan Söderblom (1866–1931), Henrik Samuel Nyberg (1889–1974), Geo Widengren (1907–1996), Stig Wikander (1908–1984), and Sven Hartman (1917–1988). Among contemporary Swedish Iranologists are Bo Utas (b. 1938), Carina Jahani (b. 1959), and Ashk Dahlén (b. 1972).

=== United Kingdom ===
A major European scholarly organization devoted to Iranian Studies is the Societas Iranologica Europaea, founded in 1981. The Iran Heritage Foundation was founded in 1995 and is based in London. They support Iranian studies at several universities and sponsors a wide range of public cultural events.

Other Iran studies programs in the United Kingdom are at the University of Cambridge, the British Institute of Persian Studies (BIPS), Durham University, University of Oxford, University of St Andrews, University of London, and the Library for Iranian Studies.

=== Other ===
There are Iran studies programs in the Austrian Academy of Sciences, Austria; Jagiellonian University, and Warsaw University in Poland; the University of Salamanca in Spain; and the Scandinavian Society for Iranian Studies (SSIS) at various locations in Scandinavia.

== In North America ==
=== United States ===
==== Columbia University ====
A. V. Williams Jackson was an early American scholar on Indo-European languages and worked as a Columbia University professor. Jackson was known for producing a grammar of the Avestan language. The monumental Encyclopedia Iranica project was started in 1985 and led by retired Columbia University professor, Ehsan Yarshater.

==== Harvard University ====
Richard N. Frye developed Iranian studies program in the 1950s at Harvard University in Cambridge, Massachusetts.

==== University of California, Los Angeles ====
An Iranian studies program was created at the University of California, Los Angeles (UCLA) in 1963 in the Department of Near Eastern Languages and Cultures (NELC) that was established by Wolf Leslau a few years before, in 1959. The doctoral program at UCLA is the largest program in North America, and was the home institution of Professor emeritus Hanns-Peter Schmidt who used to read Old Iranian and Old Indic (Indo-Iranistik), and is now led by M. Rahim Shayegan who also specializes in Ancient Iran.

In 2021, UCLA hosted an Indo-Persian Musical Confluence gathering, which spanned several days and was focused on the history between the sitar and setar instruments.

==== Other schools ====
During the Iranian Revolution (1978–1979) the American academic centers in Iran were closed and their assets seized. Over the past three decades since then, lack of funding and the difficulty of research travel to Iran have been major obstacles to Iranian Studies scholars that are based in North America.

Other universities in the United States where Iranian Studies classes are offered include the University of Chicago; Princeton University; Stanford University; Massachusetts Institute of Technology; the University of Arizona; the University of Oklahoma; the University of Maryland; the University of Michigan, Ann Arbor; Ohio State University; Quinnipiac University; University of Texas at Austin; University of Virginia; University of Washington; and Indiana University, Bloomington. Within the University of California system, programs in Iran Studies are taught at the University of California, Los Angeles, University of California, Irvine, and San Francisco State University.

The International Society for Iranian Studies (previously known as the Society for Iranian Studies) was founded by a group of Iranian graduate students in 1967 and began producing a journal, Iranian Studies. The field expanded considerably during the 1970s, with a number of Americans having served in the Peace Corps in Iran taking up academic positions. Close relations between Iran and the US facilitated the growth of academic programs as well as the Asia Institute in Shiraz and the American Institute of Iranian Studies.

=== Canada ===
The University of Toronto has an Iranian studies program. The Yarshater Lectureship in Avestan and Pahlavi Languages established at the University of Toronto is one of the most prestigious honor in the field.

In 2021, the University of Toronto partnered with the Encyclopaedia Iranica Foundation for a multiyear partnership to create the Iranian Women Poets and Iranian Cinema digital projects.

== Organizations ==
The American Institute of Iranian Studies (AIIrS) is a nonprofit founded in 1967, formed to promoted Iranian and Persian studies in American educational institutions. The Foundation for Iranian Studies is a nonprofit founded in 1981 in Bethesda, Maryland, and since 1982 they host an oral history program. The Ilex Foundation is a nonprofit organization founded in 1999 in Boston, Massachusetts, formed to study Mediterranean and Near Eastern civilizations.

The Iran Heritage Foundation (IHF) is a nonprofit founded in 1995 by Ali Ansari in the United Kingdom; and the parallel organization the Iran Heritage Foundation America is a nonprofit founded in 2010 in New York.

The Societas Iranologica Europaea (SIE) was founded in 1983 in Rome, with members from European and non-European countries. SIE works to promote and support Persian and Iranian philology, linguistics, literature, history, religions, art, archaeology, philosophy, ethnology, geography, human sciences, and jurisprudence.

== Notable scholars ==
- Iraj Afshar
- Mehrdad Bahar
- Mary Boyce
- Mahmoud Reza Eftekharzadeh
- Richard N. Frye
- Michael Axworthy
- Roman Ghirshman
- Michael Roaf
- James R. Russell
- Erich Schmidt
- Alireza Shapour Shahbazi
- David Stronach
- Ahmad Tafazzoli
- Ehsan Yarshater
- Abdolhossein Zarrinkoub

== Book series ==
- Iranian Studies (LIT Verlag)
- The Anthropology of Persianate Societies

== Journals and magazines ==
- Abstracta Iranica
- Acta Iranica
- Analytica Iranica
- Archäologische Mitteilungen aus Iran und Turan
- Ars Orientalis, from the Freer Gallery of Art and the University of Michigan
- Bukhara magazine
- DABIR
- Farhang-i Kerman
- Critique: Critical Middle Eastern Studies
- Indo-Iranica
- Indo-Iranian Journal
- Iran: Journal of the British Institute of Persian Studies
- Iran Analysis Quarterly (ISG Journal)
- Iranica Antiqua edited by Department of Near Eastern Studies of Gent University
- Iran and the Caucasus journal
- Iranian Studies journal
- Iran-nameh: Armenian Journal of Oriental Studies
- Iranshinakht
- Iranshenasi
- Iranica Antiqua journal
- Iranistische Mitteilungen
- The Journal of the Anthropology of the Contemporary Middle East and Central Eurasia (ACME)
- Namah-i Farhangistan
- Nowruz Journal
- Majallah-yi Zabanshinasi
- Manuscripta Orientalia (includes articles on Persian manuscripts)
- Namah-i Farhangistan
- Persica, from Jaarboek van het Genootschap Nederland-Iran
- Rahavard
- Studia Iranica
- Zabanshinas

== See also ==
- Armenian studies
- Assyriology
- Avestan studies
- Greater Iran
- Iranian languages
- Middle Eastern studies
- Persianization
- Persophilia
- Iranology Foundation
- Academy of Persian Language and Literature
- Encyclopædia Iranica
