= Homayoun Mazandi =

Iranian-born British socialite and philanthropist

Homayoun Mazandi, Lady Renwick (11 July 1939 – 5 July 2023) was an Iranian-born British socialite and philanthropist.

== Early life and career ==
Mazandi was born in Tehran, Iran, to Major Mahmoud Yazdanparast Pakzad and Nusrat al-Muluk. She briefly worked in television journalism.

Mazandi supported numerous charitable and cultural organizations. In the early 1990s, she helped establish the Iran Heritage Foundation in London and became a trustee. She served as chairwoman of the London committee for the British Special Olympics and, in 1993, founded Friends of Persian Art and Culture at Cambridge University, supporting academic publications about Iranian history.

From 2013, Mazandi was honorary ambassador for the philanthropic Nowruz Commission, promoting the ancient spring festival celebrated in Central Asia and Iran.

== Personal life ==
In 1960, Mazandi married Youssef (Joe) Mazandi and they had two children, Yassemine (Yassi) and Shariar. The Mazandi family resided in a Tehran residence designed by architect Frank Lloyd Wright.

In 1971, during the celebrations of the 2,500th anniversary of the Persian Empire in Persepolis, Homayoun was asked by representatives of Shah Mohammad Reza Pahlavi for advice due to her social connections, though she herself chose not to attend the event. She moved permanently to London in 1972 and divorced Mazandi in 1986. Both of her children attended boarding schools in England.

In 1989, Mazandi married Harry Andrew Renwick, 2nd Baron Renwick.
