= Royal Society of Arts and Sciences in Gothenburg =

The Royal Society of Arts and Sciences in Gothenburg (Swedish: Kungliga Vetenskaps- och Vitterhets-Samhället i Göteborg, abbreviated KVVS and often known simply as Samhället) is a Swedish Royal Academy. Its predecessor was founded in Gothenburg in 1773 and the academy took its present name in 1778. The same year, Gustav III of Sweden gave it Royal Charter.

== See also ==
- Vega expedition
