= Bruno Overlaet =

Belgian scholar and archeologist

Bruno Overlaet is a Belgian archaeologist and Professor of Ghent University. He is the Curator of the Iranian collection of the Royal Museums of Art and History, Brussels (Belgium). Overlaet is known for his works on Ancient Near East. He is a winner of the Farabi Award and is a co-editor of Iranica Antiqua.

== Works ==
- The Iron Age III Graveyard at War Kabud Pusht-i Kuh, Luristan, E. Haerinck, B. Overlaet, 1974
- Bani Surmah: An Early Bronze Age Graveyard in Pusht-i Kuh, E. Haerinck, B. Overlaet · 1974
- The Kalleh Nisar Bronze Age Graveyard in Pusht-i Kuh, Luristan, E. Haerinck, B. Overlaet · 1974
- The Iron Age III Graveyard at War Kabud (Chavar District), E. Haerinck, B. Overlaet · 2004
- The Early Iron Age in the Pusht-i Kuh, Luristan, B. Overlaet · 2003
- Chamahzi Mumah: An Iron Age III Graveyard, E. Haerinck, B. Overlaet · 1998
- Luristan Excavation Documents: Chamahzi Mumah, E. Haerinck, B. Overlaet · 1998
- Djub-i Gauhar and Gul Khanan Murdah, E. Haerinck, B. Overlaet · 1999
