= Iranica Antiqua =

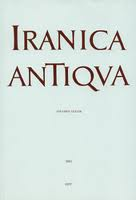
- Discipline: Archaeology, Oriental Studies, Iranian Studies
- Language: English
- Edited by: E. Haerinck, B. Overlaet

Publication details
- History: 1961-present
- Publisher: Peeters Publishers, Leuven (Belgium)
- Frequency: Annual

Standard abbreviations
- ISO 4: Iran. Antiq.

Indexing
- ISSN: 0021-0870 (print); 1783-1482 (web)

Links
- Journal homepage

Iranica Antiqua is a scholarly journal publishing papers on ancient Iran in its broadest sense. The journal was established by Iranist Roman Ghirshman and Louis Vanden Berghe in 1961. The journal is edited by Prof. Bruno Overlaet, Jan Tavernier, and Elynn Gorris. Articles are in French, English or German.

According to its official website, the journal publishes different articles such as preliminary excavation reports, contributions on archaeological problems, studies on different aspects of history, institutions, religion, epigraphy, numismatics and history of art of ancient Iran, as well as on cultural exchanges and relations between Iran and its neighbours.

Iranica Antiqua is abstracted and indexed in the Arts and Humanities Citation Index and Current Contents/Arts & Humanities, Linguistic Bibliography, Index Islamicus, Scopus, INIST/CNRS, Crossref, Thomson Scientific links.

Supplement series : The aim of this series is to provide an opportunity for publication of more substantial works of monograph length and collective works on particular themes.

== See also ==
- Encyclopaedia Iranica
- Iranian studies
