= Anna-Maja Nylén =

Swedish ethnologist (1912–1976)

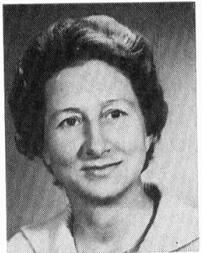
- Born: 24 March 1912; Dalby parish
- Died: 27 February 1976 (aged 63); Lidingö
- Occupation: Ethnologist

Anna-Maja Nylén (March 24, 1912 – February 27, 1976) was a Swedish ethnologist.

== Birth and family ==
Nylén was born on March 24, 1912, in Dalby parish in northern Värmland. Her parents were Johanna Theresia Nylén (birth name Hägglund), and Jakob Theodor Nylén. She had a sister, Karin Laura Nylén, and two brothers, Jan Klas Nylén and Matts Otto Nylén. She never married.

== Career ==
Nylén worked at the Nordic Museum beginning in the late 1930s. She was the first academically qualified female employee there. In 1947, she became the first woman at the Nordic Museum to receive a doctorate in folklife research, which she received from the Institute for Folklife Research. In 1961, she became the head of the Nordic Museum's Etnologiska undersökningen (ethnological investigation section). In 1965, she became head of a recently created costumes and textiles section at the Nordic Museum. She worked in that section until she retired from the museum in 1975.

She also did work outside of the museum. In 1957, she became docent in ethnology at Uppsala University. In 1963, she became an instructor at Friends of Handicraft’s weaving school. Later, in 1969, her book Svensk hemslojd (in English Swedish Handcraft) was published; as of the year 2000, it was a standard work on pre-industrial craft.

In 1973, she became the first professionally-engaged woman elected to The Royal Gustavus Adolphus Academy for Swedish Folk Culture.

== Death ==
Nylén died in Lidingö on February 27, 1976.

== See also ==
- Wintzell, Inga. "Anna-Maja Nylén: 1912-1976", in Fataburen: Nordiska museets och Skansens årsbok, Stockholm: Nordiska museets förlag, 1976, p. 300-301.
- "Ideologer i olika tider : om Sophie Adlersparre, Stina Rodenstam och Anna-Maja Nylén" in Den feminina textilen : makt och mönster, 2005, Birgitta Svensson and Louise Waldén (editors), ISBN 9171084991
