= Bo Utas =

Swedish academic

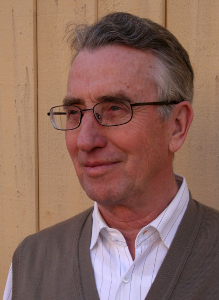
- Born: May 26, 1938 (age 88); Jämtland, Sweden
- Education: Uppsala University
- Occupation: Professor emeritus at Uppsala University
- Notable work: The Virgin and Her Lover: Fragments of an Ancient Greek Novel and a Persian Epic Poem (2003), Manuscript, Text and Literature: Collected Essays on Middle and New Persian Texts (2008), From Old to New Persian: Collected Essays (2013)
- Partner: Elizabeth Utas

Bo Utas, born May 26, 1938, in Höglunda, a village in Jämtland, Sweden, is a Swedish linguist, Iranologist and chess historian. He is professor emeritus in Iranian languages at Uppsala University, and a scholar on Persian historical linguistics and classical Persian literature.

== Career ==
Bo Utas got acquainted with Persian literature in secondary school. In 1959, he started to study Persian at Uppsala University for his mentor Henrik Samuel Nyberg and defended his PhD thesis in 1973. His thesis is a critical edition of the Sufi masnavi poem Tariq to-tahqiq which has been ascribed to Hakim Sanai of Ghazna. Utas travelled extensively in Iran and Afghanistan in the 1960s and 1970s. From 1988 he became the first professor in Iranian languages at Uppsala University, a chair that he held until he retired in 2003. Under his supervision, no less than eight PhD candidates defended their theses successfully.

Bo Utas is a member of several learned societies, including the Royal Danish Academy of Science and Letters, Societas Iranologica Europaea, and the Royal Society of the Humanities in Uppsala. He was the first secretary of the Societas Iranologica Europaea. He has twice been a Fellow at the Swedish Collegium for Advanced Study in Uppsala, Sweden (Spring 2001, Spring 2006).

Bo Utas knows several languages, including Avestan, Old Persian, Middle Persian, Sanskrit, Chinese, Russian, Greek, Latin, Turkish, Hebrew and Arabic.

A full list of his publications shows his broad and diverse scholarship on Middle Persian and New Persian language and literature, manuscript tradition and text edition, culture and religion in Greater Iran.

Bo Utas has translated several Persian classical and modern literary works into Swedish, including the Buf-e kur (Blind Owl) by Sadeq Hedayat.

Bo Utas collected essays on and translations of Persian literature in Swedish has been published with the title Persiska litteraturen: Essäer och översättningar and edited by his pupil Ashk Dahlén.

== Selected publications (in English) ==
- The Jewish-Persian fragment from Dandan-Uiliq, Orientalia Suecana 17, Uppsala, 1968.
- Tariq ut-tahqiq. A Sufi Mathnavi ascribed to Hakim Sana’i of Ghazna and probably composed by Ahmad b. al-Hasan b. Muhammad an-Naxcavani. A critical edition, with a history of the text and a commentary, Lund: Scandinavian Institute of Asian Studies, 1973.
- On the composition of the Ayyatkar i Zareran, Monumentum H.S. Nyberg II, (= Acta Iranica, 5), Tehran-Liège 1975.
- A Persian Sufi poem: vocabulary and terminology. Concordance, frequency word-list, statistical survey, Arabic loan-words and Sufi-religious terminology in Tariq ut-tahqiq (A.H. 744), London-Malmö: Scandinavian Institute of Asian Studies, 1978.
- Women in Islamic societies: social attitudes and historical perspectives, London-Malmö: Scandinavian Institute of Asian Studies, 1983.
- Verbal ideograms in the Frahang i Pahlavik, Middle Iranian Studies = Orientalia Lovanensia Analecta, Skalmowski-van Tongerloo (eds.), 16, Leuven 1984.
- Jang u asti: War and peace in Iran, in E. Kahrs (ed.), Kalyanamitraraganam. Essays in honour of Nils Simonsson, Oslo (The Institute for Comparative research in human culture) 1986.
- Frahang i Pahlavik, edited with transliteration, transcription and commentary from the posthumous papers of Henrik Samuel Nyberg, with the collaboration of Christopher Toll, Wiesbaden 1988.
- The Munajat or Ilahi-namah of ’Abdu’llah Ansari, Manuscripts of the Middle East, Leiden, 1988.
- New Persian as an interethnic medium, Ethnicity, minorities and cultural encounters, I. Svanberg (ed.), Uppsala 1991.
- Arabic and Iranian elements in New Persian prosody, Johanson, L. & Utas, B. (eds.), Arabic prosody and its applications in Muslim poetry, Stockholm: Swedish Research Institute in Istanbul, 1994.
- Traces of evidentiality in Classical New Persian, Evidentials: Turkic, Iranian and neighbouring languages, Johanson, L. & Utas, B. (eds.), Berlin & New York, 2000.
- Utas, B.; Hägg, T. (2004). The Virgin and her Lover: Fragments of an Ancient Greek Novel and a Persian Epic Poem. Brill Studies in Middle Eastern Literatures. Brill. ISBN 978-90-474-0258-9.
