= Iran: Journal of the British Institute of Persian Studies =

Iran
- Discipline: Iranian studies
- Language: English
- Edited by: C. Edmund Bosworth, Cameron A. Petrie

Publication details
- History: 1963-present
- Publisher: British Institute of Persian Studies (United Kingdom)
- Frequency: Annually

Standard abbreviations
- ISO 4: Iran (Lond.)

Indexing
- ISSN: 0578-6967
- LCCN: 64009404
- JSTOR: 05786967
- OCLC no.: 819189725

Links
- Journal homepage

Iran: Journal of the British Institute of Persian Studies is an annual peer-reviewed academic journal covering Iranian studies. Its first editor was Laurence Lockhart; other editors included Georgina Herrmann, C. Edmund Bosworth, Vesta Sarkhosh Curtis, and Cameron A. Petrie. It has been published in scholarship by Louis D. Levine, Inna Medvedskaya, Roger Moorey, Michael Roaf, T. Cuyler Young, and Ran Zadok among others.

== British Institute of Persian Studies ==
The journal is published by the British Institute of Persian Studies, an entity established in 1961 in Tehran as a "cultural institute, with emphasis on history and archaeology." Among its members: Basil Gray and Pirouz Mojtahedzadeh. The Institute also maintains a library.
