= Bengt Lidner =

Swedish poet

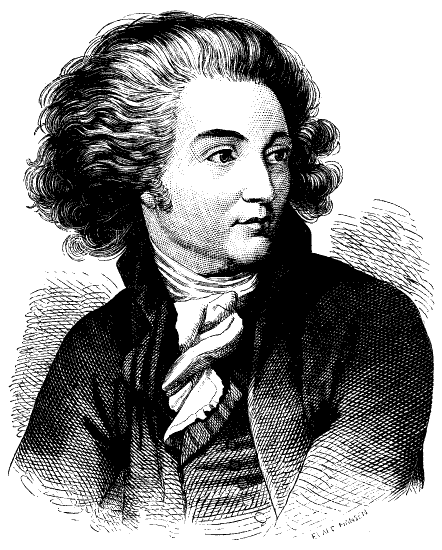
- Bengt Lidner
- Born: 16 March 1757; Gothenburg, Sweden
- Died: 4 January 1793 (aged 35); Stockholm, Sweden
- Occupation: poet

Bengt Lidner (March 16, 1757 – January 4, 1793) was a Swedish poet, born in Gothenburg. His opera Medea was translated to English and played in England during his lifetime, but wasn't played in Sweden until 2004.

His father died when he was 3, his mother when he was 14. In 1774, at age 17, he started studies at Lund University and produced two dissertations within two years, but was expelled just before presenting the second one. In 1776 he joined a ship of the Swedish East India Company from Gothenburg to China, but fled in Cape Town in April and in September he enlisted as a student of the University of Greifswald, which then was situated in Swedish Pomerania. There he wrote a dissertation on the justification of the American declaration of independence, but was told this subject was too sensitive, because of Sweden's diplomatic relation with Great Britain.

In 1779 he moved to Stockholm, where he started a career in literature. Despite a questionable reputation, he received a royal scholarship in 1780 and went to Göttingen in Germany, where he studied and lived beyond his means. From Göttingen he went to Paris, and returned to Stockholm in 1782. In 1787 he went to Finland and in 1788 married Eva Jacquette Hastfer, with whom he moved back to Stockholm the next year. In 1793 he died in poverty. The Swedish Academy in 1860 put a stone on his grave on the cemetery of Church of Adolf Fredrik in Stockholm.

Lidner's collected works have appeared (in Swedish) in many editions, most recently in the text critical edition of Svenska Vitterhetssamfundet in four volumes, 1930-1992.
