= Swedish Royal Academies =

Swedish art, culture and Science related Academy

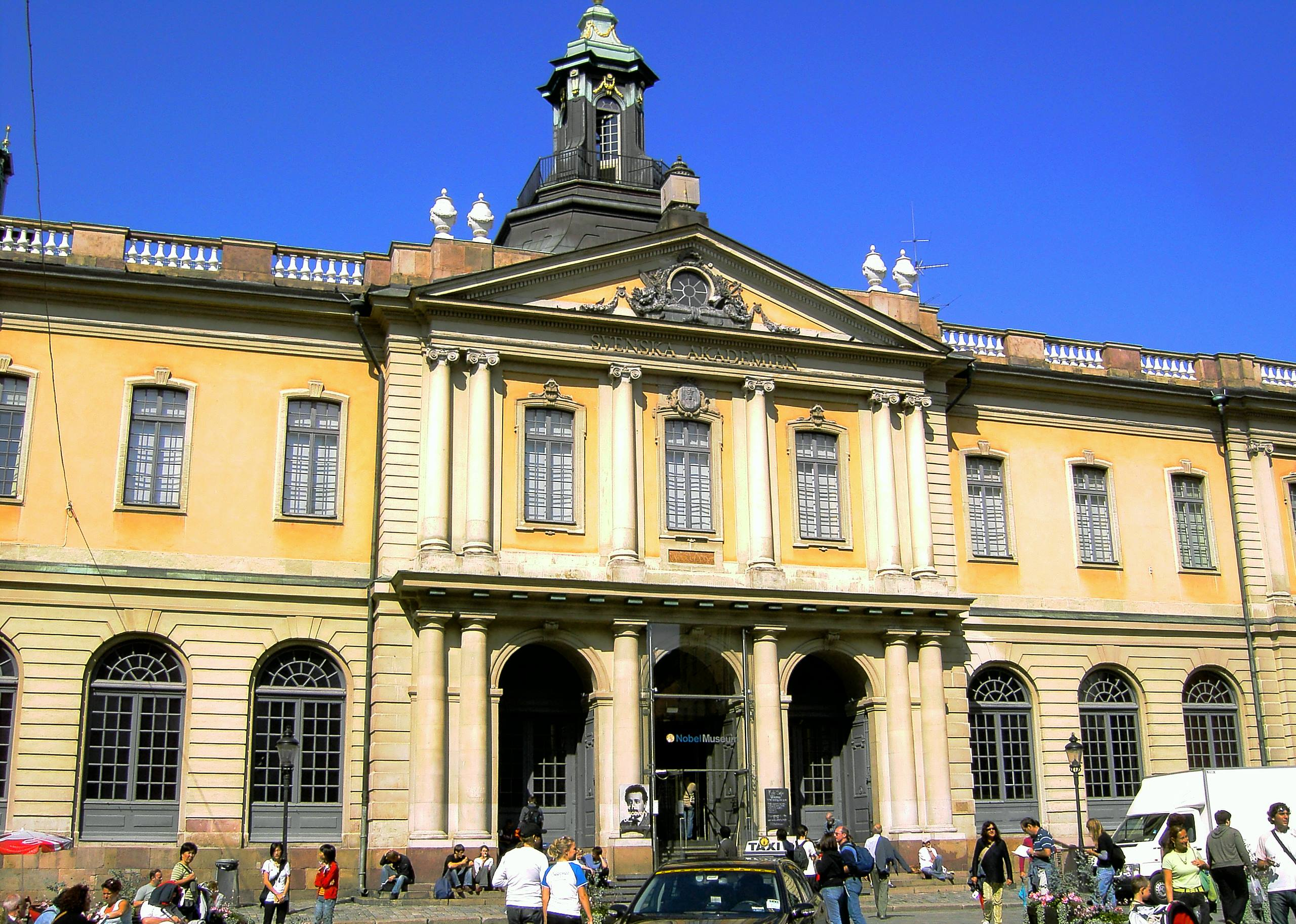
Swedish Stock Exchange building, home to the Swedish Academy

The Royal Academies are independent organizations, founded on Royal command, that act to promote the arts, culture, and science in Sweden. The Swedish Academy and Academy of Sciences are also responsible for the selection of Nobel Prize laureates in Literature, Physics, Chemistry, and the Prize in Economic Sciences. Also included in the Royal Academies are scientific societies that were granted Royal Charters.

== Arts and culture ==
- Swedish Academy (Svenska Akademien), 1786
- Royal Swedish Academy of Fine Arts (Kungliga Akademien för de Fria konsterna), 1773
- Royal Swedish Academy of Music (Kungl. Musikaliska Akademien), 1771
- Royal Swedish Academy of Letters, History and Antiquities (Kungl. Vitterhets-, Historie- och Antikvitetsakademien), 1753

== Sciences ==
- Royal Swedish Academy of Sciences (Kungl. Vetenskapsakademien), 1739
- Royal Swedish Academy of Engineering Sciences (Kungl. Ingenjörsvetenskapsakademien), 1919
- Royal Swedish Academy of Agriculture and Forestry (Kungl. Skogs- och Lantbruksakademien), 1813

== Military ==
- Royal Swedish Academy of War Sciences (Kungl. Krigsvetenskapsakademien), 1796
- Royal Swedish Society of Naval Sciences (Kungl. Örlogsmannasällskapet), 1771

== Societies with a royal charter ==
- Royal Society of Sciences in Uppsala (Kungl. Vetenskapssocieteten i Uppsala), 1710
- Royal Physiographic Society in Lund (Kungl. Fysiografiska Sällskapet i Lund), 1772
- Royal Society of Sciences and Letters in Gothenburg (Kungl. Vetenskaps- och Vitterhetssamhället i Göteborg), 1759
- Royal Society of the Humanities at Uppsala (Kungl. Humanistiska Vetenskaps-Samfundet i Uppsala), 1889
- Royal Society of the Humanities in Lund (Kungl. Humanistiska Vetenskapssamfundet i Lund), 1918
- Royal Gustavus Adolphus Academy in Uppsala (Kungl. Gustav Adolfs Akademien), 1932
- Royal Society of Arts and Sciences of Uppsala (Kungl. Vetenskapssamhället i Uppsala), 1954
- Royal Skyttean Society in Umeå (Kungl. Skytteanska Samfundet), 1956
