= Eric Hermelin =

Swedish writer (1860–1944)

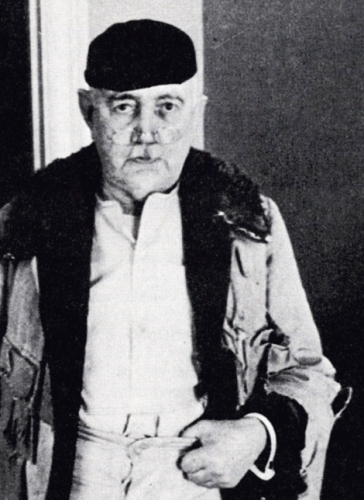
- Eric Hermelin in his sheepskin coat, ca. 1940
- Born: Eric Axel Hermelin; June 22, 1860; Svanshals, Sweden
- Died: November 8, 1944; Lund, Sweden
- Other name: Thomas Edward Hallan
- Education: University of Uppsala
- Known for: Translation of Persian literature
- Spouse: never married

Eric Axel Hermelin, Baron Hermelin (June 22, 1860 – November 8, 1944) was a Swedish author and prolific translator of Persian works of literature.

== Biography ==
Hermelin was born into an aristocratic family in Svanshals, Ödeshög Municipality, Östergötland County and had a traditional education, at the end of which he spent a couple of years at the Philosophical Faculty of the University of Uppsala, which he left without taking a degree. Already at this stage he seems to have developed a taste for alcohol, which later became an addiction, with drastic lifelong consequences. After an unsuccessful attempt at farming on a family estate, he began a wandering life abroad. In 1883 he went to the United States and eked out a living as a teacher, a carpenter, and a soldier, before returning to Europe in 1885. In 1886, he traveled to England and joined the British army as a soldier in the Middlesex Regiment (under the name of Thomas Edward Hallan). He went with his regiment to India in the following year. However, his army career in India proved a failure. He was much troubled by disease, and by then his drinking had developed into full-blown alcoholism, possibly in combination with the use of narcotic drugs. Nevertheless, he spent time on language studies, obviously in preparation for one of the language examinations that formed part of the British administrative system in India. He states that he learnt Hindustani (i.e., Urdu) and also started to learn Persian. There is, however, no record showing that he had passed any examination in these subjects. In later years he occasionally referred to his Indian "Monshi," and it is also likely that he had his first encounters with Sufism at that time. In April 1893 he was finally discharged from the army "with ignominy," i.e., for disciplinary reasons. After that he became an even more intrepid traveler, going to England and America (including Jamaica) and then back to Sweden, where he again tried his hand at farming. His aristocratic family found his alcoholism and disorderly life unacceptable and had him declared officially unfit to manage his life, and in 1897 he was placed under the care of a guardian. Regardless of this injunction, he went abroad again and lived in Australia and, possibly, America, earning a living through sundry occupations. He turned up in London in the autumn of 1907 and returned to Sweden in early 1908. In the autumn of the same year he was taken into a lunatic asylum in Stockholm, and in February 1909 he was moved to the asylum of St. Lars in Lund, where he spent the rest of his life. He never married.

== Writing works ==
There is no concrete evidence of any literary production from his years of travel, but he turned to reading and writing when he was confined to the asylum in Lund. He began as a conservative and patriotic writer of verses, commentaries, and translations in local daily newspapers; but through his reading of, among others, the English socialist Robert Blatchford, he gradually adopted a more liberal and even radical attitude. Soon he was attracted by mysticism, first of all by Emanuel Swedenborg, whose works he started to translate. Then he turned to the Christian quietism and mysticism of Jakob Böhme, who remained one of his main inspirations. In this context he resumed his Persian studies and also started to learn Hebrew. Against all odds, with repeated lapses into alcoholism and deep depressions, he began a new career as an author and translator. His first publication (Uppsala, 1913) was a Swedish translation of an English work by Alexander Whyte on Jakob Böhme. In 1918 two volumes of translations from works by Böhme appeared in print, and the same year saw his first publication of a Swedish translation from Persian, the Bustan of Sa'di, possibly first encountered by him when he was preparing for his Persian examination in India some thirty years earlier. It was the first in a long series of Persian translations of classical Persian literature by his hand.

In the period 1918-43 he published no less than 23 volumes, altogether more than 8000 pages, of such translations. After the Golestan came an anthology of robaiyyat and mathnawiyyat, then Shabestari's Golshan-e raz, the Robaiyyyat of Khayyam, an abridged version of Sana'i's Hadiqat al Haqiqa and the Anwar-e sohayli of Wa'ez Kashefi. However, the greatest achievement of Hermelin was his translation of works by Farid al-din 'Attar and Jalal-al-Din Rumi. Both Farid al-din 'Attar's Pand-nama and his Manteq al-tayr appeared in print in 1929, his Tazkerat al-awlia in four volumes in 1931-43, and the Masnawi of Jalal al-Din Rumi in six volumes in 1933-39. In between he also published translations of excerpts from the Shah-nama and the full texts of the Kalila o Demna and Nizami's Eskandar-nama.

Thanks to Hermelin's prodigious output, there were already in the 1940s more translations of classical Persian literature available in Swedish than in most other European languages. The impact of these translations was, however, fairly limited. As a patient in a lunatic asylum, he remained a marginal figure, and most of his translations were printed privately, paid for by the family. Furthermore, he had an old-fashioned, and at times even odd and idiosyncratic, style in Swedish. He made liberal use of capitals for emphasis and excelled in some quasi-etymological erroneous conjectures (such as substituting 'Omr ("life") for 'Omar Khayyam). On the whole however, his translations are reliable and exact, only occasionally misinterpreting phraseology not easily found in the standard works of reference available to him (Salemann-Zhukovski's Grammar and Francis Joseph Steingass's Dictionary, etc.). At times his style acquires a strong and original, even prophetic, ring that made it especially attractive to poets and writers, such as Vilhelm Ekelund, Hjalmar Gullberg and Gunnar Ekelöf. Similarly, the very personal kind of mysticism that he developed through the years has had more impact as a literary model than as an exegesis of Sufism. His work strikes a grandiose but solitary chord in Swedish writing and Persian scholarship of the 20th century.

In 1943 Eric Hermelin received the Imperial Order of the Lion and the Sun from Masud Ansari, the representative of the Shah of Iran, Mohammad Reza Pahlavi, in Stockholm.

== Film about Eric Hermelin ==
In 2018 Swedish Television program "K Special" broadcast a one hour film on Eric Hermelin by the Swedish-Iranian film director Ali Boriri. The film entitled "Sufismen och Eric Hermelin" explores Hermelin's biography, translations of Persian literature as well as his views on literature, religion and politics, and contains interviews with Carl-Göran Ekerwald, Ashk Dahlén, Johan Hermelin och Marika Lagercrantz.

== See also ==
- Persian literature
- Sufism
