= Carl August Ehrensvärd =

Swedish naval officer, painter, author, and neo-classical architect (1745–1800)

Count Carl August Ehrensvärd
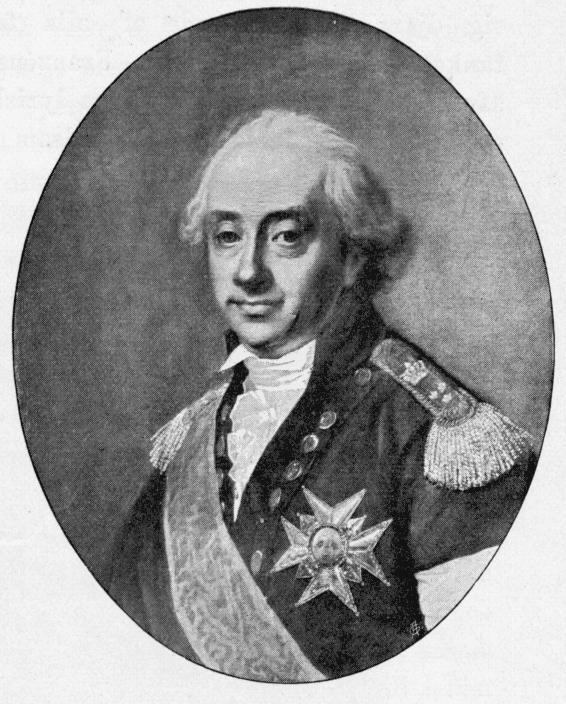
- Born: 5 May 1745; Stockholm, Sweden
- Died: 21 May 1800 (aged 55); Örebro, Sweden
- Relatives: Augustin Ehrensvärd (father); Albert Ehrensvärd (grandson)
- Military career
- Branch: Swedish Navy
- Service years: 1753–1794
- Rank: General admiral
- Commands: Archipelago fleet (1784–88)
- Conflicts: Pomeranian War; Russo-Swedish War; First Battle of Svensksund

Count Carl August Ehrensvärd (5 May 1745 – 21 May 1800) was a Swedish naval officer, painter, author, and neo-classical architect.

Ehrensvärd was born in Stockholm, and died in Örebro. Though active as a naval officer during his entire life, he is mostly remembered for the burlesque caricatures of often famous people from his era with which he decorated his letters. Some of his writings were published by Svenska Vitterhetssamfundet.

In 1790, he was elected a member of the Royal Swedish Academy of Sciences.

== See also ==
- Johan Tobias Sergel
- Carl Michael Bellman
