= Henrik Samuel Nyberg =

Swedish academic (1889–1974)

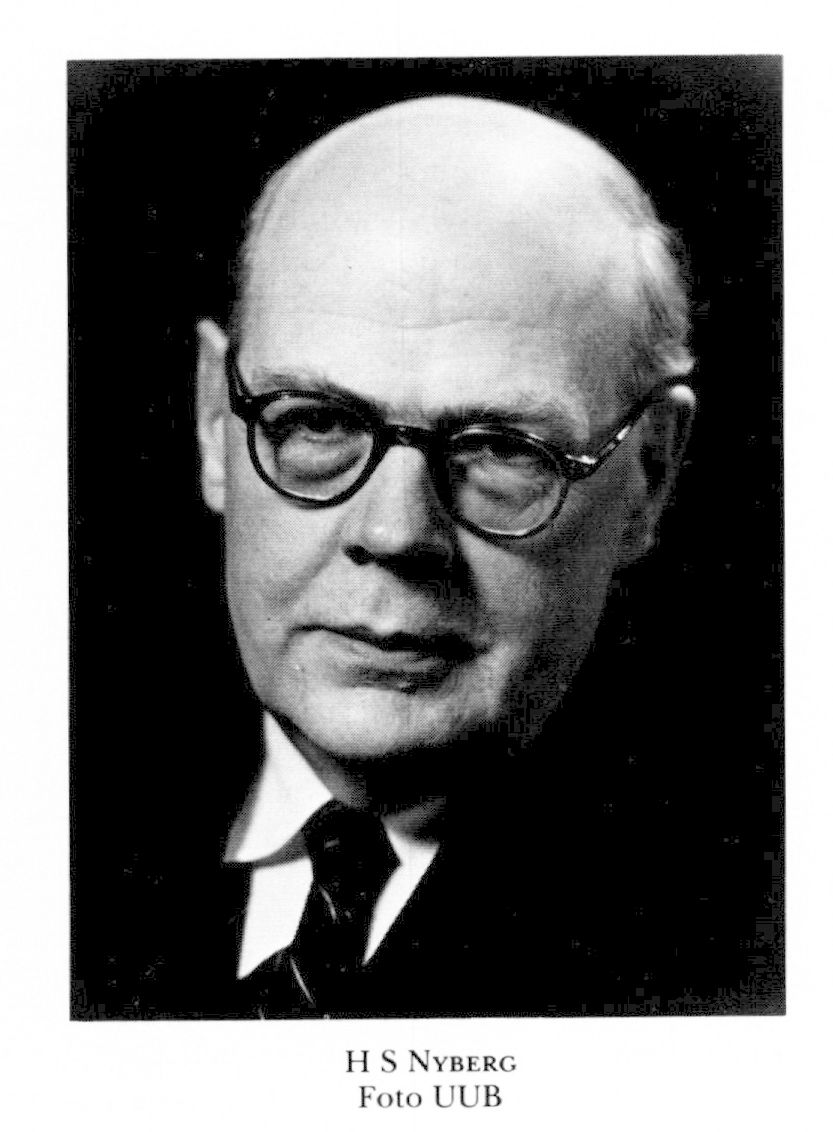
- H.S. Nyberg in 1948
- Born: 28 December 1889; Dalecarlia, Sweden
- Died: 9 February 1974 (aged 84); Uppsala, Sweden
- Education: Uppsala University
- Occupation: Professor of Semitic languages at Uppsala University
- Spouses: Fanny Helena Maria Hasselberg (m. 1920; died 1947) Ingegerd Maria Duske (m. 1950; died 1953)
- Children: Ingegerd Fries; Sigrid Kahle

Member of the Swedish Academy (Seat No. 3)
- In office 20 December 1948 – 9 February 1974
- Preceded by: Henrik Schück
- Succeeded by: Carl Ivar Ståhle

Henrik Samuel (H.S.) Nyberg (28 December 1889 – 9 February 1974) was a Swedish scholar of broad interest and a well known expert of Iranology and Arab studies.

== Life ==
Nyberg was born in Söderbärke in Southern Dalecarlia (Sweden) on 28 December 1889. When he was 19, he moved to Uppsala to undertake university courses. There, he studied from Classical languages to Sanskrit and to the Semitic idioms. Nyberg set up the Middle Persian curriculum as a possible subject of study at the University of Uppsala and he felt the need for teaching it by meeting Western scholarly standards. Nyberg’s single most important contribution to the study of Iranian religions is his Irans forntida religioner (1937). Overall, Nyberg was a scholar of extremely broad interests, competent in a number of different fields, both in Semitic and Iranian studies. He taught at the Fjellstedt School and Uppsala University.

He was a member of the Royal Swedish Academy of Sciences from 1943, and of the Swedish Academy (on seat number 3) from 1948.

Nyberg had many distinguished students in Iranian Studies, among them Geo Widengren, Stig Wikander, Sven S. Hartman, and Bo Utas. His daughters were the language scholar (Icelandic) and translator Ingegerd Fries and journalist, travel author and Orientalist Sigrid Kahle. Kahle married John Kahle, a West German diplomat and son of Paul Kahle, while Fries married Sigurd Fries, great-grandson of renowned Swedish mycologist Elias Fries.

== Works ==
- Kitāb al-Intiṣār by al-Khayyāṭ
- Frahang ī Pahlavīg (The Middle Iranian dictionary of ideograms)

Cultural offices
| Preceded by Henrik Schück | Swedish Academy, Seat No. 3; 1948-1974 | Succeeded by Carl Ivar Ståhle |
