= Sture Allén =

Swedish linguistics professor (1928–2022)

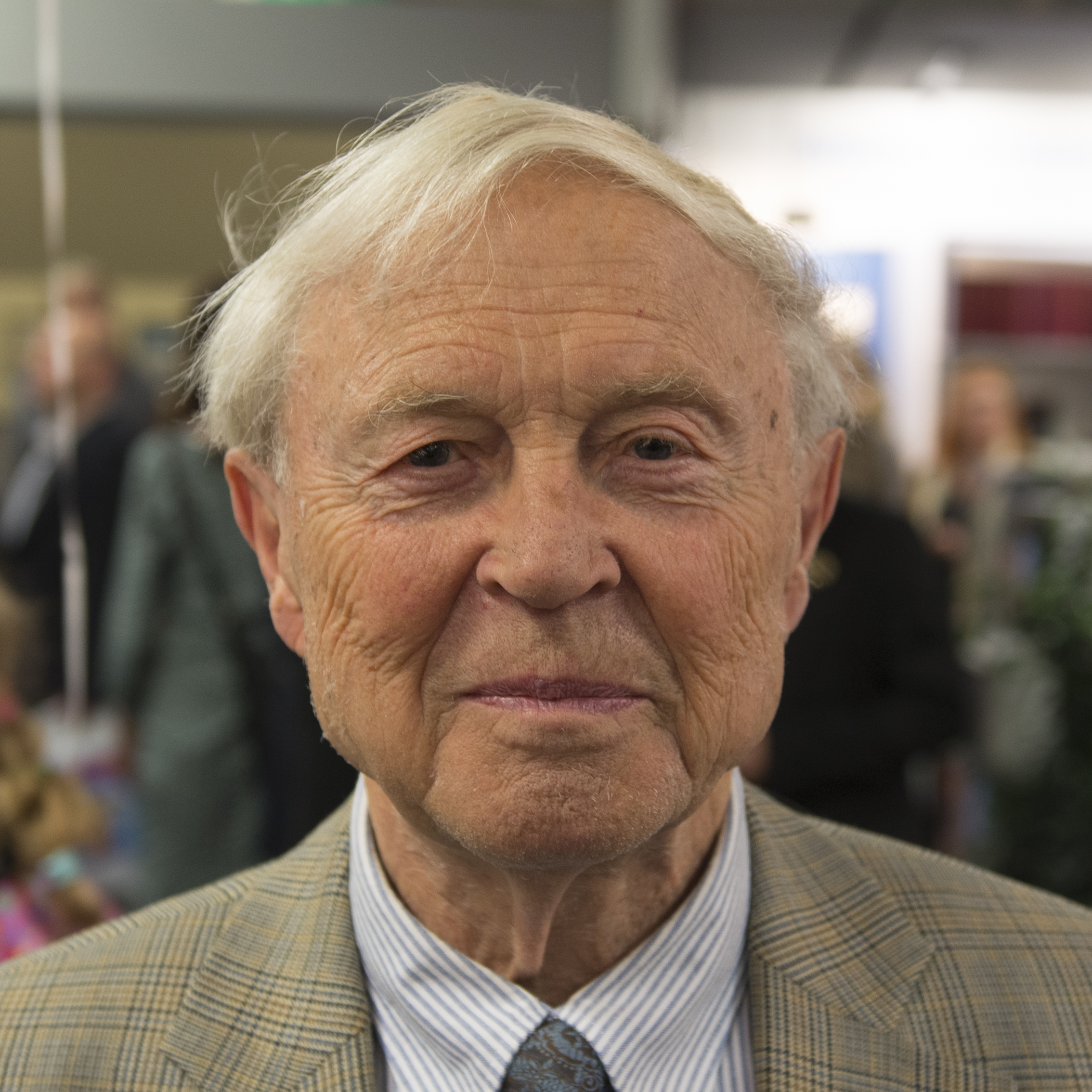
- Allén at the Gothenburg Book Fair in 2013
- Born: 31 December 1928; Lundby Old Church Parish, Gothenburg, Sweden
- Died: 20 June 2022 (aged 93); Stockholm, Sweden
- Education: University of Gothenburg
- Occupations: Linguist; Professor of Computational linguistics at University of Gothenburg
- Spouse: Solveig Jansson (m. 1954)

Member of the Swedish Academy (Seat No. 3)
- In office 20 December 1980 – 20 June 2022
- Preceded by: Carl Ivar Ståhle
- Succeeded by: David Håkansson

Permanent Secretary of the Swedish Academy
- In office June 1986 – June 1999
- Preceded by: Lars Gyllensten
- Succeeded by: Horace Engdahl

Sture Allén (31 December 1928 – 20 June 2022) was a Swedish professor of computational linguistics at the University of Gothenburg, who was the permanent secretary of the Swedish Academy between 1986 and 1999. Born in Gothenburg, he was elected to chair 3 of the Swedish Academy in 1980. He was also a member of the Norwegian Academy of Science and Letters and the Finnish Society of Sciences and Letters.

== Bibliography ==
- Grafematisk analys som grundval för textedering : med särskild hänsyn till Johan Ekeblads brev till brodern Claes Ekeblad 1639–1655 (1965)
- Tiotusen i topp : ordfrekvenser i tidningstext (1972)
- Carl Ivar Ståhle : inträdestal i Svenska akademien (1980)
- Svenska Akademien och Svenska Språket : tre Studier (1986)
- Orden speglar samhället (1989); co-authors: Martin Gellerstam & Sven-Göran Malmgren
- Som ett lejon med kluven svans (1993)
- Modersmålet i fäderneslandet : ett urval uppsatser under fyrtio år (1999)
- Nobelpriset i litteratur : en introduktion (2001); co-author: Kjell Espmark
- Johan Ekeblad : vår man i 1600-talet (2006)
- Svensk ordlista (2008)
- Stadgar för Svenska Akademien (2012)
- Nobelpriset i litteratur : En introduktion (2014)

Cultural offices
Preceded by Carl Ivar Ståhle	Swedish Academy, Seat No.3; 1980–2022	Succeeded by vacant
