= Bani Surmah =

Sumerian necropolis

- Geolocation on the map: Iran

- Location within Iran

Religion
- Province: Pusht-i Kuh

Location
- Location: Ilam, Iran

Bani Surmah is a late Sumerian necropolis, located on a plateau of Pusht-i Kuh, in the heart of central Zagros, Iran. It was studied for the first time in 1967 by a Belgian expedition, on behalf of the Royal Museums of Art and History of Brussels and the Ghent University. Its excavations have brought to light bronze furniture buried and still can be found in this area.

== Historical background of Loristan ==
During antiquity, most of the Putsht-I Kush was inhabited by nomads or semi-nomads, although small villages also exist. The cemeteries unearthed by the excavations, no doubt placed not far from their temporary camps, date back to the 5th millennium to the 3rd century BC. At the time of the construction of Bani Surmah, the peoples of the region are the Gutis, the Lullubi and the Elamites, probably at the origin of these family vaults, although the absence of written texts complicate the validation of this hypothesis.

== Description of the site ==
After two campaigns devoted to the necropolis of War-Kabud, the Belgian archaeological mission led by Louis Vanden Berghe continued its efforts from October 15 to December 12, 1967, on the necropolis of Bani Surmah, near the village of Chavar, in the district of Ilam and the province of Pusht-i Kuh.

Bani Surmah The thirty-seven funerary vaults, spread over three zones corresponding to the depressions of the plateau, measure, in their majority, from 8 to 16.2 meters in length for 1.7 to 3 meters in width and 1.5 to 2.1 meters depth. Closed by imposing stone slabs, the size of the graves indicates family or collective use. The comparison with the other sites makes it possible to establish that the burials of Bani Surmah were built between 2600 and 2500 BC. In terms of time, Louis Van den Berghe does not fully document the beads, and even some of them are related to ceramic tiles, for example.

== Funeral Furniture ==
Making up most of the objects found in the vaults, the ceramic remains include common tableware and painted pottery, such as reddish-brown painted vases decorated with geometric patterns. Awls, punches, adzes, spears, cups, bowls and jewelry, the objects of Bani Surmah show the appearance of the bronze civilization in Lorestan. The most common of them, the socketed axe, was used for both domestic and military purposes.

Jewellery, including rings, beads and necklaces, is adorned with shell fossils or precious stones. Cylindrical seals, decorated with greater or lesser finesse, are characteristic of the end of the ancient Sumerian period.

The relatively small number of funerary objects makes it impossible to compare the graves according to social status. Many resemble Mesopotamian remains, such as those at Susa, and the lack of copper ores in the region and indications of the craftsmanship of these inhabitants at this time suggest trade between Mesopotamia and Luristan, rather than a local production.
