= Royal Skyttean Society =

Seal of the Royal Skyttean Society

The Royal Skyttean Society (Swedish: Kungliga Skytteanska Samfundet) is a scholarly and scientific academy with its seat in the northern Swedish university town of Umeå. It is one of the 18 Royal Academies in Sweden and was founded on 29 April 1956, taking its name from the 17th century political figure Johan Skytte, who, among other things, contributed to education in Norrland through his initiative of founding a school in Lycksele. The society received royal patronage two years after its founding, and the status of a royal academy in 1967.

The society has 90 members, excepting those who have reached the age of 70.

The Skyttean Society publishes a publication series, Kungl. Skytteanska samfundets handlingar (since 1961), and a yearbook titled Thule. Kungl. Skytteanska samfundets årsbok (since 1988), and since 2007 the English-, French- and German-language Journal of Northern Studies.
