= Acta Iranica =

- Discipline: History
- Language: English
- Edited by: Ernie Haerinck

Publication details
- History: 1974–present
- Publisher: Brill Publishers

Standard abbreviations
- ISO 4: Acta Iran.

Indexing
- ISSN: 0378-4215
- OCLC no.: 920384786

Links
- Journal homepage

Acta Iranica is a periodical on Iranian studies published mainly in French, English, and German.

The English translation of the French undertitle of this periodical reads: The Permanent Encyclopedia of Iranian Studies published by an International Committee of scholars of the Chair of Indo-Iranian studies at the University of Liège'. Its chief editor was Jacques Duchesne-Guillemin.

Acta Iranica is a peer-reviewed series and is published by E. J. Brill in Leiden, the Netherlands.

Its scope covers scholarly studies of topics in the art, archaeology, ancient history and linguistics of the Iranian region.

The following types of material have been solicited for Acta Iranica: Texts of papers delivered at congresses of Iranology, new articles (especially those considered too lengthy for journals), opera minora of great Iranologists, and reprinted editions of selected works on Iranology.

The Second International Congress of Iranology at Shiraz in 1971 provided the impetus for the creation of Acta Iranica.

== Sources ==
- Root, Margaret Cool (1979). "Reviewed work: Acta Iranica: Encyclopédie permanente des études iraniennes, J. Duchesne-Guillemin". Journal of Near Eastern Studies. 38 (1): 39–42. doi:10.1086/372693. JSTOR 544573.
