= Royal Society of Arts and Sciences of Uppsala =

The Royal Society of Arts and Sciences of Uppsala (Swedish: Kungliga Vetenskapssamhället i Uppsala), is a Swedish royal academy in Uppsala. The society was founded on 8 October 1954 and received a royal charter in 1957.
