= Cyriades =

Roman rebel who tried to overthrow emperor Gallienus

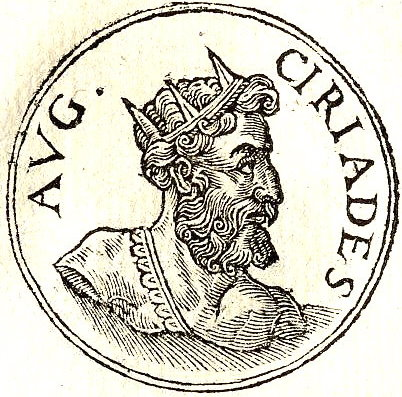
Imaginary portrait of Cyriades from Promptuarii Iconum Insigniorum (1553)

Cyriades (referred to in other sources as Mareades or Mariades or Mariadnes) was a Roman rebel who betrayed the city of Antioch to the Sasanian King Shapur I sometime during the 250s. His chief claim to fame is that he is enumerated as one of the Thirty Tyrants who supposedly tried to overthrow the emperor Gallienus.

== The Historia Augusta ==
Cyriades is listed first in the catalogue of usurpers that comprise the chapter on the Thirty Tyrants within the notoriously unreliable Historia Augusta (and writing under the fictitious name of Trebellius Pollio), whose narrative is brief, indistinct, and largely inaccurate. According to this source, Cyriades was the son of a rich man, also named Cyriades, and whose debauched lifestyle offended his father. After stealing from his father, he fled to the Persians, stimulated Shapur I to invade the eastern Roman provinces and helped in the capture of Antioch and Caesarea. At this point he assumed the purple together with the title of Augustus, possibly killing his father before being slain by his own followers after a short, cruel and crime-filled reign.

The Historia Augusta dates this as occurring when the emperor Valerian was on his way to the east to fight the Persians, so the traditional assumption is that the date of this rebellion was 259. Edward Gibbon instead dated the usurpation as occurring after the defeat and capture of Valerian in 260.

== Other sources ==
The events of the Persian invasion of the east are also mentioned by other sources, but they attribute the fall of Antioch to the intrigues of an individual named Mareades or Mariades or Mariadnes, none of whom claimed the imperial dignity.

Ammianus Marcellinus mentioned that during the attack on Antioch during the reign of Gallienus, "Mareades, who had inconsiderately brought the Persians there to the destruction of his own people, was burned alive." Outside of the reference to Gallienus' reign, Ammianus Marcellinus does not date this event, but some scholars date this to 256.

The Anonymous Continuator of Cassius Dio refers to a Mariadnes, and describes the same event, but with some variations. Firstly, the people of Antioch were aware of the upcoming invasion, and that a large part of the population of Antioch remained in the city, being well-disposed toward Mariadnes and also favouring a change from the Romans to the Persians. Since this part of the work immediately precedes a section on the approaching formal recognition of Aemilianus as Augustus in 253, its author set the event described therein in the early 250s. This date, and the fall of Antioch occurring during the reign of Trebonianus Gallus, is favoured by a number of modern scholars.

Finally, according to John Malalas, during Valerian's reign, Mariades, one of the officials of Antioch, was expelled from the city council on charges of embezzlement. He was responsible for the running of the chariot races, had not bought the horses for one of the factions, and had stolen money that had been set aside for the Hippodrome. As a result, he fled to Persia, and in an interview with Shapur I, agreed to betray Antioch to the Persians. After the capture of the city, which was plundered and burnt to the ground, Shapur had Mariades beheaded as he was a traitor to his own people. Although John Malalas dates this event to 265/6, his narrative also implies that it occurred around 252/3.

It is now accepted that Cyriades and Mariades are one and the same person. One possibility is that the name Cyriades is a Hellenized version of the Aramaic name Maryad'a ("My Lord Knows"), with CYRI the Latin transliteration of the Greek KYPI ("Lord"). This may give rise to the claim made in the Historia Augusta that Cyriades was firstly made Caesar and then Augustus, as KYPI could be used for the holder of either title.

There is no numismatic and epigraphic evidence that Cyriades (or Mariades) was ever proclaimed Augustus. The coins published by Groltzius and Mediobarbus are rejected by numismatists as unquestionably spurious.
