= Sigrid Kahle =

Swedish journalist and writer

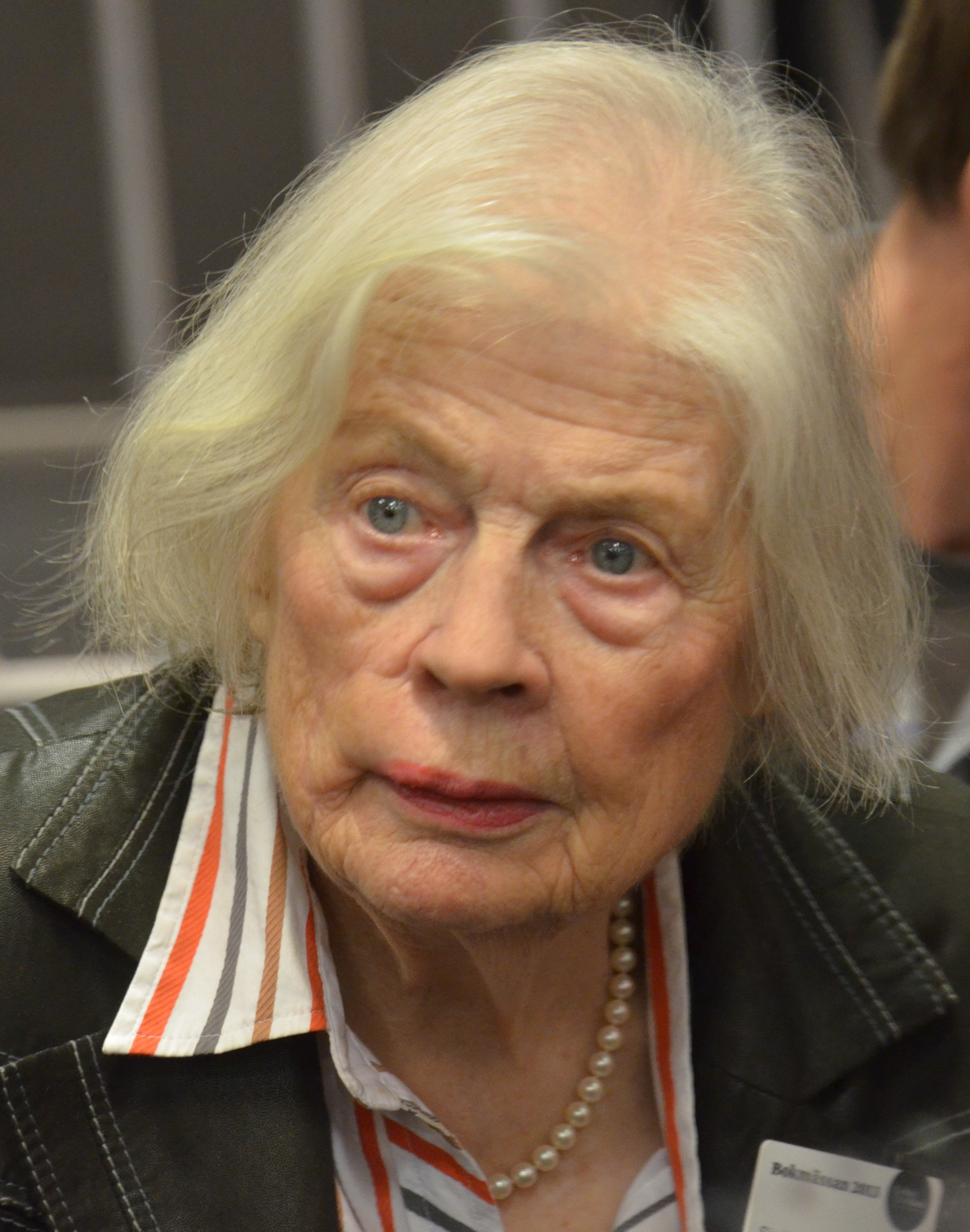
- Sigrid Kahle in September 2013.
- Born: Sigrid Ida Matilda Nyberg; 18 November 1928; Paris, France
- Died: 31 December 2013 (aged 85); Uppsala, Sweden
- Other name: Sigrid Nyberg
- Occupations: Journalist, writer
- Spouse: John H. Kahle (m. 1951)
- Relatives: H.S. Nyberg (father)

Sigrid Ida Matilda Kahle (née Nyberg; 18 September 1928 – 31 December 2013) was a Swedish journalist and writer.

She was born in Paris in 1928, to the orientalist H.S. Nyberg and his wife Fanny, née Hasselberg. She grew up in Uppsala where her father was professor of Semitic languages.

In her youth, she was interested in the theatre and after graduating she applied to a drama school, but was not accepted. Instead, she enrolled at Uppsala university where she studied the history of literary drama.

She travelled to London together with her father in 1946, and stayed with him in the home of the German orientalist Paul E. Kahle who had escaped from Germany with his family in 1938, after they had become targets of Nazi persecution for helping Jewish friends and neighbours. One of the sons in the family, John Kahle, fell in love with Sigrid Nyberg and the couple corresponded for some time after she had returned to Sweden. When John Kahle had moved to Bonn and trained as a diplomat, the two got married, and Sigrid Kahle moved first to Germany and then to Karachi, Baghdad, Washington, DC, Tunis, and New Delhi, where John Kahle had diplomatic posts.

On May 30, 1997 Kahle received an honorary doctorate from the Faculty of Humanities at Uppsala University, Sweden

Sigrid Kahle died following a brief illness on 31 December 2013, aged 85, in Uppsala.
