= Geo Widengren =

Swedish historian and academic (1907–1996)

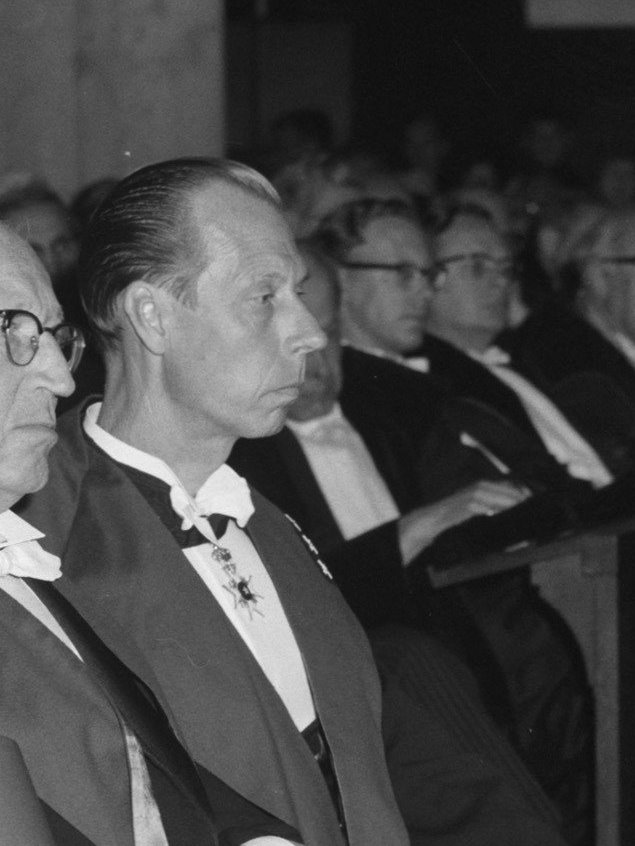
- Widengren at an honorary doctorate ceremony in Amsterdam, 1962.
- Born: April 24, 1907; Stockholm, Sweden
- Died: January 28, 1996 (aged 88); Sweden
- Known for: Studies on Iranian religions, Manichaeism, Zoroastrianism, Islam, Judaism, and Gnosticism

Academic background
- Education: Stockholm University, Uppsala University
- Doctoral advisor: Tor Andrae

Academic work
- Discipline: History of religions, Oriental studies, Iranian studies
- Institutions: Uppsala University
- Notable works: Die Religion Irans (1965), The Accadian and Hebrew Psalms of Lamentation as Religious Documents (1936)

Geo Widengren (24 April 1907 – 28 January 1996) was a Swedish historian of religions, professor of history of religions at Uppsala University, orientalist and Iranist.

Widengren wrote a series of works on Iranian religions (in particular Manicheism and Zoroastrism), Islam, Judaism, Gnosticism, etc. His most popular works include Die Religion Irans, published in 1965 (Les Religions de l'Iran, 1968).

Widengren has been considered "one of the most famous historians of religions of the twentieth century".

== Academic career ==
Geo Widengren was born and grew up in Stockholm. He did military service in the years 1925-27 and was appointed as a fähnrich at the Military Academy Karlberg. He participated as a volunteer in the Swedish Volunteer Corps in the Winter War.

Widengren studied history of religions at Stockholm University for his mentor Tor Andrae until 1933 and received his doctorate at the Faculty of Theology in Uppsala in 1936. His doctoral thesis was entitled "The Accadian and Hebrew Psalms of Lamentation as Religious Documents". In 1940 he became a professor of History of religions at the same faculty when he was only 33 years old.

Widengren was known for having mastered many languages, which gave him an advantage in the study of the frontiers of Asia during various eras. He had studied Assyriology in Copenhagen and Iranian Studies in Uppsala for H.S. Nyberg. He mastered, among other things, Greek, Latin, Armenian, Persian, and Arabic, as well as several older Iranian languages such as Avestan and Middle Persian.

Widengren was Vice President (1950–1960) and President (until 1970) of the International Association of the History of Religion. His pupil Anders Hultgård has published In memoriam Geo Widengren (1907–1996).

Widengren emphasized the Iranian influences on Judaism, Christianity and Mithraism. Religious scholars in the 1960s critiqued these themes, but he continued to defend the importance of Iranian influence throughout his career. Widengren's position was continued and developed in many works by Alessandro Bausani and Shaul Shaked.

== See also ==
- Stig Wikander

== Selected works ==
- Apocalyptique iranienne et dualisme qoumranien (in French). Paris. 1995.
- Der Mandäismus (in German). Darmstadt. 1982.
- Islam: past influence and present challenge, ed. (1979). The Pure Brethren and the Philosophical Structure of Their System. Edinburgh.
- The Gnostic Attitude. Santa Barbara. 1973.
- Religionens värld (in Swedish) (Omarbetad och utökad upplaga 1953, omarbetad och förkortad 1971 ed.). Stockholm. 1945.
- Religionsphänomenologie (in German). Berlin. 1969.
- Muhammed: hans liv och hans tro (in Swedish). Stockholm. 1967.
- Der Feudalismus im alten Iran: Männerbund, Gefolgswesen, Feudalismus in der iranischen Gesellschaft im Hinblick auf die indo-germanischen Verhältnisse (in German). Köln. 1969.
- Iranische Geisteswelt: von den Anfängen bis zum Islam (in German). Baden-Baden. 1961.
- Die Religionen Irans (in German). Stuttgart. 1965.
- Kungar, profeter och harlekiner: religionshistoriska uppsatser (in Swedish). Stockholm. 1961.
- Mani und der Manichäismus (in German) (English, 1965 ed.). Stuttgart. 1961.
- Ryttarfolken från öster: och andra artiklar (in Swedish). Stockholm. 1960.
- Muhammad, the Apostle of God, and His Ascension. Uppsala. 1955.
- The Great Vohu Manah and the Apostle of God: Studies in Iranian and Manichaean Religion. Uppsala. 1945.
- Hochgottglaube im alten Iran (in German). Uppsala. 1938.
