= Library for Iranian Studies =

Persian library in London, England

Coordinates: 51°30′27″N 0°16′31″W

Library for Iranian Studies is a major Persian library in Acton district of London, England. It has over 30,000 books in the Persian language, as well as English and other languages. The library receives no governmental funding and is voluntary controlled.

== Services ==
The main services of the Library include:

- Books, manuscripts, and CDs for reference and loan
- Persian newspapers and periodicals
- Free access to PCs including the Internet
- Enquiry services and community information
- Black and white photocopier
- Persian classes
- Lectures on different cultural, historical and social issues

At present there are over 30,000 cultural and political books and other publications for public use.

== History ==
The library was opened on November 16, 1991, with only 2,500 books in a rented premises. However, after financial support by members of the Iranian community in London the owners were able to purchase new premises which were opened to public on April 9, 1994.

== Activities ==
As well as being a centre for academic research on Iranian culture, politics and history, the library hosts range of classes to teach Persian language, as well as other events.
