= Erik Sjöberg (poet) =

Swedish poet (1794–1828)

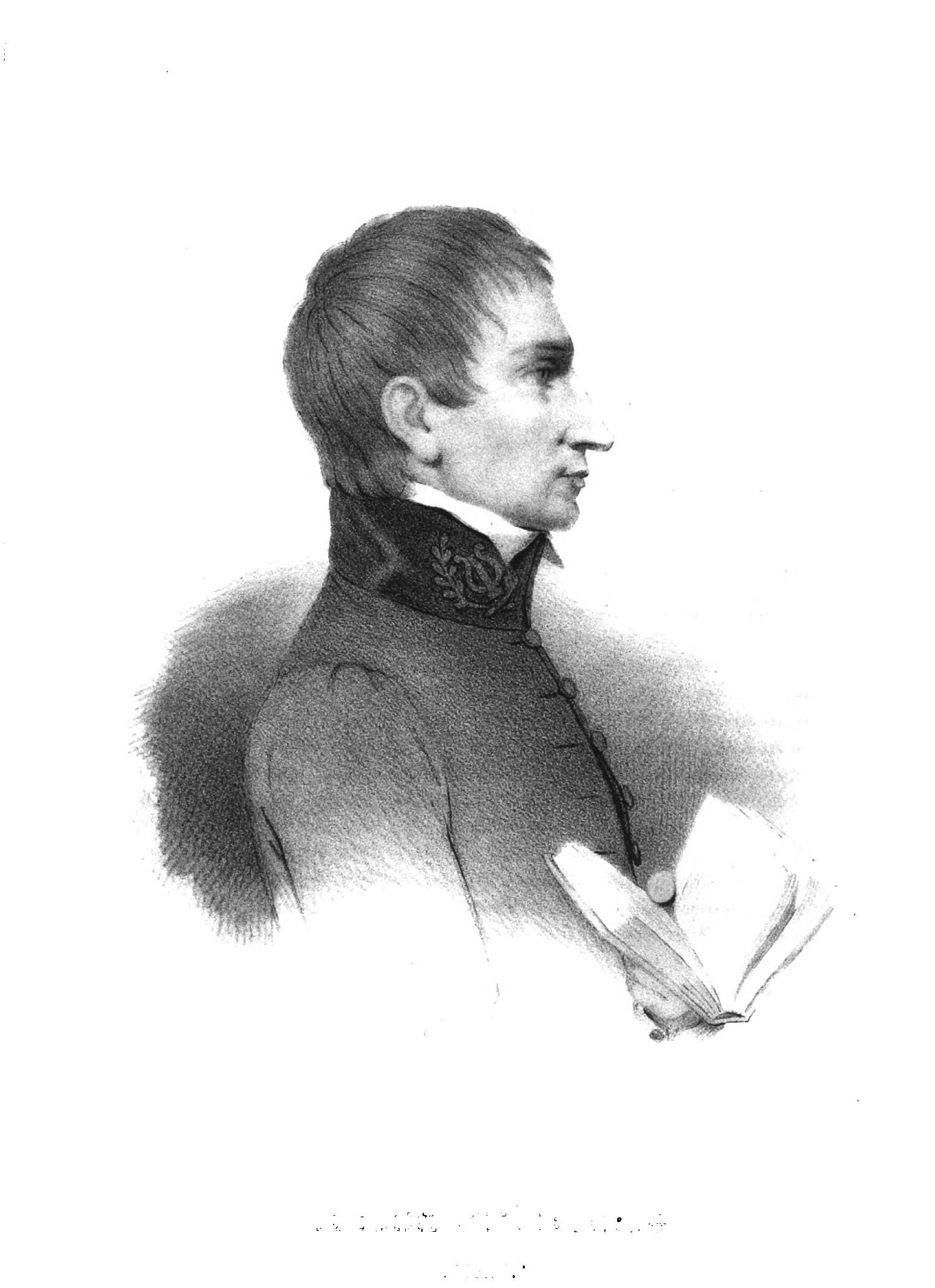
Erik Sjöberg (poet)

Erik Sjöberg (January 14, 1794 - March 4, 1828) was a Swedish poet. He wrote under the pseudonym Vitalis (which roughly means "life is a battle" in Latin).

Although he grew up in poor circumstances he studied at Uppsala University and got a Master of Arts degree. He mostly worked as private tutor while he was writing. His poetry was characterized by the ideals of romanticism, i.e. melancholy and spiritual ecstasy, but he also wrote many comical and satirical poems. Among his most widely known poems are Enslingens sång i den stora öknen ("The lonely man's song in the great desert") and Komiska fantasier ("Comical fantasies"). He is also represented in the 1986 official hymnbook of the Church of Sweden, with one hymn (no. 573). Sjöberg made translations of Thomas Moore and Washington Irving.

== Bibliography ==
- Dikter af Vitalis. Upsala, Em. Bruzelius. 1819. (in Swedish), Uppsala, 1819, LIBRIS=2428311
- Senare dikter af Vitalis. Upsala. Palmblad & c. =1-2. 1820.=. (in Swedish), Upsala, 1820, LIBRIS=2428313
- Nyare dikter af Vitalis. Stockholm, tryckta i Marquardska boktryckeriet, 1825. (in Swedish), Stockholm, 1825, LIBRIS=2428316
- Barndomsminnen (in Swedish), Stockholm, 1840, LIBRIS=10315563
- Samlade skrifter (in Swedish), Stockholm: Bonnier, 1873, LIBRIS=1586027 - Utg. af Carl Adolf Forselius, med företal af Erik Gustaf Geijer, och lefnadsteckning öfver förf. af utgifvaren.
- Några tankar och reflexioner (in Swedish), Norrköping: fören, 1908, LIBRIS=1619079
- Samlade skrifter, Svenska författare utgivna av Svenska vitterhetssamfundet, 0346-7864; 12 (in Swedish), Stockholm: Bonnier, 1926–1932, LIBRIS=114788 - Utg. av Algot Werin.

== Hymns ==
- Vi skulle jag ej möta glad min plåga (1937 nr 387). Bearbetad av Olle Nivenius Jag ber om hjälp till stillhet i min plåga (1986 nr 573)
- Min vän är ljuv, min vän är mild (1921 nr 586). Dikten Den bästa vännen skriven 1824
