= Iran Heritage Foundation =

Cultural preservation organization in London

The Iranian Heritage Foundation
- بنیاد میراث ایران
- Formation: 1990
- Type: Foundation, nonprofit Organization
- Headquarters: SOAS University of London, Thornhaugh Street, London, United Kingdom
- Location: London, United Kingdom
- Chairmen: Ali Rashidian; Alireza Rastegar
- Website: www.iranheritage.org

The Iran Heritage Foundation (IHF) is a United Kingdom–registered charity was founded in 1995 in London. The mission is to promote and preserve the history, languages and cultures of Iran and the Persianate world, covering all periods of Iranian civilization from ancient to modern.

== History and organisation ==
The Iran Heritage Foundation was founded in the UK in 1990 and registered as a charity in 1991 (no. 1001785). It is funded by contributions from individuals and corporations, and through various fundraising events. The Foundation does not accept financial support from any government organisations or lobbying groups. IHF is governed by a body of trustees supported by an advisory board and grant-giving committees.

The Iran Heritage Foundation seeks to promote and protect the cultural heritage of Iran, ancient, medieval and modern, in the most effective possible way. This is achieved through giving grants for academic and contemporary arts projects, supporting fellowships and internships at prestigious universities and museums, organising and sponsoring exhibitions, arranging seminars and conferences, organising monthly events at Asia House in London, and supporting many other kinds of activity, both in the United Kingdom and around the world.

=== Chairpersons and Director ===
- Co-Chairs
  - Ali Rashidian (2017–)
  - Alireza Rastegar (2017–)

=== IHF America ===
In 2010, IHF established an independent parallel organisation in New York state in the United States, known as IHF America. This organisation supported a curatorial post at the Freer Sackler gallery (now the Freer Gallery of Art) in Washington DC and played a major role in the British Museum's tour of the Cyrus Cylinder exhibition to five different United States museum venues in 2013.

== Object, remit ==
The remit of IHF is wide and includes archaeology, history, art history, literature, the performing arts, film, photography, music and contemporary art. IHF achieves its objectives by organising and supporting exhibitions, cultural events and conferences, giving grants, sponsoring publications, and supporting posts in universities and museums. Cultural/educational institutions that have been supported by IHF include the universities of Cambridge, Edinburgh, Exeter, London, Oxford, Reading, and St Andrews, and the British Library, the British Museum, the Courtauld Institute of Art, Tate Modern, and the Victoria & Albert Museum.

== Activities ==
The Foundation organises a regular series of events including lectures, panel discussions, performances, and film screenings. Major international conferences organised by IHF include: ‘Iran's Natural Heritage’ (2014); ‘From Persepolis to Isfahan: Safeguarding Cultural Heritage’ (2015), and two conferences on Tappeh Sialk and ancient Kashan (2017, 2018).

IHF also awards annual grants for academic and scholarly research as well as for contemporary and performing arts projects and festivals. These grants are awarded by two separate committees made up of external advisors.

IHF supports and sponsors events and activities which promote Iranian culture and history, including exhibitions such as ‘Forgotten Empire’ and ‘Shah Abbas’ at the British Museum] in 2005 and 2009. Additionally, the 2013 exhibition ‘The Cyrus Cylinder and Ancient Persia’, which toured around the US, was organised by the British Museum in partnership with the Iran Heritage Foundation and the Arthur M. Sackler Gallery. An ongoing major project supported by the IHF is the Golha Archive, an online digitized and fully indexed archive of the Golha radio programmes broadcast on Iranian radio station from 1956 until 1979.

== See also ==
- Iranian studies
