= Royal Gustavus Adolphus Academy =

Swedish royal academy dedicated to Swedish folklore

- Kungliga Gustav Adolfs Akademien
- Abbreviation: GAA
- Named after: Gustavus Adolphus
- Formation: November 6, 1932; 93 years ago
- Founder: Jöran Sahlgren and K.G. Westman
- Founded at: Uppsala University
- Type: Royal Academy of Sweden
- Purpose: Research and preservation of Swedish Folk Culture
- Headquarters: Klostergatan 2, Uppsala, Sweden
- Location: Uppsala, Uppland, Sweden
- Fields: Folklore and Culture
- Official language: Swedish
- Preses: Lars-Erik Edlund
- Affiliations: Monarchy of Sweden
- Website: https://gustavadolfsakademien.se/en

Seal of the Royal Gustavus Adolphus Academy

The Royal Gustavus Adolphus Academy (Swedish: Kungliga Gustav Adolfs Akademien) in Uppsala is one of 18 Swedish royal academies and dedicated to the study of Swedish folklore. Its name is often expanded to Kungl. Gustav Adolfs Akademien för svensk folkkultur ("...for Swedish Folk Culture").

The Academy was founded on 6 November 1932, on the occasion of the 300th anniversary of the death of King Gustavus Adolphus in the Battle of Lützen. It was initiated by the Professor of Nordic Languages, Jöran Sahlgren, and the first president was the historian and politician Karl Gustaf Westman. In 1973 Anna-Maja Nylén became the first professionally-engaged woman elected to the Academy.

The Academy publishes the periodicals Saga och sed: Kungl. Gustav Adolfs akademiens årsbok, founded in 1934, and Arv: Nordic yearbook of folklore, founded in 1946, and Svenska landsmål och svenskt folkliv (English title: Swedish dialects and folk traditions), published since 1904 by the Archives for Dialect and Folklore studies in Uppsala and taken over by the Academy in 1996.

== Members ==
The Royal Gustavus Adolphus Academy for Swedish Folk Culture's members are divided into the categories of honorary members, supporting members, senior members, domestic working members, foreign working members and corresponding members. The number of domestic working members can be a maximum of 40, foreign working members and supporting members a maximum of 30. A working member is transferred to the senior member category at the age of 70. In 2016, 218 people were members of the Academy.
