= Royal Society of the Humanities in Uppsala =

Swedish Royal academy

The Royal Society of the Humanities at Uppsala (Swedish: Kungl. Humanistiska Vetenskaps-Samfundet i Uppsala) is a Swedish Royal academy for the study of the humanities.

== Founding ==
The society was founded in 1889 by a donation from tannery factory owner Jacob Westin in Stockholm who gave SEK 50,000 in his will dated 1878 to form a scientific community to further the study of philosophy, philology and history sciences. Westin also donated a large collection of books and manuscripts to Uppsala University library.

The society's statutes were ratified by the Swedish king on 28 March 1896.

== Prizes ==
The society annually awards a prize to two doctoral dissertations, known as the Westinska prize.
