= Ivar Arosenius =

Swedish painter and picture book illustrator

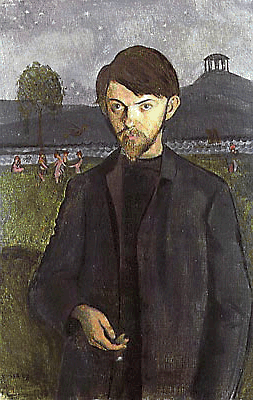
Self-portrait (1908)

Ivar Axel Henrik Arosenius (8 October 1878, Gothenburg – 2 January 1909, Älvängen) was a Swedish painter and picture book illustrator.

== Biography ==
His father Henrik (1841–1901) was a railway engineer and Captain of the Road and Water Engineering Corps.

He began by studying for the real estate trade then, in 1895, he received his first artistic training from an amateur watercolorist. The following year, he began formal studies at the Valand Academy, where he became friends with the sculptor, Gerhard Henning. He also took lessons at the School of Design and Crafts, in the department of decorative painting. In 1898, he was admitted to the Royal Swedish Academy of Fine Arts, where he shared a studio with Henning.

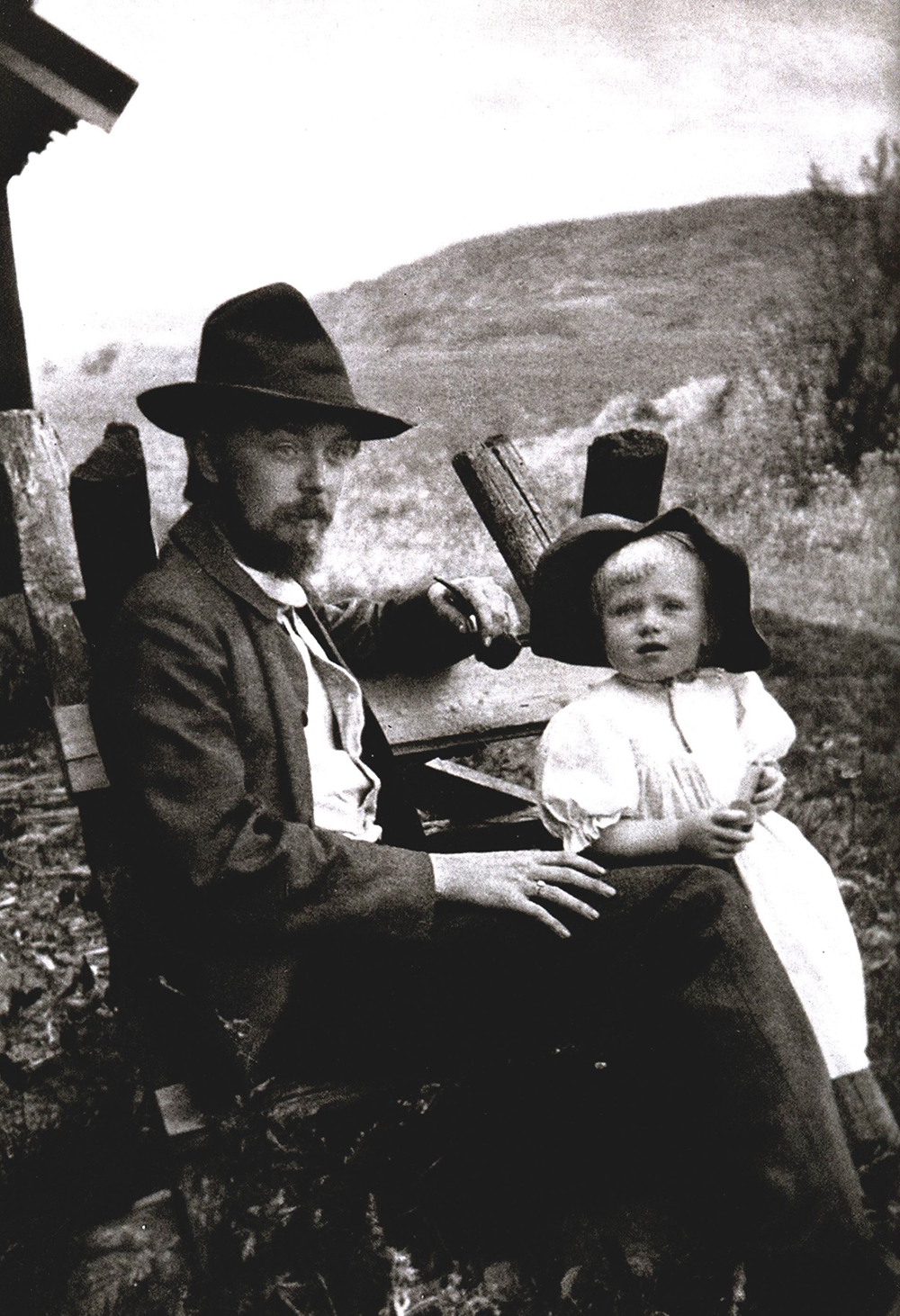
Arosenius and his daughter Eva

He was, however, dissatisfied with the teaching methods there and switched to the Konstnärsförbundets skola ('Artists' Association School'), where he studied with Richard Bergh. After a short time there, he found himself dissatisfied again and returned to the Valand Academy; taking part in an exhibition created by Carl Wilhelmson.

In Gothenburg, he collaborated with Henning and Ole Kruse. They were an odd group, because Kruse was a strict moralist whereas Arosenius was more devoted to pleasure. This was partly the result of his having been diagnosed with haemophilia by a doctor who recommended that he consume alcohol to improve his blood's ability to coagulate. Henning often had to serve as a mediator.

In 1903, he undertook a study trip to Europe, beginning with Munich. He then went to Paris and spent the summer in the fishing village of Coudeville-sur-Mer in Normandy. In 1905, he was back in Paris, participating in an exhibition of watercolors at the Salon des Indépendants. He later spent some time painting in Torsby.

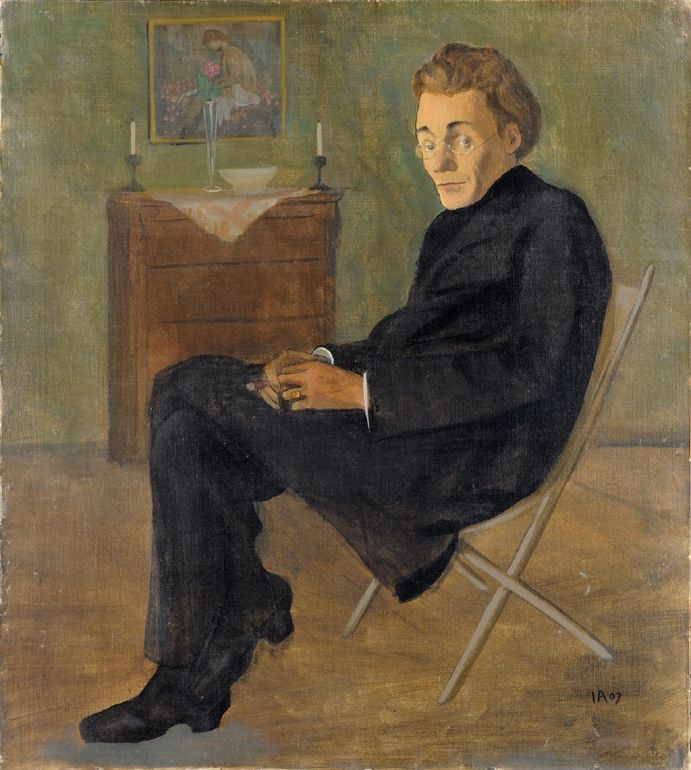
Portrait of Gerhard Henning

He eventually went to Stockholm and had a major showing at the Konstnärshuset. Soon after, he married Ida Adler and they settled in Åby, a small village near Kolmården Forest. They had a daughter that same year. It was then that he began contributing cartoons and drawings to Strix and Söndags-Nisse, both humor magazines. Hasse Zetterström, the editor of Söndags-Nisse, devoted an entire issue to his work in April 1907.

Later, he decided to move his family to Älvängen, where his mother-in-law owned a small property with a view of the Göta River. They lived in a four-room cabin with a studio. In 1908, he made a major breakthrough at Lund University, where he held an exhibition, together with Henning and Sigge Bergström.

That winter, he contracted a throat infection, which was not considered serious. The day after New Year's, his wife was awoken by a strange noise and found him sitting in a chair. When he tried to get up, he fell over and died. A blood vessel had broken while he was coughing and the blood had choked him to death. He was buried in Gothenburg, at the Östra kyrkogården.

A major retrospective was held the year after his death. In the late 1960s, after his widow was killed in an accident in France, his cabin was torn down and the doors (made familiar by one of his popular illustrations) were installed at the Parish Church in Starrkärr. In 1978, his self-portrait was featured in a series of postage stamps which also included Karl Isakson and Carl Kylberg.

The high school in Älvängen is named after him as is the "Aroseniusvägen", a street in Södra Ängby, Stockholm. Another street in Gothenburg, the "Aroseniusgatan" was named after him in 1944.

== Selected works ==
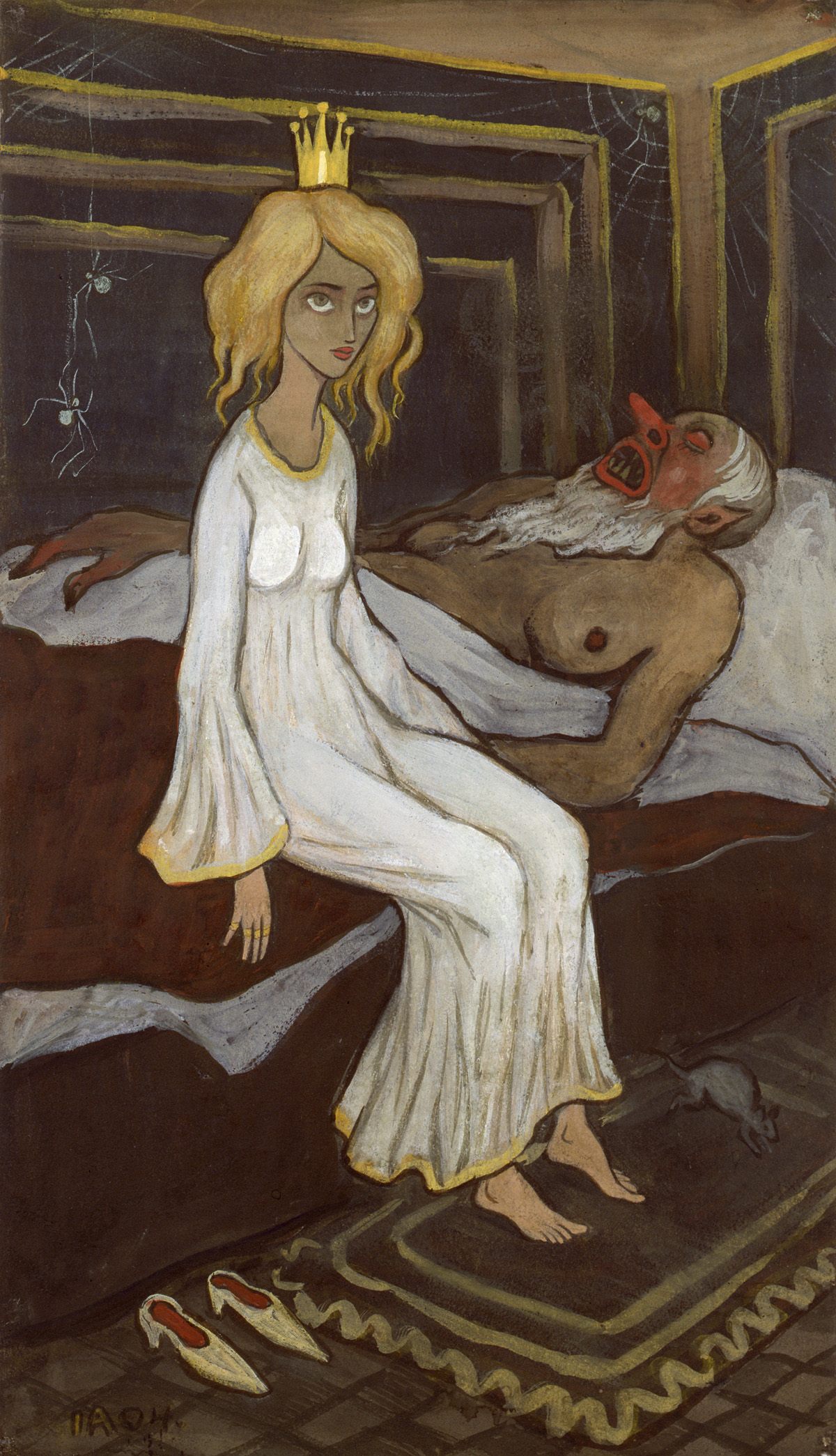
The Princess and the Troll

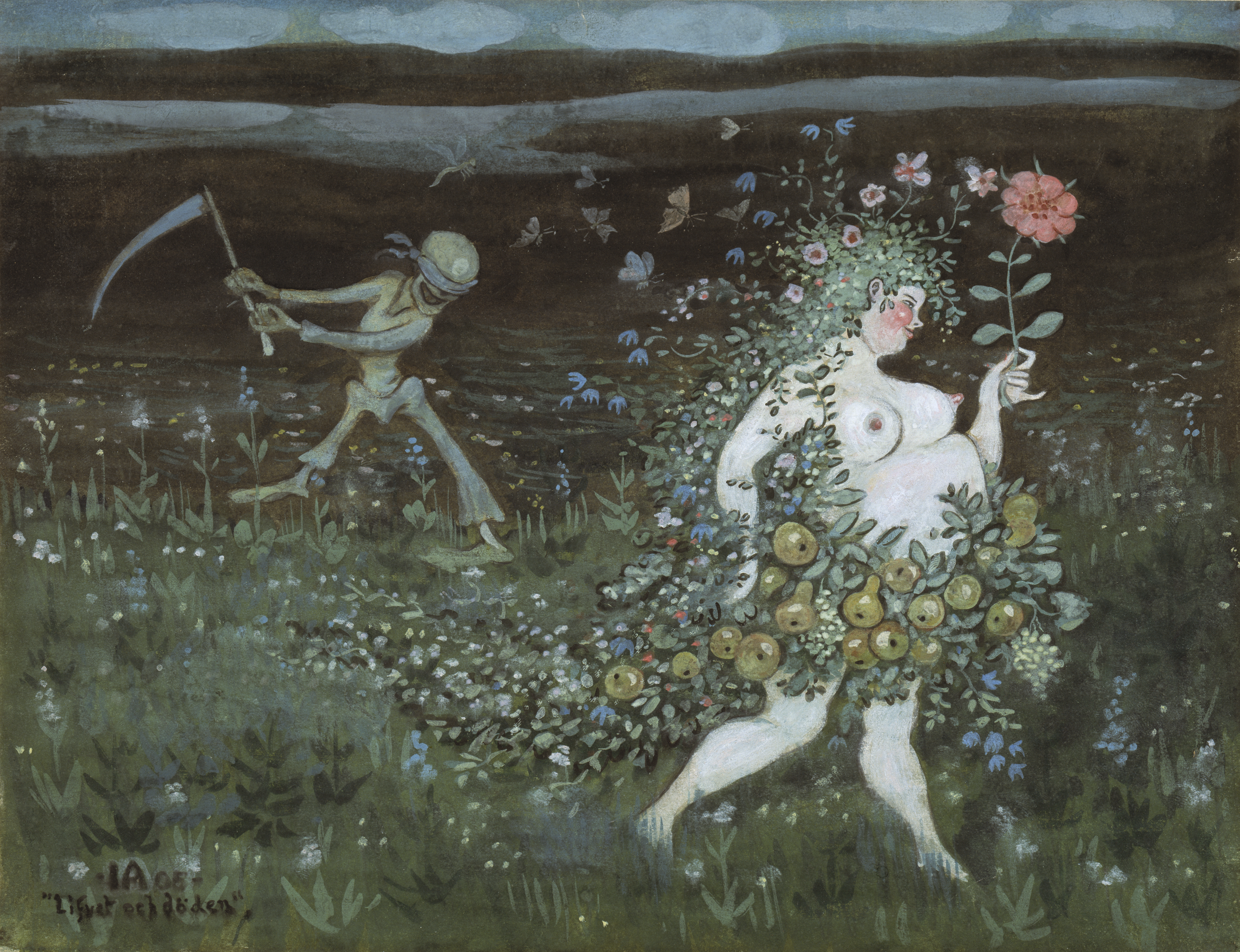
Life and Death

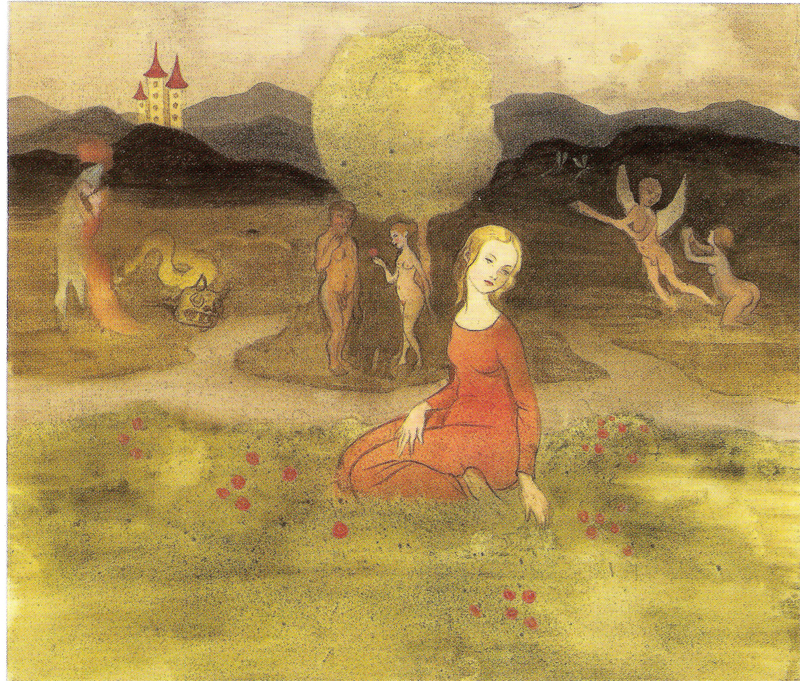
Dreams of Love

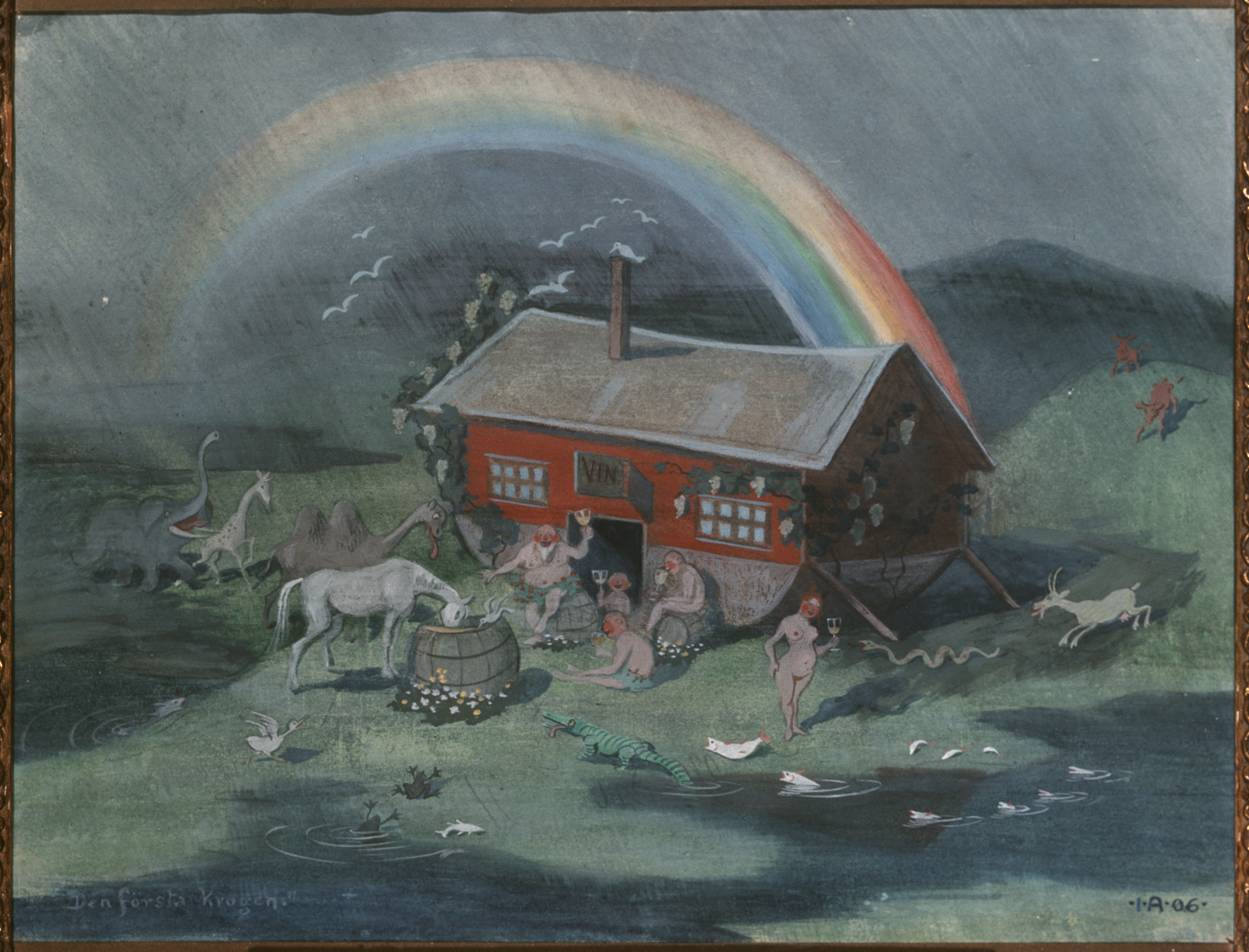
The First Tavern

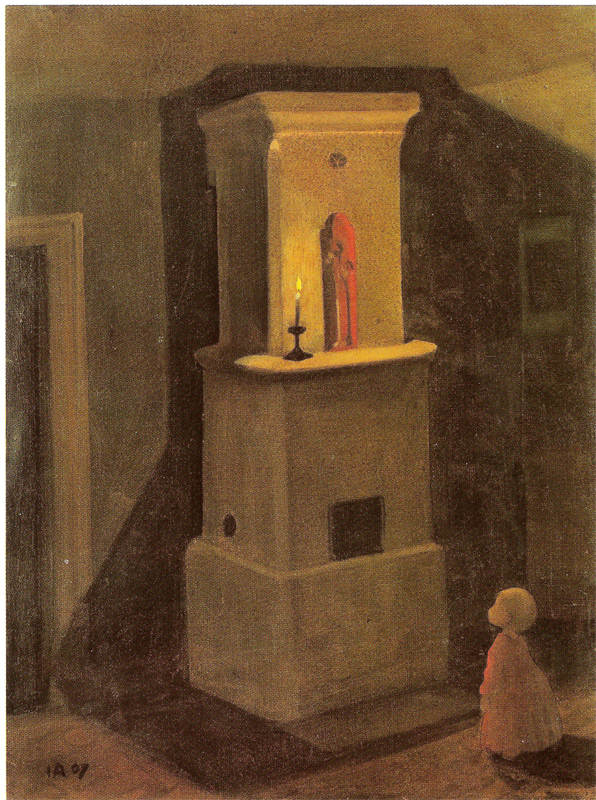
The Girl and the Candle
