= Zetterstrom =

Zetterstrom is a surname. Notable people with the surname include:

- Arne Zetterström, underwater diver
- Dan Zetterström (born 1954), Swedish ornithologist
- Hasse Zetterström (1877–1946), Swedish writer
- Jacob Widell Zetterström (born 1998), Swedish footballer
- Lars Zetterström (born 1953), Swedish ice hockey player
- Magnus Zetterström (born 1971), Swedish racer
- Rolf Zetterström (1920–2011), Swedish doctor
- Ulf Zetterström (born 1958), Swedish ice hockey player
