= Oskar Andersson =

Swedish cartoonist (1877–1906)

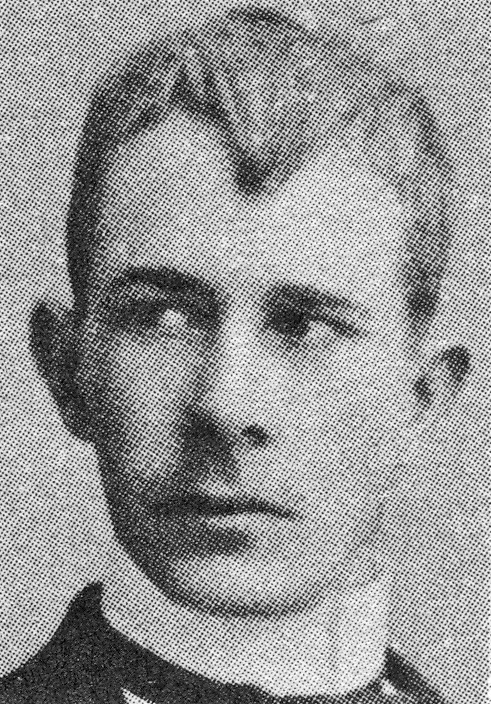
- Born: January 11, 1877; Kungsholmen, Stockholm
- Died: November 28, 1906 (aged 29); Ekerö, Stockholms län
- Occupation: Cartoonist
- Years active: 1897-1906
- Notable work: "Mannen som gör vad som faller honom in" (The Man Who Does Whatever Comes To His Mind)

Oskar Emil "O. A." Andersson (11 January 1877 – 28 November 1906) was a Swedish cartoonist and one of Sweden's first true comic creators. He greatly influenced Swedish cartooning culture.

== Biography ==
=== Early life ===
Andersson began working in his teens in the Royal Mint. When he realised his passions lay with drawing, he enrolled in Technology school and passed with good qualifications. Design, however, did not interest him. His teacher, Kaleb Althin, encouraged him to take up caricaturing.

=== Turn to cartooning ===
At the age of twenty, Andersson debuted with his cartoons in the Söndags-Nisse magazine, where he soon got employed. Inspired by the early comic artists from the United States and England in the late 19th century, Andersson created Sweden's first recurring comic strips: Bröderna Napoleon och Bartholomeus Lunds från Grönköping Resa Jorden Runt (about two brothers on a world tour), Mannen Som Gör Vad Som Faller Honom In (about a strange man who does whatever comes to his mind) and Urhunden (about a prehistoric dog and its owner), all around the turn of the century.

Andersson was apparently friends with Swedish sculptor Carl Milles.

=== Suicide ===
In 1906, Oskar, who apparently experienced long depressions and obsessive–compulsive disorder (OCD), committed suicide by shooting himself. The reasons for this are not entirely known, but Andersson was also known for his social anxiety, as well as incidents during his work as a reportage cartoonist, as he was exposed to severe mistreatment of military horses, which as an animal lover worsened his depression. Andersson is buried at Ekerö church cemetery.

== Career ==
Andersson's best known strip, "Mannen som gör vad som faller honom in" (The Man Who Does Whatever Comes To His Mind) was one of the first recurring comic strips in Swedish history. It was a 20-episode serial chronicling the misadventures of an anarchistic man who does whatever he wants, no matter how amoral it may be.

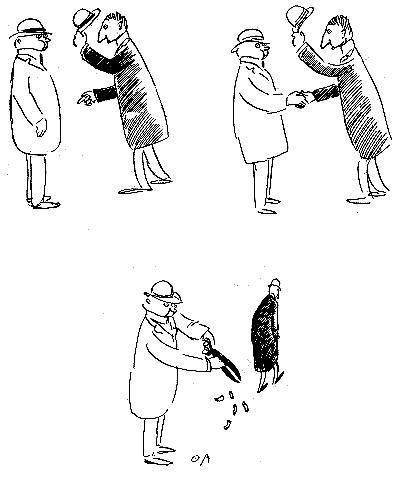
A 1902 instalment of "Mannen som gör vad som faller honom in", a cartoon by Oskar Andersson.

=== Other strips ===
Other cartooning works by Oskar Andersson include Urhunden, a strip about a prehistoric man and his pet dinosaur, and countless political satire cartoons. Among his contemporaries, Andersson was primarily known for his caricatures, which were published in Swedish newspapers Söndags-Nisse and Strix, between 1897–1906.

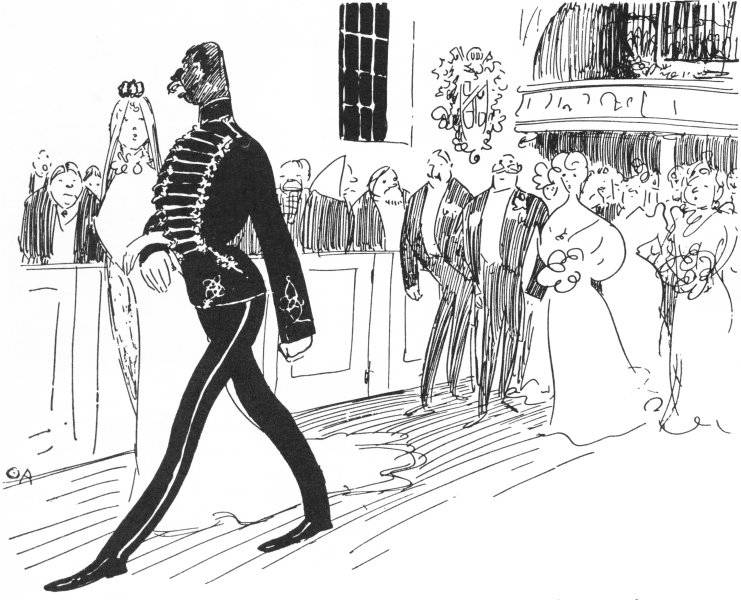
A military caricature by Andersson
