= Arosenius =

Arosenius is a surname. Notable people with the surname include:

- Ivar Arosenius, Swedish painter and picture book illustrator
- Per-Axel Arosenius (1920–1981), Swedish actor
