= Albert Engström =

Swedish artist (1869–1940)

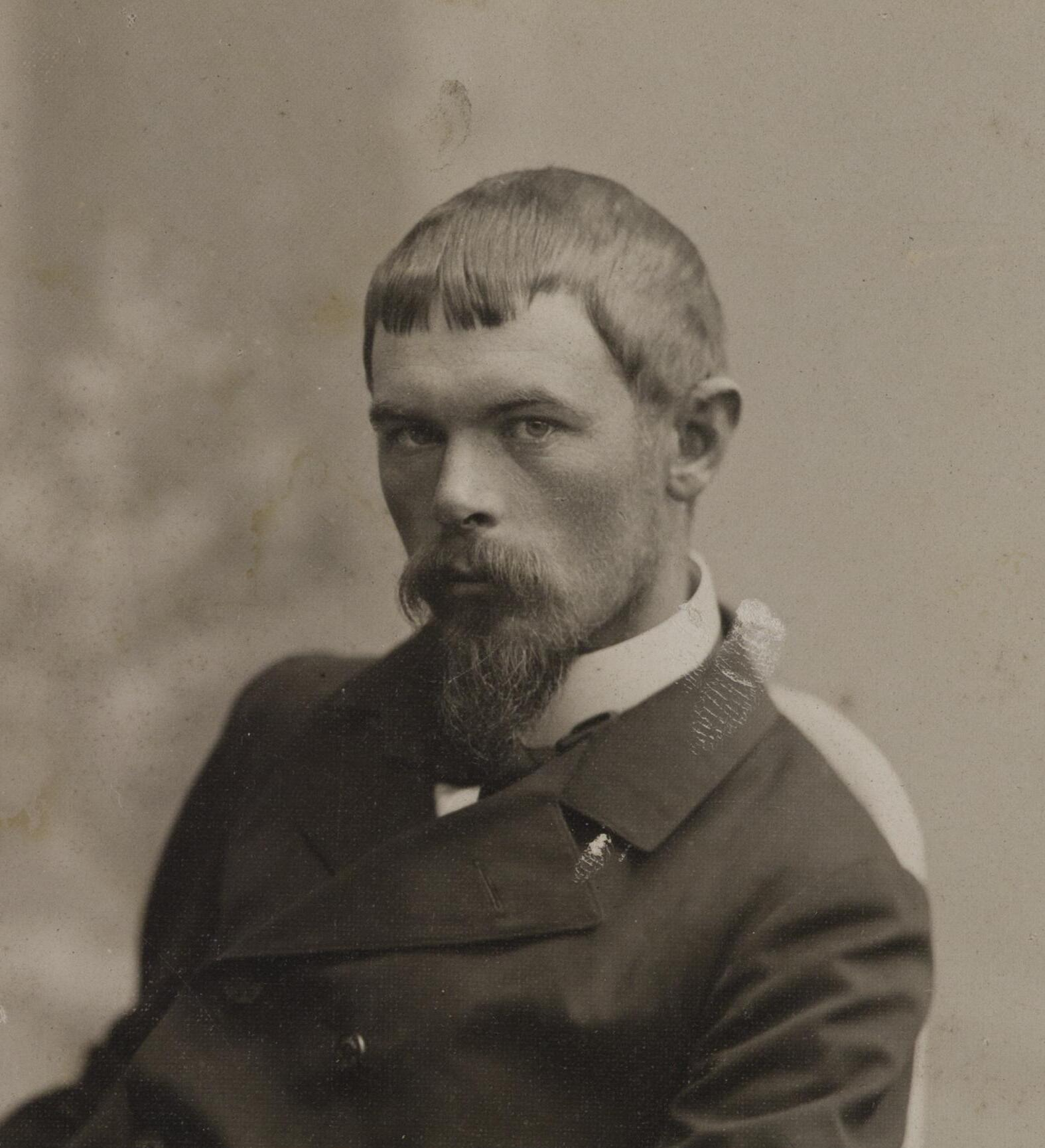
- Born: Albert Laurentius Johannes Engström; 12 May 1869; Lönneberga, Kalmar County, Sweden
- Died: 16 November 1940 (aged 71); Stockholm, Sweden
- Occupations: Author, artist

Albert Engström (1869–1940) was a Swedish artist, author and member of the Swedish Academy from 1922.

== Career ==
Engström was born in Lönneberga, Kalmar County (Småland) but spent most of his childhood in Hult near Eksjö, where his father was the railroad stationmaster. He graduated from Norrköping secondary school in 1888 and went to Uppsala University the following year to read Latin and Greek, a pursuit which he abandoned after two years. In 1892 he enrolled at the Valand School of Fine Arts in Gothenburg to study under Carl Larsson.

Between 1894 and 1896 Albert Engström was on the editorial staff for the satirical publication Söndags-Nisse. In 1897 he founded the humor magazine Strix. Among the themes of his many illustrations were those of tramps and drunkards, and indeed alcohol, or rather its adverse effects, featured largely in his humour. One such recurring fictional character was Kolingen.

In a book of autobiographical sketches the author Evert Taube described Engström: "He had a peculiar face with eyes like a bird of Minerva beneath a lofty forehead and bangs . . . a tough but sensitively chiseled nose and faunlike mouth surrounded by a scraggly French goatee — in short, a face that so captivated Swedes that all were compelled to look over to where he sat. He moved as softly and quietly as a bear and had the lanky appearance of a sailor from Småland. One began thinking of shipwrecks and sleigh rides when he entered a room. But he brought to mind other things as well. He could smile just like Velázquez's god of wine and roar with laughter like a roustabout . . ."

Engström coined the word "Grönköping" in 1895 as a caption for some of his drawings, thereby inventing the fictional Swedish town of the same name. In 2002 the CD Grönköping Tar Ton was issued in Sweden to commemorate one hundred years of Grönköpings Veckoblad (Grönköping's Weekly), a satirical monthly magazine that was founded in 1902. The album, depicting Grönköping in recordings made between 1908 and 1946, is available through iTunes.

Several of Albert Engström's stories have been translated into English and appeared in books and magazines published in England and the United States. Engström was a second cousin once removed to Swedish author Astrid Lindgren.

== Translations of his works ==
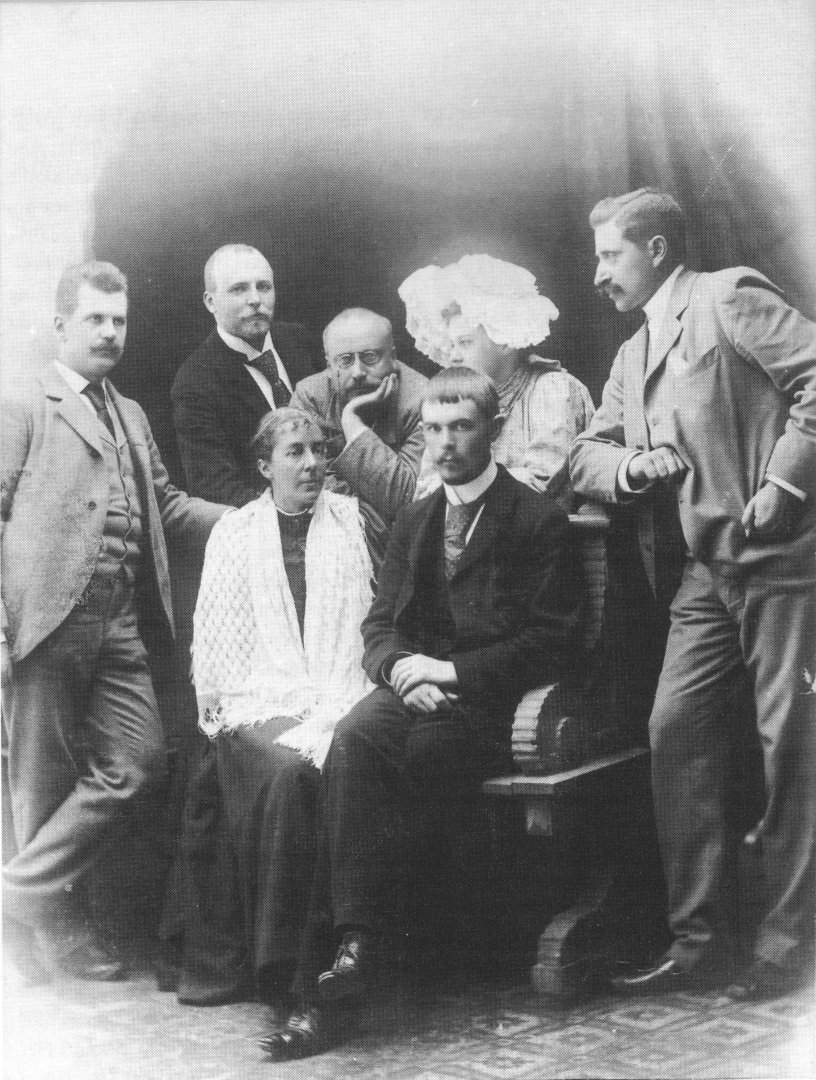
Influential Swedish critics and authors of the 1890s. Albert Engström sitting in front.

Charles Wharton Stork

- Charles XII, Hercules and Gustav Mattson

E. Sprigge and C. Napier

- The Grey Seal
- Osarkrak
- A Jest of Janson's
- Swedish Panopticon

Harold Borland

- Politeness
- The Journey to Stockholm of Mrs. Holm, the Dean's Wife
- The Power of the Press
- Whitsun
- Söderbom
- The Funeral Hat
- When I was Czar
- A Bookworm
- A Ghost Story
- An Uppsala Memory
- Causerie
- The Unkind Author

Edith T. Aney and Sven O. Karell

- Aidesimos of Aleppo
- Moose
- The Mystery of the Three Hundred Cans

Cultural offices
Preceded by Oscar Montelius	Swedish Academy, Seat No 18; 1922-1940	Succeeded by Gunnar Mascoll Silfverstolpe
