= Ole Kruse =

Danish-Swedish painter (1868–1948)

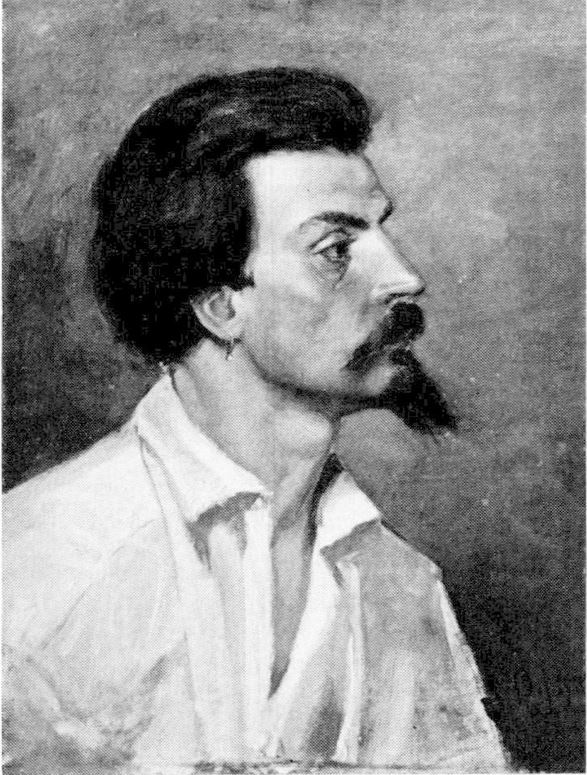
Ole Kruse; portrait by Oscar Björck

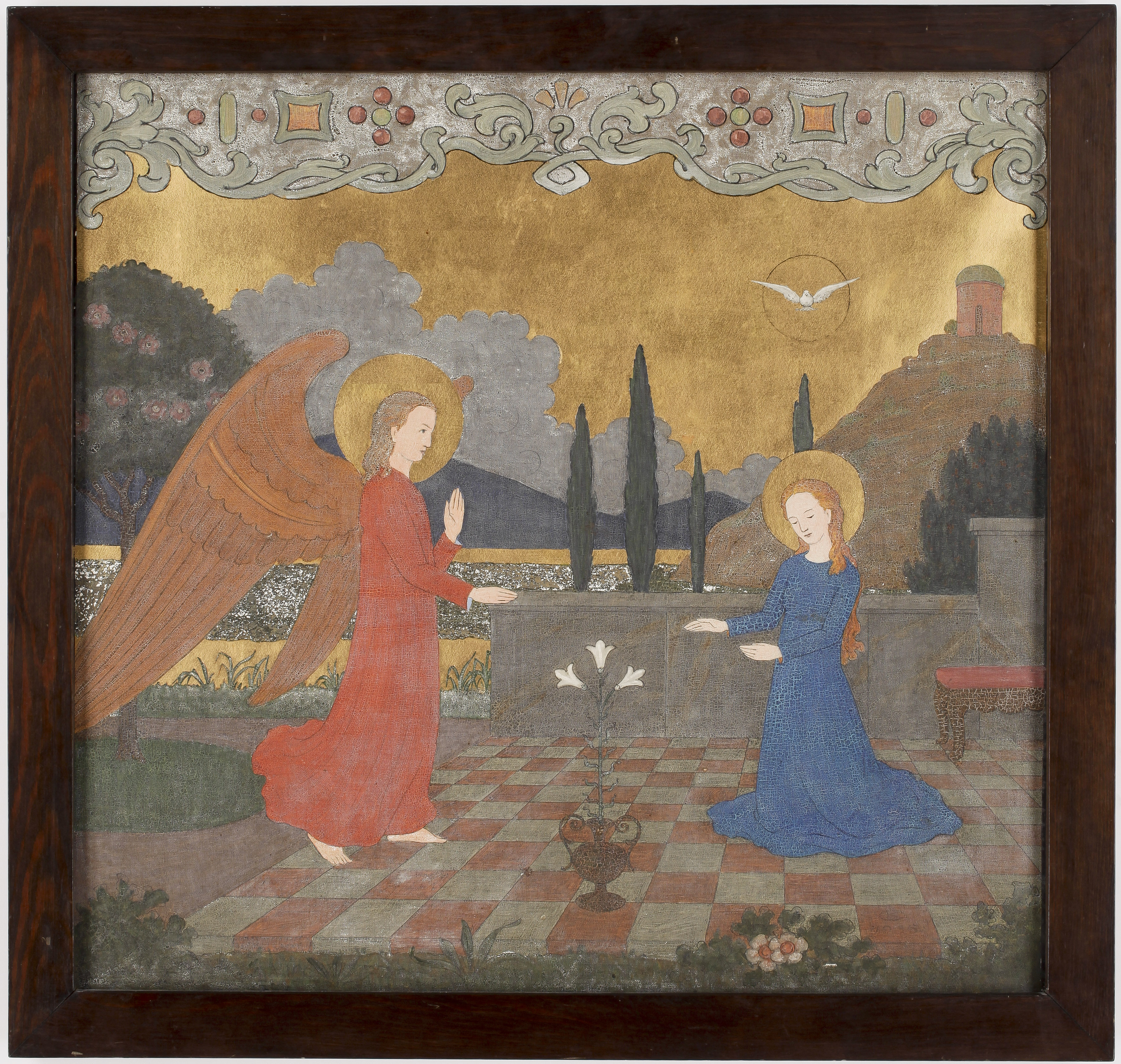
Religious Motif

Waldemar Thisenius Kruse, known as Ole (13 May 1868, Haderslev – 29 November 1948, Bokenäs, Uddevalla Municipality) was a Danish-Swedish painter.

== Biography ==
His father was a master painter and he began his career in his father's workshop. He initially worked as a decorative painter, throughout Northern Europe and Scandinavia. It was in Germany, in 1879, that he married Sophie Agnes Schlotfeldt, the daughter of a master carpenter. His first appearance as an artist came in 1893, at the Nordic Exhibition in Christiania (Oslo), while he was working as a decorator for the National Theatre. But it would be another twenty years before he received major critical attention at exhibits in Stockholm and Helsinki.

At the turn of the century, he became the center of a group of young, Bohemian artists in Goteborg; a group that included Ivar Arosenius, Nils Rosberg, David Lundahl and John Ekman. The group broke up within a few years, which was apparently due to a falling out between him and Arosenius over the affections of the actress, Esther Sahlin, who had several other admirers among their clique. For many years, she continued to appear in his artwork and poetry, disguised under the name "Gulditop" (something akin to "Goldilocks").

Shortly after that affair, he moved from Goteborg to nearby Örgryte, where he became a close friend and confidant of the ship-owner and philanthropist, Werner Lundqvist, who would be a major donor to the local art museum. He and his wife eventually settled in Uddevala, where he devoted some of his time to book illustrations, but was slowly forgotten.

He painted mostly religious and symbolic works, in a Naive style; completely divorced from any contemporary trends. The largest collection of his works may be seen at the Göteborgs konstmuseum
