= Gerhard Henning =

Swedish-Danish sculptor

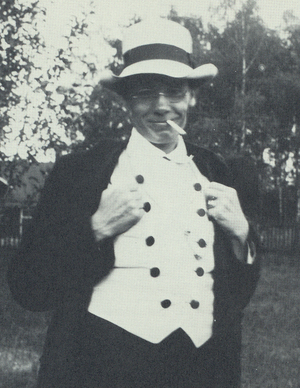
- Gerhard Henning photographed on his honey moon in 1912
- Born: 27 May 1880; Stockholm, Sweden
- Died: 16 September 1967 (aged 87); Hellerup, Copenhagen, Denmark
- Resting place: Cemetery of Holmen, Copenhagen
- Known for: Sculpture
- Awards: Thorvaldsen Medal, 1937; Prince Eugen Medal, 1955

Gerhard Henning (27 May 1880 – 16 September 1967) was a Swedish-Danish sculptor. While working at the Royal Danish Porcelain Factory, he designed a number of delicately decorated figurines. He is however remembered above all for his statues celebrating the female form.

== Early life ==
After attending the Technical School in Copenhagen (1892–94), he worked for a couple of years as a house painter's apprentice before spending the winter of 1897–98 in Gothenburg. There he met the Swedish painter Ivar Arosenius (1898–1902) whose friendship greatly influenced his early work as a painter and illustrator. Their circle of friends was also inspired by the British illustrator Aubrey Beardsley whose erotic style is also reflected in Henning's early work. In 1931, Henning became a Danish citizen.

== Career ==
In 1909, Henning began to work for Copenhagen's Royal Porcelain Factory where, apart from an interruption from 1914 to 1920, he continued to be employed until 1925. There he met and married china painter Gerda Heydorn, who later became a noted textile designer with whom he occasionally collaborated.

Although he had never had instruction specifically in sculpture, he created sophisticated little groups of figures, often in erotic situations inspired by 18th century French art. But after he had met Kai Nielsen and had studied the sculptural works of Auguste Rodin, Aristide Maillol and some of the classical works in the Glyptothek, his approach developed along more personal and monumental lines. Henning showed an early interest in classical poetry, especially Ovid's Metamorphoses, which inspired him to create a number of amorous figures such as Cupid with Psyche and Pygmalion with Galathea. His main theme was however the naked female figure which he initially developed in collaboration with Kai Nielsen. His statuette of a "Reclining Girl" (1914) led to Nielsen's "Leda without the Swan" which in turn encouraged him to experiment with larger formats. His large female figures began with the bold "Danae" (1927) and was soon followed by the voluptuous "Girl Standing" (1929).

Around 1930, he altered his style with his "Moder Girl", a slender, short-haired figure in contrast to the heavier bushy-haired figures inspired by antiquity. During the 1930s, he added shoes and socks to his naked figures but soon omitted them again. His "Seated Girl" (1938) is based on a complex diagonal theme but stands in calm, harmonious equilibrium like his "Reclining Girl" (1943). He worked on his last large sculpture "Susanne" (1964) for a full 10 years, drawing on his sketches of Pygmalion and Galatea from 1919 to 1920. His work was part of the sculpture event in the art competition at the 1932 Summer Olympics.

== Royal Copenhagen figurines ==
One of the finest works executed by Henning while he was at the Royal Copenhagen factory was "The Princess on the Pea" inspired by Hans Christian Andersen's fairy story. With meticulous attention to detail, Henning has depicted a series of images on the many surfaces of the glazed sculpture including Chinese dragons, Persian warriors and children at play. Created in 1911, the following year the piece was awarded the First Class Medal at the Paris Salon where it was considered to be one of the finest pieces of European porcelain of the times.

Other overglazed figurines include three Fairy Tale couples (1912–1914), Moongirl (1913), (Satyr and Nymph (1910), Cupid and Psyche (1914), Grief (1914), Venus (1924), and Susanne (1924).

== Assessment ==
With his appreciation of the curvature and tension of the female form, Henning is one of the most important contributors to the female figure in Danish sculpture.

In 1937, Henning was awarded the Thorvaldsen Medal and in 1955 received the Prince Eugen Medal.

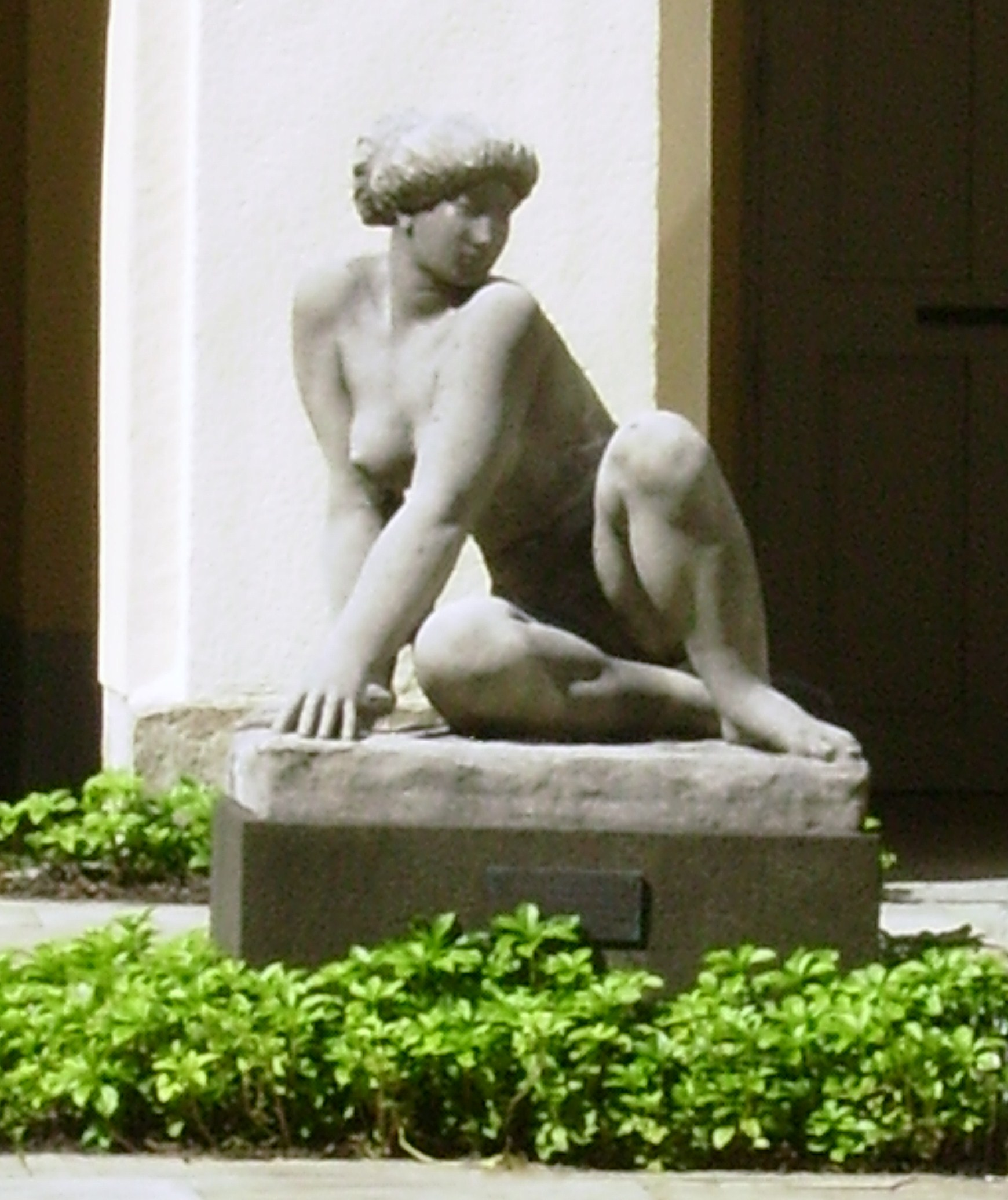
Assise (1936), Danemark Horsens

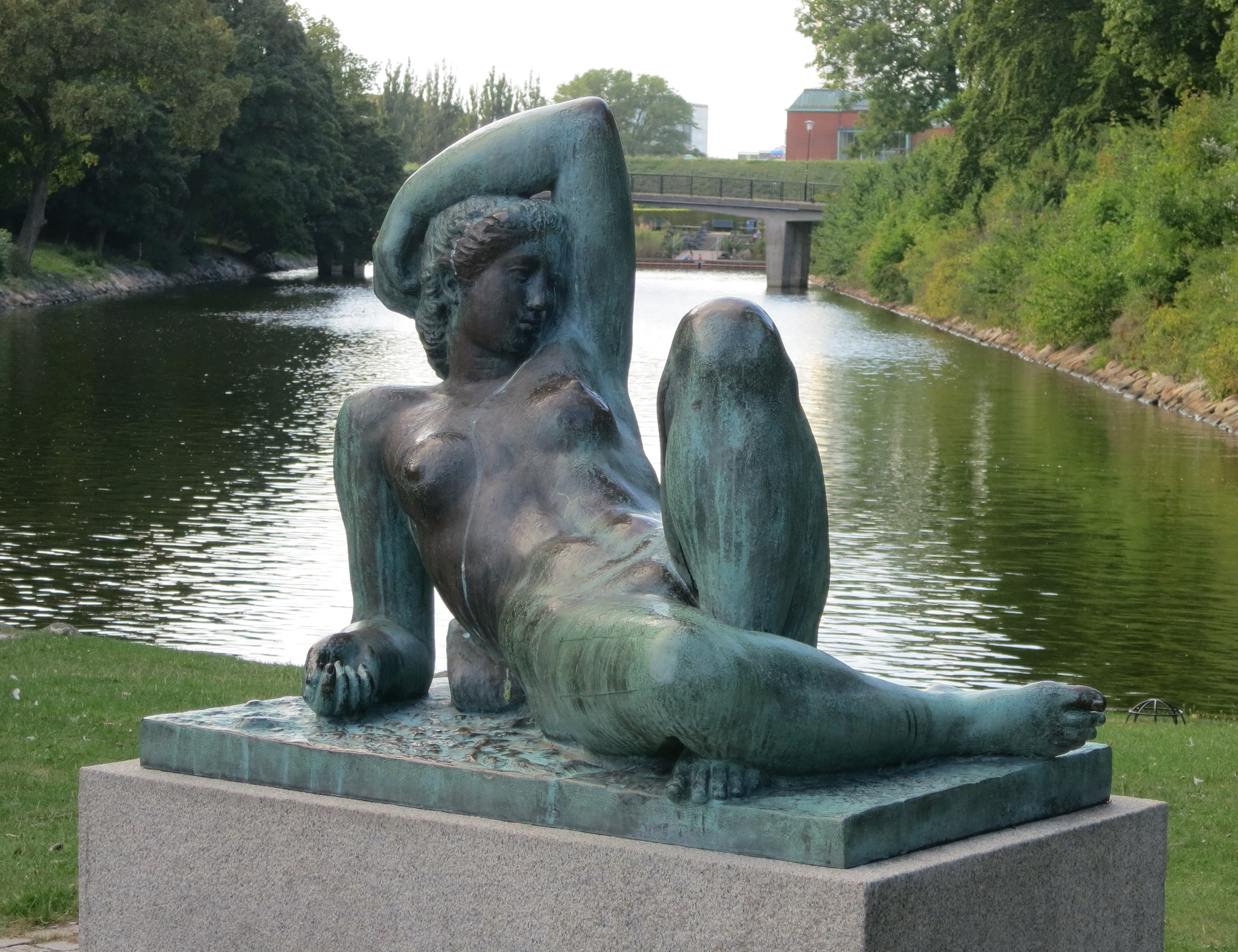
Jeune fille allongée (1961) Suède Malmo

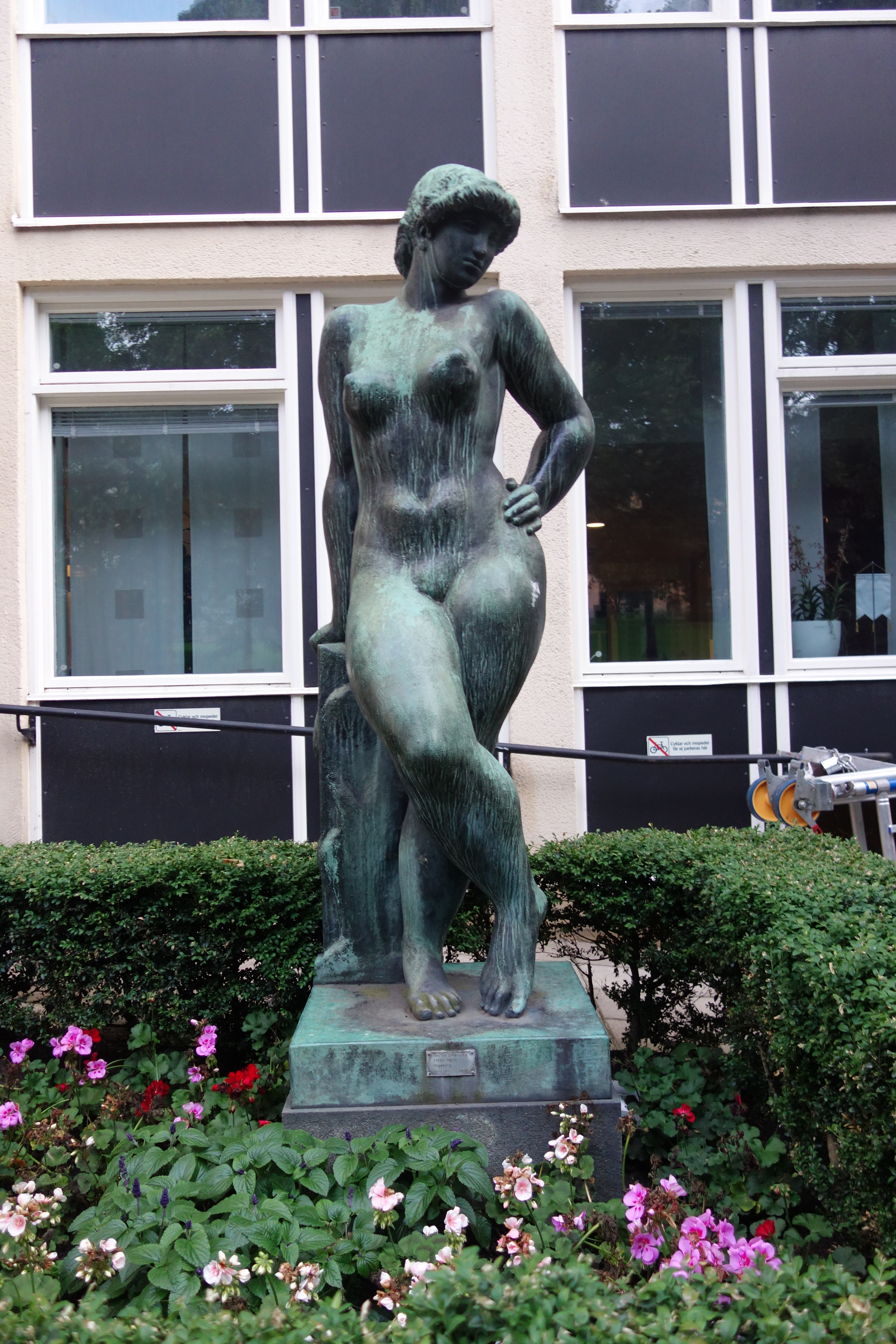
Sculpture "Ingeborg, Danish Girl ", Stockholm Slottspark
