= Aftonbladet =

Swedish newspaper

- Type: Daily newspaper
- Format: Tabloid
- Owners: LO (9%); Schibsted (91%)
- Founder: Lars Johan Hierta
- Publisher: Lotta Folcker
- Editor-in-chief: Lotta Folcker
- Founded: 6 December 1830; 195 years ago
- Political alignment: Independent social-democrat
- Language: Swedish
- Headquarters: Västra Järnvägsgatan 21, Stockholm
- Circulation: 55,000 (2025)
- ISSN: 1103-9000
- Website: aftonbladet.se

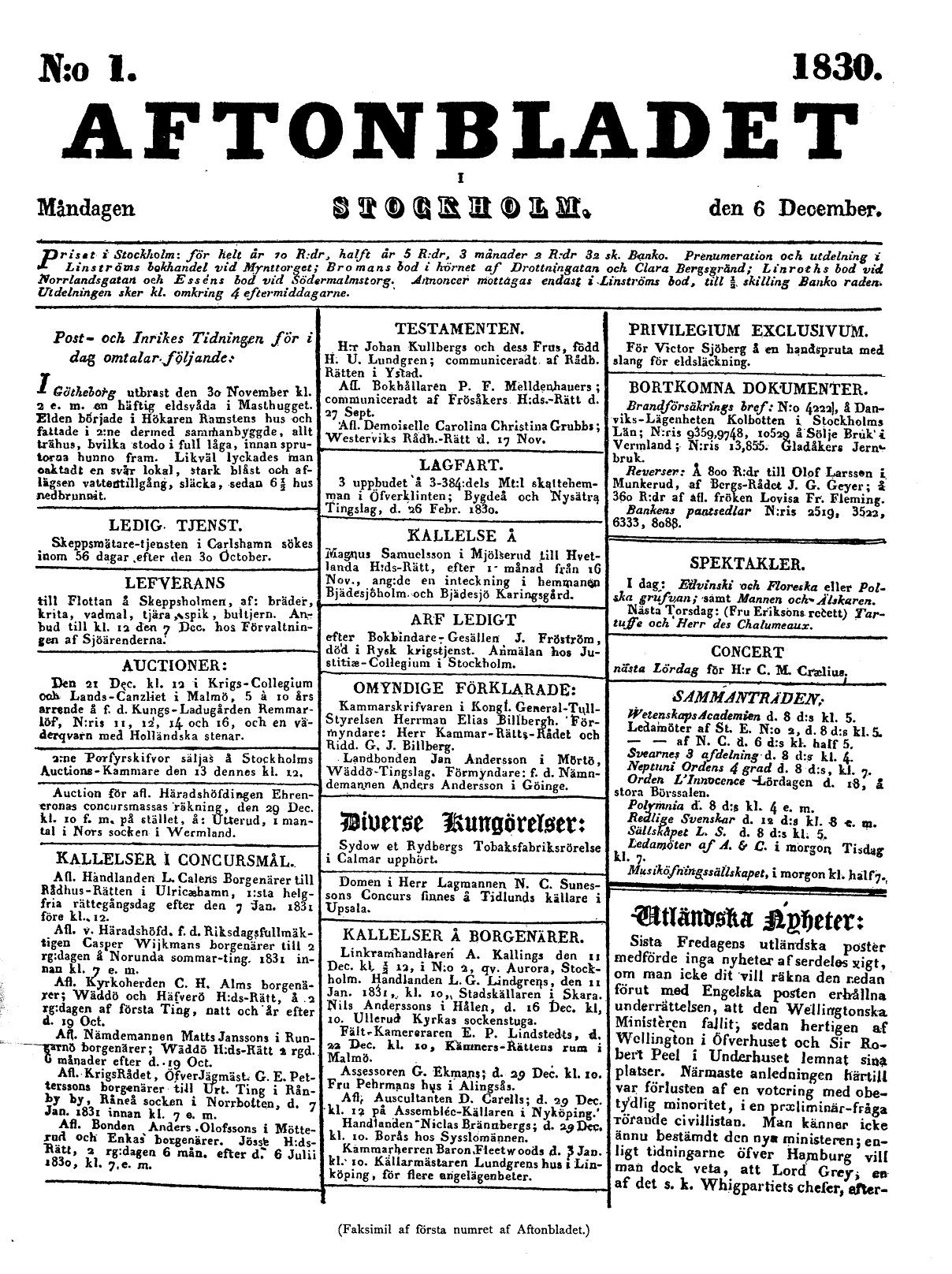
The first page of the first issue of Aftonbladet

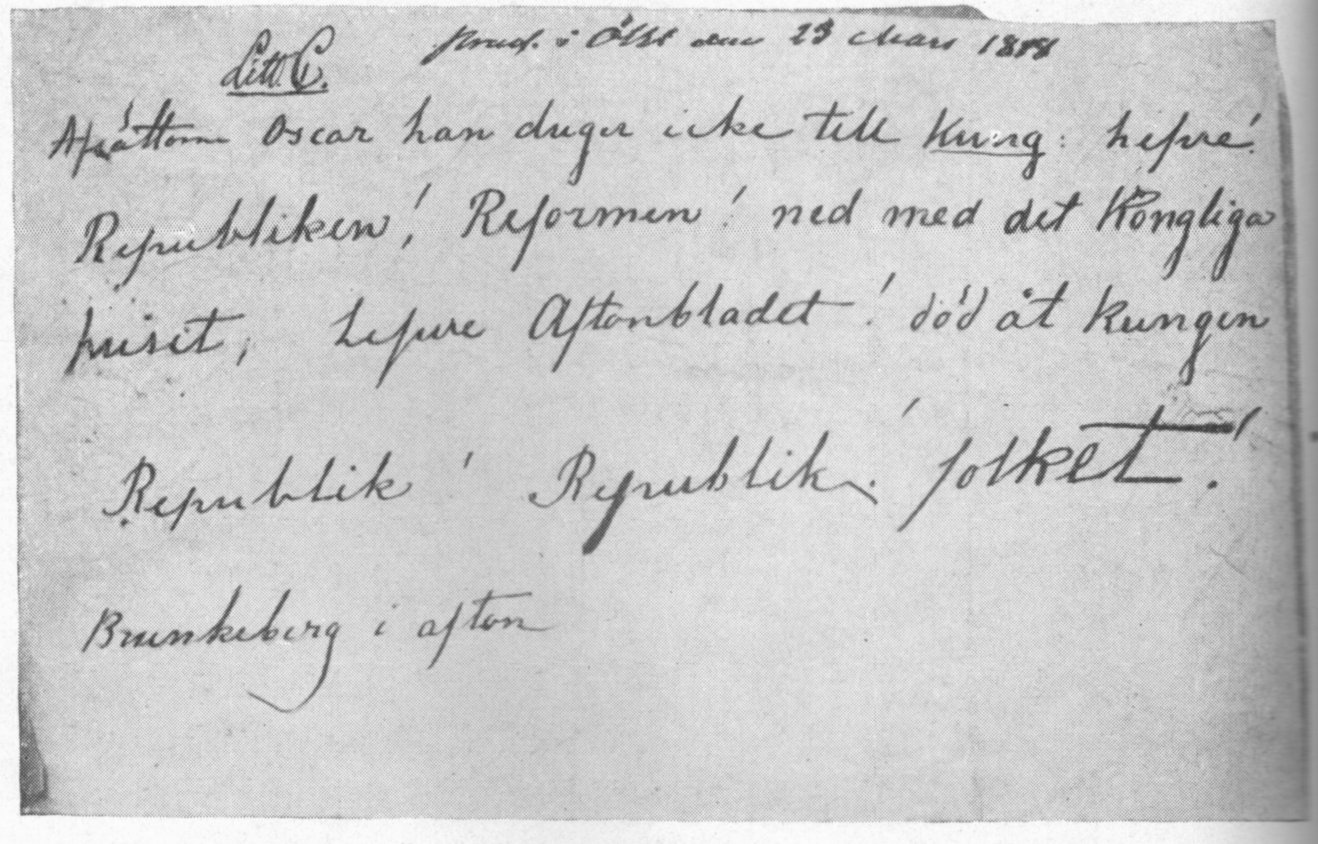
In a hand-written bill from the Stockholm riots during the Revolutions of 1848, support for the then-banned Aftonbladet is coupled with a call for overturning the monarchy and instituting a republic.

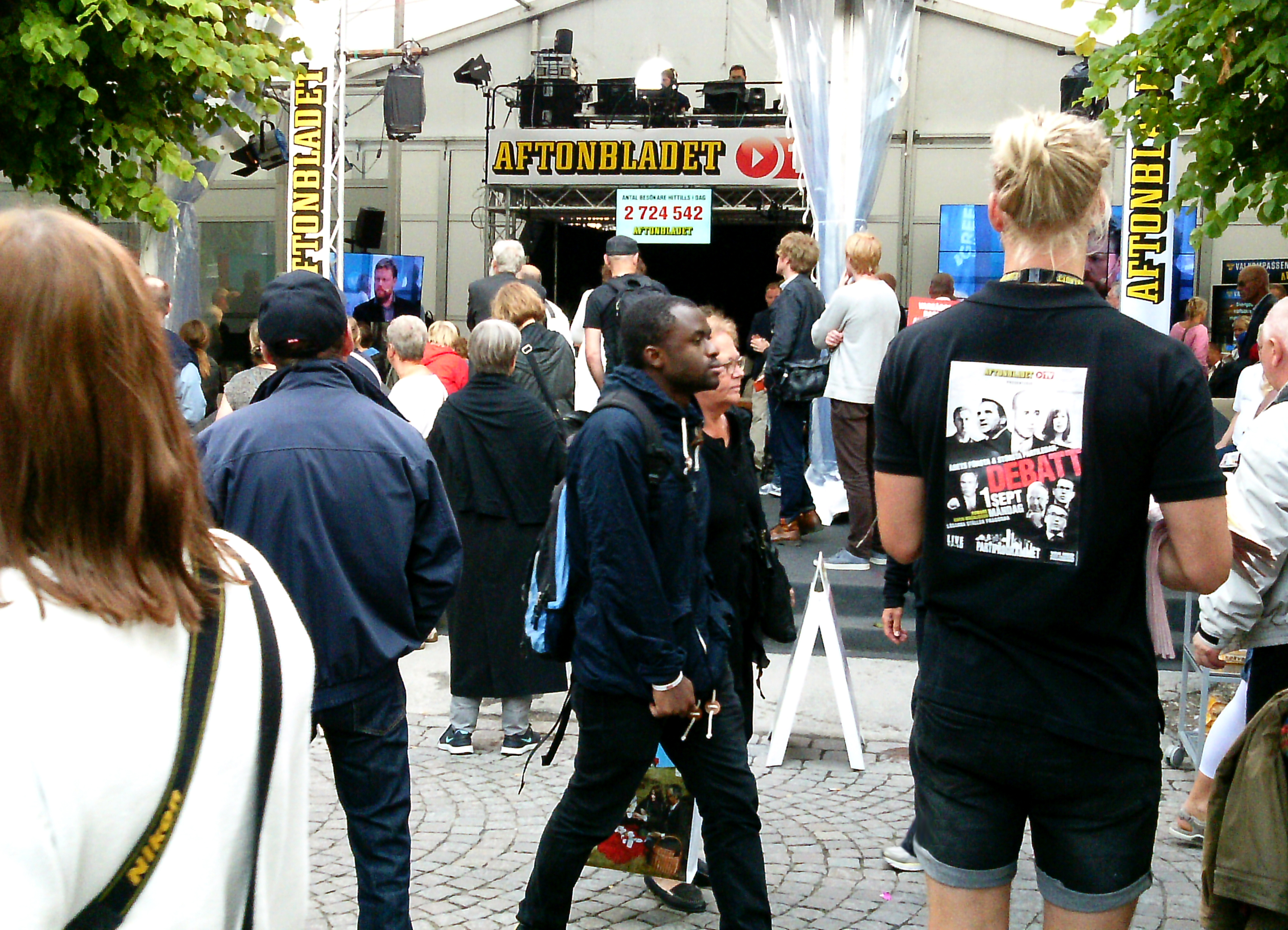
Aftonbladet's booth during the Almedalen Week 2014, Visby, Gotland, Sweden

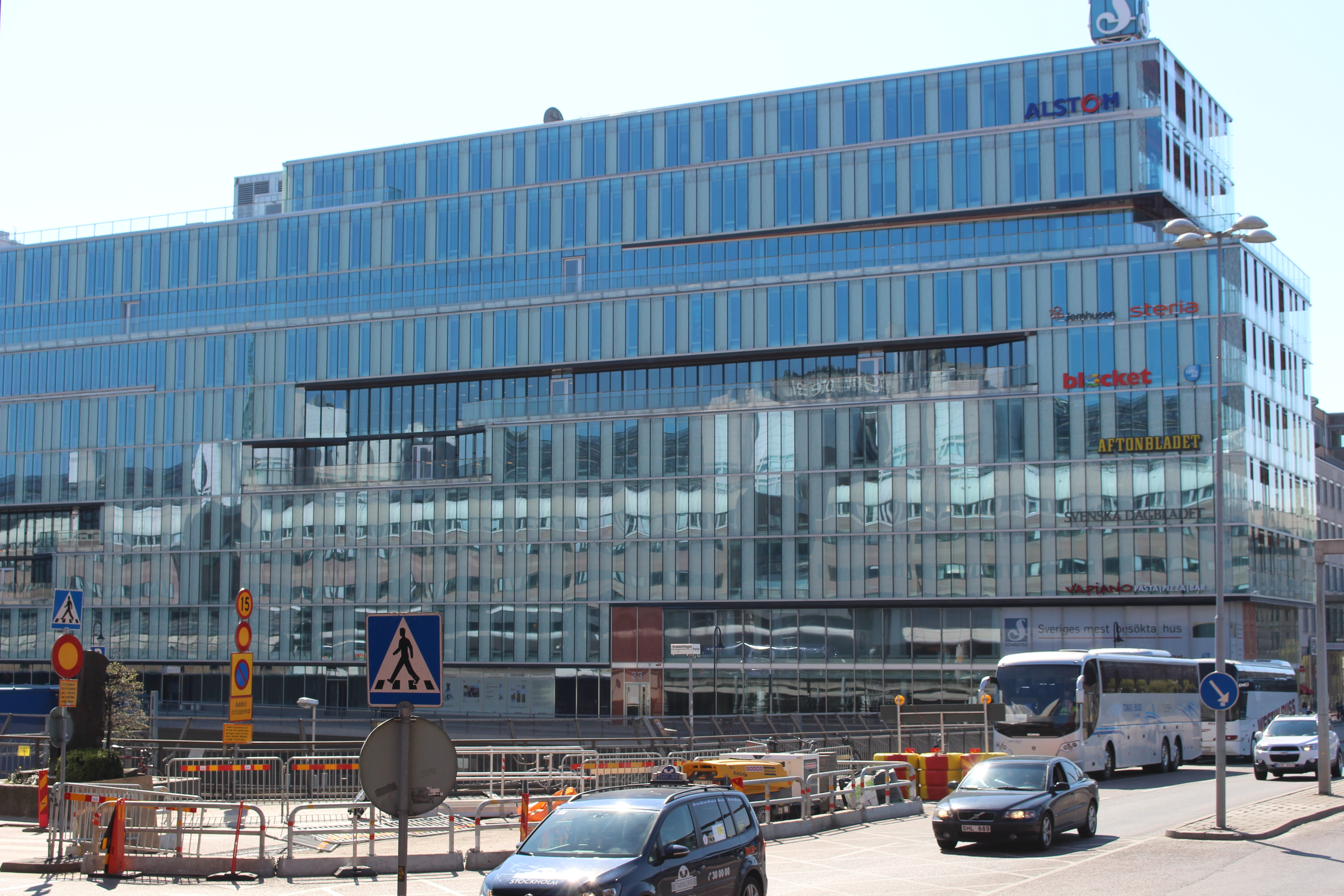
Aftonbladet's headquarters in Stockholm

Aftonbladet (Swedish: [ˈâftɔnˌblɑːdɛt], lit. 'The evening paper') is a Swedish daily newspaper published in Stockholm, Sweden. It is one of the largest daily newspapers in the Nordic countries.

== History and profile ==
The newspaper was founded by Lars Johan Hierta in December 1830 under the name of Aftonbladet i Stockholm during the modernization of Sweden. Often critical and oppositional, the paper was repeatedly banned from publishing. However, Hierta circumvented the bans by constantly reviving the paper under slightly modified names, as, legally speaking, a new publication. Thus, on 16 February 1835, he issued the first edition of New Aftonbladet, which would – after yet another ban – be followed by Newer Aftonbladet, in turn followed by Fourth Aftonbladet, Fifth Aftonbladet, and so on. In 1852 the paper began to use its current name, Aftonbladet, after a total of 25 name changes. It currently describes itself as an "independent social-democratic newspaper." Augusta Barthelson often wrote small stories in the newspaper.

The owners of Aftonbladet are the Swedish Trade Union Confederation (LO) which bought it in the 1950s and Norwegian media group Schibsted, which acquired its share in the paper in the late 1990s. LO sold a large part of its shares in the paper to the Schibsted group. As per 15 June 2009 Schibsted bought another 41% and became the majority owner with 91%. However, LO has the right to appoint the political editor of the paper.

Aftonbladet, based in Stockholm, is published in tabloid format. The paper reported news and also criticised the new Swedish king Charles XIV John. The king stopped Aftonbladet from being printed and banned it. This was answered by starting the new newspaper "Det andra Aftonbladet" (The second Aftonbladet), which was subsequently banned, followed by new versions named in similar fashion until the newspaper had been renamed 26 times, after which it was allowed by the king.

During its existence, Aftonbladet has leant in different political directions. Initially liberal, it drifted towards conservatism under Harald Sohlman, editor in chief from 1890 to 1921. In 1929, the newspaper came under the control of the Kreuger family, when a majority of the shares was bought by Swedish Match, at that time the heart of Ivar Kreuger's corporate empire. Aftonbladet was labeled "neutral". In 1932 it backed Per Albin Hansson's new Social Democratic government. Just a few years later it realigned with the Liberal Party and turned to advocate liberal politics. Heavily influenced by pro-German staff members, the newspaper supported Germany during World War II.

The Kreuger era came to an end on 8 October 1956. Despite interest from both the Liberal Party and the Centre Party, Torsten Kreuger sold Aftonbladet as well as Stockholms-Tidningen to the Swedish Trade Union Confederation. Since then, the editorial line has been supportive of the Social Democrats. The ownership change was first followed by a slight drop in circulation. In the 1960s, however, the newspaper saw its circulation surge rapidly, peaking at 507,000.

By the early 1990s Aftonbladet had run into economic problems, and many had begun to question the competence of the trade union movement as a media owner. On 2 May 1996, the Norwegian media group Schibsted acquired a 49.9 percent stake in the newspaper. The Swedish Trade Union Confederation kept the remaining 50.1 percent of its shares. The same year its circulation passed that of long-time tabloid rival Expressen. In 2005 Aftonbladet started a Web portal for business news as a joint venture with Svenska Dagbladet.

In 1998, the circulation of Aftonbladet was 397,000 copies on weekdays and 502,000 copies on Sundays. The circulation of the paper was 402,000 copies in 2001. As of 2004 the paper was the most selling daily both in Sweden and in other Nordic countries, having a circulation of 422,000 copies. It was 429,000 copies on weekdays in 2005. In 2006 the paper had 1,425,000 daily readers (Orvesto research 2005:2), circa 15% of the Swedish population. The paper had a circulation of 310,900 copies in 2010. It had a circulation of 154,900 copies in 2014.

The journalistic quality of Aftonbladet and other tabloid newspapers has sometimes been questioned. In late 2006, the paper's own journalist Peter Kadhammar criticized the paper's treatment of the love life of Swedish tabloid celebrity Linda Rosing as equally important to the war in Iraq. However, Aftonbladet has drawn more attention for the strident left-wing stance and controversial publications of its cultural section. Under former culture editor Åsa Linderborg, the cultural section was criticized by pro-Israel groups for taking an anti-Israeli stance, and in some instances Linderborg was accused of publishing opinion pieces that alluded to anti-Semitic concepts. Linderborg was also criticized over a series of articles relating to Russia, and there have been persistent allegations that the cultural section has promoted pro-Moscow narratives, including on the Russo-Ukrainian War. Linderborg denied the accusations. However, after sparking yet another round of Russia-related controversy, she resigned in 2019.

== Internet publishing ==
Aftonbladet was an early adopter of Internet publishing. It has been published on the World Wide Web since 25 August 1994, and the main news service is free. Since its inception, aftonbladet.se has consistently been rated as one of the five most visited Swedish websites in various surveys.

== See also ==
- List of newspapers in Sweden
