= Gustaf Hellström =

Swedish writer and journalist (1882–1953)

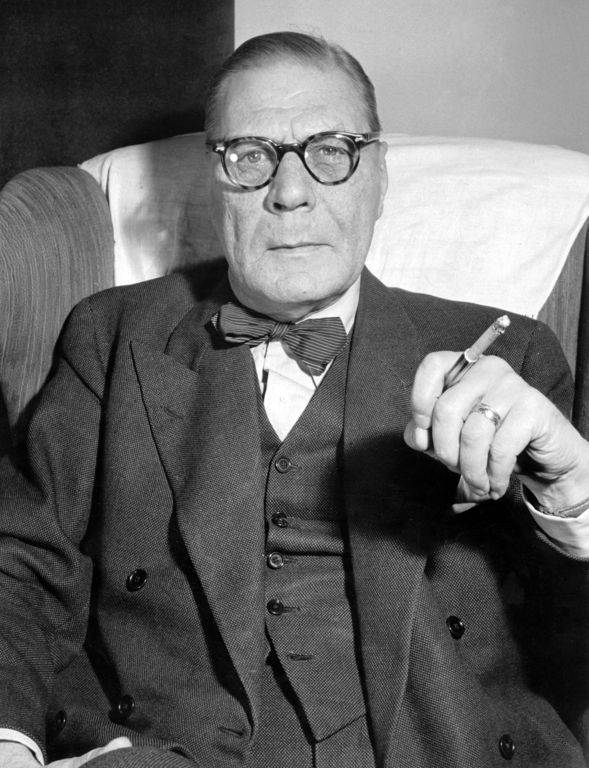
- Born: 28 August 1882; Kristianstad, Scania, Sweden
- Died: 27 February 1953 (aged 70); Stockholm, Sweden
- Occupations: Novelist; journalist; literary critic

Gustaf Hellström, born 28 August 1882 in Kristianstad, died 27 February 1953 in Stockholm, was a Swedish novelist, journalist and literary critic.

== Biography ==
Hellström worked as a foreign correspondent for the newspaper Dagens Nyheter. He lived in London, Paris and New York City between 1906 and 1935, and these cities influenced much of his early fiction. His best known work, however, deals with Swedish themes. Snörmakare Lekholm får en idé (1927; "Lacemaker Lekholm Has an Idea"), considered his masterpiece, is a family chronicle covering three generations of life in a provincial garrison town. Hellström also wrote a fictionalized autobiography, Stellan Petreus: en man utan humor (1921–52; "Stellan Petreus: A Man Without Humour"), many novels and collections of short stories. His journalism was collected in several books.

In 1936–1942, he was chairman of the Swedish PEN. In 1942 he was elected a member of the Swedish Academy.

Cultural offices
Preceded by Gunnar Mascoll Silfverstolpe	Swedish Academy, Seat No.18; 1942–1953	Succeeded by Bertil Malmberg
