= Gunnar Mascoll Silfverstolpe =

Swedish poet (1893–1942)

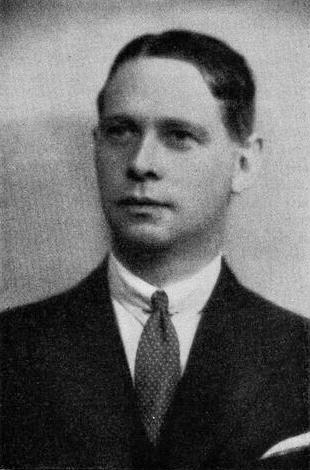
- Born: 21 January 1893; Rytterne parish, Sweden
- Died: 26 June 1942 (aged 49); Stockholm, Sweden
- Occupations: Poet, art historian, translator, critic

Member of the Swedish Academy (Seat No. 18)
- In office 20 December 1941 – 26 June 1942
- Preceded by: Albert Engström
- Succeeded by: Gustaf Hellström

Oscar Gunnar Mascoll Silfverstolpe (21 January 1893 – 26 June 1942) was a Swedish poet, translator, and member of the Swedish Academy.

== Biography ==
Silfverstolpe was born in Rytterne, Västmanland County. He was the son of army captain Carl Edvard Mascoll Silfverstolpe and Elsa Maria Gagge. Following his matriculation examination (studentexamen) in 1911, he entered Uppsala University and studied art history. He graduated with a BA 1914 and a licentiate degree 1919. In 1918, he began working at the Royal Collections (Kungliga Husgerådskammaren). He rose to become the head of this department in 1936.

Silfverstolpe was secretary of the Bellman Society 1919–1934, and chairman from 1940. He was a board member of the Swedish PEN Club from 1922. He was elected to chair 18 of the Swedish Academy in 1941.

In 1940, Silfverstolpe underwent surgery to treat cancer. His condition worsened in spring 1942 and he died on 26 June. Silfverstolpe died just half a year after joining the Swedish Academy, which makes his tenure the shortest of any member to date.

== Bibliography ==
=== Poetry ===
- The Heritage (Arvet, 1919)
- Daylight (Dagsljus, 1923)
- Everyday (Vardag, 1926)
- Afterwards (Efteråt, 1932)
- Homeland (Hemland, 1940)

=== Art history ===
- Prins Eugens konst (1935)
- Det tessinska slottet (with R. Josephson and J. Böttiger, 1940)

=== Translations ===
- Vers från väster (with K. Asplund, poetry from late Victorian, Edwardian, and Georgian eras, 1922)
- Skattkammarön (Treasure Island by R.L. Stevenson, 1941)

Cultural offices
Preceded by Albert Engström	Swedish Academy, Seat No.18; 1941–1942	Succeeded by Gustaf Hellström
