= Nils Hasselskog =

Swedish poet, writer and humourist

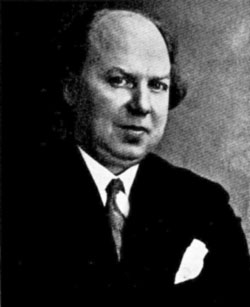
Nils Hasselskog.

Nils Hasselskog (1892–1936) was a Swedish poet, writer and humourist. He debuted as a writer for Grönköpings Veckoblad in 1925. Hasselskog's years at the magazine are considered its artistic peak. He was the creator of the parody language Transpiranto.
