= Transpiranto =

Constructed language

- Created by: Grönköpings Veckoblad
- Date: 1929
- Setting and usage: Swedish anthology
- Purpose: jest: int. auxiliary languages; Transpiranto

Language codes
- ISO 639-3: None (mis)
- Glottolog: None

Transpiranto is a parody language, a caricature of the international auxiliary language Esperanto. The name contains a play on the Swedish verb transpirera, to perspire. The parody language was developed from 1929 by contributors to the publication Grönköpings Veckoblad ('the Greenville Weekly', a Swedish satirical monthly), through a series of comical translations of well-known Scandinavian songs and poems, more than 200 in all. The first two Transpiranto poems were written by Nils Hasselskog.

In recent years, several poems originally written in Esperanto have been rendered into Transpiranto by Martin Weichert, and have been published in the Swedish Esperanto journal La Espero, and via the internet.

Texts in Transpiranto consist of short phrases taken straight from English, German, French, Spanish, Italian and Latin, alternating with more strictly Esperanto-like fragments, and with Swedish slang.

Esperanto and Transpiranto have been compared by the linguist Bengt Sigurd, a contributor to a Swedish anthology about language issues.

== See also ==
- Esperanto
- Europanto
