= Augusta Barthelson =

Swedish writer (1833–1929)

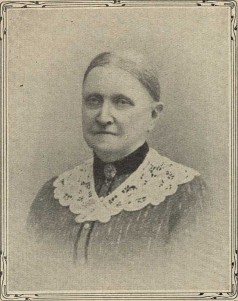
- Augusta in the newspaper, 1913
- Born: 9 September 1833; Drottningholm Palace
- Died: 2 March 1929 (aged 95); St Görans Church Parish
- Occupation: Author
- Spouse: Fredrik Barthelson

Augusta Sofia Barthelson (9 October 1833 – 2 March 1929) was a Swedish writer. She contributed regularly to several Swedish newspapers, including Aftonbladet, Söndags-Nisse and Nya Dagligt Allehanda. In 1885, she published the book Efterspel, which achieved considerable popularity for the time.

== Biography ==
Barthelson was born the daughter of the chamber warden N. Hultgren and his wife Johanna Rundqvist in the Drottningholm Palace. She married, in 1870, the treasurer of the Generalpoststyrelsen, Fredrik Barthelson. Her husband was also active as a writer and co-founded the literary society Fratres amicitiae veroe, which included Carl Snoilsky among others.

Barthelson wrote shorter stories that were published in daily and weekly newspapers, including Aftonbladet, Söndags-Nisse and Nya Dagligt Allehanda. She also wrote verses for the silver wedding of Oscar II and Sofia of Nassau. For this she was awarded the Royal Couple's Commemorative Medal. In addition, she wrote a variety of plays that have never been published, including An emancipated home (1860s) and Father-in-law and son-in-law (1890s). Her only work published in book form is the drama Efterspel (1885). The play was a direct continuation of Alfhild Agrell's Doomed, which was also the main reason why the Dramaten rejected the work when it was submitted there for reading.

In connection with Barthelson's 80th birthday in 1913, a portrait of her was written in the newspaper Idun. The Barthelsons had an extensive autograph collection. This was later sold and is now at Uppsala University Library.
