= Grönköpings Veckoblad =

Satirical magazine in Sweden

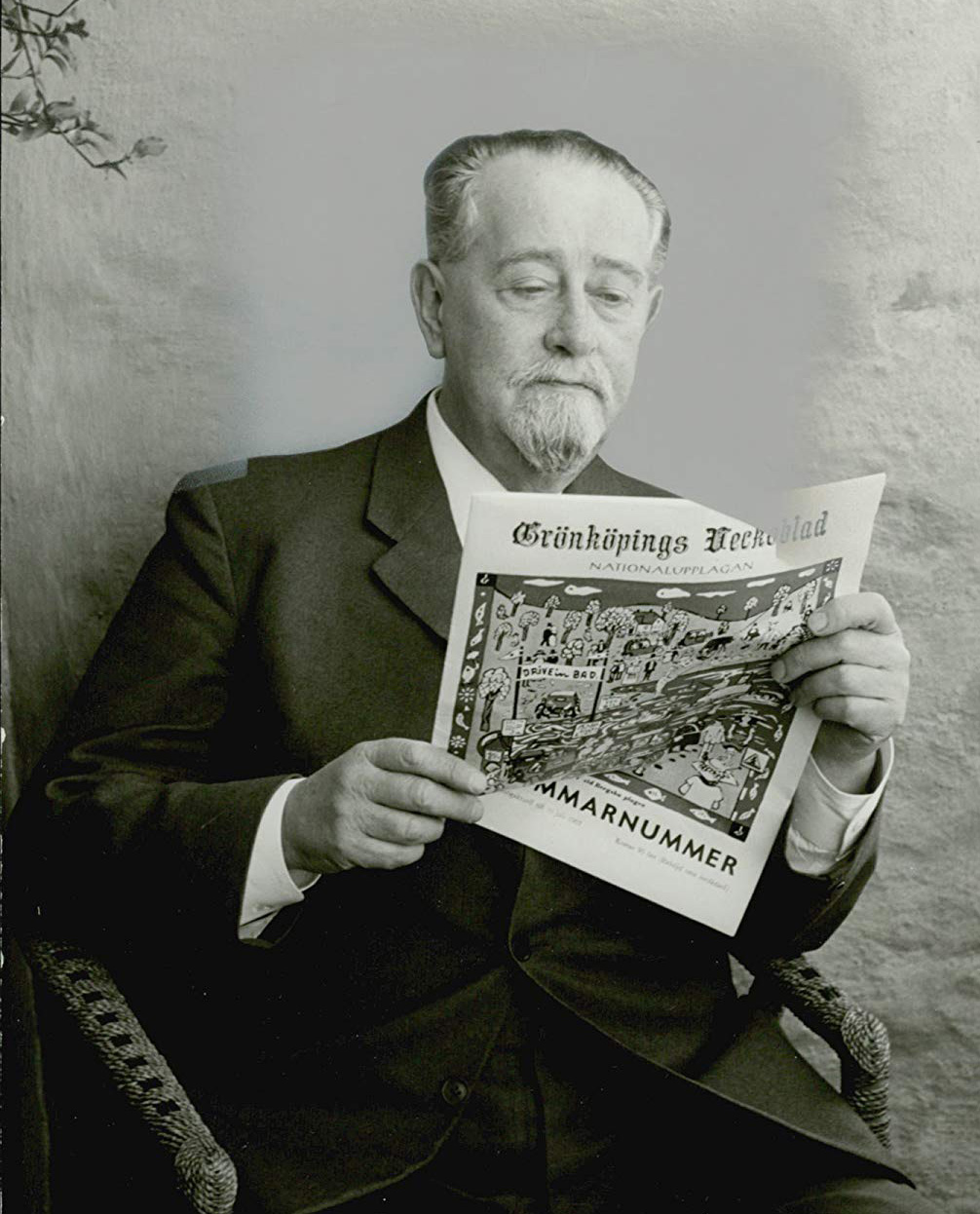
- Editor Seth Bremberg reading the magazine
- Categories: Satirical magazine
- Frequency: Monthly
- Founder: Hasse Zetterström
- Founded: 1902
- Country: Sweden
- Based in: Stockholm
- Language: Swedish
- Website: https://gronkoping.nu/
- ISSN: 0017-4548
- OCLC: 497440061

Grönköpings Veckoblad is a Swedish satirical monthly magazine. The name translates as "The Grönköping Weekly", or "The Greenville Weekly", Grönköping being a fictional Swedish town. The name Grönköping predates the magazine; it was first used by Albert Engström as a headline for some of his drawings in 1895.

== History and profile ==
Founded in 1902 by Hasse Zetterström as a supplement to Söndags-Nisse, it became an independent magazine in 1916. As of 2008 the editor in chief of the magazine was Ulf Schöldström. The magazine is based in Stockholm.

The parody language Transpiranto, a caricature of Esperanto, was introduced in a 1929 article by Nils Hasselskog, "World language in Grönköping's school" ("Världsspråk i Grönköpings skola").

Grönköping has been characterized as a Sweden in miniature. Using bombastic and anachronistic language while purporting to describe and analyse current events in a serious manner, Grönköpings Veckoblad has become a Swedish institution and a standard for what is considered good satire.

The declared editorial stance is that they "always agree with the government, especially when they are wrong."

== See also ==
- Blandaren
