= Hasse Zetterström =

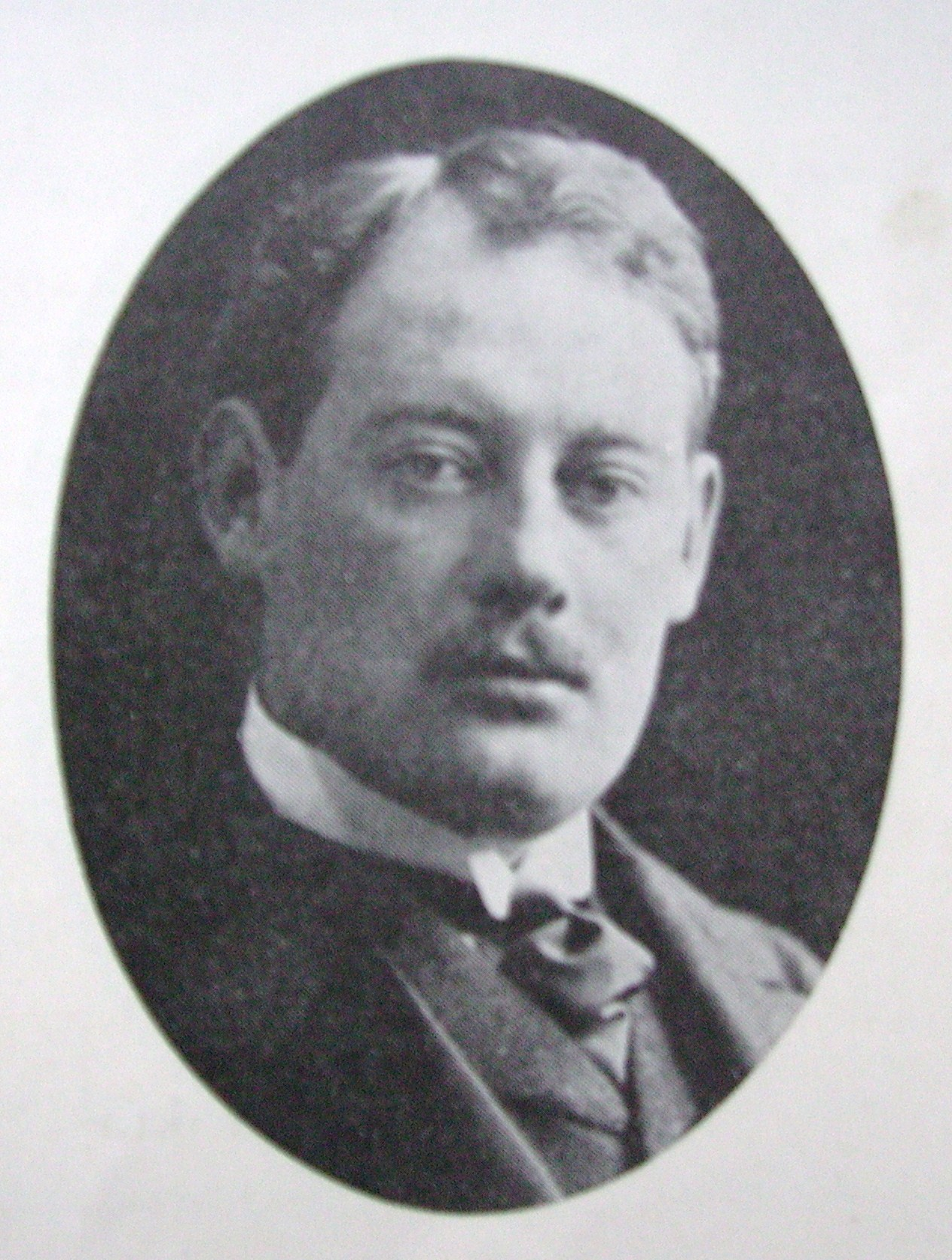
- Born: Hans Harald "Hasse" Zetterström; 23 May 1877; Stockholm, Sweden
- Died: 1 June 1946 (aged 69)
- Occupations: author, columnist, editor
- Known for: use of many writing pseudonyms
- Spouse: Anna Ahlberg (m. 1901)
- Children: 2 sons
- Parents: August Zetterström (father); Elisabet Zetterström (née Carlberg) (mother)

Hans Harald "Hasse" Zetterström (23 May 1877 – 1 June 1946) was a Swedish author, columnist and editor

Hasse was born 23 May 1877 in Stockholm, Sweden, to father August Zetterström and mother Elisabet Zetterström (née Carlberg). 1 June 1946.

Hasse was noted for his use of many writing pseudonyms. At the age of 20 he began working on the magazine Figaro and in 1897 started working at newspaper Söndags Nisse working in a variety of roles until becoming the editor of Söndags Nisse-Strix in 1924. As editor he commissioned the creation of the satirical magazine Grönköpings Veckoblad, detailing the fictional Swedish town of Grönköping. Hasse also began contributing a regular column in 1931 to major national Swedish newspaper Svenska Dagbladet.

Hasse married Anna Ahlberg in 1901 and became a father to Erik Zetterström (1904–1997) and Sven Zetterström (1902–1973). Erik became a notable journalist and columnist for Svenska Dagbladet under the pseudonym of Kar de Mumma whilst Sven was a screenwriter and journalist.

== Novels ==
- Anna-Clara och hennes bröder 1917
- Ljus
- Något mildare
- Se nästa sida!
- Samlade historier I-II
- Sex berättelser om julen
- Den lilla gåtan
- Fattiga Riddare
- Andersson, Oskar: Mannen som gör vad som faller honom in
