= Söndags-Nisse =

Humour magazine in Sweden (1862–1924)

- Categories: Humor
- Founder: Gustaf Wahlbom
- First issue: 1862
- Final issue: 1924
- Country: Sweden
- Based in: Stockholm
- Language: Swedish
- OCLC: 185994667

Söndags-Nisse (Swedish: Sunday Nisse) was a humor magazine published in Stockholm, Sweden. It was in circulation between 1863 and 1924.

== History and profile ==
1923 cartoon from Söndags-Nisse that touches on the Occupation of the Ruhr by France.

Söndags-Nisse was founded by Gustaf Wahlbom in 1862. The magazine contributed to the career of cartoonist Oskar Andersson who published comic strips in the magazine in 1897. Other contributors to the magazine include Carl Larsson, Jenny Nyström and Augusta Barthelson.

Grönköpings Veckoblad, a satirical political magazine, started as a section of Söndags-Nisse in 1902. Söndags-Nisse ceased publication in 1924.

Original drawing of Gustaf Wahlbom published in the magazine is archived in the national museum of Sweden.
