= Asia =

Continent

- Area: 44,579,000 km^{2} (17,212,000 sq mi) (1st)
- Population: ▲4,695,000,000 (2021; 1st)
- Population density: 100/km^{2} (260/sq mi)
- GDP (PPP): $94.66 trillion (2025 est; 1st)
- GDP (nominal): $41.02 trillion (2025 est; 1st)
- GDP per capita: $9,180 (2025 est; 5th)
- Religions: Islam (28.0%); Hinduism (22.8%); No religion (13.9%); Buddhism (11.1%); Chinese folk religion (9.7%); Christianity (8.4%); Ethnic religions (3.5%); New religions (1.3%); Other (1.3%)
- Demonym: Asian
- Countries: 49 UN members; 1 UN observer; 4 other states
- Dependencies: List: Akrotiri and Dhekelia; British Indian Ocean Territory; Christmas Island; Cocos (Keeling) Islands; Hong Kong; Macau
- Non-UN states: List: Abkhazia; Northern Cyprus; Palestine; South Ossetia; Taiwan
- Languages: List of languages
- Time zone: UTC+02:00 to UTC+12:00
- Internet TLD: .asia
- Largest cities: List of metropolitan areas; Lists of cities
- UN M49 codes: 142 – Asia; 001 – World

Asia (/ˈeɪʒə/ AY-zhə, UK also /ˈeɪʃə/ AY-shə) is the largest continent (Note: Asia is normally considered its own continent in the English speaking world, which uses the seven continent model. Other models consider Asia as part of a Eurasian or Afro-Eurasian continent (see Continent § Number).) in the world by both land area and population. It covers an area of more than 44 million square kilometres, (Note: 44,579,000 square kilometres (17,212,000 square miles)) about 30% of Earth's total land area and 8% of Earth's total surface area. The continent, which has long been home to the majority of the human population, was the site of many of the first civilisations. Its 4.7 billion people constitute roughly 60% of the world's population.

Asia shares the landmass of Eurasia with Europe, and of Afro-Eurasia with both Europe and Africa. In general terms, it is bounded on the east by the Pacific Ocean, on the south by the Indian Ocean, and on the north by the Arctic Ocean. The border of Asia with Europe is a historical and cultural construct, as there is no clear physical and geographical separation between them. A commonly accepted division places Asia to the east of the Suez Canal separating it from Africa; and to the east of the Turkish straits, the Ural Mountains and Ural River, and to the south of the Caucasus Mountains and the Caspian and Black seas, separating it from Europe.

Since the concept of Asia derives from the term for the eastern region from a European perspective, Asia is the remaining vast area of Eurasia minus Europe. Therefore, Asia is a region where various independent cultures coexist rather than sharing a single culture, and its boundary with Europe is somewhat arbitrary and has moved since its first conception in classical antiquity. The division of Eurasia into two continents reflects East–West cultural differences, some of which vary on a spectrum.

China and India traded places as the largest economies in the world from 1 to 1800 CE. The Silk Road became the main east–west trading route in the Asian hinterlands while the Straits of Malacca stood as a major sea route. Asia has exhibited economic dynamism as well as robust population growth during the 20th century, but overall population growth has since fallen. Asia was the birthplace of most of the world's mainstream religions including Islam, Judaism, Christianity, Hinduism, Buddhism, and many other religions.

Asia varies greatly across and within its regions with regard to ethnic groups, cultures, environments, economics, historical ties, and government systems. It also has a mix of many different climates ranging from the equatorial south via the hot deserts in parts of West Asia, Central Asia, South Asia, and East Asia and tropical jungles in Southeast Asia, temperate areas in the east and the continental centre to vast subarctic and polar areas in North Asia.

== Etymology ==
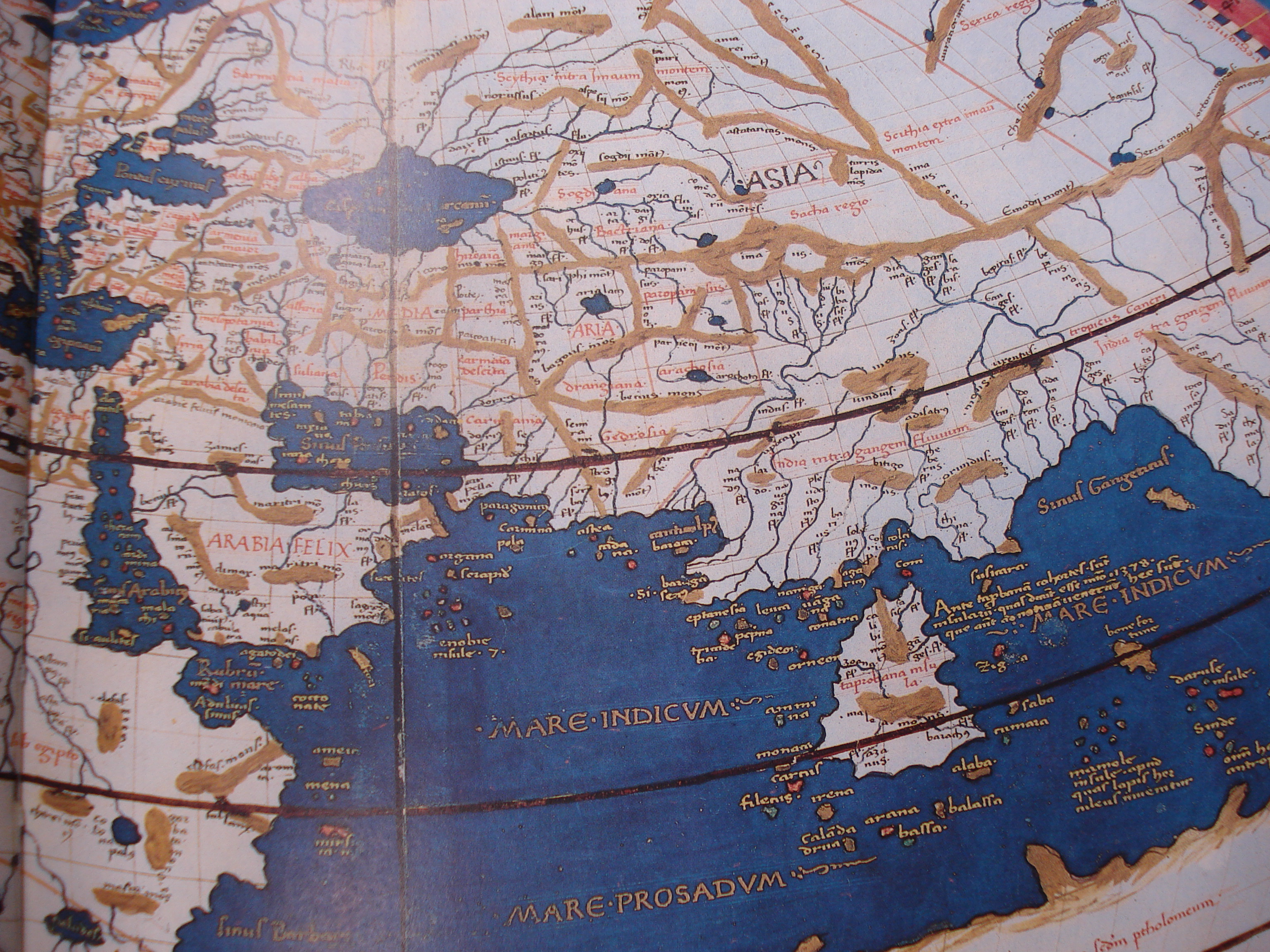
Ptolemy's Asia

The term "Asia" is believed to originate in the Bronze Age toponym Assuwa (Hittite: 𒀸𒋗𒉿, romanized: aš-šu-wa) which originally referred only to a portion of northwestern Anatolia. The term appears in Hittite records recounting how a confederation of Assuwan states including Troy unsuccessfully rebelled against the Hittite king Tudhaliya I around 1400 BCE. Roughly contemporary Linear B documents contain the term aswia (Mycenaean Greek: 𐀀𐀯𐀹𐀊, romanized: a-si-wi-ja), seemingly in reference to captives from the same area.

The province of Asia within the Roman Empire

Herodotus used the term in reference to Anatolia and the territory of the Achaemenid Empire, in contrast to Greece and Egypt. He reports that Greeks assumed that Asia was named after the wife of Prometheus, but that Lydians say it was named after Asies, son of Cotys, who passed the name on to a tribe at Sardis. In Greek mythology, "Asia" (Ἀσία or Ἀσίη) was the name of a "Nymph or Titan goddess of Lydia". The Iliad (attributed by the ancient Greeks to Homer) mentions two Phrygians in the Trojan War named Asios (literally 'Asian'); and also a marsh or lowland containing a marsh in Lydia as ασιος.

The term was later adopted by the Romans, who used it in reference to the province of Asia, located in western Anatolia. One of the first writers to use Asia as a name of the whole continent was Pliny.

== Definition ==
=== Asia–Europe boundary ===
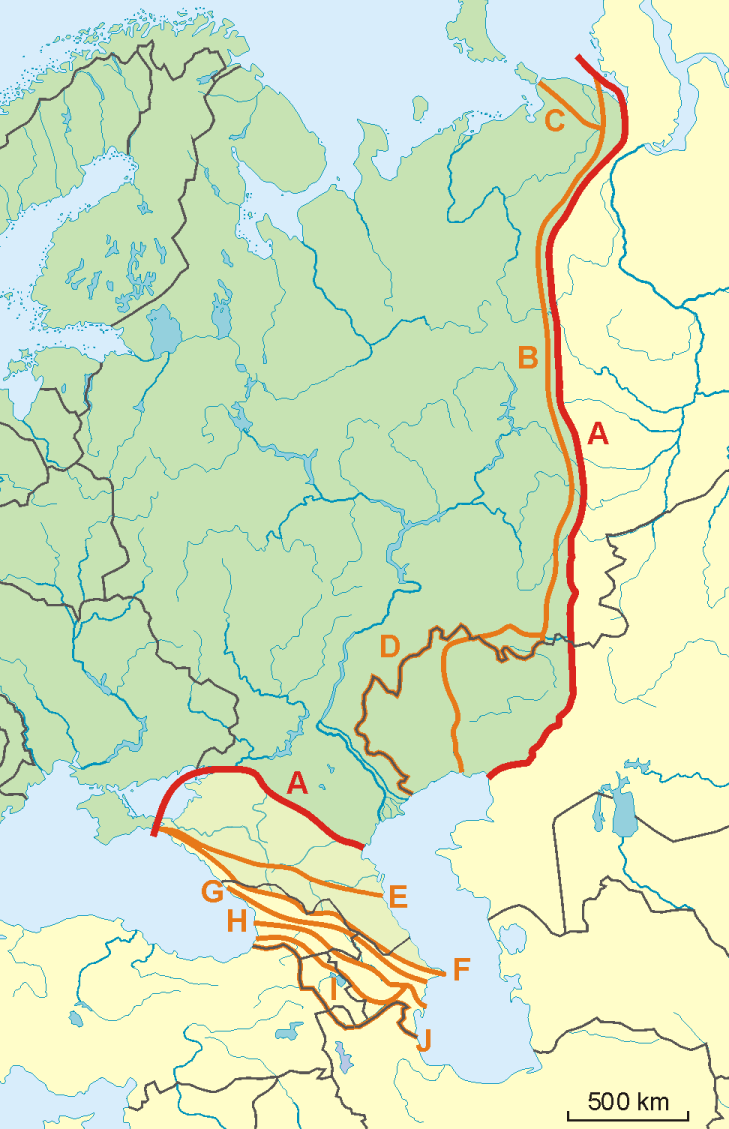
Definitions used for the boundary between Asia and Europe in different periods of history. Modern definitions mostly fit with lines B and F given.

The threefold division of the Old World into Africa, Asia, and Europe has been in use since the 6th century BCE, due to Greek geographers such as Anaximander and Hecataeus. Anaximander placed the boundary between Asia and Europe along the Phasis River (now the Rioni) in Georgia of Caucasus (from its mouth by Poti on the Black Sea coast, through the Surami Pass and along the Kura River to the Caspian Sea), a convention still followed by Herodotus in the 5th century BCE. During the Hellenistic period, this convention was revised, and the boundary between Europe and Asia was now considered to be the Tanais (the modern Don River). This is the convention used by Roman era authors such as Posidonius, Strabo and Ptolemy.

The border between Asia and Europe was later redefined by European academics. In 1730, five years after the death of Peter the Great, Philip Johan von Strahlenberg published in Sweden a new atlas proposing the Ural Mountains as the border of Asia. Vasily Tatishchev announced that he had proposed the idea to von Strahlenberg. The latter had suggested the Emba River as the southern part of this boundary. Over the next century various proposals were made until the Ural River prevailed in the mid-19th century. The border had been moved perforce from the Black Sea (the Romans' definition) to the Caspian Sea into which the Emba and Ural rivers project. Between the Black Sea and the Caspian, the border is often placed along the crest of the Caucasus Mountains, although it is sometimes placed further north, on the Kuma–Manych Depression.

=== Asia–Africa boundary ===
The boundary between Asia and Africa is the Suez Canal, the Gulf of Suez, the Red Sea, and the Bab-el-Mandeb. This makes Egypt a transcontinental country, with the Sinai Peninsula in Asia and the remainder of the country in Africa.

=== Asia–Oceania boundary ===
Definitions of the boundary between Asia and Oceania

The border between Asia and Oceania is usually placed somewhere in the Indonesian Archipelago, specifically in Eastern Indonesia. The Wallace Line separates the Asian and Wallacea biogeographical realms, a transition zone of deep water straits between the Asian and Australian continental shelves. Weber's Line split the region in two with regard to the balance of fauna between Asian origin or Australo-Papuan origin. Wallacea's eastern boundary with Sahul is represented by the Lydekker's Line. The Maluku Islands (except the Aru Islands) are often considered to lie on the border of southeast Asia, with the Aru Islands and Western New Guinea, to the east of the Lydekker's Line, being wholly part of Oceania, as both lie on the Australian continental plate. Culturally, the Wallacea region denoted the transition between Austronesian and Melanesian people, with varying degrees of intermixing between the two. In general, the further west and coastal a region is, the stronger the Austronesian influences, and the further east and inland a region is, the stronger the Melanesian influences. The terms Southeast Asia and Oceania, devised in the 19th century, have had several vastly different geographic meanings since their inception. The chief factor in determining which islands of the Indonesian Archipelago are Asian has been the location of the colonial possessions of the various empires there (not all European). Lewis and Wigen assert, "The narrowing of 'Southeast Asia' to its present boundaries was thus a gradual process."

=== Asia–North America boundary ===
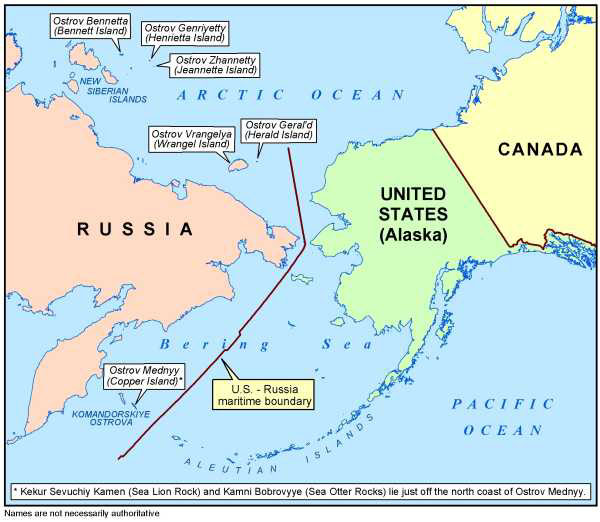
The United States–Russia border according to the USSR–USA Maritime Boundary Agreement

The Bering Strait and Bering Sea separate the landmasses of Asia and North America, as well as forming the international boundary between Russia and the United States. This national and continental boundary separates the Diomede Islands in the Bering Strait, with Big Diomede in Russia and Little Diomede in the United States. The Aleutian Islands are an island chain extending westward from the Alaskan Peninsula toward Russia's Komandorski Islands and Kamchatka Peninsula. Most of them are always associated with North America, except for the westernmost Near Islands group, which is on Asia's continental shelf beyond the North Aleutians Basin and on rare occasions could be associated with Asia, which could then allow the United States to be considered a transcontinental state. The Aleutian Islands are sometimes associated with Oceania, owing to their status as remote Pacific islands, and their proximity to the Pacific Plate. This is extremely rare however, due to their non-tropical biogeography, as well as their inhabitants, who have historically been related to the Indigenous peoples of the Americas.

St. Lawrence Island in the northern Bering Sea belongs to the US state of Alaska and may be associated with either continent but is almost always considered part of North America, as with the Rat Islands in the Aleutian chain. At their nearest points, Alaska and Russia are separated by only 4 kilometres (2.5 miles).

=== Ongoing definition ===
Afro-Eurasia

Geographical Asia is a cultural artifact of European conceptions of the world, beginning with the Ancient Greeks, being imposed onto other cultures, an imprecise concept causing endemic contention about what it means. Asia does not exactly correspond to the cultural borders of its various types of constituents.

From the time of Herodotus, a minority of geographers have rejected the three-continent system (Europe, Africa, Asia) on the grounds that there is no substantial physical separation between them. For example, Sir Barry Cunliffe, the emeritus professor of European archeology at Oxford, argues that Europe has been geographically and culturally merely "the western excrescence of the continent of Asia".

Geographically, Asia is the major eastern constituent of the continent of Eurasia with Europe being a northwestern peninsula of the landmass. Asia, Europe and Africa make up a single continuous landmass—Afro-Eurasia—and share a common continental shelf. Almost all of Europe and a major part of Asia sit atop the Eurasian Plate, adjoined on the south by the Arabian and Indian Plate and with the easternmost part of Siberia (east of the Chersky Range) on the North American Plate.

== History ==
=== Prehistory ===
Map of early human migrations based on the Out of Africa theory.

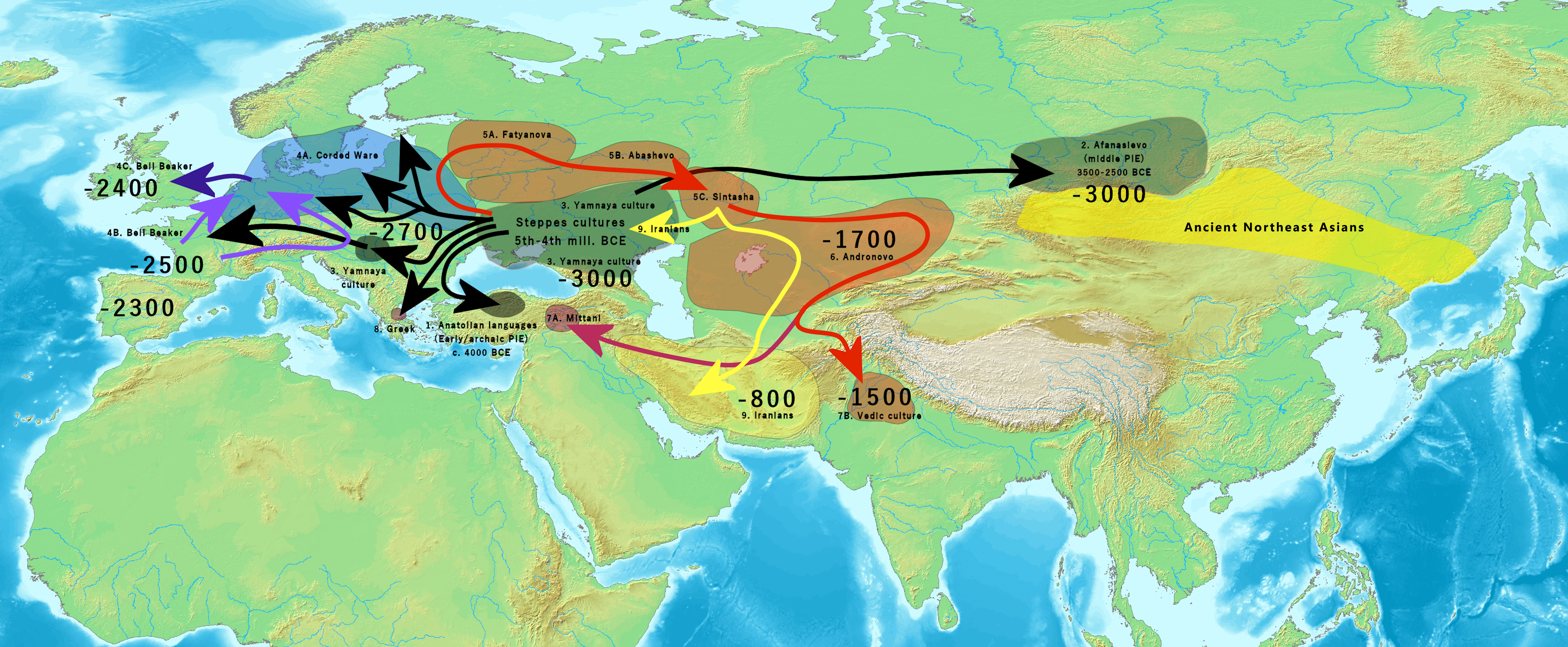
Early Indo-European migrations from the Pontic steppes and across Central Asia, and encounter with Ancient Northeast Asian populations.

About 1.8 million years ago, Homo erectus left the African continent. This species is believed to have lived in East and Southeast Asia from 1.8 million to 110,000 years ago."Homo erectus". The Smithsonian Institution's Human Origins Program. Smithsonian National Museum of Natural History. 3 January 2024.

Researchers believe that the modern human, or Homo sapiens, migrated about 60,000 years ago to South Asia along the Indian Ocean. Modern humans interbred with an archaic human species called Denisovans in Southeast Asia. Before the arrival of modern humans, Flores was occupied by Homo floresiensis, a small archaic human.

Ancestors of East Eurasians split from Ancient West Eurasians about 46,000 years ago, migrating out of the hub in the Iranian Plateau. Evidence from full genomic studies suggests that the first people in the Americas diverged from Ancient East Asians about 36,000 years ago and expanded northwards into Siberia, where they encountered and interacted with a different Paleolithic Siberian population (known as Ancient North Eurasians), giving rise to both Paleosiberian peoples and Ancient Native Americans.

Modern South Asians are descendants of a combination of Western Eurasian ancestries (notably Neolithic Iranian and Western Steppe Herder components) with a proposed indigenous East Eurasian component (termed Ancient Ancestral South Indians) closest to the non–West Eurasian part extracted from South Asian samples; distantly related to the Andamanese peoples, East Asians and Aboriginal Australians.

=== Ancient era ===
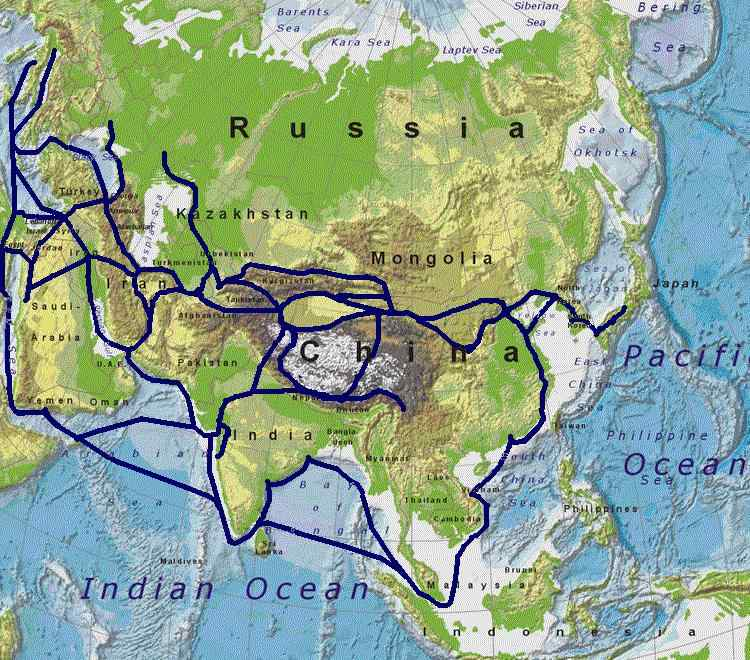
The Silk Road connected civilisations across Asia.

The history of Asia can be seen as the distinct histories of several peripheral coastal regions: East Asia, South Asia, Southeast Asia, Central Asia, and West Asia. The coastal periphery was home to some of the world's earliest known civilisations, each of them developing around fertile river valleys. The civilisations in Mesopotamia, the Indus Valley and the Yellow River shared many similarities. These civilisations may well have exchanged technologies and ideas such as mathematics and the wheel. Other innovations, such as writing, seem to have been developed individually in each area. Cities, states and empires developed in these lowlands.

The central steppe region had long been inhabited by horse-mounted nomads who could reach all areas of Asia from the steppes. The earliest postulated expansion out of the steppe is that of the Indo-Europeans, who spread their languages into West Asia, South Asia, and the borders of China, where the Tocharians resided. The northernmost part of Asia, including much of Siberia, was largely inaccessible to the steppe nomads, owing to the dense forests, climate and tundra. These areas remained very sparsely populated.

The center and the peripheries were mostly kept separated by mountains and deserts. The Caucasus and Himalaya mountains and the Karakum and Gobi deserts formed barriers that the steppe horsemen could cross only with difficulty. While the urban city dwellers were more advanced technologically and socially, in many cases they could do little in a military aspect to defend against the mounted hordes of the steppe. However, the lowlands did not have enough open grasslands to support a large equestrian force; for this and other reasons, the nomads who conquered states in China, India, and the Middle East often found themselves adapting to the local, more affluent societies.

=== Medieval era ===
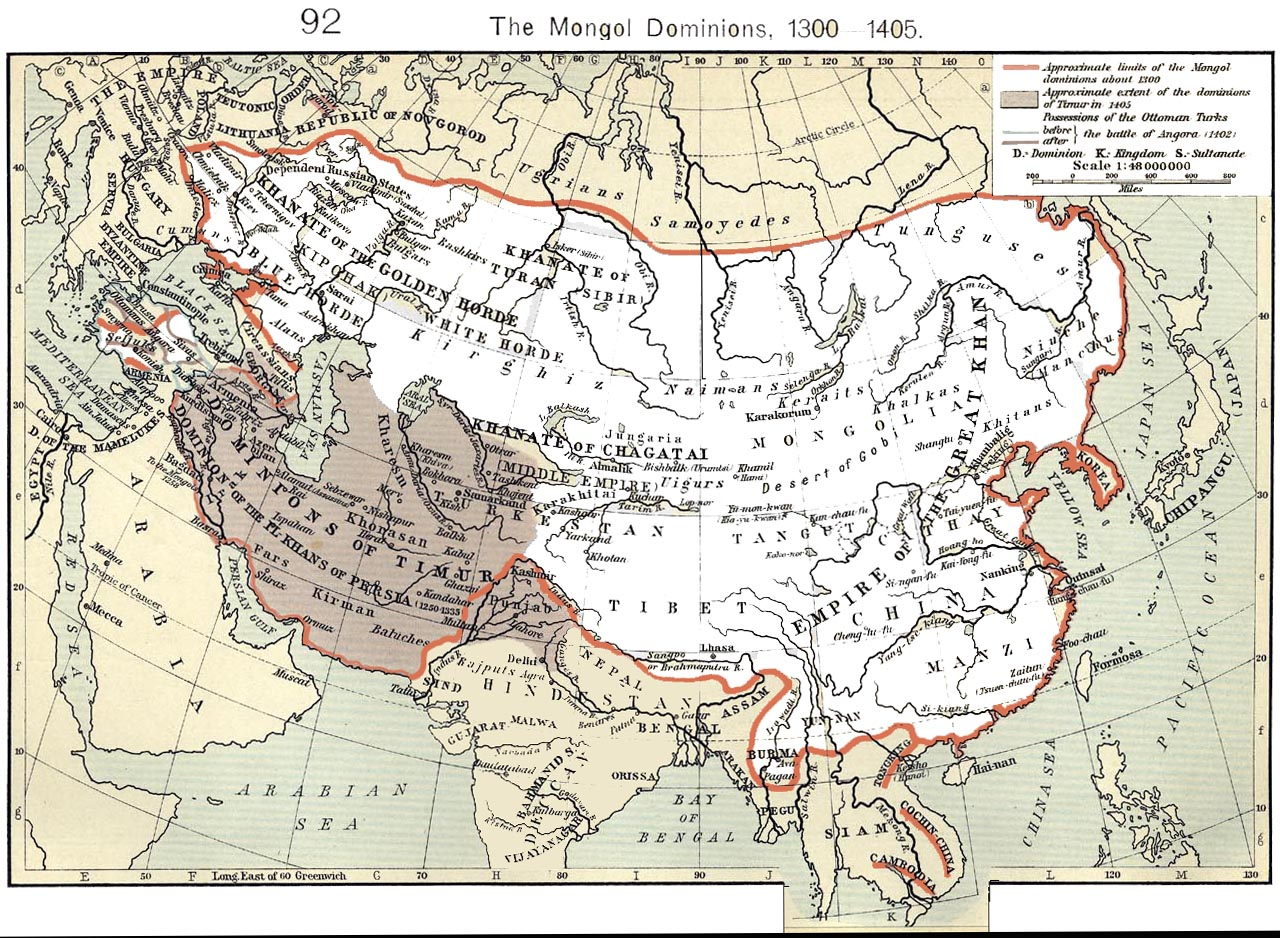
The Mongol Empire at its greatest extent. The gray area is the later Timurid Empire.

The Islamic Caliphate's defeats of the Byzantine and Persian empires led to West Asia and southern parts of Central Asia and western parts of South Asia under its control during its conquests of the 7th century; Islam also spread over centuries to the southern regions of India and Southeast Asia through trade along the Maritime Silk Road. The Mongol Empire conquered a large part of Asia in the 13th century, an area extending from China to Europe. Before the Mongol invasion, Song dynasty reportedly had approximately 120 million citizens; the 1300 census which followed the invasion reported roughly 60 million people.

The Black Death, one of the most devastating pandemics in human history, is thought to have originated in the arid plains of central Asia, where it then travelled along the Silk Road.

=== Modern era ===
European involvement in Asia became more significant from the Age of Discovery onward, with Iberian-sponsored sailors such as Christopher Columbus and Vasco da Gama paving the way for new routes from Atlantic Europe to Pacific Asia and the Indian Ocean respectively in the late 15th century. The Russian Empire also began to expand into northwestern Asia from the 17th century, and would eventually take control of all of Siberia and most of Central Asia by the end of the 19th century.

Among non-European empires, the Ottoman Empire controlled Anatolia, most of the Middle East, North Africa and the Balkans from the mid 16th century onward, while in the 17th century, the Manchu conquered China and established the Qing dynasty. The Islamic Mughal Empire (preceded by the Delhi Sultanate of the 13th to early 16th century) and the Hindu Maratha Empire controlled much of India in the 16th and 18th centuries respectively.

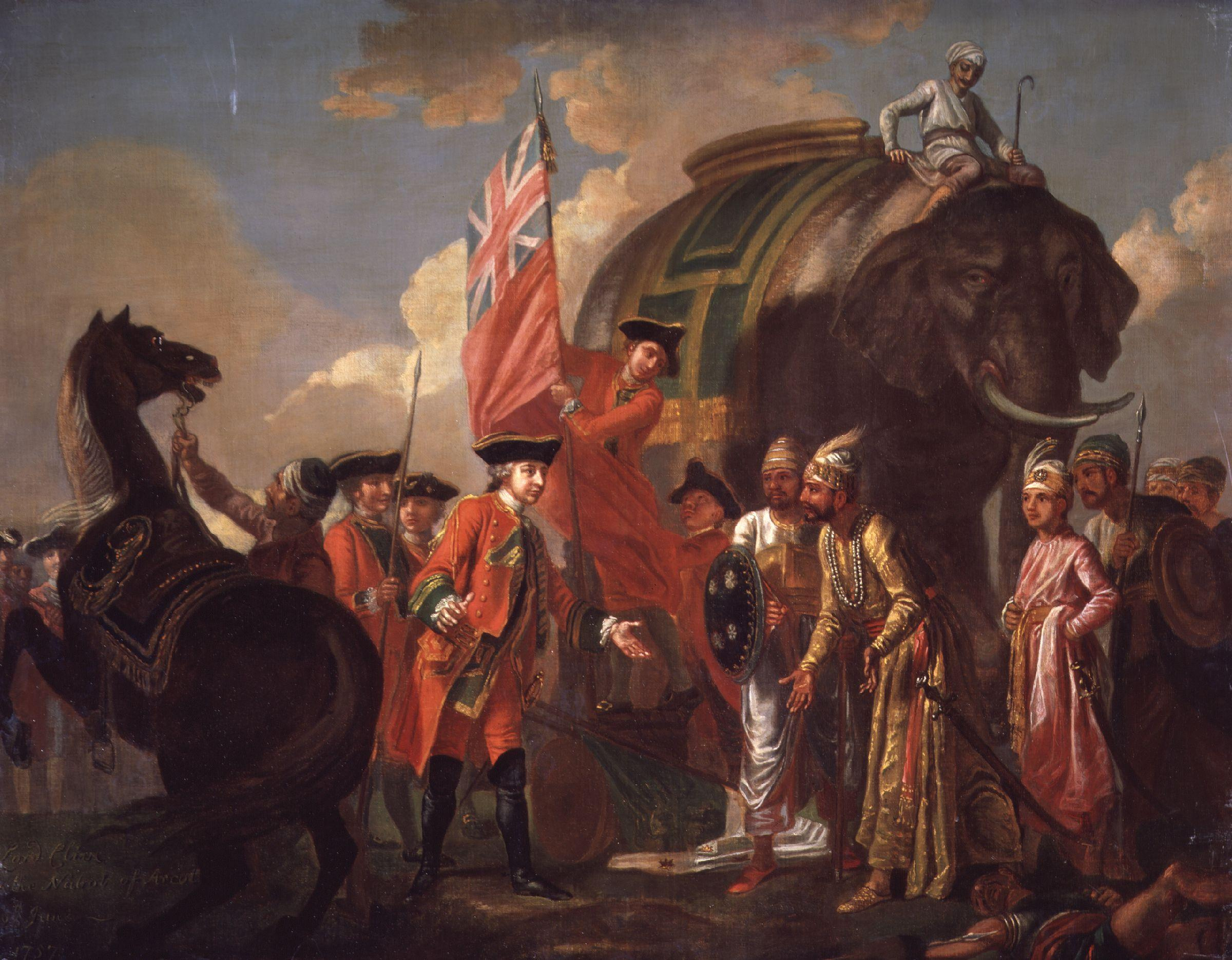
The aftermath of the 1757 Battle of Plassey, which eventually led to British India

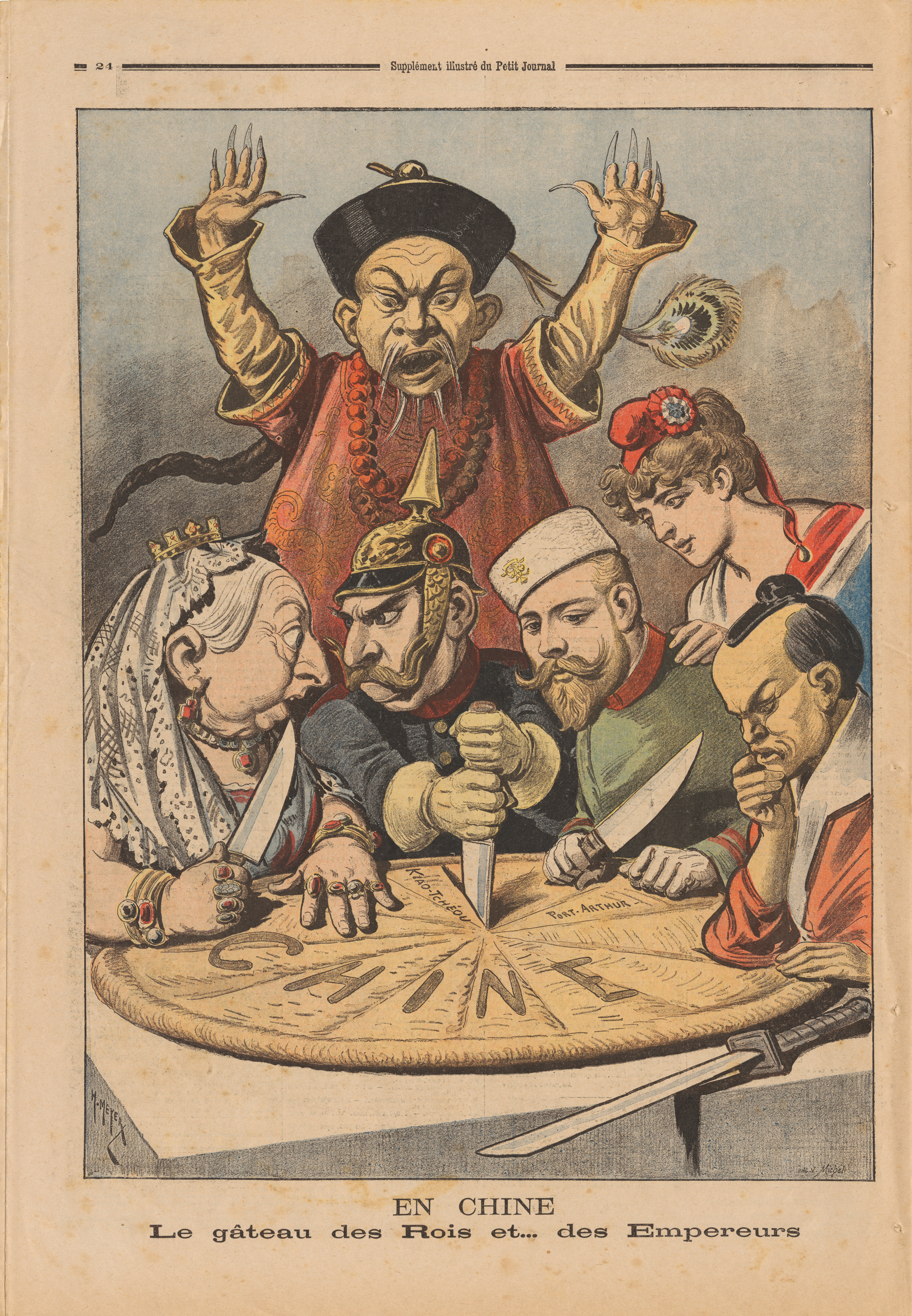
An 1898 depiction of Western powers carving up China

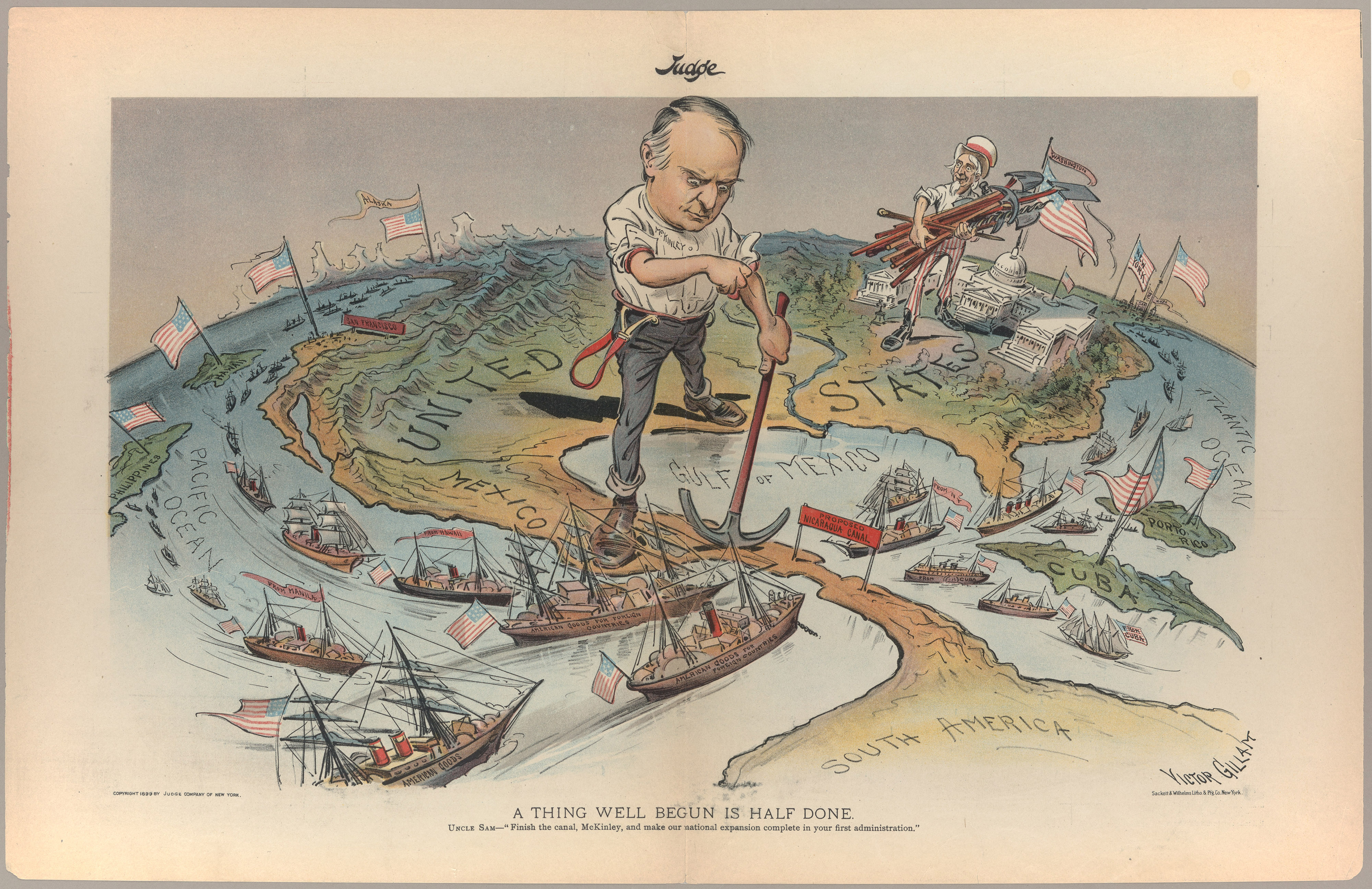
A depiction of America building connections to the Pacific and its Filipino colony (left) after the 1898 Spanish–American War

Western imperialism in Asia from the 18th to 20th centuries coincided with the Industrial Revolution in the West and the dethroning of India and China as the world's foremost economies. The British Empire first became dominant in South Asia, with most of the region being conquered by British traders in the late 18th and early 19th centuries before falling under direct British rule after a failed 1857 revolt; the 1869 completion of the Suez Canal, which increased British access to India, went on to further European influence over Africa and Asia. Around this time, Western powers started to dominate China in what later became known as the century of humiliation, with the British-supported opium trade and later Opium Wars resulting in China being forced into an unprecedented situation of importing more than it exported.

Foreign domination of China was furthered by the Japanese colonial empire, which controlled some of East Asia and briefly much of Southeast Asia (which had earlier been taken over by the British, Dutch and French in the late 19th century), New Guinea and the Pacific islands; Japan's domination was enabled by its rapid rise that had taken place during the Meiji era of the late 19th century, in which it applied industrial knowledge learned from the West and thus overtook the rest of Asia. One significant influence on Japan had been the United States, which had begun projecting influence across the Pacific after its early-to-mid-19th century westward expansion. The breakup of the Ottoman Empire in the early 20th century led to the Middle East also being contested and partitioned by the British and French.

=== Contemporary era ===
The Soviet Union (in red) and China (yellow) controlled most of Asia in the late 20th century.

With the end of World War II in 1945 and the wartime ruination of Europe and imperial Japan, many countries in Asia were able to rapidly free themselves of colonial rule. The independence of India came along with the carving out of a separate nation for the majority of South Asian Muslims, which in 1971 further split into Pakistan and Bangladesh; The Cold War in Asia strained relations between India and Pakistan and affected Asia more generally. The end of the Cold War and the Soviet Union by 1991 saw the independence of the five modern Central Asian countries.

Some Arab countries took economic advantage of massive oil deposits that were discovered in their territory, becoming globally influential, though stability in the Middle East has been affected since 1948 by the Arab–Israeli conflict and American-led interventions. East Asian nations (along with Singapore in Southeast Asia) became economically prosperous with high-growth "tiger economies"; China, having undergone the reform and opening up under Deng Xiaoping, regained its place among the top two economies of the world by the 21st century. India has also grown significantly because of economic liberalisation that started in the 1990s, with extreme poverty now below 20%; India and China's rise has coincided with growing tensions between the two, with the Indo-Pacific now an actively contested area between China and counterbalancing forces.

The threefold division of the Old World into Europe, Asia and Africa has been in use since the 6th century BCE, due to Greek geographers such as Anaximander and Hecataeus.

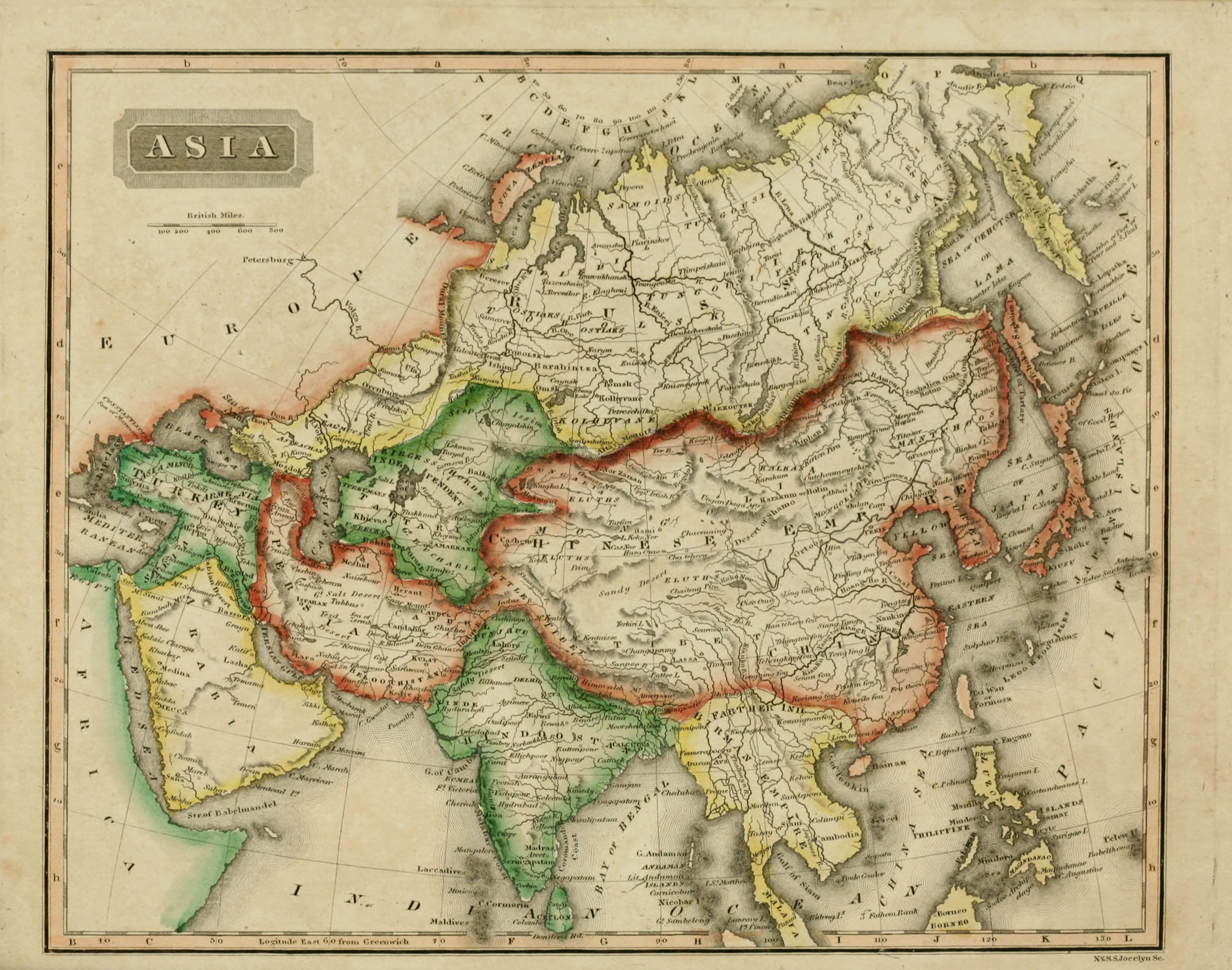
1825 map of Asia by Sidney Edwards Morse

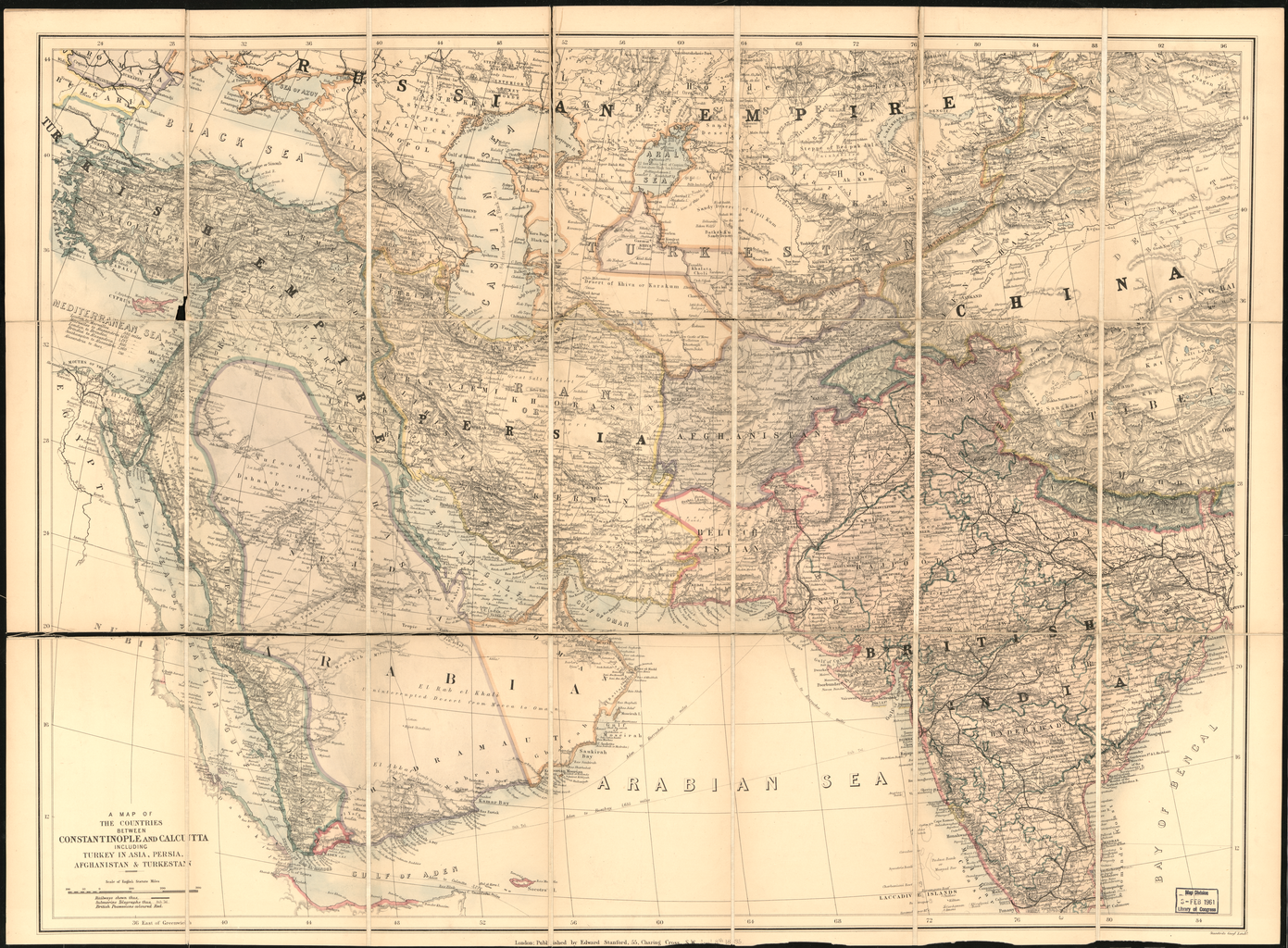
Map of western, southern, and central Asia in 1885

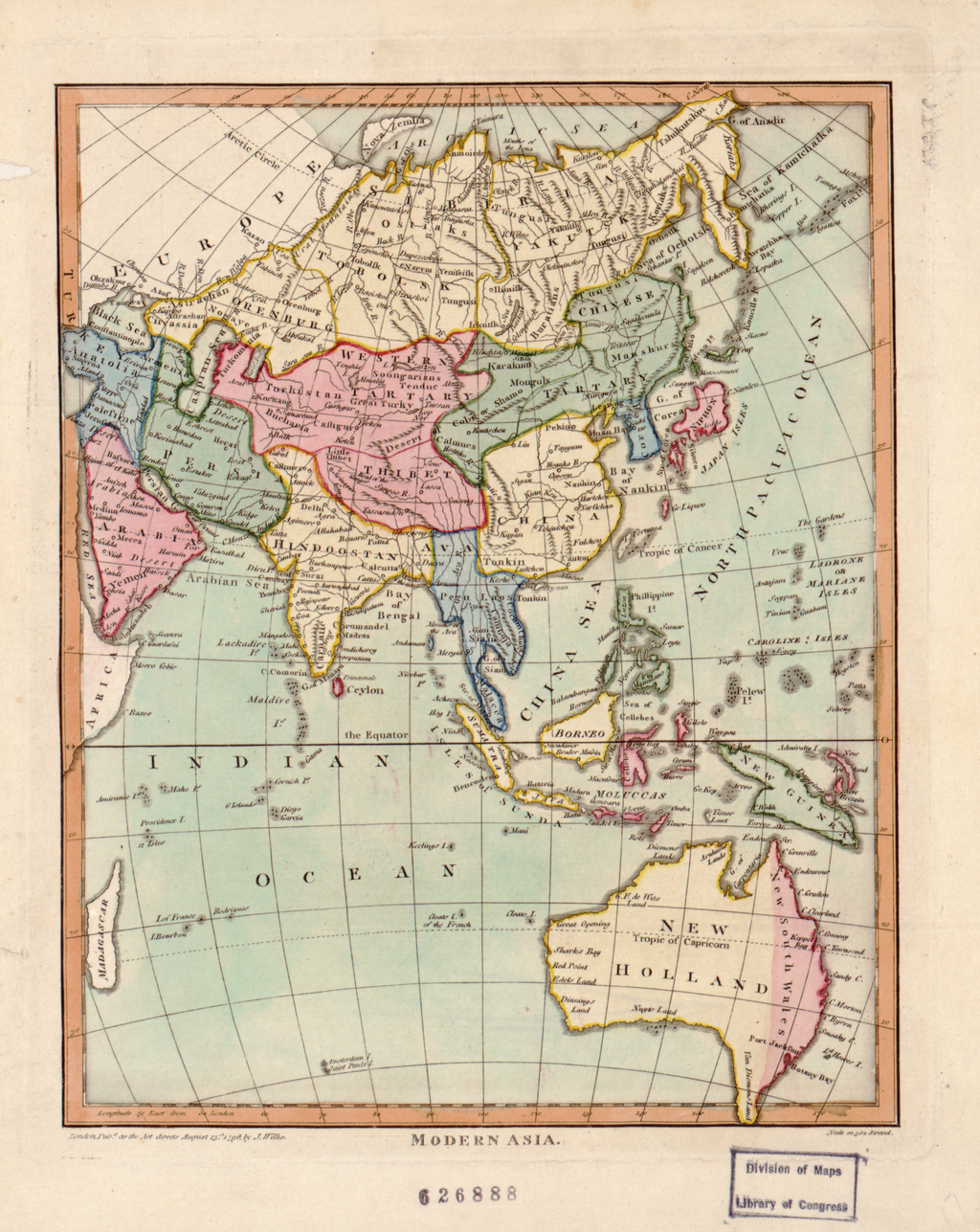
The map of Asia in 1796, which also included the continent of Australia (then known as New Holland)

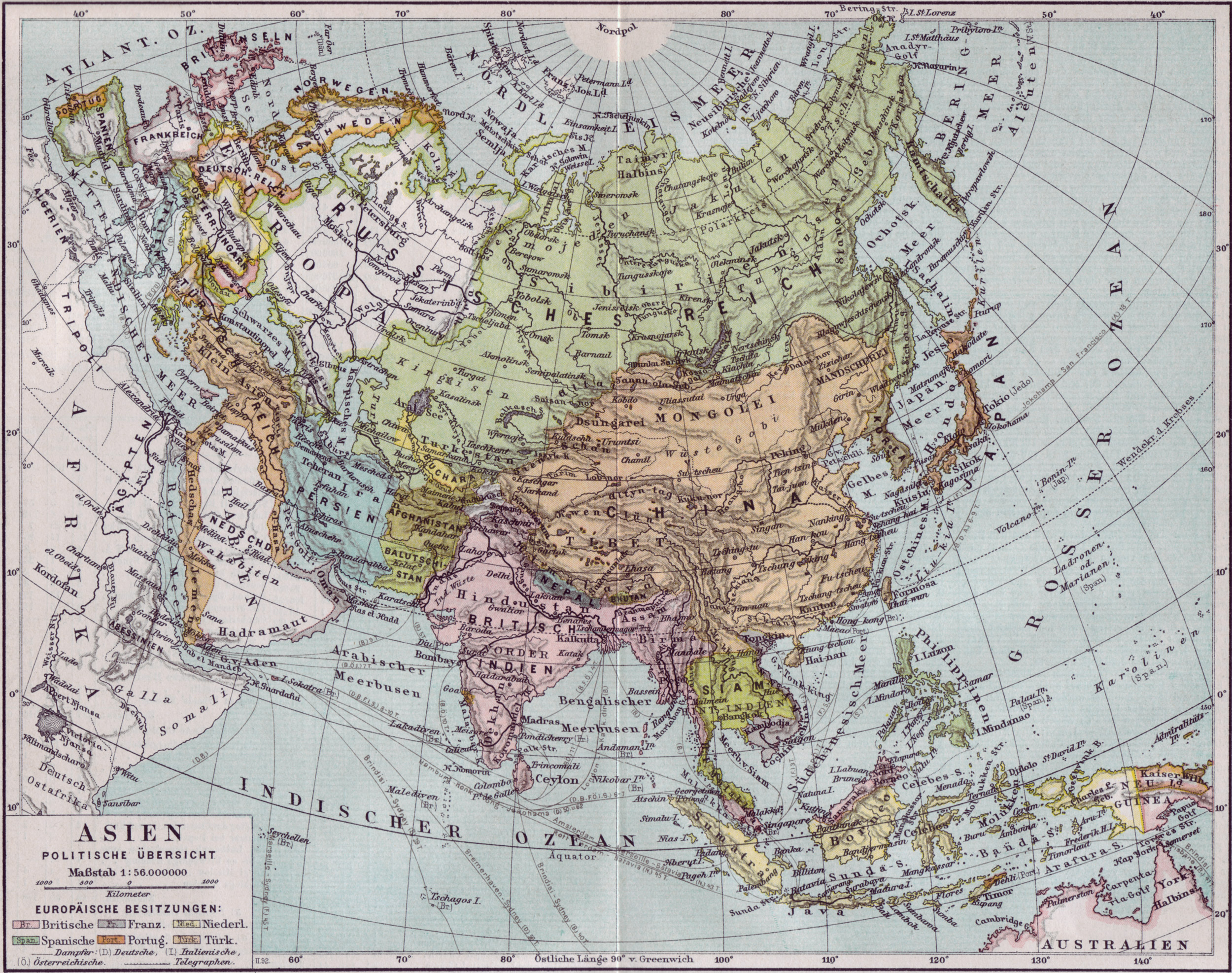
1890 map of Asia

== Geography ==
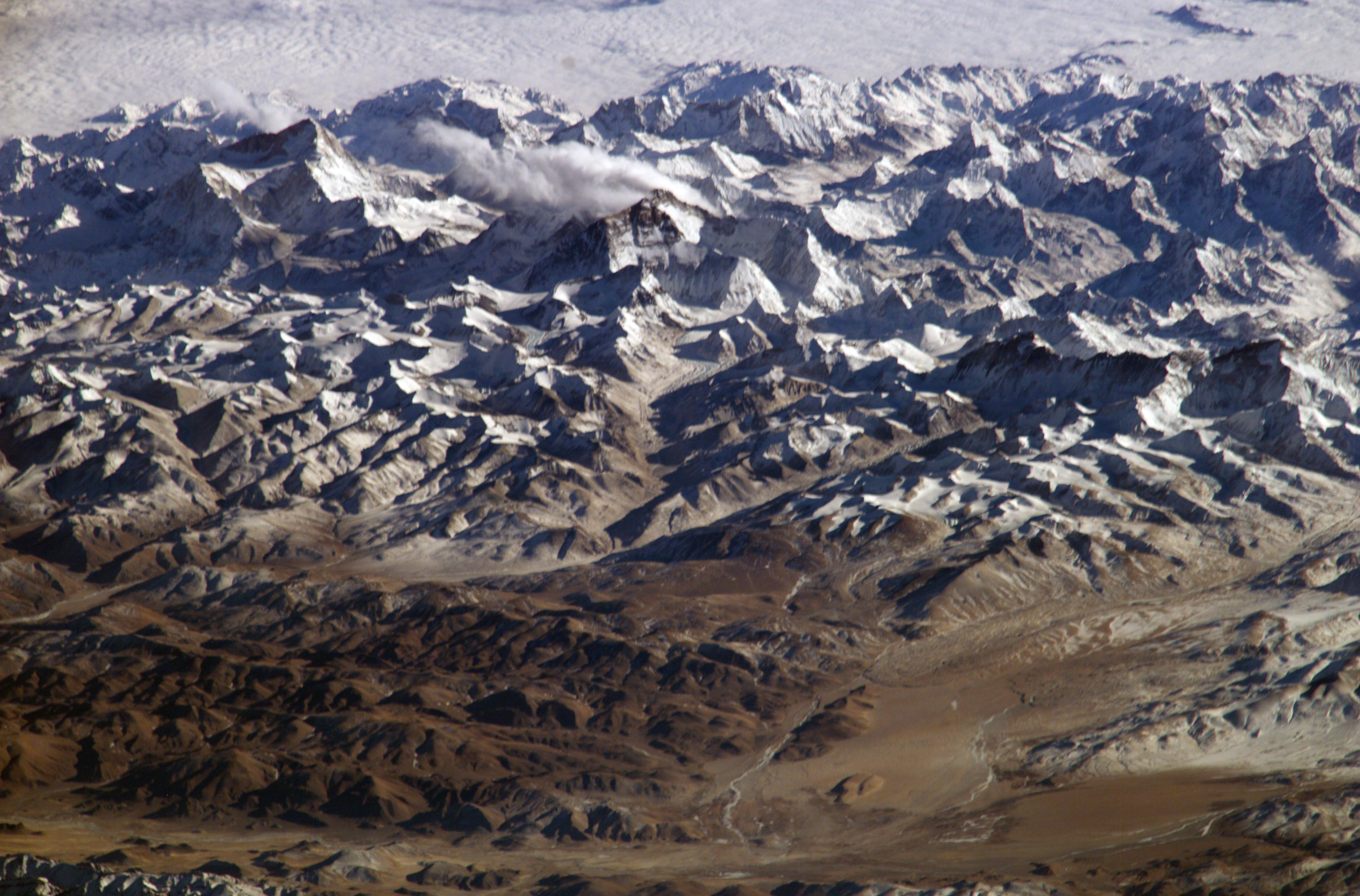
The Himalayan range is home to some of the planet's highest peaks.

Asia is the largest continent on Earth. It covers 9% of the Earth's total surface area (or 30% of its land area), and has the longest coastline, at 62,800 kilometres (39,022 mi). Asia is generally defined as comprising the eastern four-fifths of Eurasia. It is located to the east of the Suez Canal and the Ural Mountains, and south of the Caucasus Mountains (or the Kuma–Manych Depression) and the Caspian and Black Seas. It is bounded on the east by the Pacific Ocean, on the south by the Indian Ocean and on the north by the Arctic Ocean. Asia is subdivided into 49 countries, five of them (Georgia, Azerbaijan, Russia, Kazakhstan and Turkey) are transcontinental countries lying partly in Europe.

The Yangtze in China is the longest river in the continent. The Himalayas between Nepal and China is the tallest mountain range in the world. Tropical rainforests stretch across much of southern Asia and coniferous and deciduous forests lie farther north. Between 1990 and 2000 the area of primary forest in Asia decreased by 1.06 million hectares per year, between 2000 and 2015 it decreased by 280 000 ha per year.

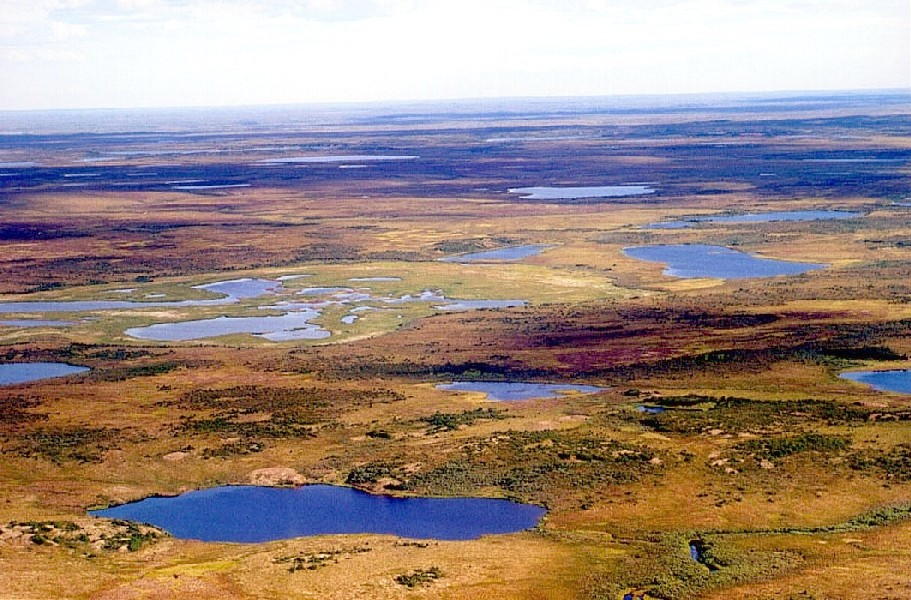
Siberian tundra

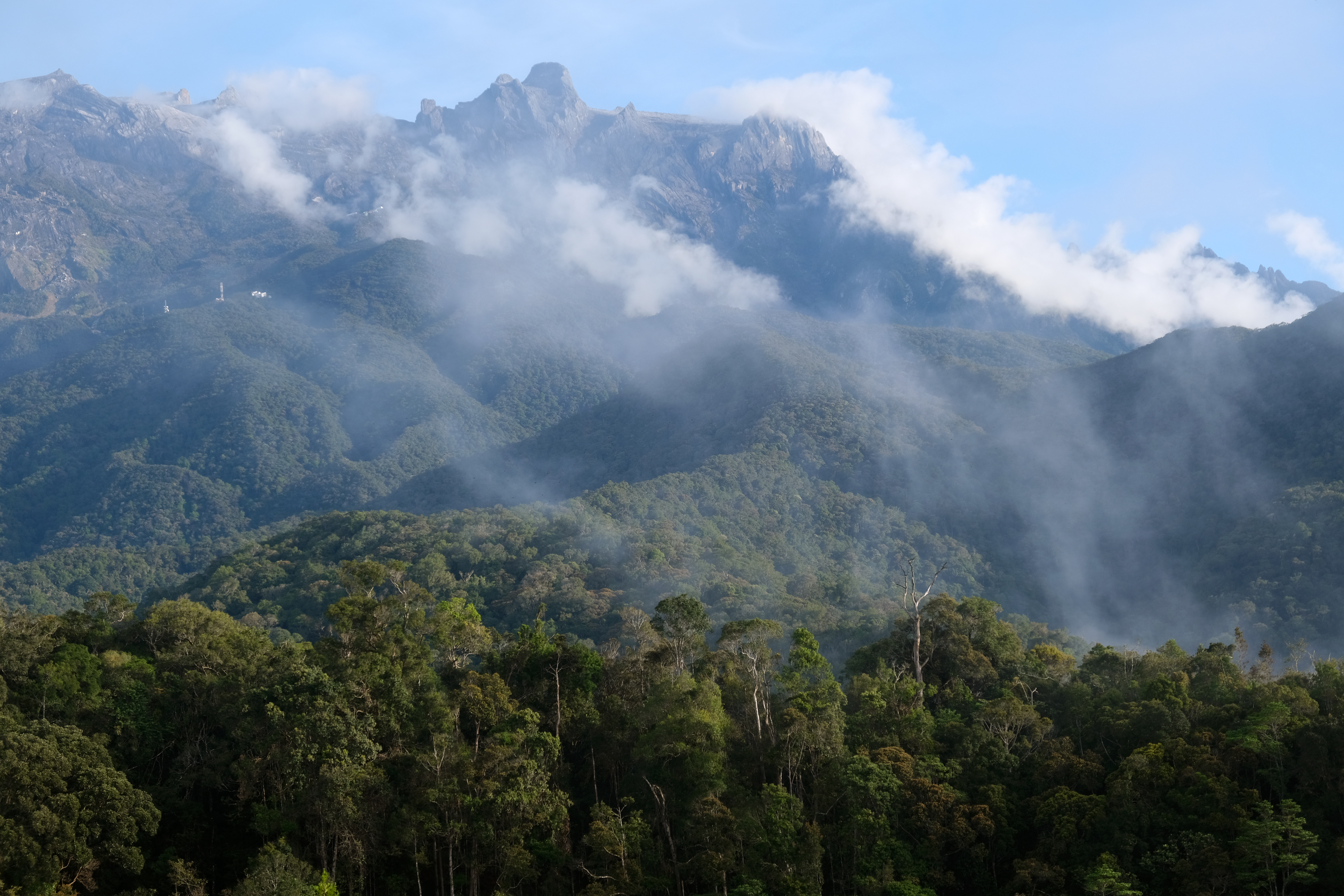
Rainforest in Borneo

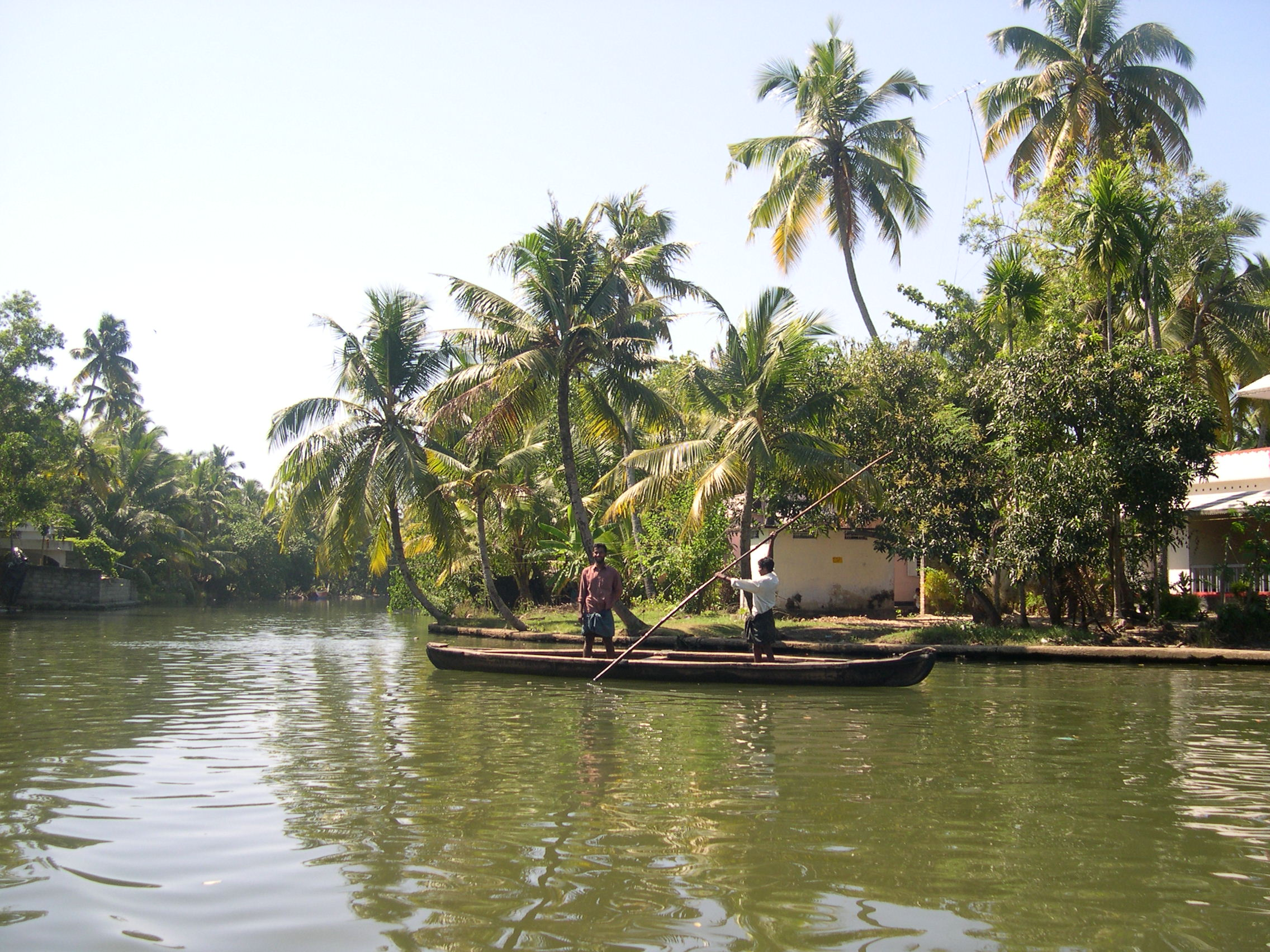
Kerala backwaters

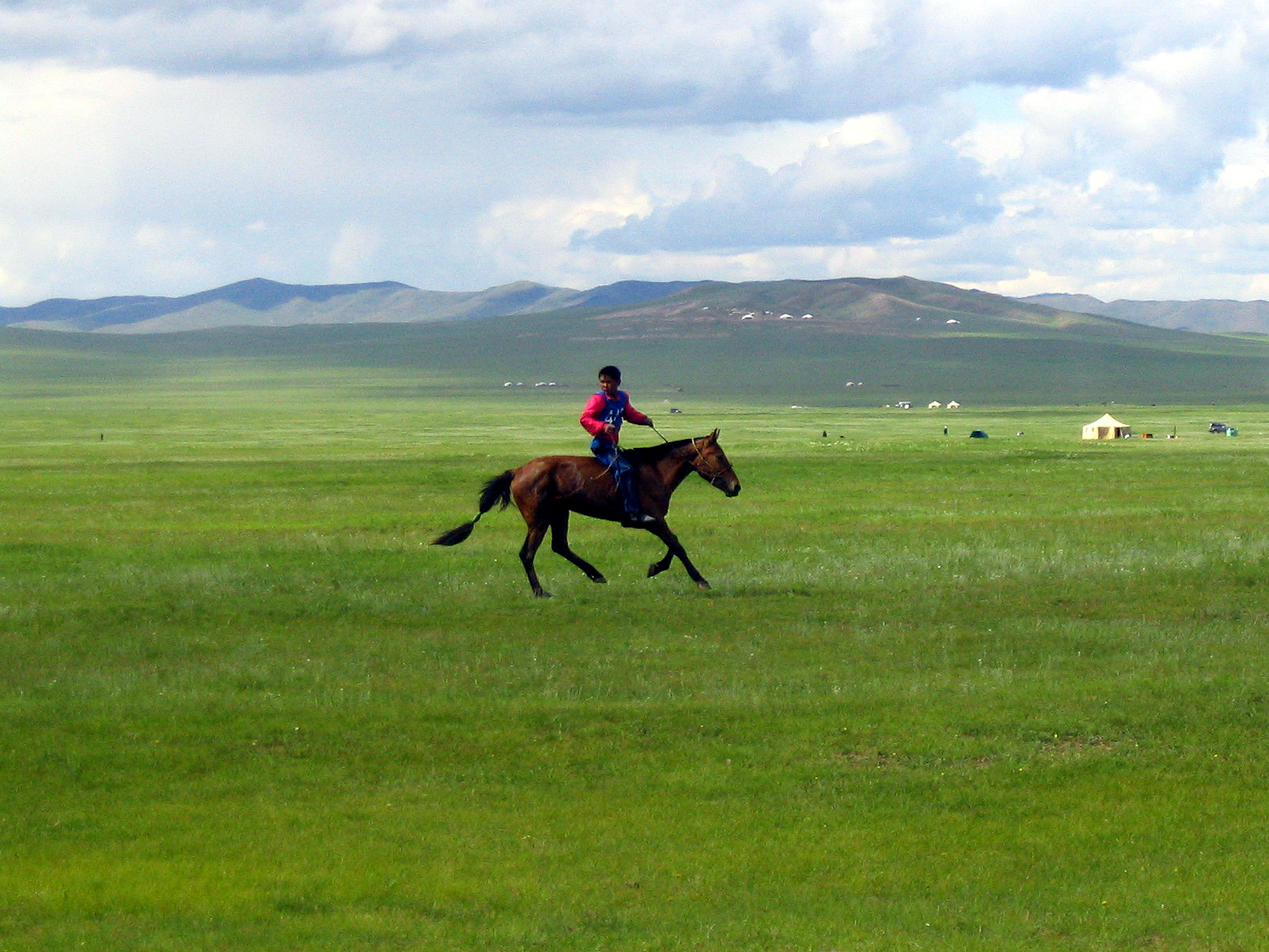
Mongolian steppe

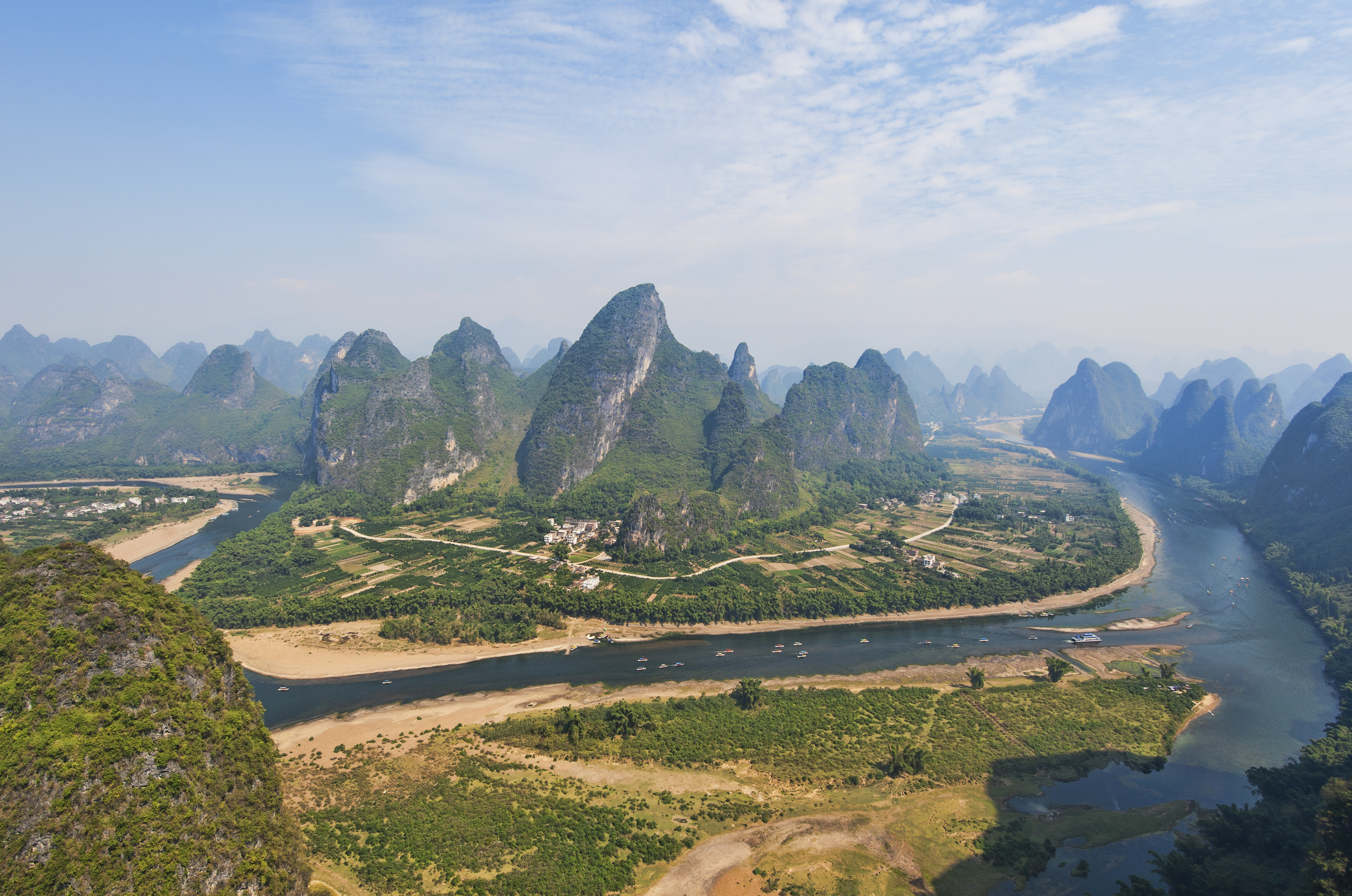
South China Karst

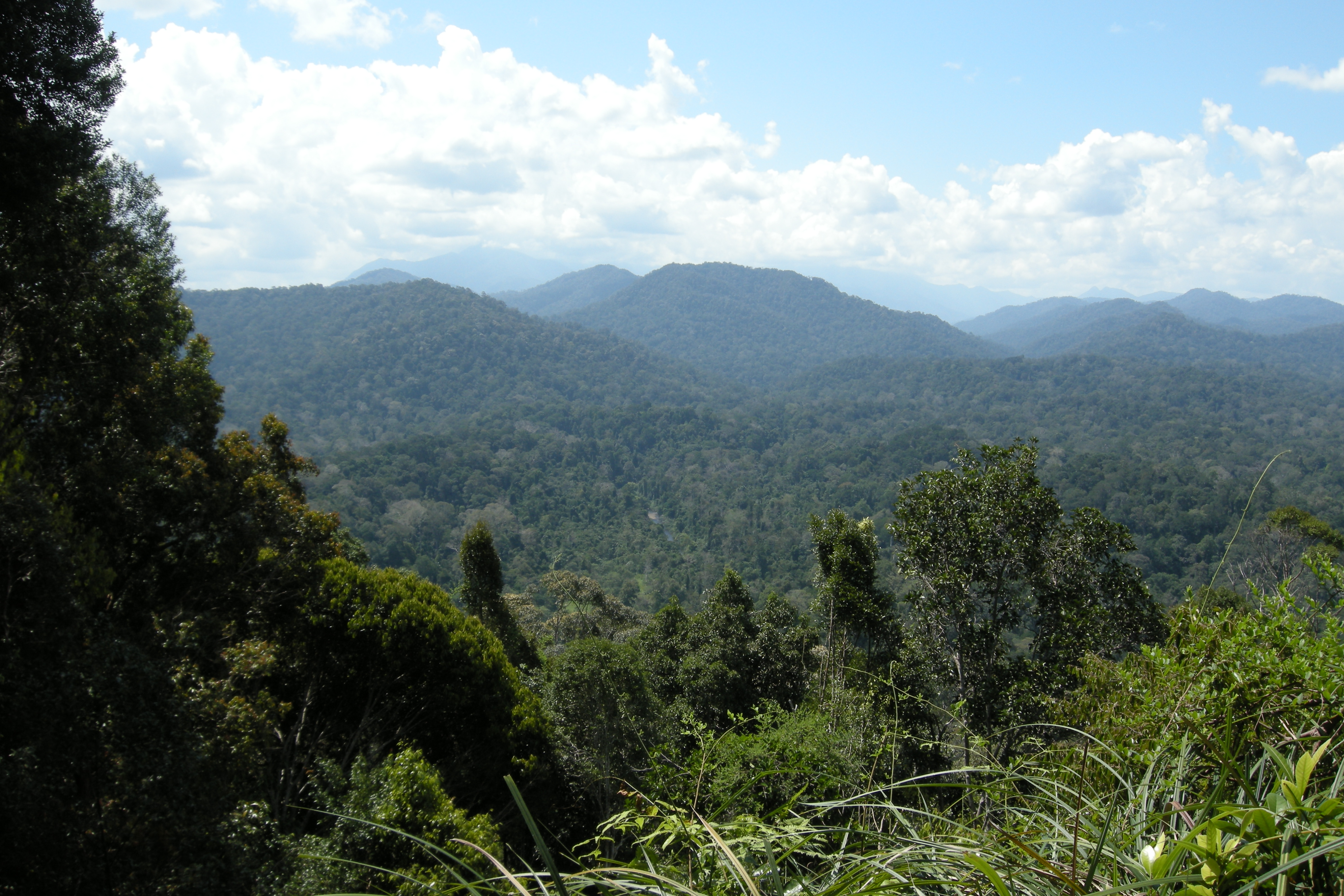
Taman Negara, Peninsular Malaysia

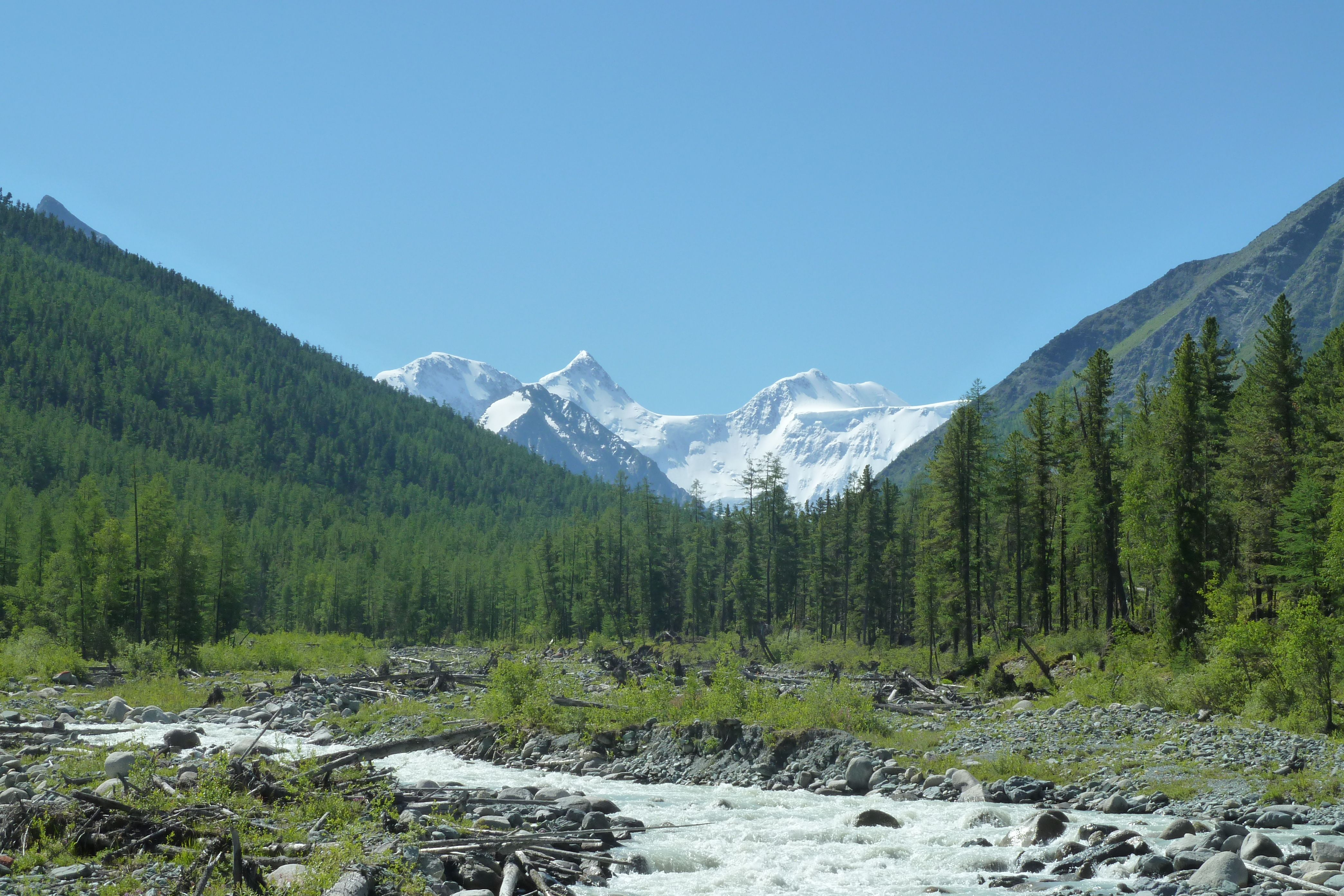
Altai Mountains

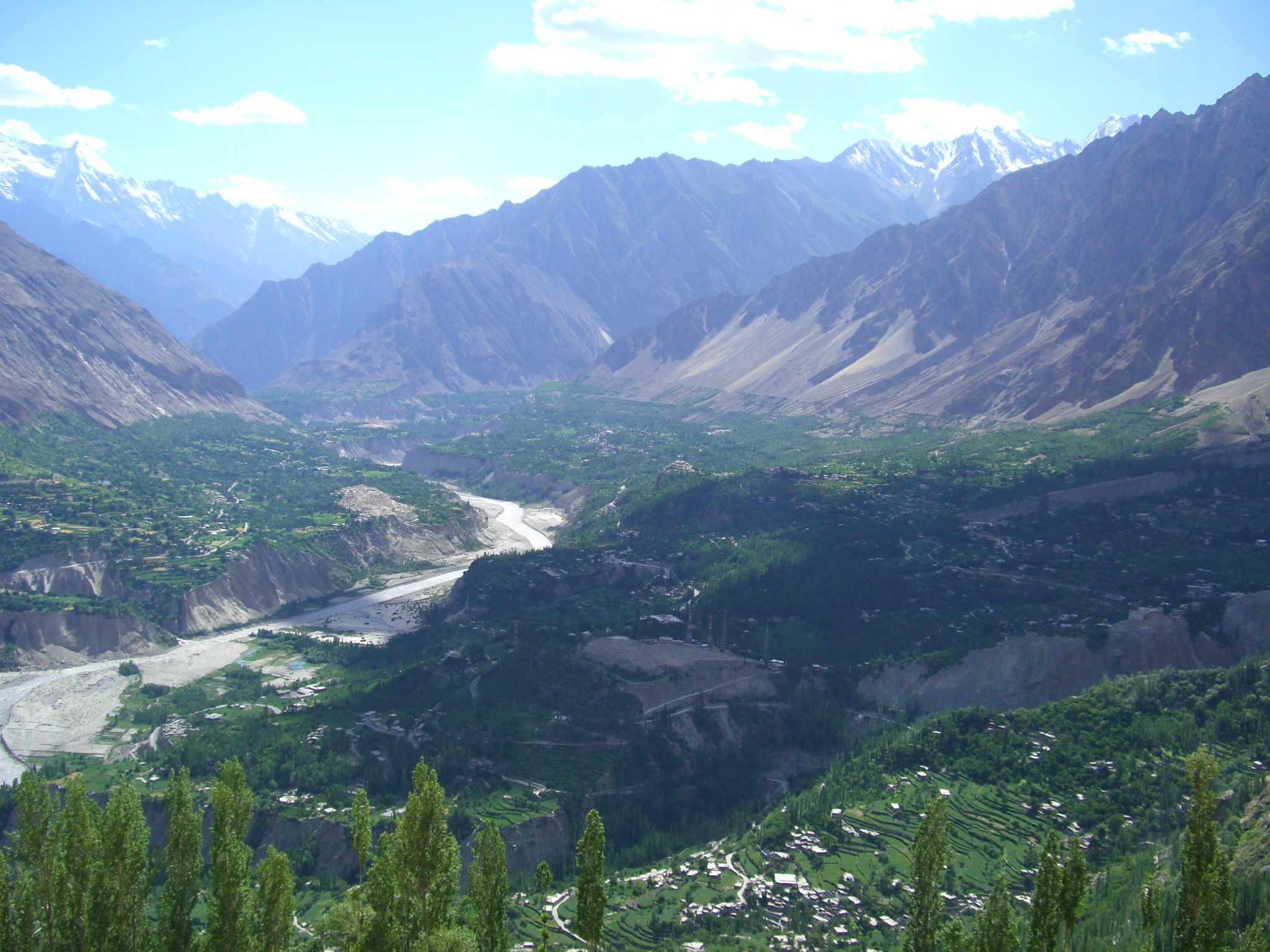
Hunza Valley

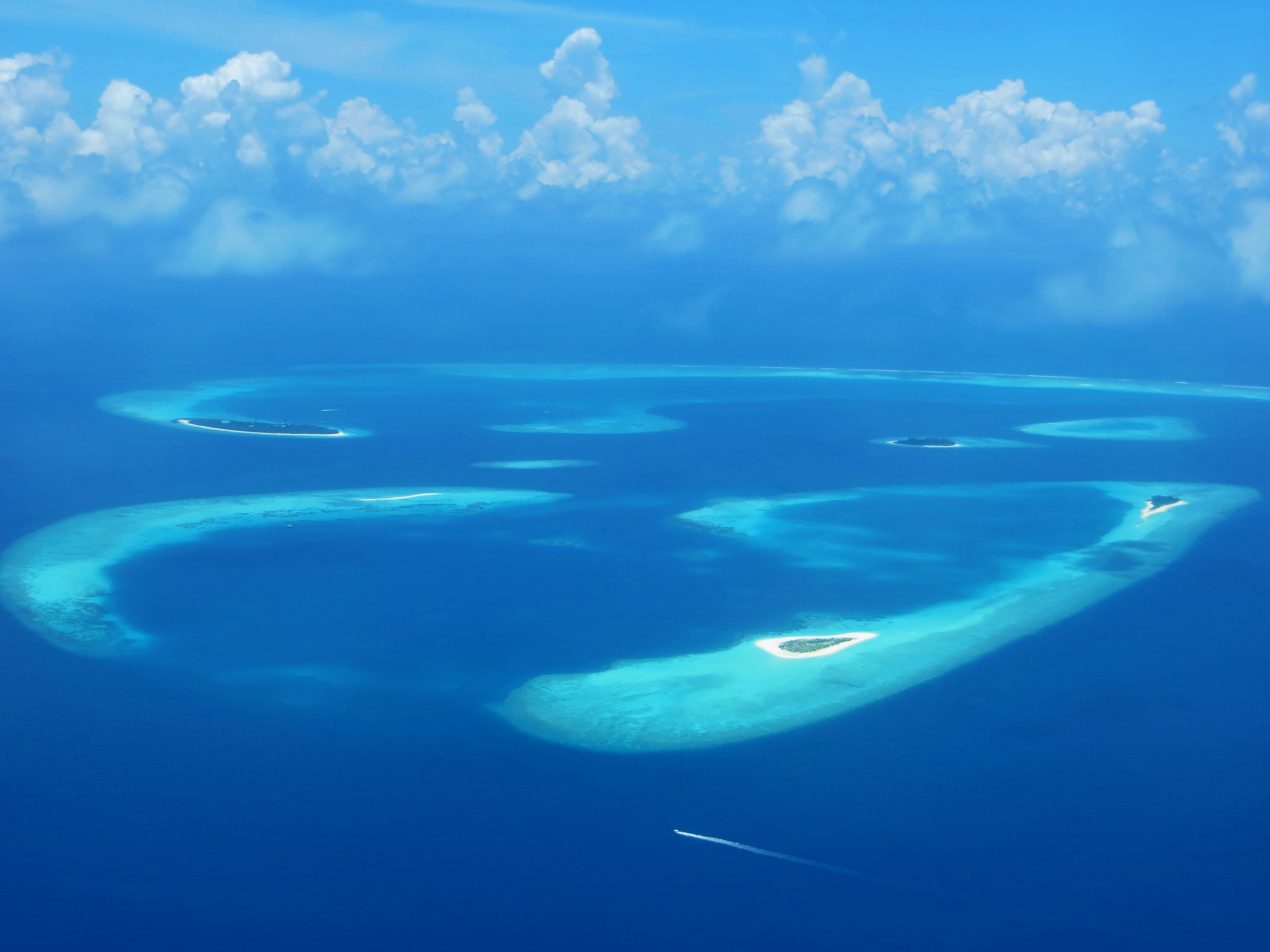
Atolls of the Maldives

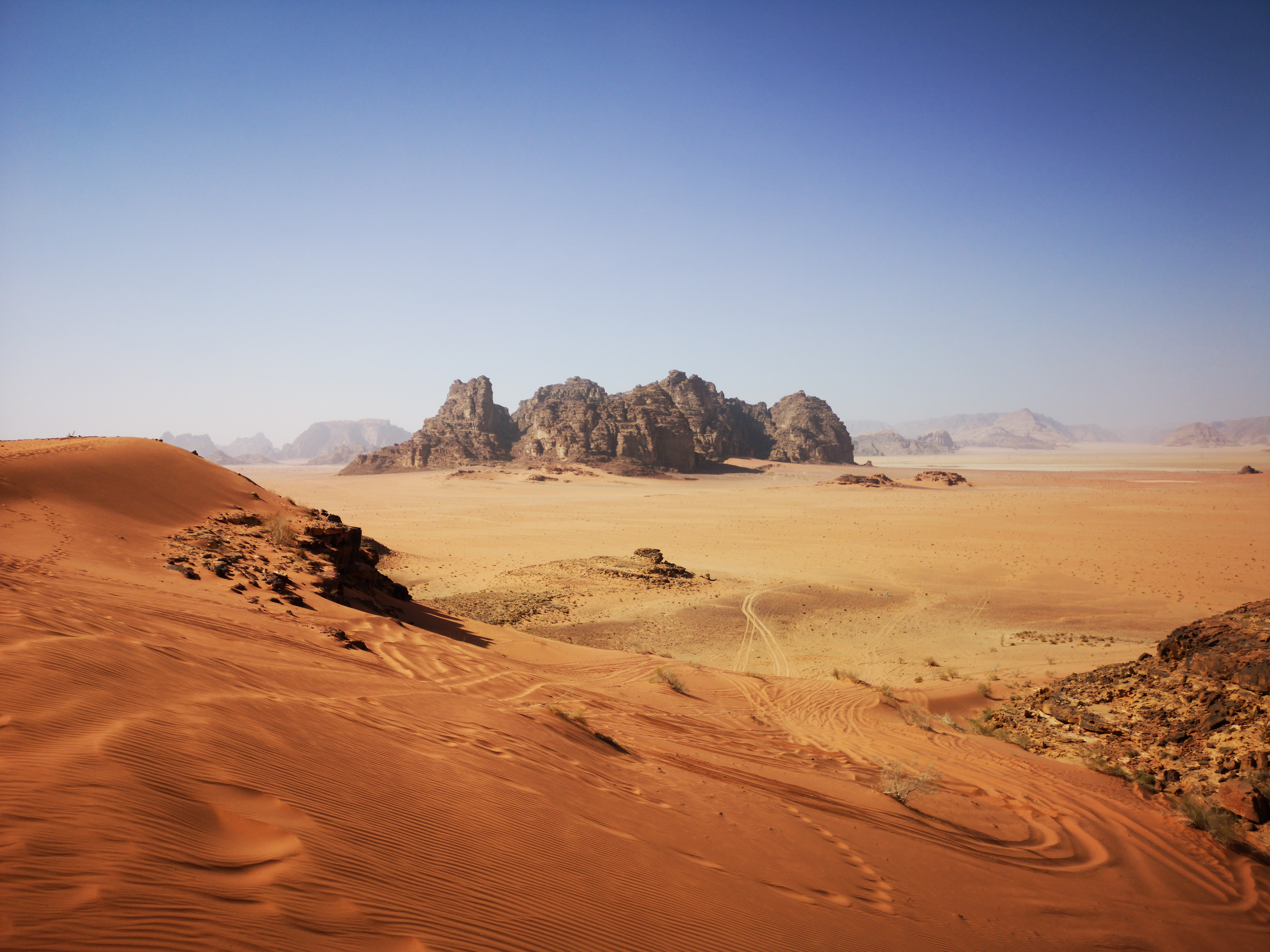
Wadi Rum in Jordan

=== Main regions ===
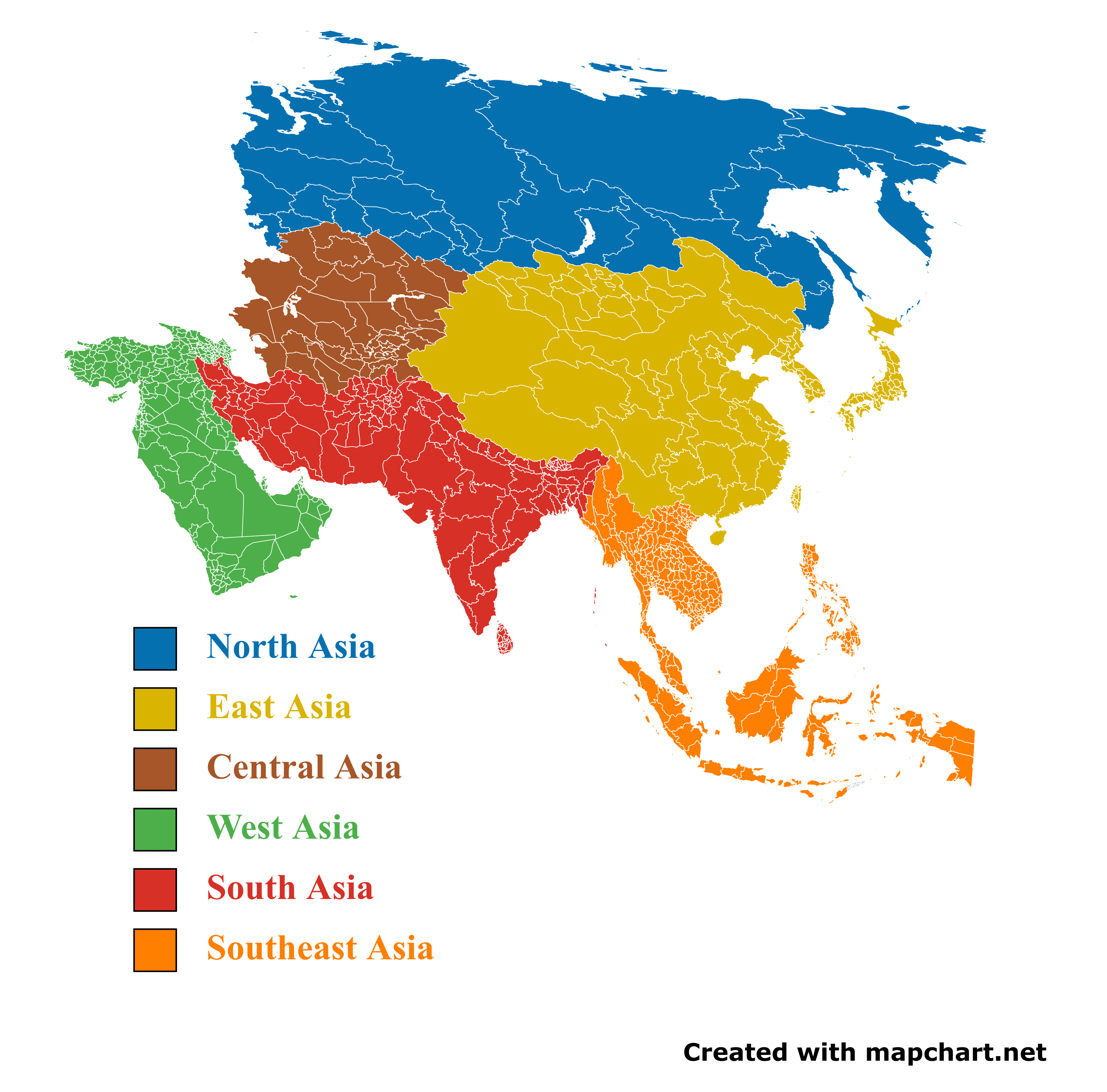
Detailed map of Asian regions

There are various approaches to the regional division of Asia. The following subdivision into regions is used, among others, by the United Nations Statistics Division (UNSD). This division of Asia into regions by the United Nations is done solely for statistical reasons and does not imply any assumption about political or other affiliations of countries and territories.

- North Asia (Siberia) (Note: Siberia lies in Asia geographically, but is considered part of Europe culturally and politically.)
- Central Asia
- West Asia (the Middle East or Near East and part of the Caucasus)
- South Asia (Indian subcontinent)
- East Asia (Far East)
- Southeast Asia (East Indies and Indochina)

=== Climate ===
Köppen-Geiger climate classification map for Asia

Asia has extremely diverse climate features. Climates range from Arctic and subarctic in Siberia to tropical in southern India and Southeast Asia. It is moist across southeast sections, and dry across much of the interior. Some of the largest daily temperature ranges on Earth occur in western sections of Asia. The monsoon circulation dominates across southern and eastern sections, due to the presence of the Himalayas forcing the formation of a thermal low which draws in moisture during the summer. Southwestern sections of the continent are hot. Siberia is one of the coldest places in the Northern Hemisphere, and can act as a source of arctic air masses for North America. The most active place on Earth for tropical cyclone activity lies northeast of the Philippines and south of Japan.

==== Climate change ====
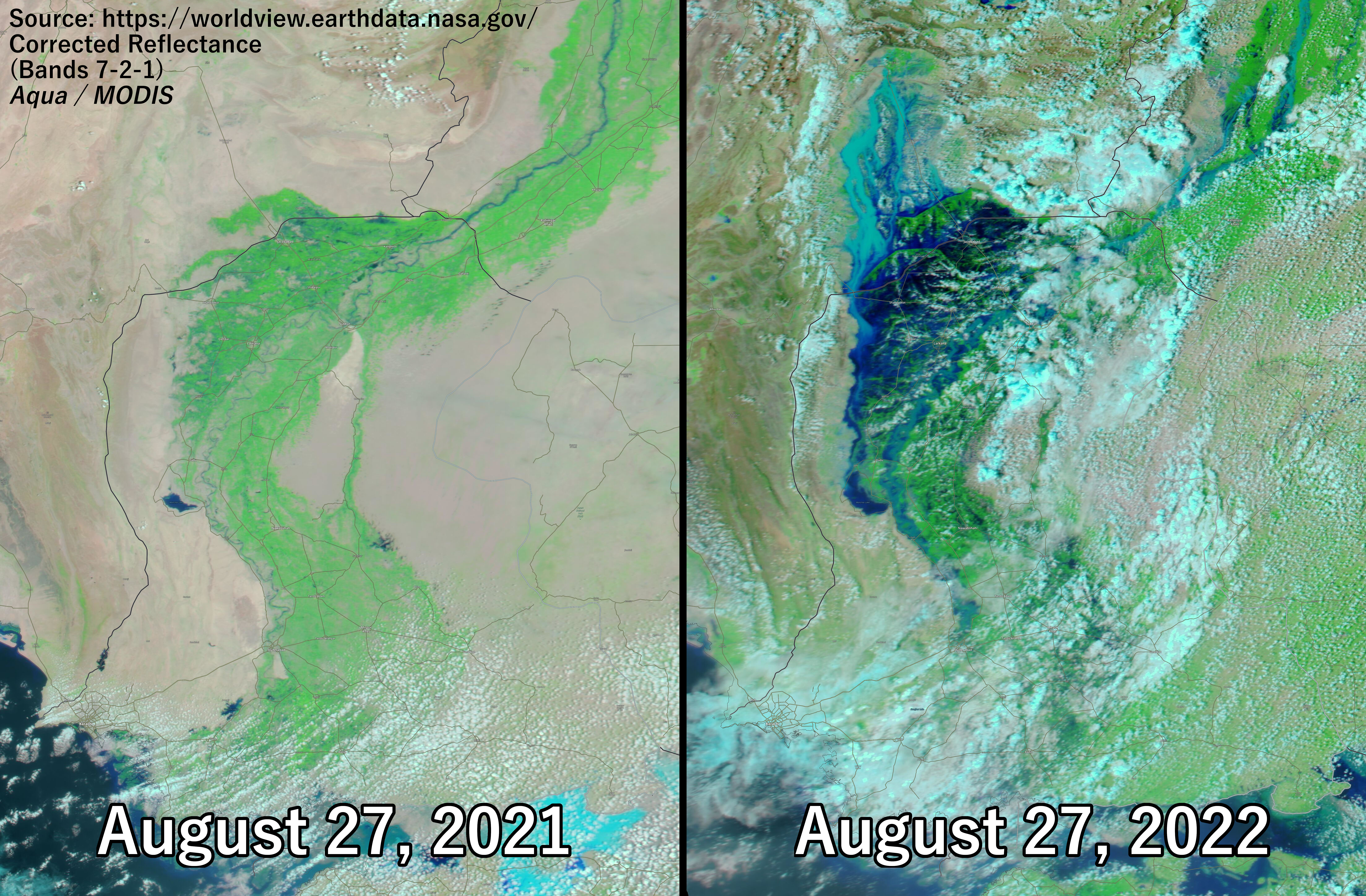
The 2022 South Asian floods, including in Pakistan (pictured), are an example of a climate change impact.

Climate change is particularly important in Asia, as the continent accounts for the majority of the human population. Warming since the 20th century is increasing the threat of heatwaves across the entire continent. Heatwaves lead to increased mortality, and the demand for air conditioning is rapidly accelerating as a result. By 2080, around 1 billion people in the cities of South and Southeast Asia are expected to experience around a month of extreme heat every year. The impacts on the water cycle are more complicated: already arid regions, primarily located in West Asia and Central Asia, will see more droughts, while areas of East, Southeast and South Asia which are already wet due to the monsoons will experience more flooding.

The waters around Asia are subjected to the same impacts as elsewhere, such as increased warming and ocean acidification. There are many coral reefs in the region, and they are highly vulnerable to climate change, to the point that practically all of them will be lost if the warming exceeds 1.5 °C (2.7 °F). Asia's distinctive mangrove ecosystems are also highly vulnerable to sea level rise. Asia also has more countries with large coastal populations than any other continent, which would cause large economic impacts from sea level rise. Water supplies in the Hindu Kush region will become more unstable as its enormous glaciers, known as the "Asian water towers", gradually melt. These changes to the water cycle also affect vector-borne disease distribution, with malaria and dengue fever expected to become more prominent in the tropical and subtropical regions. Food security will become more uneven, and South Asian countries could experience significant impacts from global food price volatility.

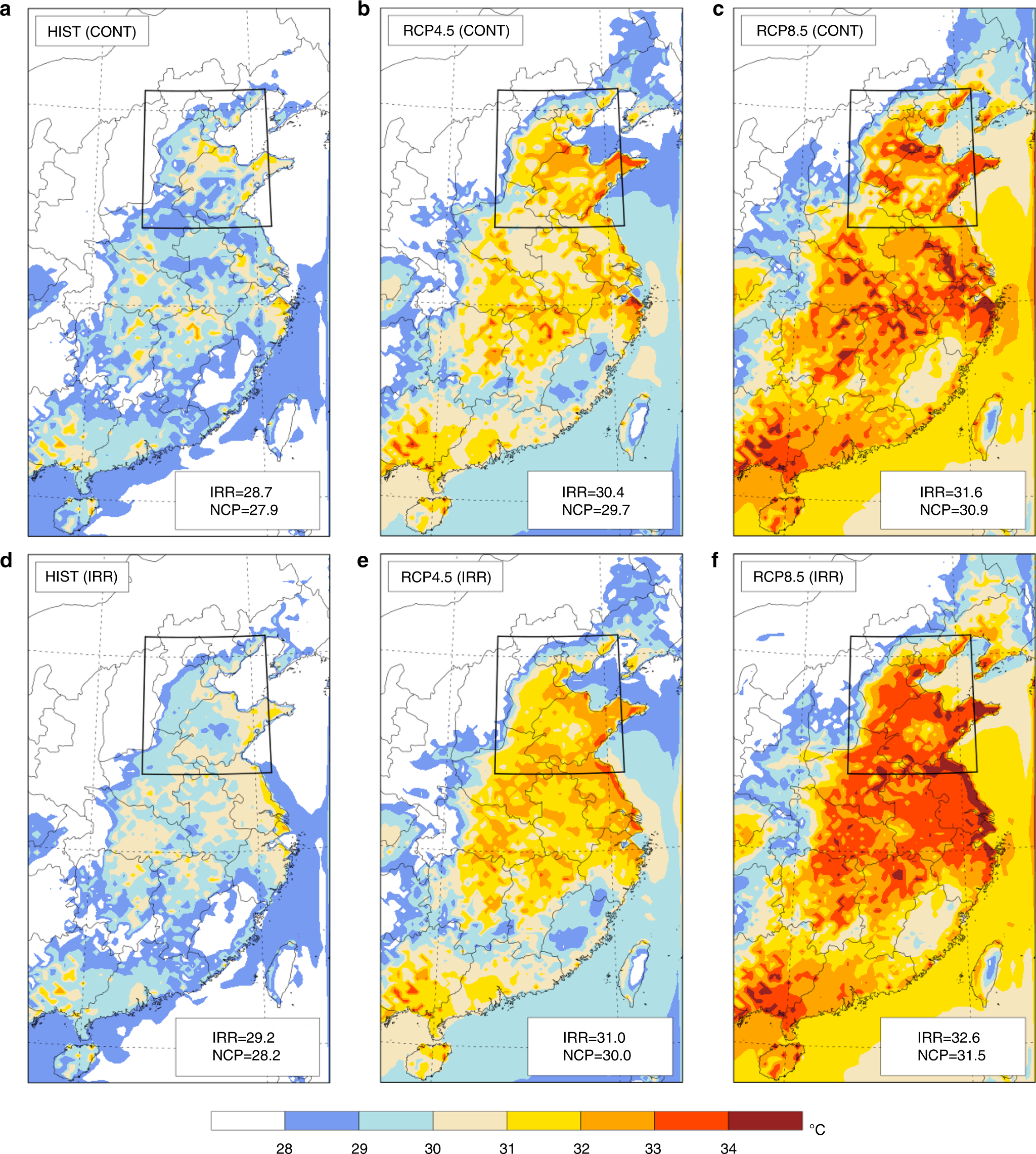
Climate change is expected to exacerbate heat stress over the North China Plain, which is particularly vulnerable as widespread irrigation results in very moist air. There is a risk that agricultural labourers will be physically unable to work outdoors on hot summer days at the end of the century, particularly under the scenario of greatest emissions and warming.

Historical emissions from Asia are lower than those from Europe and North America. However, China has been the single largest emitter of greenhouse gases in the 21st century, while India is the third-largest. As a whole, Asia currently accounts for 36% of the world's primary energy consumption, which is expected to increase to 48% by 2050. By 2040, it is also expected to account for 80% of the world's coal and 26% of the world's natural gas consumption. While the United States remains the world's largest oil consumer, by 2050 it is projected to move to third place, behind China and India. While nearly half of the world's new renewable energy capacity is built in Asia, this is not yet sufficient in order to meet the goals of the Paris Agreement. They imply that the renewables would account for 35% of total energy consumption in Asia by 2030.

Climate change adaptation is already a reality for many Asian countries, with a wide range of strategies attempted across the continent. Important examples include the growing implementation of climate-smart agriculture in certain countries or the "sponge city" planning principles in China. While some countries have drawn up extensive frameworks such as the Bangladesh Delta Plan or Japan's Climate Adaptation Act, others still rely on localized actions that are not effectively scaled up.

== Politics ==
Map of 2026 V-Dem Electoral Democracy Index for Asia, higher values more democratic 0.90–1.00 0.80–0.89 0.70–0.79 0.60–0.69 0.50–0.59 0.40–0.49 0.30–0.39 0.20–0.29 0.10–0.19 0.00–0.09 No data

The most democratic countries in Asia are Japan, Taiwan and South Korea according to the V-Dem Democracy indices.

== List of states and territories ==
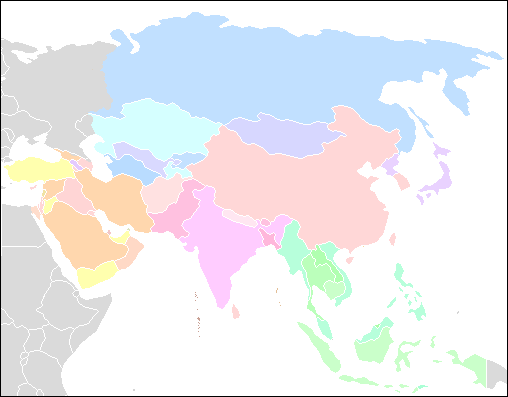

| Emblem | Flag | Name | Population (2021) | Area (km^{2}) | Capital |
|---|---|---|---|---|---|
| Emblem | (Afghanistan) | Afghanistan | 40,099,462 | 652,864 | Kabul |
| Emblem | (Armenia) | Armenia | 2,790,974 | 29,743 | Yerevan |
| Emblem | (Azerbaijan) | Azerbaijan (Note: Azerbaijan is a transcontinental country, straddling the border between Europe and Asia. Its culture is influenced by both European and Asian customs.) | 10,312,992 | 86,600 | Baku |
| Emblem | (Bahrain) | Bahrain | 1,463,265 | 760 | Manama |
| Emblem | (Bangladesh) | Bangladesh | 169,356,251 | 147,570 | Dhaka |
| Emblem | (Bhutan) | Bhutan | 777,486 | 38,394 | Thimphu |
| Emblem | (Brunei) | Brunei | 445,373 | 5,765 | Bandar Seri Begawan |
| Arms | (Cambodia) | Cambodia | 16,589,023 | 181,035 | Phnom Penh |
| Emblem | (China) | China (PRC) | 1,425,893,465 | 9,596,961 | Beijing |
| Emblem | (Cyprus) | Cyprus | 1,244,188 | 9,251 | Nicosia |
| Emblem | (Egypt) | Egypt (Note: Egypt is a transcontinental country located primarily in Africa, with the Sinai Peninsula being located in Asia.) | 109,262,178 | 1,001,449 | Cairo (Note: Cairo is located in Africa.) |
| Emblem | (Georgia (country)) | Georgia (Note: Georgia is a transcontinental country, with a small northern portion lying in Europe. Despite being primarily located in Asia, Georgia leans strongly towards European culture and has closer ties with the UN and NATO.) | 3,757,980 | 69,700 | Tbilisi |
| Emblem | (India) | India | 1,407,563,842 | 3,287,263 | New Delhi |
| Emblem | (Indonesia) | Indonesia (Note: Indonesia is a transcontinental country, with the island of New Guinea being located in Melanesia - a region of Oceania. New Guinea's eastern portion is shared with Papua New Guinea.) | 273,753,191 | 1,904,569 | Jakarta |
| Emblem | (Iran) | Iran | 87,923,432 | 1,648,195 | Tehran |
| Emblem | (Iraq) | Iraq | 43,533,592 | 438,317 | Baghdad |
| Emblem | (Israel) | Israel | 8,900,059 | 20,770 | Jerusalem (limited recognition) |
| Seal | (Japan) | Japan | 124,612,530 | 377,915 | Tokyo |
| Seal | (Jordan) | Jordan | 11,148,278 | 89,342 | Amman |
| Emblem | (Kazakhstan) | Kazakhstan (Note: Kazakhstan is a transcontinental country, with about 15% of its land located in Europe.) | 19,196,465 | 2,724,900 | Astana |
| Emblem | (Kuwait) | Kuwait | 4,250,114 | 17,818 | Kuwait City |
| Emblem | (Kyrgyzstan) | Kyrgyzstan | 6,527,743 | 199,951 | Bishkek |
| Emblem | (Laos) | Laos | 7,425,057 | 236,800 | Vientiane |
| | (Lebanon) | Lebanon | 5,592,631 | 10,400 | Beirut |
| Emblem | (Malaysia) | Malaysia | 33,573,874 | 329,847 | Kuala Lumpur |
| Emblem | (Maldives) | Maldives | 521,457 | 298 | Malé |
| Emblem | (Mongolia) | Mongolia | 3,347,782 | 1,564,116 | Ulaanbaatar |
| Seal | (Myanmar) | Myanmar | 53,798,084 | 676,578 | Naypyidaw |
| Emblem | (Nepal) | Nepal | 30,034,989 | 147,181 | Kathmandu |
| Emblem | (North Korea) | North Korea | 25,971,909 | 120,538 | Pyongyang |
| Emblem | (Oman) | Oman | 4,520,471 | 309,500 | Muscat |
| Emblem | (Pakistan) | Pakistan | 211,103,000 | 881,913 | Islamabad |
| Emblem | (Philippines) | Philippines | 113,880,328 | 343,448 | Manila |
| Emblem | (Qatar) | Qatar | 2,688,235 | 11,586 | Doha |
| Emblem | (Russia) | Russia (Note: Russia is a transcontinental country located in Eastern Europe and North Asia, but is considered European historically, culturally, ethnically, and politically, and the vast majority of its population (78%) lives within its European part.) | 145,102,755 | 17,098,242 | Moscow (Note: Moscow is located in Europe.) |
| Emblem | (Saudi Arabia) | Saudi Arabia | 35,950,396 | 2,149,690 | Riyadh |
| Arms | (Singapore) | Singapore | 5,941,060 | 697 | Singapore |
| Emblem | (South Korea) | South Korea | 51,830,139 | 100,210 | Seoul |
| Emblem | (Sri Lanka) | Sri Lanka | 21,773,441 | 65,610 | Sri Jayawardenepura Kotte |
| Emblem | (Syria) | Syria | 21,324,367 | 185,180 | Damascus |
| Emblem | (Tajikistan) | Tajikistan | 9,750,064 | 143,100 | Dushanbe |
| Emblem | (Thailand) | Thailand | 71,601,103 | 513,120 | Bangkok |
| Emblem | (Timor-Leste) | Timor-Leste | 1,320,942 | 14,874 | Dili |
| | (Turkey) | Turkey (Note: Turkey is a transcontinental country located mainly in West Asia with a smaller portion in Southeastern Europe.) | 84,775,404 | 783,562 | Ankara |
| Emblem | (Turkmenistan) | Turkmenistan | 6,341,855 | 488,100 | Ashgabat |
| Emblem | (United Arab Emirates) | United Arab Emirates | 9,365,145 | 83,600 | Abu Dhabi |
| Emblem | (Uzbekistan) | Uzbekistan | 34,081,449 | 447,400 | Tashkent |
| Emblem | (Vietnam) | Vietnam | 97,468,029 | 331,212 | Hanoi |
| Emblem | (Yemen) | Yemen (Note: Yemen is a transcontinental country. While its mainland is geographically part of Asia, the Socotra Archipelago islands are geographically located in Africa.) | 32,981,641 | 527,968 | Sanaa (const.; SPC control); Aden (prv. capital of PLC) |

Within the states mentioned above are several partially recognized countries with limited to no international recognition. None of them are members of the UN, however Palestine has observer state status:

| Symbol | Flag | Name | Population | Area (km^{2}) | Capital |
|---|---|---|---|---|---|
| Arms | (Abkhazia) | Abkhazia | 242,862 | 8,660 | Sokhumi |
| Arms | (Northern Cyprus) | Northern Cyprus | 326,000 | 3,355 | North Nicosia |
| Arms | (Palestine) | Palestine | 5,133,392 | 6,025 | Jerusalem (limited recognition) |
| Coat of arms of South Ossetia#Republic of South Ossetia–the State of Alania | (South Ossetia) | South Ossetia | 51,547 | 3,900 | Tskhinvali |
| Emblem | (Taiwan) | Taiwan (ROC) | 23,859,912 | 36,193 | Taipei |

== Economy ==
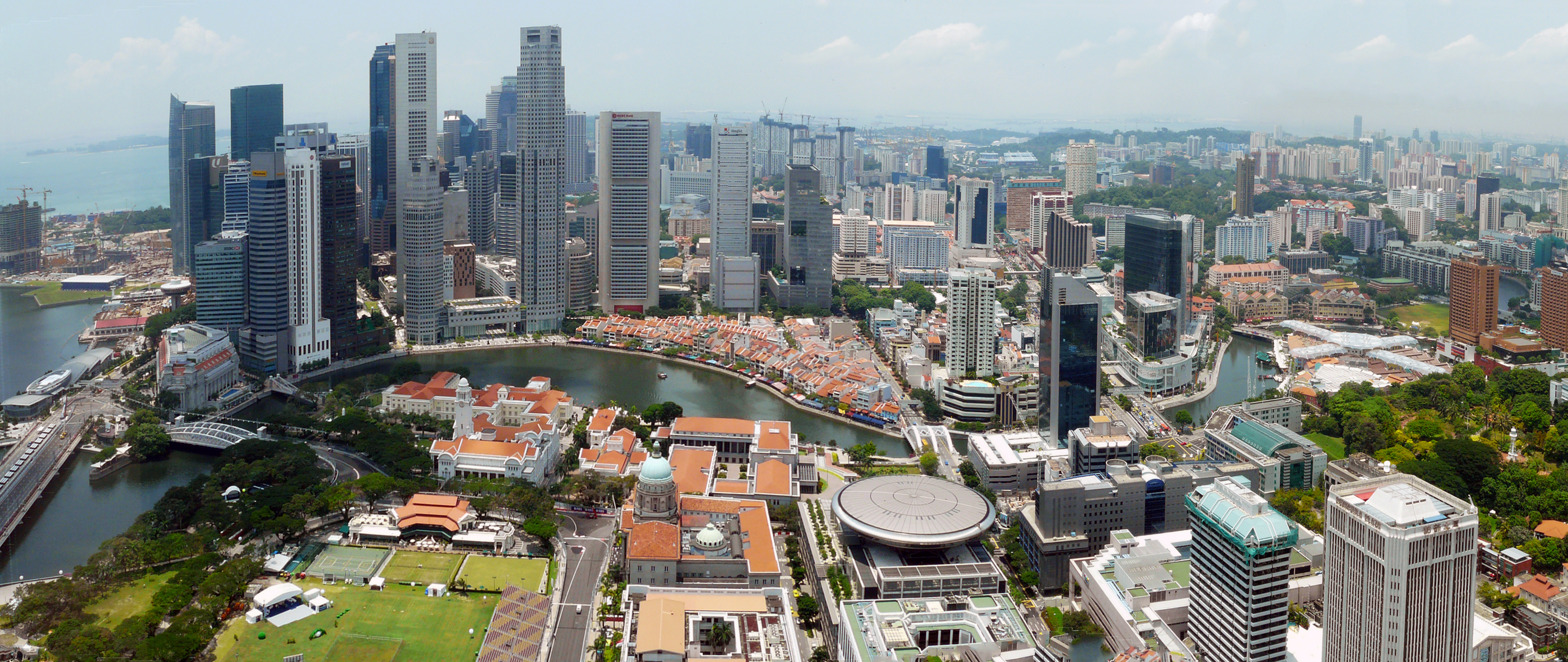
Singapore has one of the busiest container ports in the world and is the world's fourth-largest foreign exchange trading hub.

Asia is both the largest continental economy in the world by both GDP nominal and PPP values and the world's fastest growing economic region. As of 2026, China is by far the largest economy on the continent. It is followed by India, Japan, South Korea, Turkey, Indonesia, Saudi Arabia, and Taiwan, which are all ranked among the top 20 largest economies by both nominal GDP and PPP values. Based on Global Office Locations 2011, Asia dominated global office locations with 4 of the top 5 being in Asia: Hong Kong, Singapore, Tokyo and Seoul. Around 68% of international firms have an office in Hong Kong.

In the late 1990s and early 2000s, the economy of China had an average annual growth rate of more than 8%. According to economic historian Angus Maddison, India had the world's largest economy for much of the past three millennia prior to the 19th century, accounting for 25% of the world's industrial output. China was the largest and most advanced economy on Earth for much of recorded history and shared the mantle with India. For several decades in the late twentieth century, Japan was the largest economy in Asia and second-largest in the world, after surpassing the Soviet Union (measured in net material product) in 1990 and Germany in 1968. This ended in 2010, when China overtook Japan to become the world's second largest economy. In 2025, India overtook Japan in terms of nominal GDP to become the world's 4th largest and Asia's 2nd largest economy.

In the late 1980s and early 1990s, Japan's GDP by currency exchange rates was almost as large as that of the rest of Asia combined. In 1995, Japan's economy nearly equaled that of the US as the largest economy in the world for a day, after the Japanese currency reached a record high of 79 yen/US$. Economic growth in Asia since World War II to the 1990s had been concentrated in Japan as well as South Korea, Taiwan, Hong Kong, and Singapore, known as the Four Asian Tigers, which are now all considered developed economies, having among the highest GDP per capita in Asia.

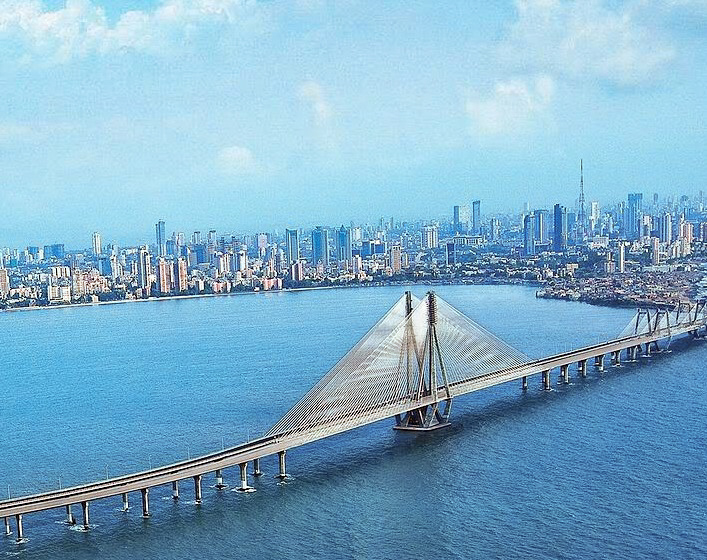
Mumbai is one of the most populous cities in Asia, as well as an economic and tourism hub.

Asia is the largest continent in the world by a considerable margin, and it is rich in natural resources, such as petroleum, forests, fish, water, rice, copper and silver. Manufacturing in Asia has traditionally been strongest in East and Southeast Asia, particularly in China, Taiwan, South Korea, Japan, India, the Philippines, and Singapore. Japan and South Korea continue to dominate in the area of multinational corporations, though increasingly China and India are making significant inroads. Many companies from Europe, North America, South Korea, and Japan have operations in Asia's developing countries to take advantage of its abundant supply of cheap labour and relatively developed infrastructure.

According to Citigroup in 2011, 9 of 11 Global Growth Generator countries came from Asia driven by population and income growth. They are Bangladesh, China, India, Indonesia, Iraq, Mongolia, the Philippines, Sri Lanka, and Vietnam. Asia has three main financial centers: Hong Kong, Tokyo, and Singapore. Call centers and business process outsourcing firms (BPOs) are becoming major employers in India and the Philippines due to the availability of a large pool of highly skilled, English-speaking workers. The increased use of outsourcing has assisted the rise of India and the China as financial centers. Due to its large and extremely competitive information technology industry, India has become a major hub for outsourcing.

Trade between Asian countries and countries on other continents is largely carried out via sea routes. The main route leads from the Chinese coast south via Hanoi to Jakarta, Singapore, and Kuala Lumpur, through the Strait of Malacca via Colombo to the southern tip of India, then via Malé to Mombasa in East Africa (see also Indo-Pacific), from there to Djibouti, then through the Red Sea and the Suez Canal into the Mediterranean (see also: Indo-Mediterranean), then via Haifa, Istanbul, and Athens to the northern Italian hub of Trieste, with its rail connections to Central and Eastern Europe, or further to Barcelona and around Spain and France to northern European ports. A far smaller part of the goods traffic runs via South Africa to Europe. A particularly significant part of Asian goods traffic is carried out on the Pacific Rim, toward Los Angeles and Long Beach. The melting of the Arctic is also paving the way for new shipping routes from Northeast Asia to Europe and North America. The land route to Europe is also the subject of construction projects, comparatively smaller in scope. Intra-Asian trade, including sea trade, is growing rapidly.

In 2010, Asia had 3.3 million millionaires (people with net worth over US$1 million excluding their homes), slightly below North America's 3.4 million. In 2011, Asia topped Europe in the number of millionaires. Citigroup in The Wealth Report 2012 stated that the total wealth of people in Asia with over $100 million in assets exceeded that of their North American counterparts for the first time, as the world's "economic center of gravity" continued moving east. At the end of 2011, there were 18,000 people in Asia, mainly in Southeast Asia, China, and Japan, with at least $100 million in disposable assets, compared to North America with 17,000 and Western Europe with 14,000.

| Rank | Country | GDP (nominal, Peak Year) millions of USD |
|---|---|---|
| 1 | China | 21,546,403 |
| 2 | Japan (2012) | 6,333,804 |
| 3 | India | 4,060,207 |
| 4 | Russia | 2,861,156 |
| 5 | South Korea | 2,245,847 |
| 6 | Turkey | 1,817,987 |
| 7 | Indonesia | 1,479,954 |
| 8 | Saudi Arabia | 1,343,346 |
| 9 | Taiwan | 1,019,596 |

| Rank | Country | GDP (PPP, Peak Year) millions of USD |
|---|---|---|
| 1 | China | 44,554,951 |
| 2 | India | 19,192,617 |
| 3 | Russia | 7,542,897 |
| 4 | Japan | 7,324,055 |
| 5 | Indonesia | 5,483,042 |
| 6 | Turkey | 4,025,804 |
| 7 | South Korea | 3,625,973 |
| 8 | Saudi Arabia (2025) | 2,730,087 |
| 9 | Egypt | 2,600,028 |

=== Energy ===
Asia's electricity demand has quadrupled since 2000 (rising from 4,199 TWh to over 16,000 TWh in 2024). This growth, driven largely by China and increasingly by India, Indonesia, and Viet Nam, makes Asia the fastest-growing region for electricity demand globally, at about 5% per year. The region now accounts for about 36% of global primary energy consumption, a share projected to approach 50% by 2050.^{: 1468} Fossil fuels remain central in Asia: 66% of its energy is generated from fossil fuels, and Asia makes up 83% of the world's coal generation. However, coal is slowly being phased out and natural gas is displacing oil and oil products in various sectors, supported by policies and regulations. Natural gas demand in emerging market and developing economies in Asia expanded by around 6% in 2024, accounting for nearly 40% of incremental global gas demand. By 2040, Asia is expected to account for the majority of global coal use and over a quarter of natural gas consumption.^{: 1468}

At the same time, Asia is the global leader in renewable energy expansion. It is currently the only region on track to meet the goal of tripling renewable capacity by 2030, largely due to China, the leading nation in renewable energy generation. China's wind and solar capacity has surged in recent years, together overtaking that of coal, while in 2024 India become the world's third largest generator of electricity from wind and solar. Nearly half of the world's new renewable energy capacity is built in Asia.^{: 1470}

=== Tourism ===
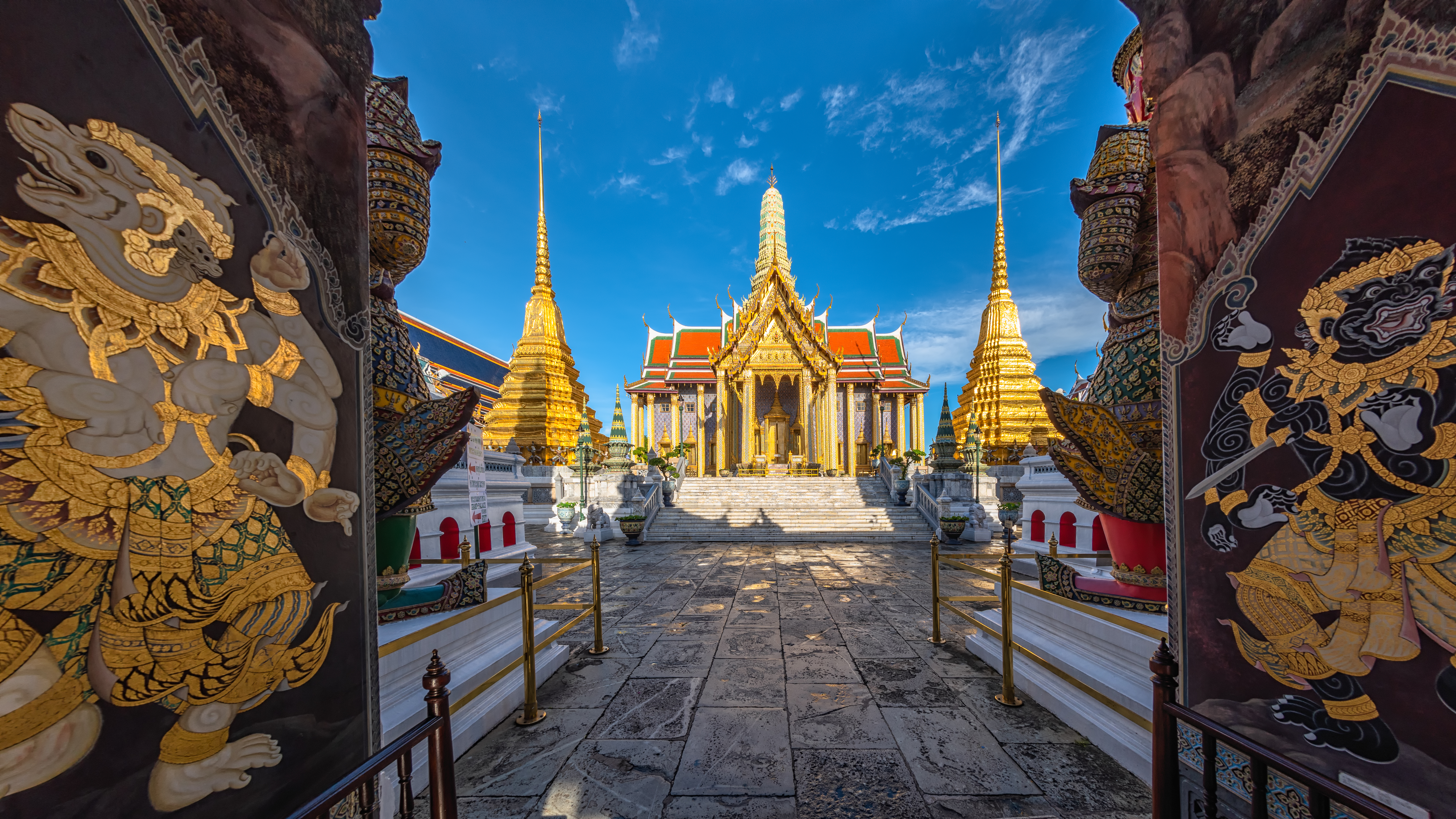
Wat Phra Kaew in the Grand Palace is among Bangkok's major tourist attractions.

In 2013, with regional tourism growing and dominated by Chinese visitors, MasterCard released the Global Destination Cities Index report, in which 10 of 20 cities are Asian and Pacific cities. This was also the first time an Asian city (Bangkok) was in the number one spot, with 15.98 million international visitors.

== Demographics ==
Historical populations
| Year | Pop. | ±% p.a. |
|---|---|---|
| 1500 | 243,000,000 | — |
| 1700 | 436,000,000 | +0.29% |
| 1900 | 947,000,000 | +0.39% |
| 1950 | 1,402,000,000 | +0.79% |
| 1999 | 3,634,000,000 | +1.96% |
| 2016 | 4,462,676,731 | +1.22% |
Source: "UN report 2004 data" (PDF). The figure for 2021 is provided by the 2022 revision of the World Population Prospects

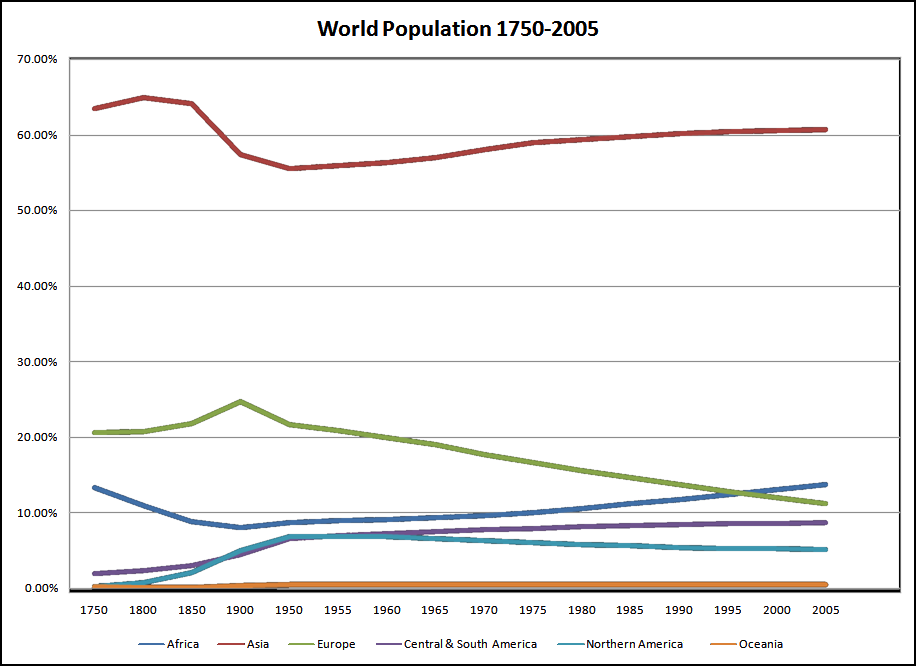
World population

East Asia had by far the strongest overall Human Development Index (HDI) improvement of any region in the world, nearly doubling average HDI attainment over the past 40 years, according to the report's analysis of health, education and income data. China, the second highest achiever in the world in terms of HDI improvement since 1970, is the only country on the "Top 10 Movers" list due to income rather than health or education achievements. Its per capita income increased a stunning 21-fold over the last four decades, also lifting hundreds of millions out of income poverty. Yet it was not among the region's top performers in improving school enrollment and life expectancy.
Nepal, a South Asian country, emerges as one of the world's fastest movers since 1970 mainly due to health and education achievements. Its present life expectancy is 25 years longer than in the 1970s. More than four of every five children of school age in Nepal now attend primary school, compared to just one in five 40 years ago.
Hong Kong ranked highest among the countries grouped on the HDI (number 7 in the world, which is in the "very high human development" category), followed by Singapore (9), Japan (19) and South Korea (22). Afghanistan (155) ranked lowest amongst Asian countries out of the 169 countries assessed.

=== Languages ===
Asia is home to several language families and many language isolates. Most Asian countries have more than one language that is natively spoken. For instance, according to Ethnologue, more than 700 languages are spoken in Indonesia, more than 400 languages spoken in India, and more than 100 are spoken in the Philippines. China has many languages and dialects in different provinces.

=== Religions ===
Many of the world's major religions have their origins in Asia, including the five most practiced in the world (excluding irreligion), which are Christianity, Islam, Hinduism, Chinese folk religion (classified as Confucianism and Taoism), and Buddhism. Asian mythology is complex and diverse. The story of the Great Flood for example, as presented to Jews in the Hebrew Bible (Tanakh) in the narrative of Noah—later translated from Hebrew to Greek and included in Christanity’s Old Testament, and to Muslims in the Quran—is earliest found in Mesopotamian mythology, in the Enûma Eliš and Epic of Gilgamesh. Hindu mythology similarly tells about an avatar of Vishnu in the form of a fish who warned Manu of a terrible flood. Ancient Chinese mythology also tells of a Great Flood spanning generations, one that required the combined efforts of emperors and divinities to control.

==== Abrahamic ====
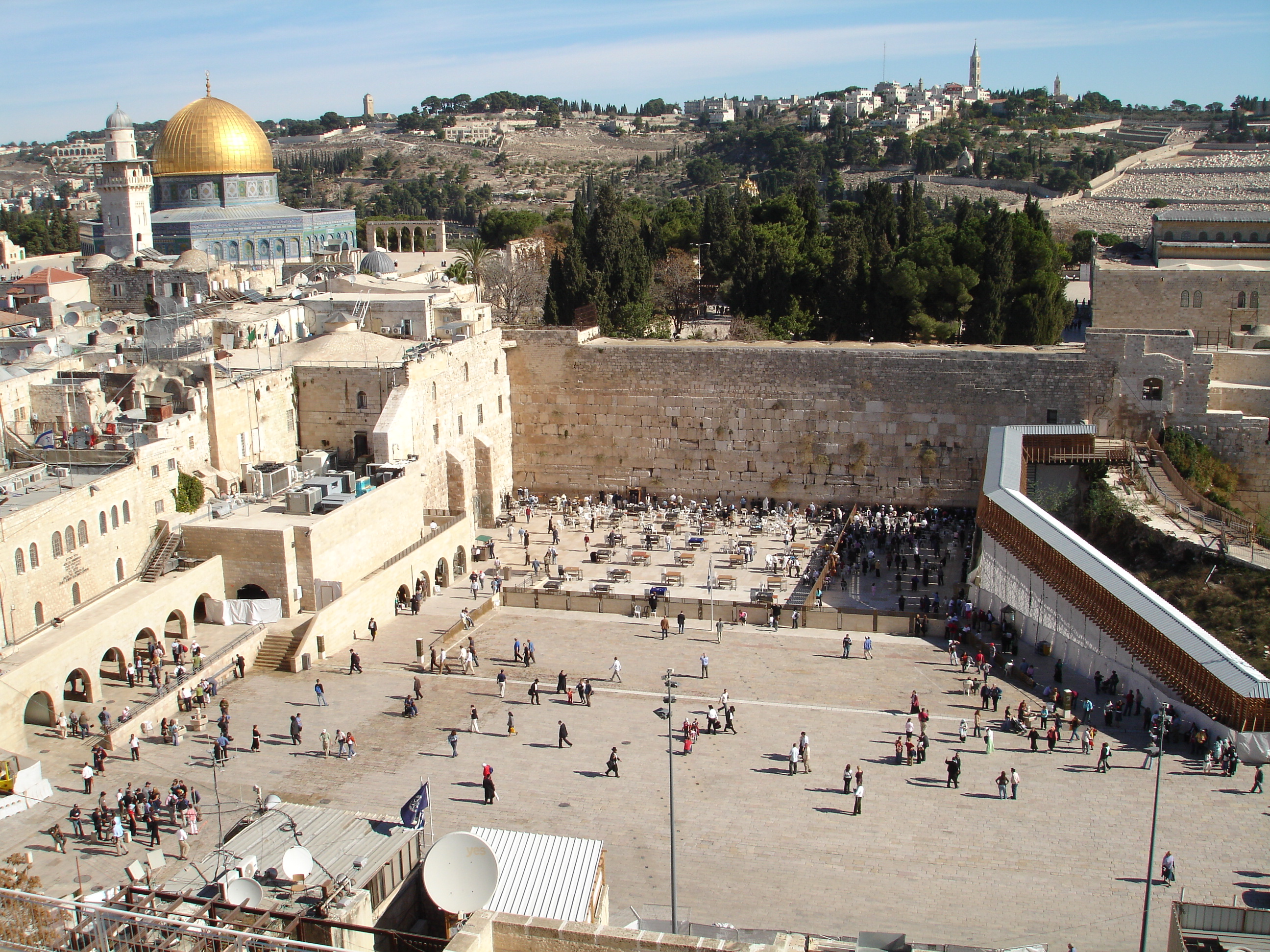
The Western Wall and the Dome of the Rock, Jerusalem

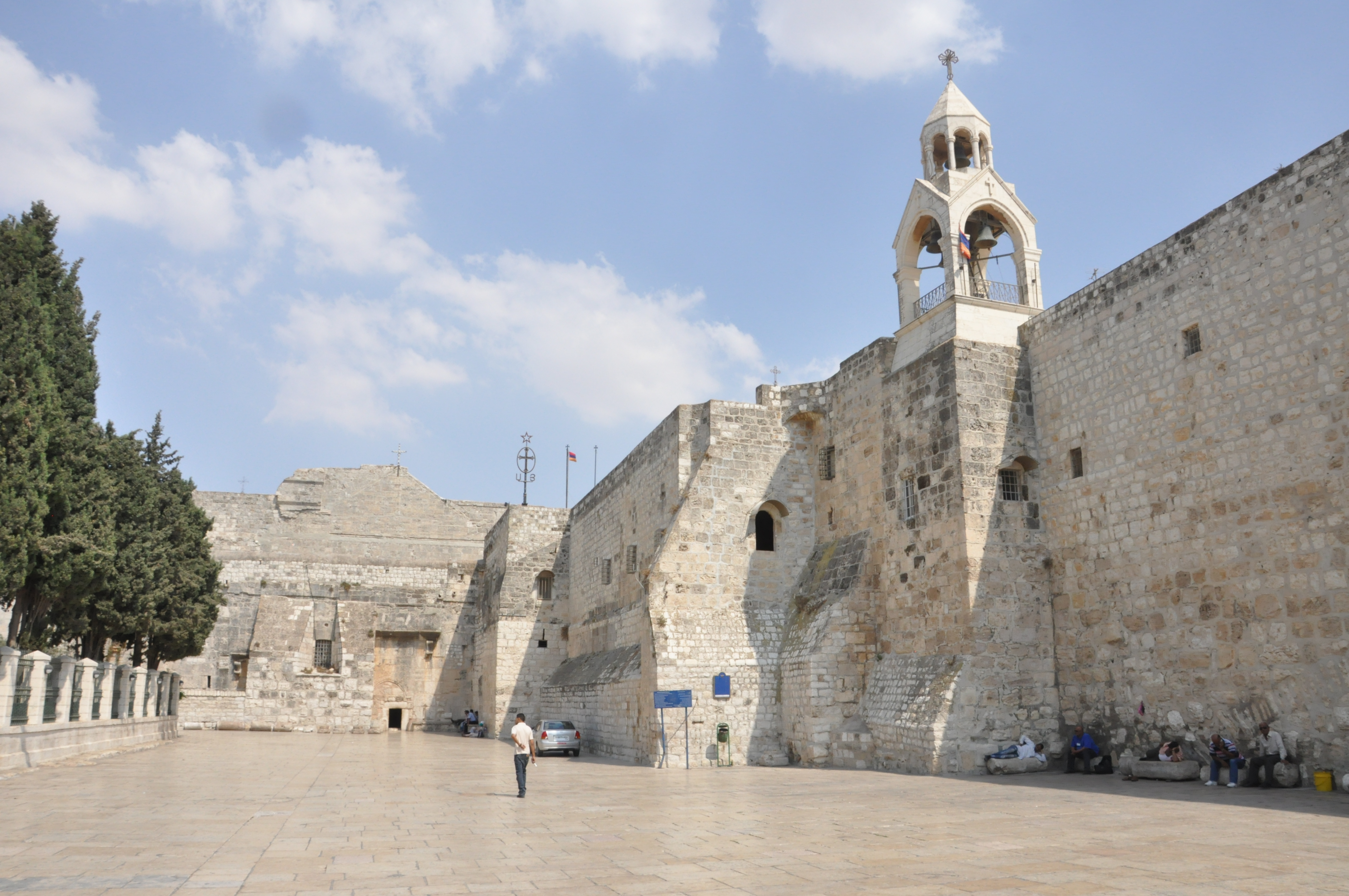
The Church of the Nativity in Bethlehem

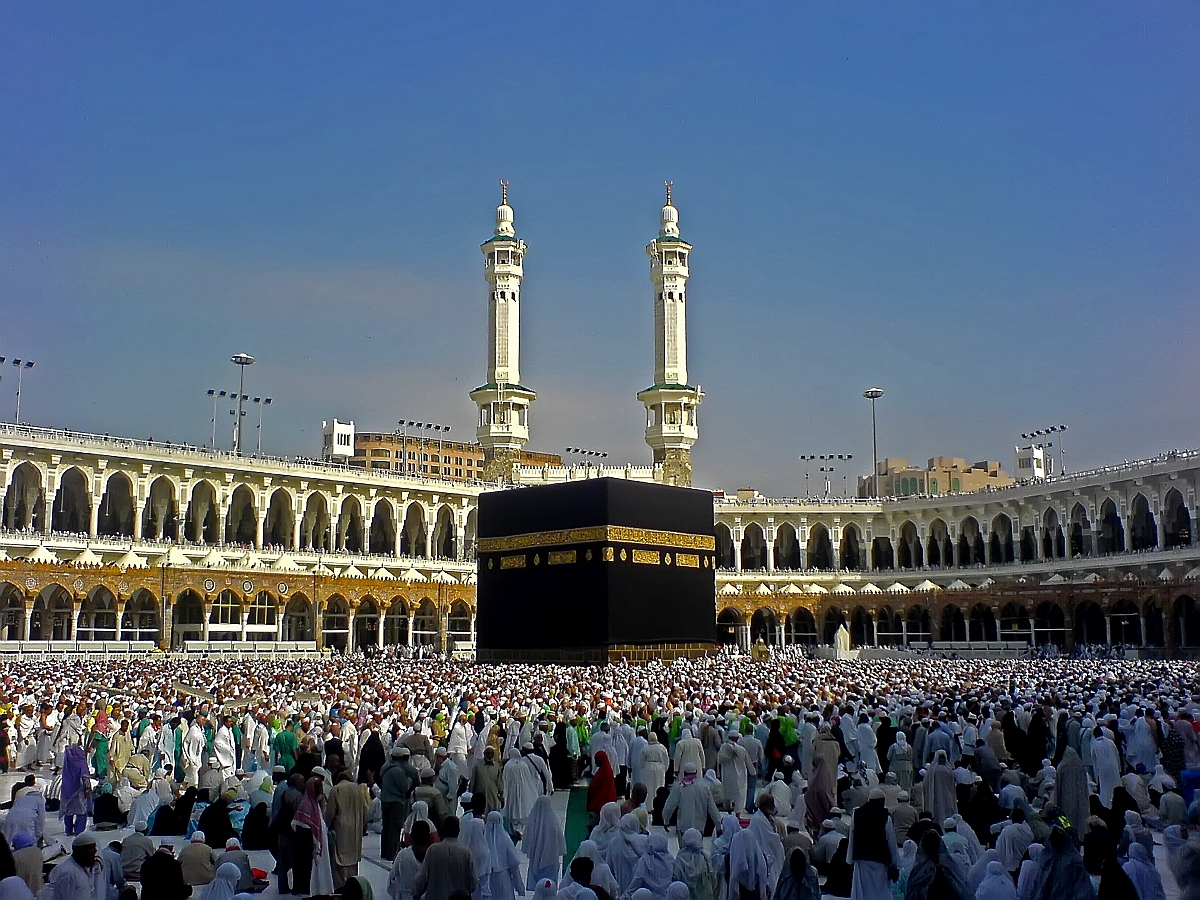
Pilgrims in the annual Hajj at the Kaabah in Mecca

The Abrahamic religions including Judaism, Christianity, Islam, Druze faith, and Baháʼí Faith originated in West Asia.

Judaism, the oldest of the Abrahamic faiths, is practiced primarily in Israel, the indigenous homeland and historical birthplace of the Hebrew nation: which today consists both of those Jews who remained in the Middle East and those who returned from the diaspora in Europe, North America, Ethiopia, India, and other regions, though various Israelite diaspora communities still exist worldwide. Jews are the predominant ethnic group in Israel (75.6%) numbering at about 6.1 million. Levels of Jewish religious observance vary within the Jewish State. Outside of Israel, there are small ancient Jewish communities in Turkey (17,400), Azerbaijan (9,100), Iran (8,756), India (5,000) and Uzbekistan (4,000), among many other places. As of 2016, there are am estimated 14.4–17.5 million (2016, est.) Jews alive in the world today, making them one of the smallest Asian minorities, at roughly 0.3–0.4& of the total population of the continent.

Christianity is a widespread religion in Asia, with more than 286 million adherents in 2010 according to Pew Research Center, and nearly 364 million according to Britannica Book of the Year 2014. Christians constitute around 12.6% of the total population of Asia. In the Philippines and Timor-Leste, Catholicism is the predominant religion; it was introduced by the Spaniards and the Portuguese, respectively. In Armenia and Georgia, Eastern Orthodoxy is the predominant religion. In the Middle East, such as in the Levant, Anatolia and Fars, Syriac Christianity (Church of the East) and Oriental Orthodoxy are prevalent minority denominations, which are both Eastern Christian sects mainly adhered to Assyrian people or Syriac Christians. Vibrant indigenous minorities in West Asia are adhering to the Eastern Catholic Churches and Eastern Orthodoxy. Saint Thomas Christians in India trace their origins to the evangelistic activity of Thomas the Apostle in the 1st century. Significant Christian communities also found in Central Asia, South Asia, Southeast Asia and East Asia.

Islam, which originated in the Hejaz located in modern-day Saudi Arabia, is the second largest and most widely-spread religion in Asia with at least 1 billion Muslims constituting around 23.8% of the total population of Asia. With 12.7% of the world Muslim population, the country currently with the largest Muslim population in the world is Indonesia, followed by Pakistan (11.5%), India (10%), Bangladesh, Iran and Turkey. Mecca, Medina and Jerusalem are the three holiest cities for Islam in all the world. The Hajj and Umrah attract large numbers of Muslim devotees from all over the world to Mecca and Medina. Iran is the largest Shia country.

The Druze originated in West Asia, is a monotheistic religion based on the teachings of figures like Hamza ibn Ali and al-Hakim bi-Amr Allah, and Greek philosophers such as Plato and Aristotle. The number of Druze people worldwide is around one million. Around 45–50% live in Syria, 35% to 40% live in Lebanon, and less than 10% live in Israel. Recently there has been a growing Druze diaspora.

The Baháʼí Faith originated in Asia, in Iran (Persia), and spread from there to the Ottoman Empire, Central Asia, India, and Burma during the lifetime of Bahá'u'lláh. Since the middle of the 20th century, growth has particularly occurred in other Asian countries, because Baháʼí activities in many Muslim countries has been severely suppressed by authorities. Lotus Temple is a big Baháʼí temple in India.

==== Indian and East Asian religions ====
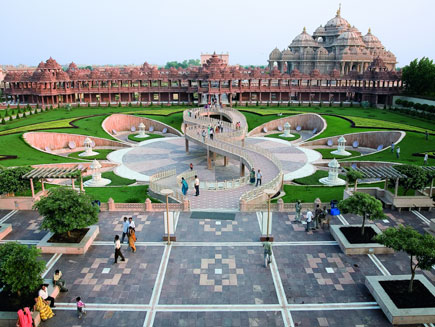
The Swaminarayan Akshardham Temple in Delhi, according to the Guinness World Records, is the World's Largest Comprehensive Hindu Temple.

Almost all Asian religions have philosophical character and Asian philosophical traditions cover a large spectrum of philosophical thoughts and writings. Indian philosophy includes Hindu philosophy and Buddhist philosophy. They include elements of nonmaterial pursuits, whereas another school of thought from India, Cārvāka, preached the enjoyment of the material world. The religions of Hinduism, Buddhism, Jainism and Sikhism originated in India, South Asia. In East Asia, particularly in China and Japan, Confucianism, Taoism and Zen Buddhism took shape.

As of 2012, Hinduism has around 1.1 billion adherents. The faith represents around 25% of Asia's population and is the largest religion in Asia. However, it is mostly concentrated in South Asia. Over 80% of the populations of both India and Nepal adhere to Hinduism, alongside significant communities in Bangladesh, Pakistan, Bhutan, Sri Lanka and Bali, Indonesia. Many overseas Indians in countries such as Burma, Singapore and Malaysia also adhere to Hinduism.

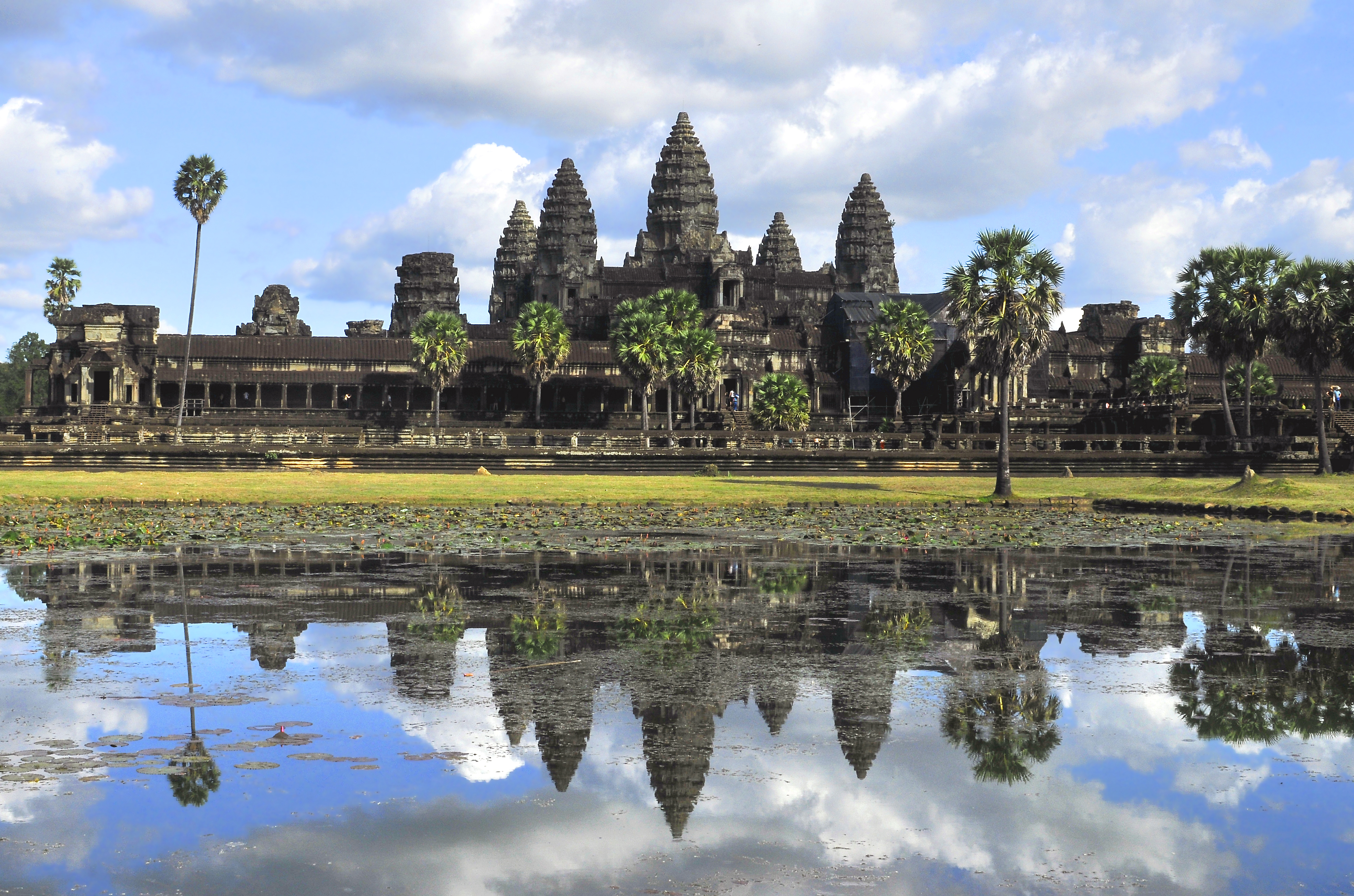
The Angkor Wat in Cambodia, a Hindu-Buddhist temple and the largest religious monument in the world

Buddhism has a great following in Mainland Southeast Asia and East Asia. Buddhism is the religion of the majority of the populations of Cambodia (96%), Thailand (95%), Burma (80–89%), Japan (36–96%), Bhutan (75–84%), Sri Lanka (70%), Laos (60–67%) and Mongolia (53–93%). Taiwan (35–93%), South Korea (23–50%), Malaysia (19–21%), Nepal (9–11%), Vietnam (10–75%), China (20–50%), Singapore (31%), North Korea (2–14%), and small communities in India and Bangladesh. The Communist-governed countries of China, Vietnam and North Korea are officially atheist, thus the number of Buddhists and other religious adherents may be under-reported.

Jainism is found mainly in India and in overseas Indian communities such as the United States and Malaysia. Sikhism is found in Northern India and amongst overseas Indian communities in other parts of Asia, especially Southeast Asia. Confucianism is found predominantly in mainland China, South Korea, Taiwan and in overseas Chinese populations. Taoism is found mainly in mainland China, Taiwan, Malaysia and Singapore. In many Chinese communities, Taoism is easily syncretised with Mahayana Buddhism, thus exact religious statistics are difficult to obtain and may be understated or overstated.

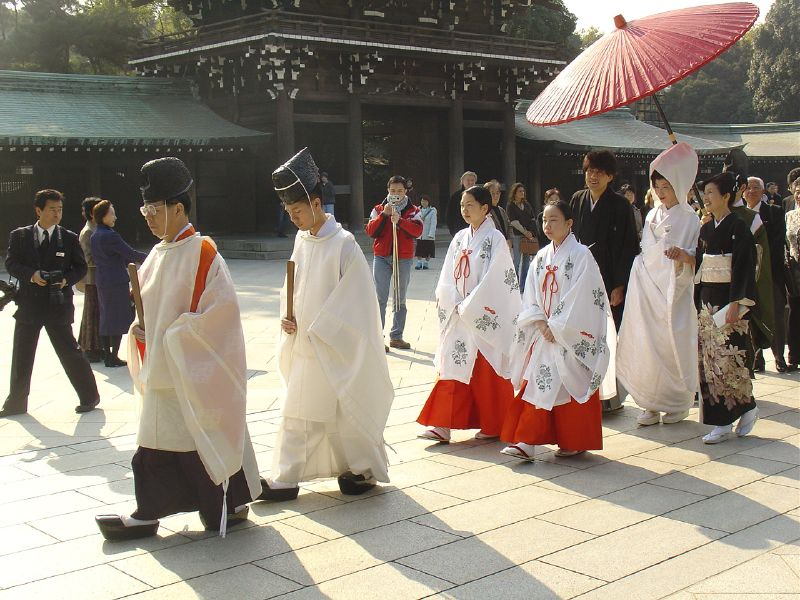
Japanese wedding at the Meiji Shrine

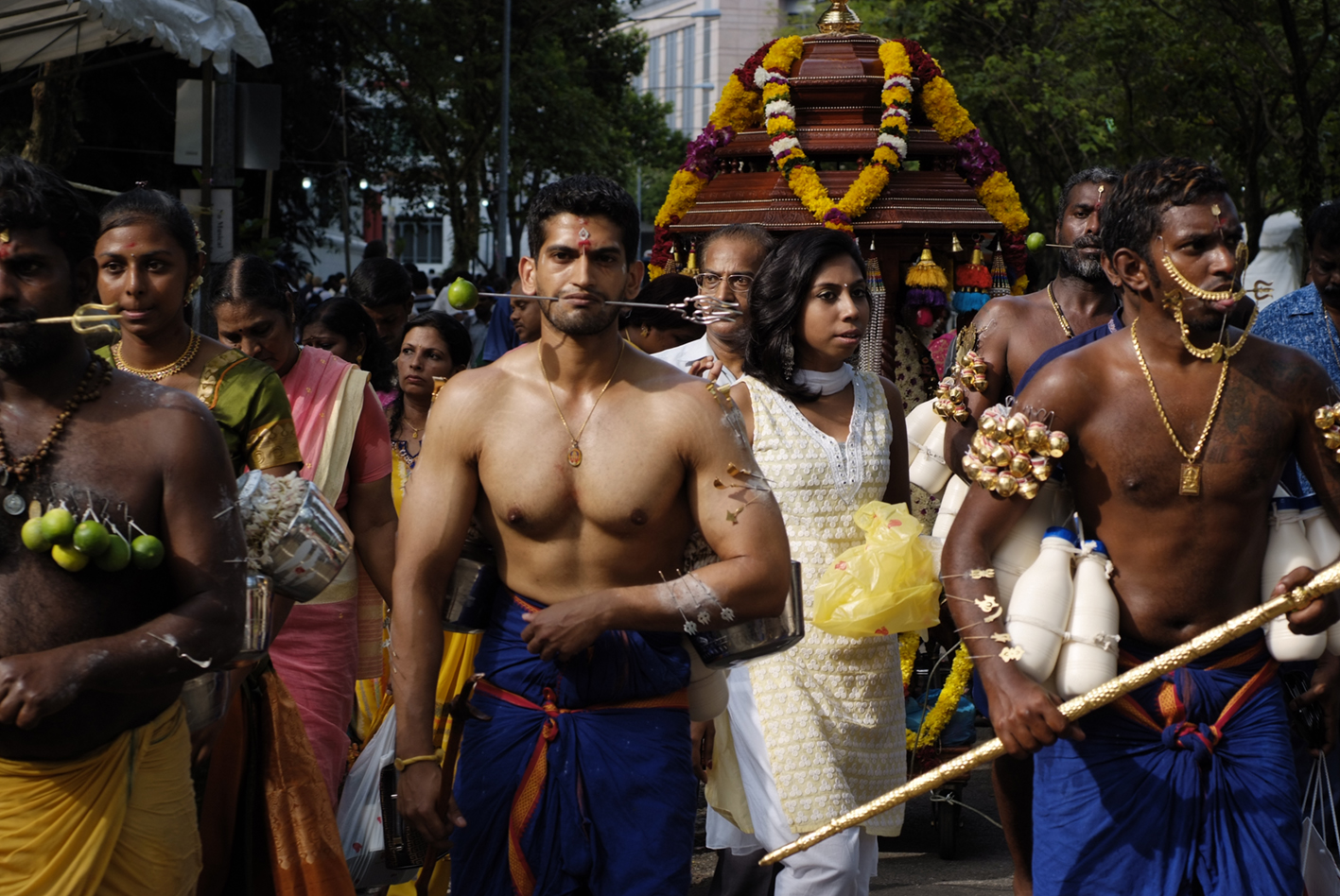
Hindu festival celebrated by Singapore's Tamil community

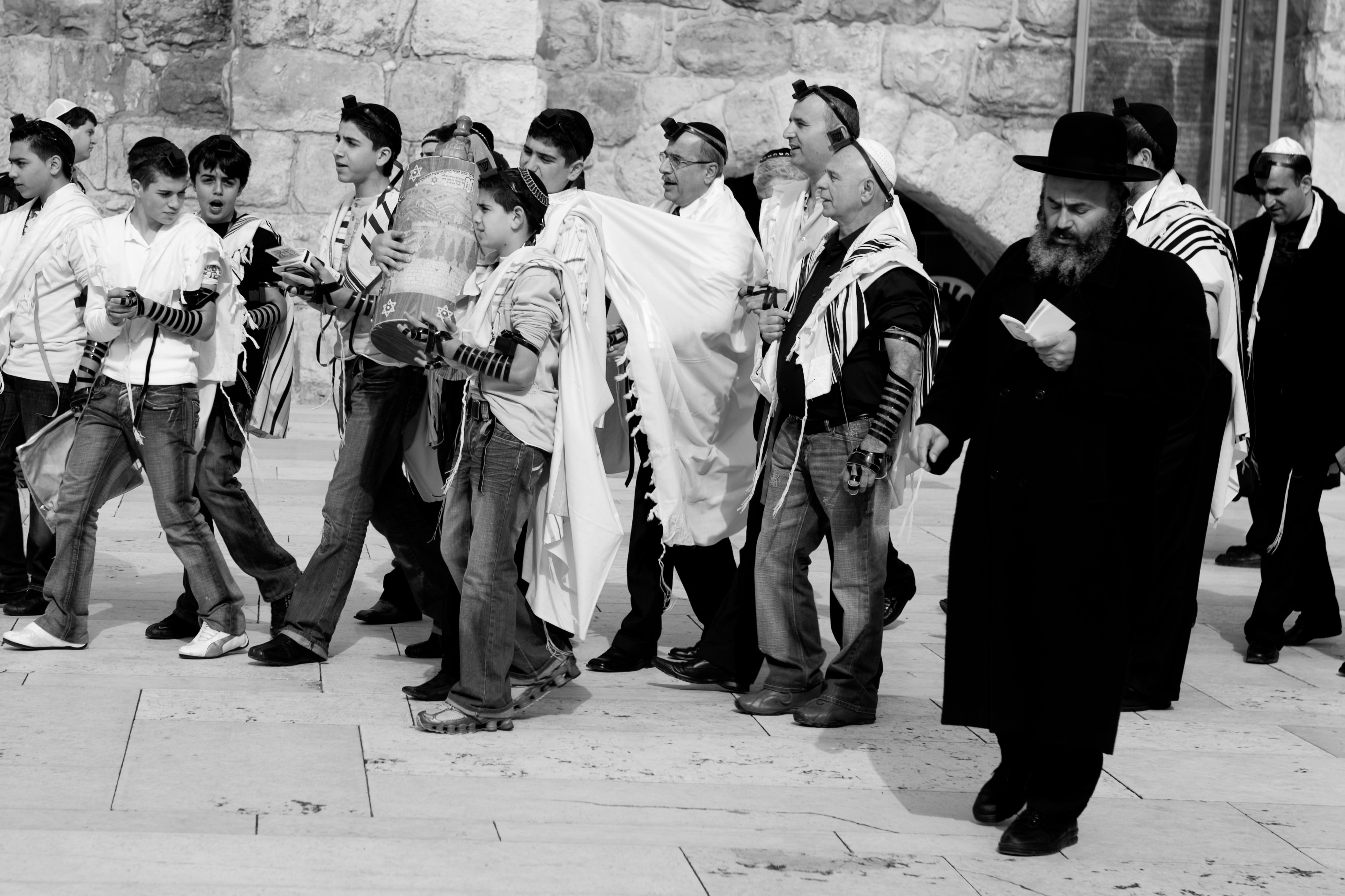
Bar mitzvah at the Western Wall in Jerusalem

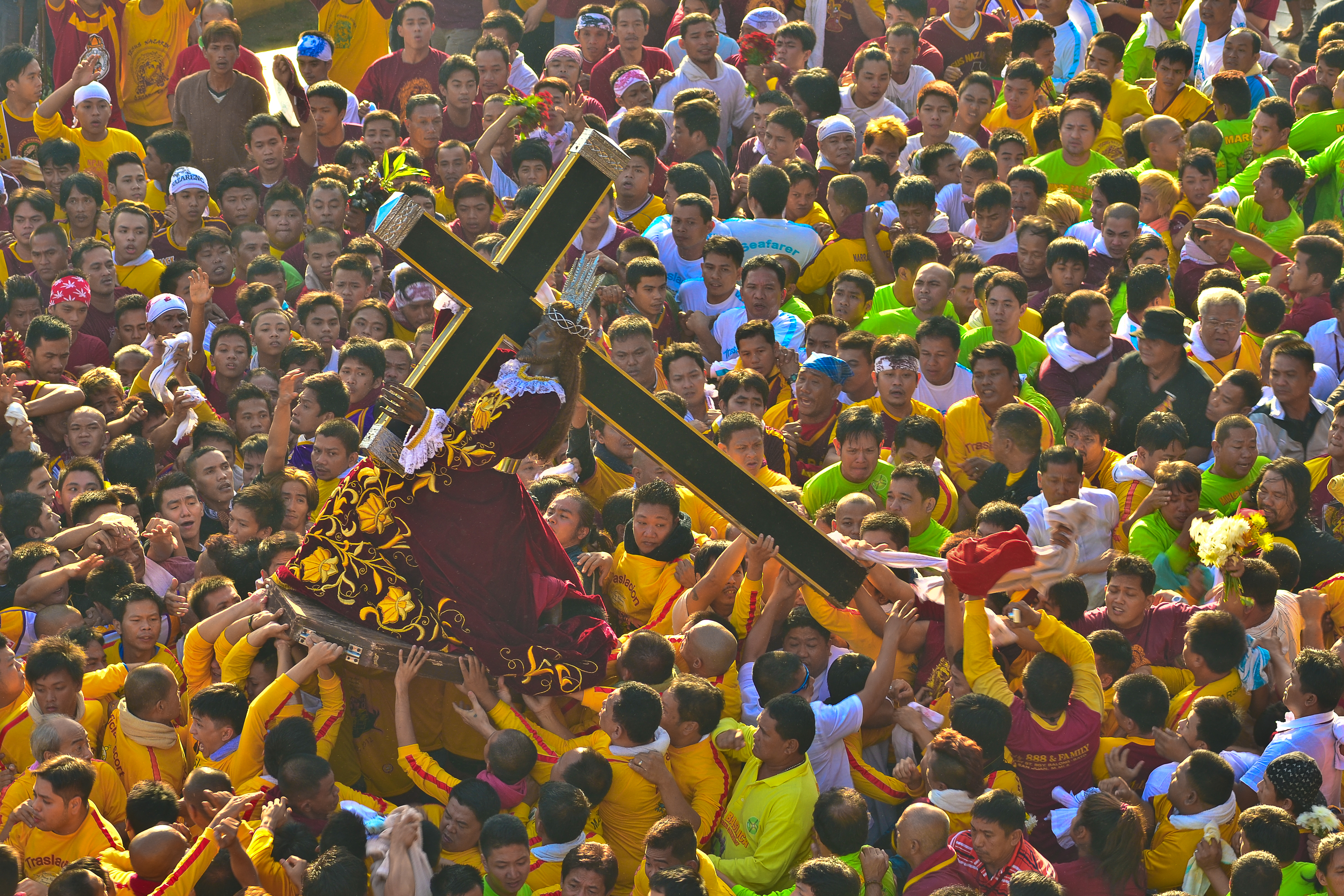
Catholic procession of the Black Nazarene in Manila

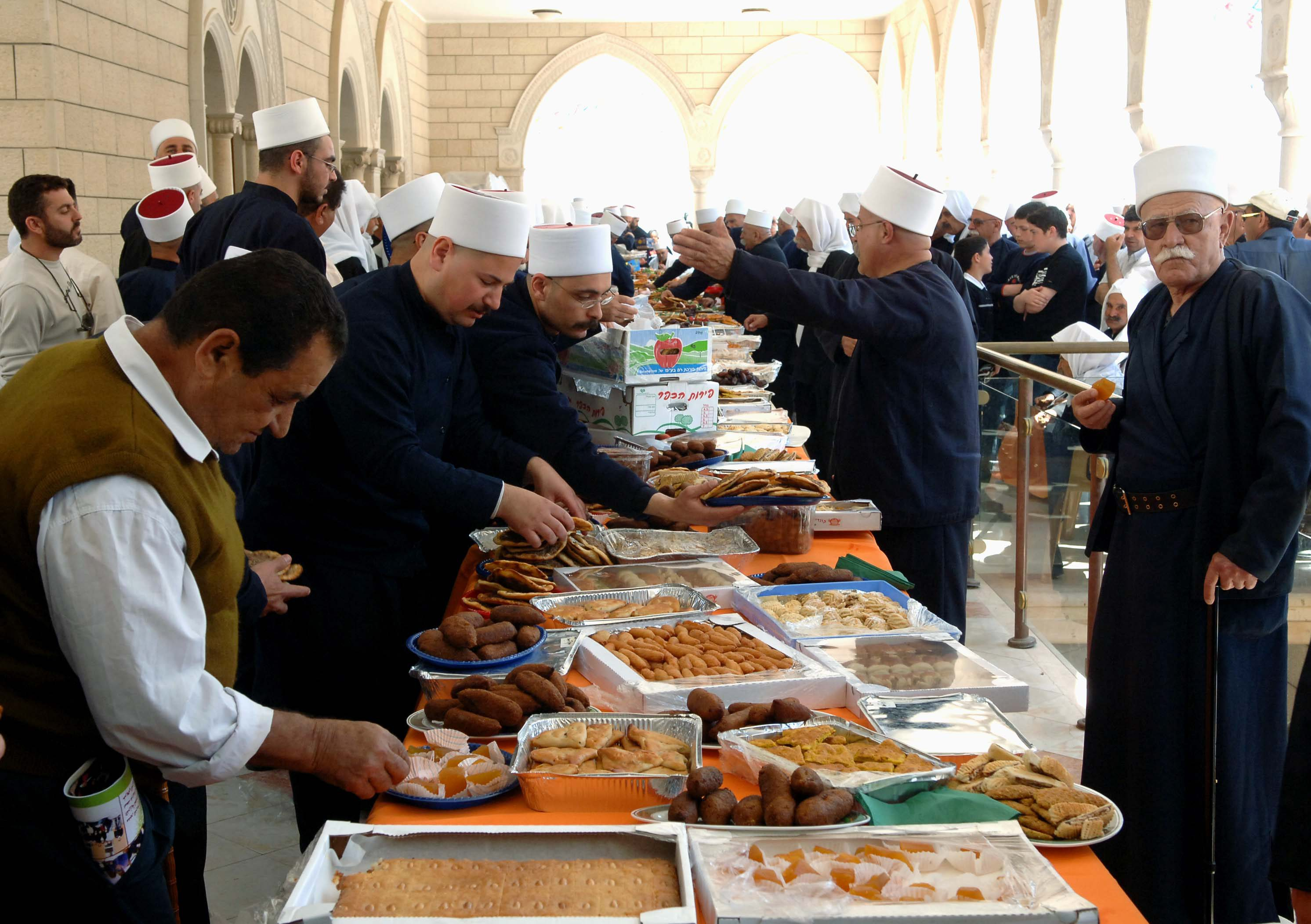
Druze dignitaries celebrating the Ziyarat al-Nabi Shu'ayb festival at the tomb of the prophet in Hittin

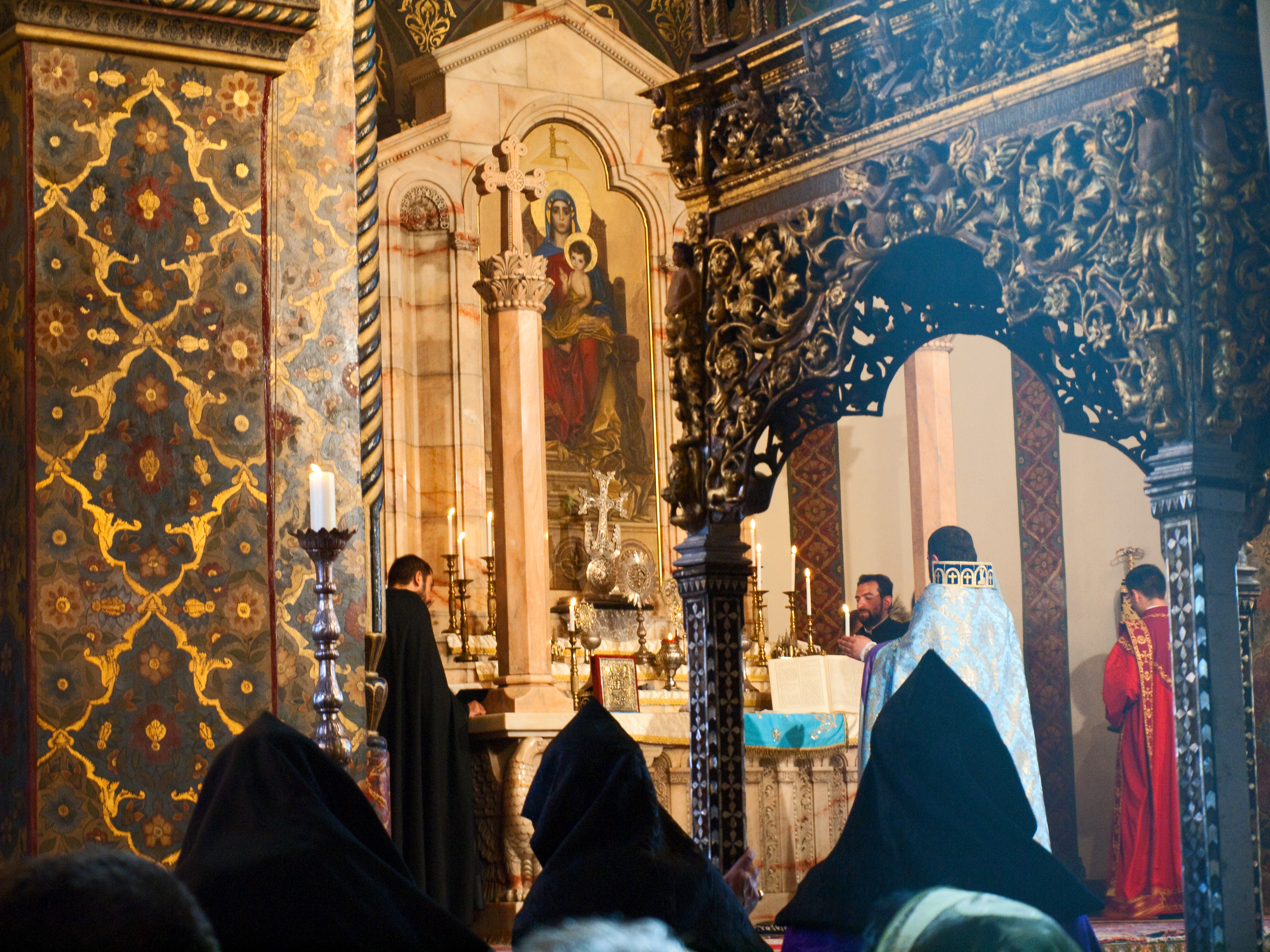
Christian Armenians praying at the Etchmiadzin Cathedral in Vagharshapat

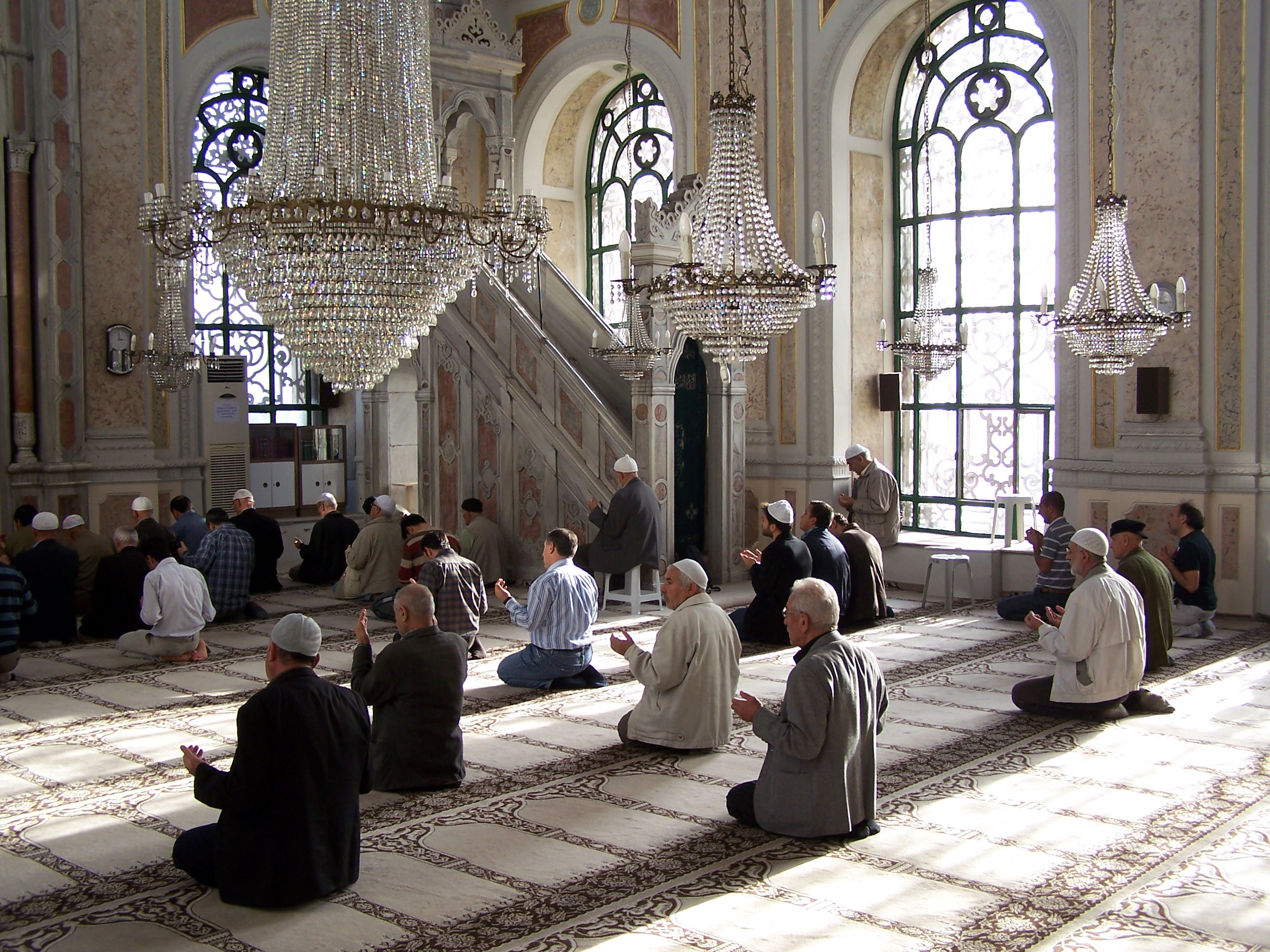
Muslim men praying at the Ortaköy Mosque in Istanbul

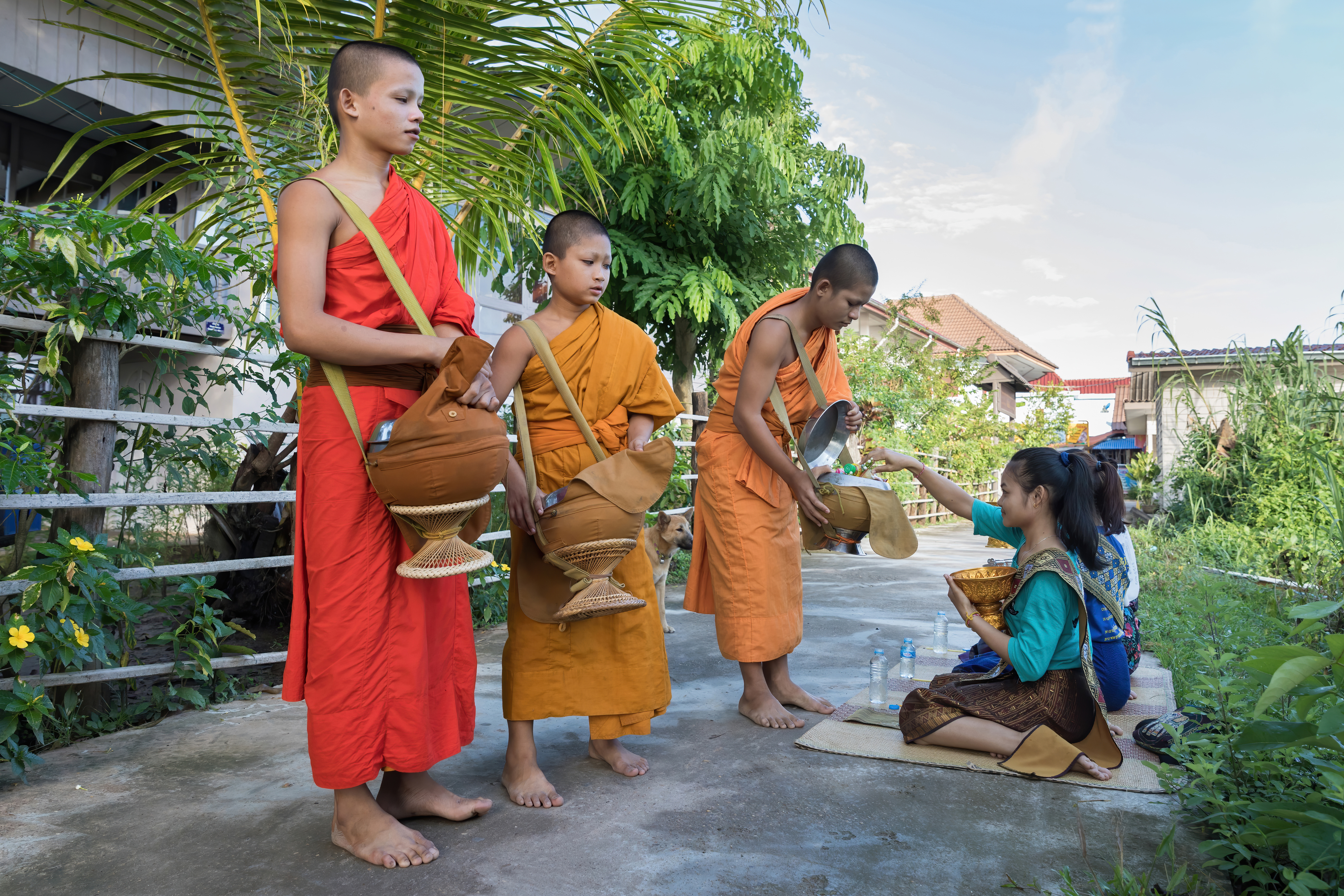
Buddhist monks in Laos collecting alms

== Culture ==
The culture of Asia is a diverse blend of customs and traditions that have been practiced by the various ethnic groups of the continent for centuries. The continent is divided into six geographic sub-regions: Central Asia, East Asia, North Asia, South Asia, Southeast Asia, and West Asia. These regions are defined by their cultural similarities, including common religions, languages, and ethnicities. West Asia, also known as Southwest Asia or the Middle East, has cultural roots in the ancient civilisations of the Fertile Crescent and Mesopotamia, which gave rise to the Persian, Arab, Ottoman empires, as well as the Abrahamic religions of Judaism, Christianity and Islam. These civilisations, which are located in the Hilly flanks, are among the oldest in the world, with evidence of farming dating back to around 9000 BCE. Despite the challenges posed by the vast size of the continent and the presence of natural barriers such as deserts and mountain ranges, trade and commerce have helped to create a Pan-Asian culture that is shared across the region.

=== Nobel laureates ===
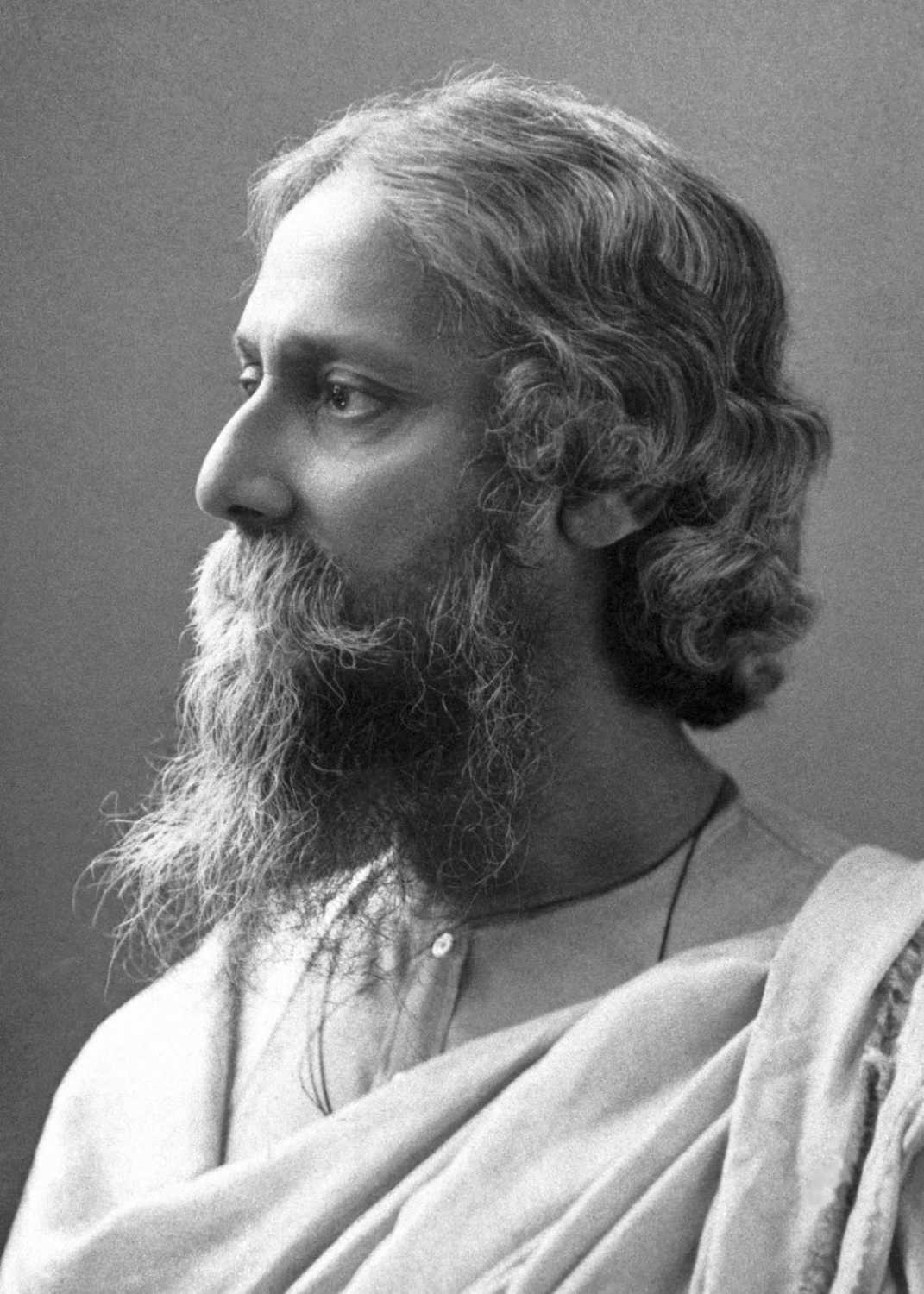
Rabindranath Tagore, winner of the Nobel Prize for Literature in 1913, and Asia's first Nobel laureate

Rabindranath Tagore, a Bengali dramatist and author from Santiniketan (now in West Bengal, India), won the Nobel Prize in Literature in 1913, becoming the first Asian Nobel laureate. The prize was awarded for Tagore's prose works and poetry, which had a significant additional impact on national literatures throughout the Western world. Tagore also authored both the Indian and Bangladeshi national anthems.

Other Asian writers who won Nobel Prize for literature include Yasunari Kawabata (Japan, 1968), Kenzaburō Ōe (Japan, 1994), Gao Xingjian (China, 2000), Orhan Pamuk (Turkey, 2006), Mo Yan (China, 2012), and Han Kang (South Korea, 2024). Some may consider the American writer, Pearl S. Buck, an honorary Asian Nobel laureate, having spent considerable time in China as the daughter of missionaries, and based many of her novels, namely The Good Earth (1931) and The Mother (1933), as well as the biographies of her parents for their time in China, The Exile and Fighting Angel, all of which earned her the Literature prize in 1938.

Mother Teresa of India and Shirin Ebadi of Iran were awarded the Nobel Peace Prize for their significant and pioneering efforts for democracy and human rights, especially for the rights of women and children. Ebadi is the first Iranian and the first Muslim woman to receive the prize. Another Nobel Peace Prize winner is Aung San Suu Kyi from Burma for her peaceful and non-violent struggle under a military dictatorship in Burma. She is a nonviolent pro-democracy activist and leader of the National League for Democracy in Burma (Myanmar) and a noted prisoner of conscience. She is a Buddhist and was awarded the Nobel Peace Prize in 1991. Chinese dissident Liu Xiaobo was awarded the Nobel Peace Prize for "his long and non-violent struggle for fundamental human rights in China" on 8 October 2010. He is the first Chinese citizen to be awarded a Nobel Prize of any kind while residing in China. In 2014, Kailash Satyarthi from India and Malala Yousafzai from Pakistan were awarded the Nobel Peace Prize "for their struggle against the suppression of children and young people and for the right of all children to education".

C.V. Raman is the first Asian to get a Nobel prize in Sciences. He won the Nobel Prize in Physics "for his work on the scattering of light and for the discovery of the effect named after him".

Japan has won the most Nobel Prizes of any Asian nation with 24 followed by India which has won 13.

Amartya Sen (b. 1933) is an Indian economist who was awarded the 1998 Nobel Memorial Prize in Economic Sciences for his contributions to welfare economics and social choice theory, and for his interest in the problems of society's poorest members.

Other Asian Nobel Prize winners include Subrahmanyan Chandrasekhar, Abdus Salam, Robert Aumann, Menachem Begin, Aaron Ciechanover, Avram Hershko, Daniel Kahneman, Shimon Peres, Yitzhak Rabin, Ada Yonath, Yasser Arafat, José Ramos-Horta and Bishop Carlos Filipe Ximenes Belo of Timor-Leste, Kim Dae-jung, and 13 Japanese scientists. Most of the said awardees are from Japan and Israel except for Chandrasekhar and Raman (India), Abdus Salam (Pakistan), Arafat (Palestinian Territories), Kim (South Korea), and Horta and Belo (Timor-Leste).

In 2006, the Bangladeshi Muhammad Yunus of was awarded the Nobel Peace Prize for the establishment of Grameen Bank, a community development bank that lends money to poor people, especially women. He is known for the concept of micro credit which, allows poor and destitute people to borrow money. The borrowers pay back money within the specified period and defaulting is very low. Yunus also became the leader of an interim government after the 2024 Bangladesh quota reform movement. The Dalai Lama received the Nobel Peace Prize, in Oslo, Norway in 1989.

== See also ==
- Asian Century – Projected dominance of Asian politics and culture during the 21st century
- Asian cuisine – Culinary traditions of Asia
- Asian furniture – Type of furniture that originated in the continent of Asia
- Asian Games – Asian multi-sport event
- Asian Highway Network – International road network connecting Asia and parts of Europe
- Asian Monetary Unit
- Asian Para Games – Multi-sport event
- Eastern Mediterranean – Countries that are geographically located to the east of the Mediterranean Sea
- Eastern world – Countries predominantly situated in Asia
- Fauna of Asia – Native animals of Asia
- Flags of Asia
- List of cities in Asia
- List of metropolitan areas in Asia by population
- Trans-Asian Railway – Proposed railway across Europe and Asia

== Sources ==
This article incorporates text from a free content work. Licensed under CC BY 4.0 (license statement/permission). Text taken from Global Forest Resources Assessment 2025, Food and Agriculture Organization of the United Nations (FAO).

== Bibliography ==
- Lewis, Martin W.; Wigen, Kären (1997). The myth of continents: a critique of metageography. Berkeley: University of California Press. ISBN 978-0-520-20743-1.
- Ventris, Michael; Chadwick, John (1973). Documents in Mycenaean Greek (2nd ed.). Cambridge University Press.
