= The Big Wave (film) =

1961 film by Tad Danielewski and Pearl S. Buck

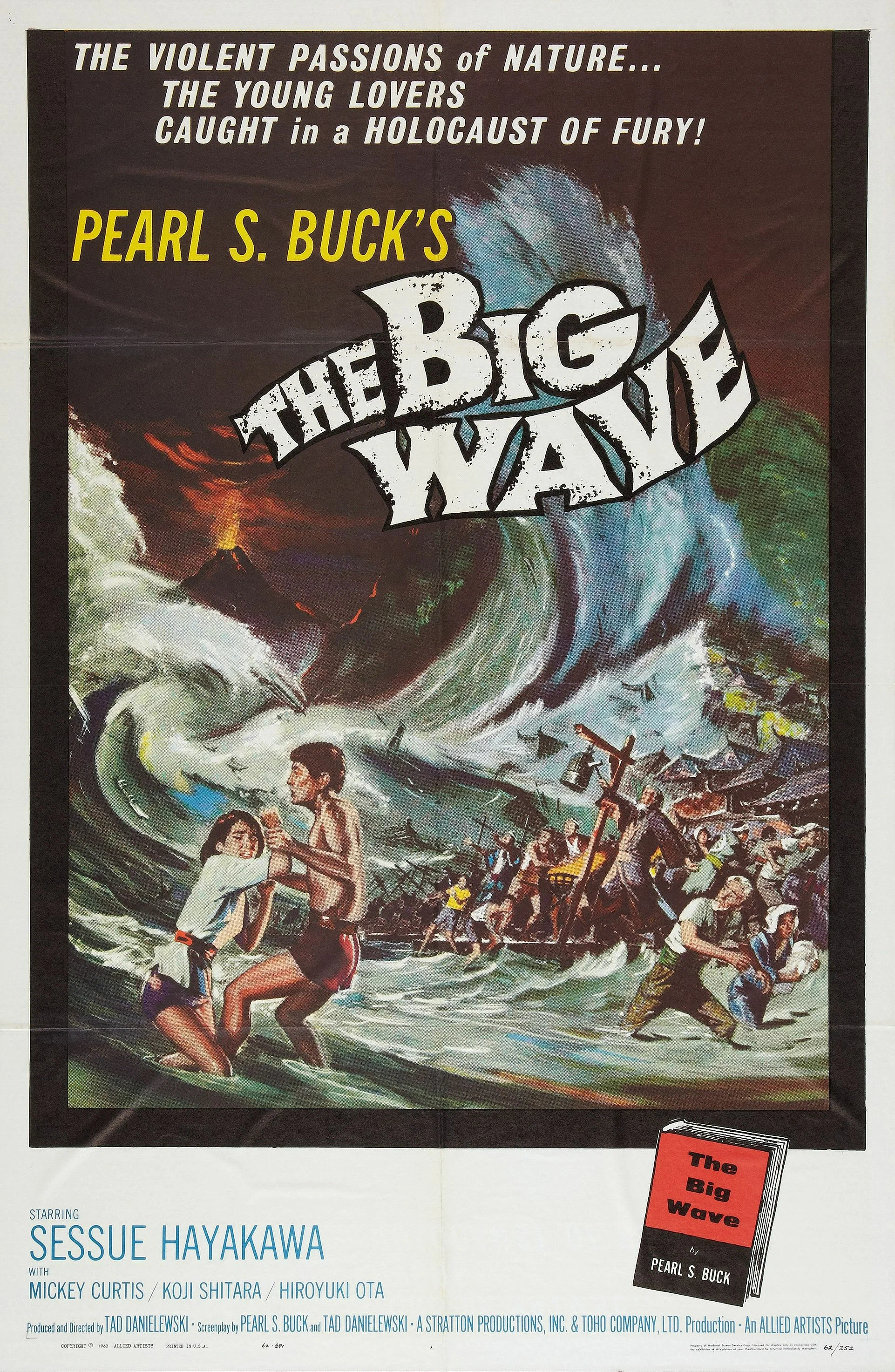
- Theatrical release poster by Reynold Brown
- Directed by: Tad Danielewski
- Screenplay by: Pearl S. Buck; Tad Danielewski
- Based on: The Big Wave by Pearl S. Buck
- Produced by: Tad Danielewski
- Starring: Sessue Hayakawa; Mickey Curtis; Koji Shitara; Hiroyuki Ota
- Cinematography: Ichio Yamazaki
- Edited by: Akikazu Kono
- Music by: Toshiro Mayuzumi
- Production companies: Stratton Productions; Toho
- Distributed by: Allied Artists Pictures
- Release dates: 1961 (Hirosaki and Niigata); April 1962 (United States)
- Running time: 98 minutes (original); 73 minutes (U.S.)
- Countries: United States; Japan
- Language: English

The Big Wave (Note: Japanese: 大津波, Hepburn: Daitsunami) is a 1961 melodrama film based on the 1948 novel by Pearl S. Buck. The film was directed and produced by Tad Danielewski from a screenplay co-written with Buck, and stars Sessue Hayakawa, Mickey Curtis, Koji Shitara, and Hiroyuki Ota. The story follows two boys, Yukio (played by Ota and Curtis) and Toru (Shitara and Ichizo Itami), growing up in a coastal village that is often threatened by natural disasters. Their friendship is strained when both develop feelings for the same ama girl, Haruko (Reiko Higa).

After working together on a 1956 television adaptation of The Big Wave for NBC, Buck and Danielewski formed the independent production company Stratton Productions. The film adaptation began development in early 1960. Buck visited Japan in May 1960 for the initial meetings but returned to the United States that June after her husband's death, briefly pausing her involvement. During pre-production, Japanese co-producer Toho appointed a Japanese co-director, who ultimately left due to conflicts with Danielewski. Principal photography lasted from September to November 1960, on location in Japan. It became a pioneering American-Japanese co-production and the film debut of both Buck and Danielewski. Buck later authored a memoir, A Bridge for Passing (1962), recounting her experiences during the film's production.

The Big Wave was screened in Hirosaki and Niigata in 1961, and released in the United States on April 29, 1962. It garnered mostly favorable reviews from Western critics, with praise for its acting, story, special effects, and cinematography, but criticism for the slow pacing. A lack of existing contemporary documentation has made its box office total, as well as exact screening dates in Japan, unknown. The film has since become largely unavailable to the general public. A print owned by the Kawakita Memorial Film Institute was screened in Unzen, Nagasaki on October 29, 2005, but has since been disposed of. As of 2018, the Library of Congress owned the only known remaining viewable print of the film.

== Plot ==
Yukio (farmer) and Toru (fisher) are two young friends who live in a coastal village on a Japanese island. One day, they travel to the local beach and meet a young pearl diver (ama) named Haruko, who gifts them an abalone and shows them her diving skills. Yukio's sister, Setsu, watches them, deciding she has a liking for Toru and wants to become an ama to impress him like Haruko.

On the village's annual shark hunting day, Toru, alongside his father and most of the villagers prepare for their trip, but are interrupted by the village's leader known as the "Old Gentleman", who warns them of a tsunami that he predicts will destroy the village, as it had happened thirty years ago on the same day. He urges everyone to flee to the hills, but he villagers disregard the Old Gentleman's advice and continue with their daily practices. That night, while Toru is staying at Yukio's house on a farm on the outskirts of the village, the nearby volcano erupts causing a massive wave that destroys the village and kills almost every villager, including Toru's family. Toru witnesses the tsunami and, devastated by the loss of his parents, faints. The wealthy Old Gentleman offers to adopt Toru, but Toru instead decides to live with Yukio's family (who live in poverty).

A decade later, Toru is adopted by Yukio's parents, and they live at their house with Setsu, who still has a crush on Toru. He remained audacious and has been saving money to buy a boat, eventually receiving an offer to purchase one from Haruko, who also has a crush on him. One day, Yukio and Toru go shark hunting with Setsu and Haruko. The two boys realize they both have developed feelings for Haruko over time. A fight soon breaks out between the two girls over who can be in a relationship with Toru, where Haruko unsuccessfully attempts to drown Setsu. Yukio and Toru ultimately get involved. After Toru throws Haruko aside, Yukio becomes enraged and assaults Toru. The fight concludes when Yukio reveals his love to Haruko, and Turo says he wants Setsu; the girls agree to marry them.

Toru and Setsu return to the now-rebuilt village and talk about their plans to get married and go fishing. Overheard by the Old Gentleman who resents the ocean since his son was killed while fishing three decades prior, instead offers the couple the largest farm in the area, adding that he would not warn them of any more tsunamis if they refuse. Nonetheless, they refuse, but suggest he should continue using his wisdom for good and still warn them anyway, to which he agrees.

== Cast ==
- Sessue Hayakawa as the Old Gentleman
- Ichizo Itami as Toru
  - Koji Shitara as young Toru
- Mickey Curtis as Yukio
    - Hiroyuki Ota as young Yukio
- Rumiko Sasa as Setsu
  - Judy Ongg as young Setsu
- Reiko Higa as Haruko
  - Sachiko Atami as young Haruko
- Heihachiro Okawa as Yukio's father
- Chieko Murata as Yukio's mother
- Tetsu Nakamura as Toru's father
- Frank Tokunaga as Toru's grandfather
- Shigeru Nihonmatsu as the old servant
- Noriko Sengoku as Toru's mother

Cast listing taken from the film's pressbook.

== Production ==
=== Development ===
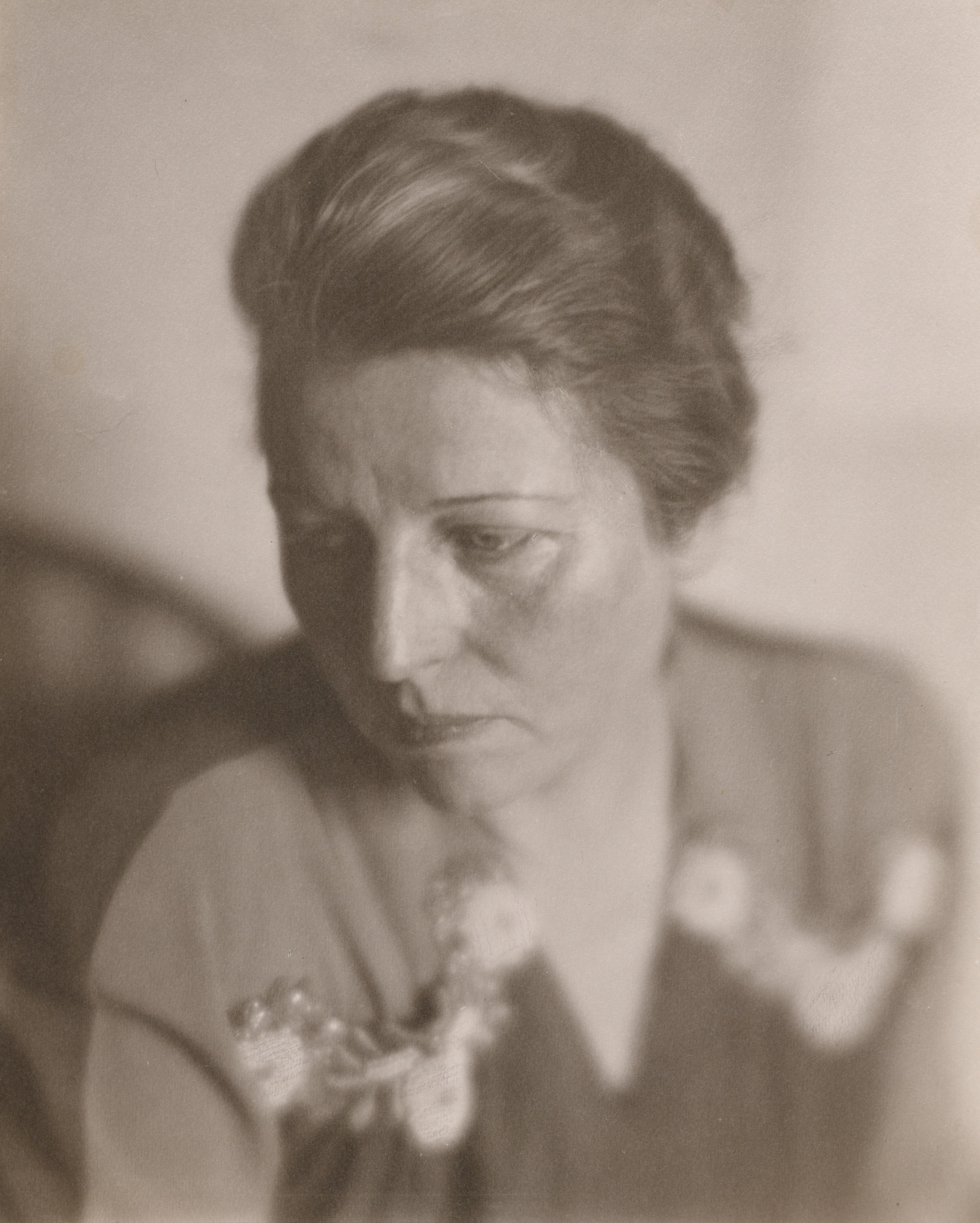
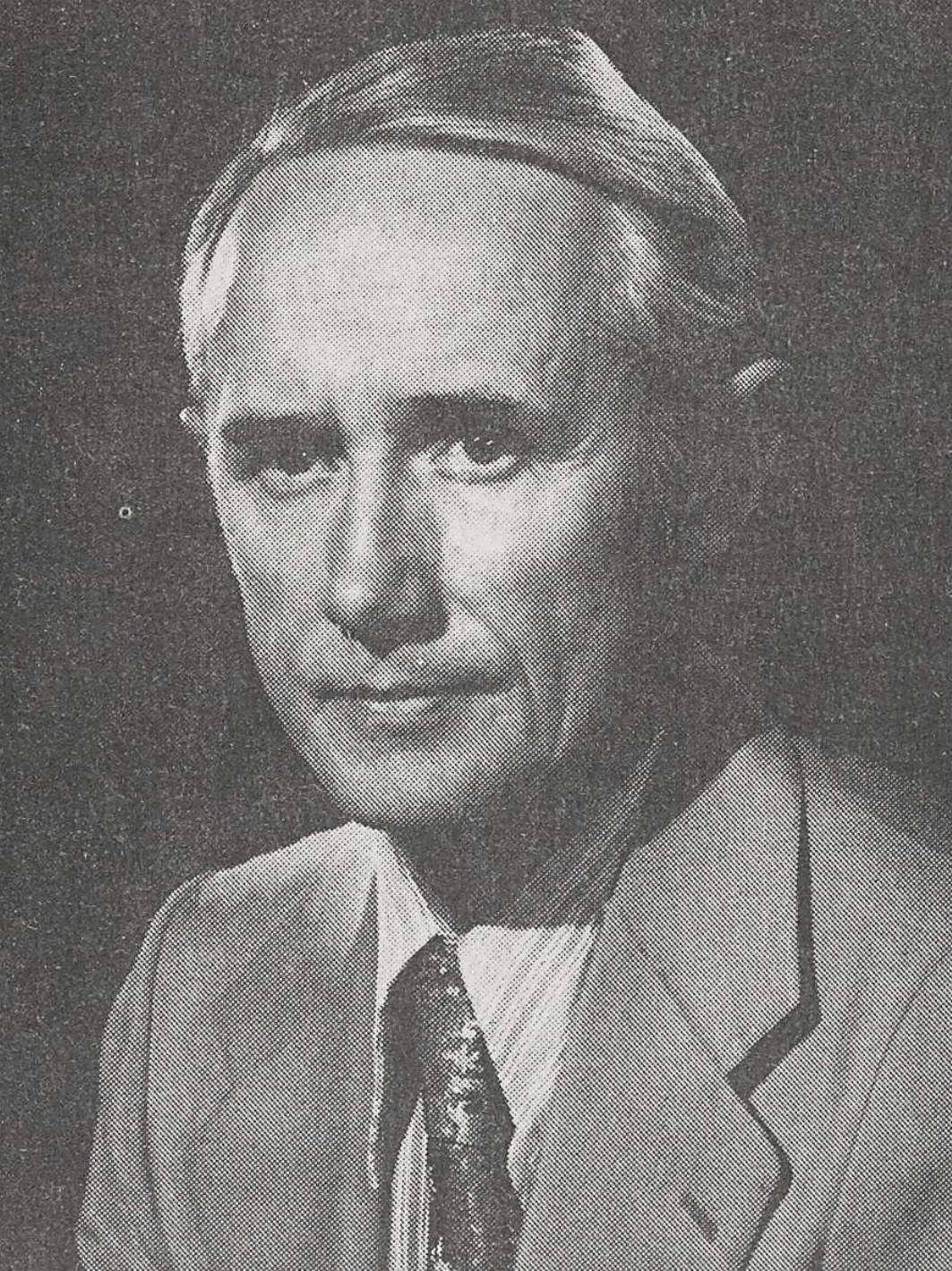
Writer Pearl S. Buck (left, pictured c. 1950) and director-producer Tad Danielewski (c. 1975)

While working at NBC in the mid-1950s, Tad Danielewski suggested to author Pearl S. Buck a televised adaptation of her 1948 novel The Big Wave, with Buck writing the script. Her script was ultimately adapted for an episode of the anthology television series The Alcoa Hour. Shot in color under the direction of Norman Felton, the episode starred Rip Torn and Robert Morse as the two Japanese village boys, and Hume Cronyn as the Wise Gentleman. It aired on NBC in September 1956, to acclaim from New York-based critics at the time, with The New York Times highlighting Buck's script. Buck said she was "only moderately pleased" with the episode itself, resenting the casting of white actors to play Asian characters. Danielewski was disappointed that he did not end up directing the adaptation of The Big Wave, but later worked with Buck by directing an adaptation of Buck's book The Enemy, which aired as an episode of Robert Montgomery Presents starring Shirley Yamaguchi. Following the episode's success, Buck and Danielewski became close friends.

In 1957, Buck and Danielewski founded the independent production company Stratton Productions named after Stratton Mountain. The company initially worked on stage productions before transitioning to film. After several unsuccessful plays, Danielewski proposed adapting The Big Wave into a film in early 1960, and insisted on filming it in Japan to reflect the story authentically. Buck, who served as the co-writer and executive producer, decided to use this as an opportunity to foster US-Japan cultural understanding through its production. The decision to make the film in Japan was made in April 1960, and development was first disclosed in the issue of Variety printed on May 4, 1960. On May 11, the Motion Picture Exhibitor reported that Allied Artists Pictures president Steve Broidy revealed that his company would acquire The Big Wave for release. It was reported at the time to be filmed in color and in CinemaScope.

Buck visited Tokyo on May 24 where she held the first meeting for the film's production; the Associated Press noted that it occurred on the same day as the tsunami resulted from the 1960 Valdivia earthquake that hit Northern Japan. She traveled back to the United States that June after being informed that her husband, Richard J. Walsh, had died during her absence. Although this briefly deferred her involvement, she returned to Japan to complete negotiations shortly thereafter. The film ultimately became Danielewski's feature directorial debut, and Buck's film debut. (Note: Buck had previously sold the film adaptation rights to three of her books, which became The Good Earth (1937), Dragon Seed (1944), and China Sky (1945). Per her: "They have a peculiar system in Hollywood; they won't let the author have anything to do with the film. I didn't like some of the things that were done, and so I decided to sell no more of my books until I could have some control over the filming.")

"The book, of course, had to be put into new form. The Big Wave is a simple story but its subject is huge. It deals with life and death and life again through a handful of human beings in a remote fishing village on the southern tip of the lovely island of Kyushu, in the south of Japan. The book has always had a vigorous life of its own. It has won some awards in its field, it has been translated into many languages, but never into the strange and wonderful language of the motion picture. To use that language was in itself adventure, not words now, but human beings, moving, talking, dying with courage, living and loving with even greater courage. I am accustomed to the usual arts. I have made myself familiar with canvas and brush, with clay and stone, with instruments of music, but the motion picture is different from all these. Yet it, too, is a great art. Even when it is desecrated by cheap people and cheap material, the medium is inspiring in its potential."

— Pearl S. Buck, A Bridge for Passing (1962)

The script of The Big Wave, co-written by Buck and Danielewski, was predominantly faithful to the novel. The pair expanded largely on the dialogue between the two protagonists Yukio and Toru, who in the original novel were named Kino and Jiya respectively. Setsu was, in the novel, depicted as more mischievous than her emotionally fragile counterpart in the film. The film's opening centers on ama divers, as Buck felt this would emphasize their importance in the Japanese coastal community; she had previously made no mention of ama in the novel.

=== Pre-production ===
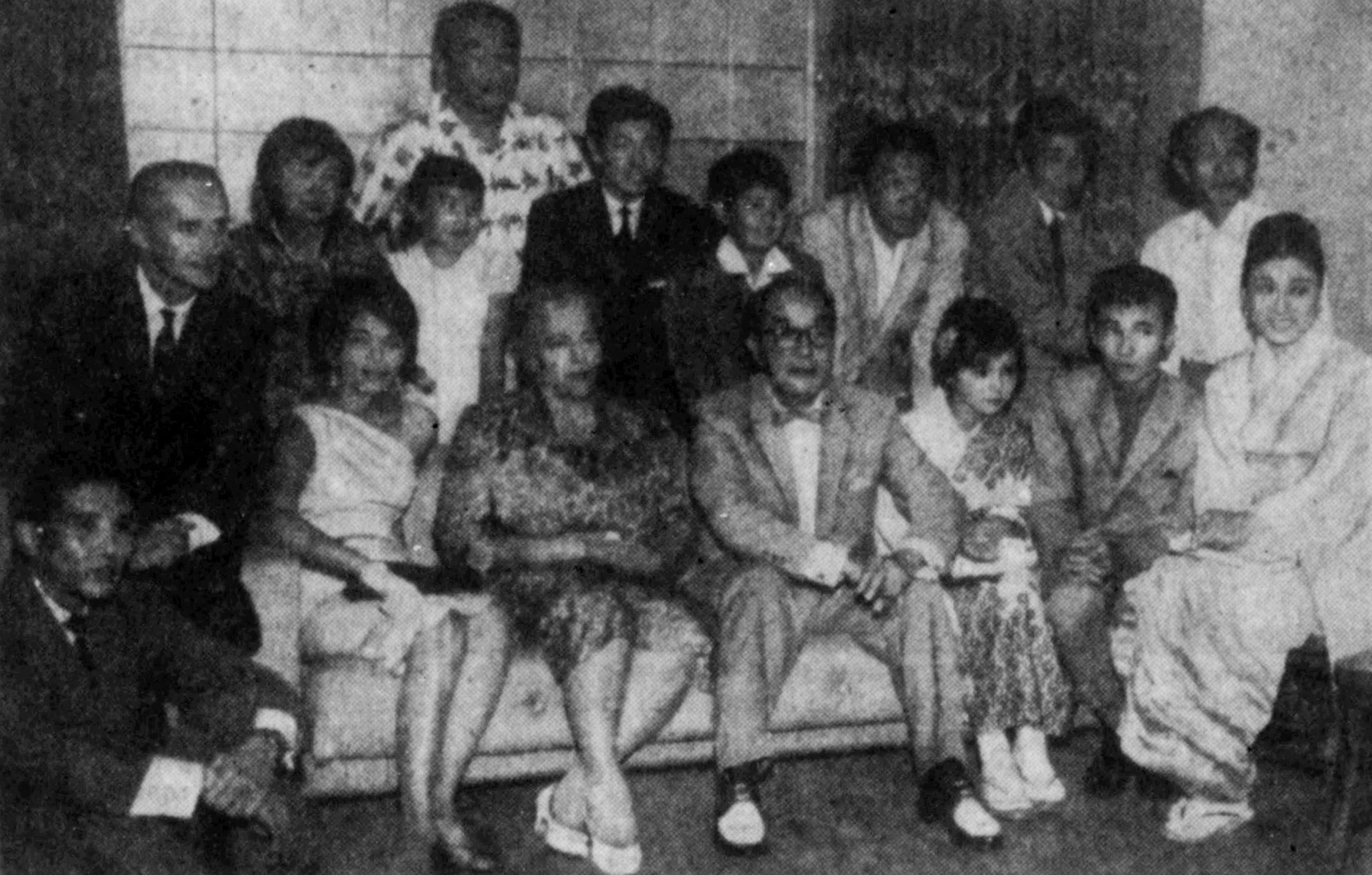
Cast and crew at the Imperial Hotel on September 8, 1960. From left to right (in the front row): Toshiro Mayuzumi, Tad Danielewski, Reiko Higa, Pearl S. Buck, Sessue Hayakawa, Rumiko Sasa, Mickey Curtis, and Chieko Murata.

Buck and Danielewski, representing Stratton Productions, reached an agreement with the Japanese company Toho granting distribution rights for The Big Wave in Japan, South Korea, and Taiwan, while Allied Artists remained the main distributor in the rest of the world. Toho in exchange provided special effects director Eiji Tsuburaya and four actors. Buck arranged for Toho to hire the Japanese cast and crew and secured full cooperation by agreeing to respect local customs. This meant adhering to Japanese wage standards and sustaining the local pay system without causing disruptions.

Around 200 people auditioned for the thirteen main roles in the film. The American crew were intent on finding Japanese actors who could speak English as they believed this would make the film more universally appealing. Danielewski believed that actors who often appeared in Japanese musical comedies were the best potential cast members as they had already been familiarize with Tin Pan Alley and trained to sing in English occasionally. He reportedly had to teach some of the Japanese cast the distinction between "l" and "r". Danielewski later described the cast as "the kindest, sweetest, hardest working, most wonderful people I have ever been associated with."

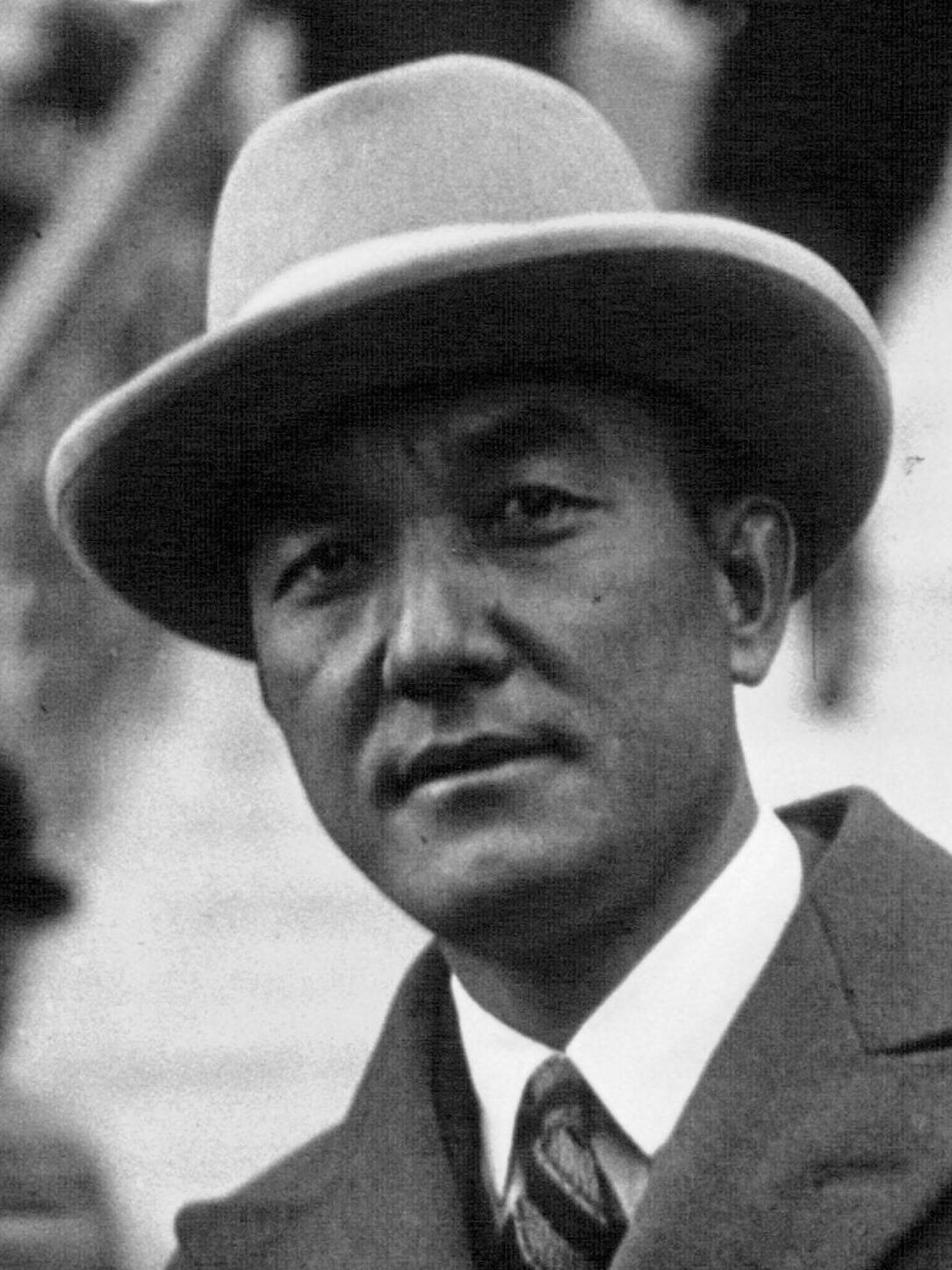
Sessue Hayakawa (pictured in 1923) was the first actor to secure a role in the film.

A press conference was held in Tokyo in late May 1960 to disclose pre-production details on the film; Buck and a Toho executive were among those in attendance. Casting negotiations had only begun a few weeks prior, and none had been finalized before the start of the conference. However, word soon reached Buck and the others that Sessue Hayakawa, at the time the most famous Japanese actor in the Western world, had just become the first to secure a role in the film fully, and they went forth to inform the press at the conclusion of the conference. Hayakawa had been working in Hollywood and Japan for decades and likely considered his appearance in The Big Wave as fulfilling his dream of starring in a co-production between the two countries. His wife, Tsuru Aoki, was also set to have a role, as reported in August 1960. (Note: Aoki is not listed in the final credits, but was later mentioned once again to be among the cast in a January 1961 report by The New York Times.) The Los Angeles Times remarked that the couple had starred in a similar American film, The Wrath of the Gods (1914).

All the adult Japanese cast were well-known in Japan, except Reiko Higa, who Buck said was "chosen especially for the ferocious abalone diving girl". Higa previously appeared in the American film Joe Butterfly (1957). Itami, who played Toru, was an employee of Daiei Film and the company's president, Masaichi Nagata, personally permitted his appearance via a courtesy call with Buck. Setsu was originally set to be played by Kyoko Takahashi, an actress who had worked for Toho's rival film company Toei, according to Japanese outlets. However, she was ultimately replaced by Rumiko Sasa from Toho, leaving Takahashi and the Japanese media discouraged. Variety attributed the casting change to Takahashi's contractual obligations.

While the Japanese production manager was helping find cast members, Buck and Danielewski, along with their assistants, went location scouting around Japan. They intended to find a location close to Tokyo as they wanted to remain close to the studio, focused mostly on finding an active volcano and landslides. In May 1960, they traveled to the Japanese island of Izu Ōshima, which Buck found was an easily accessible destination by boat that usually would only take a few hours to reach, and featured several fishing villages making it an ideal location for them. Unzen, where Buck had visited during her youth, was also chosen as a filming location. By late August, the scouting team, without Buck, had found additional locations for the film such as a beach, farm, and the village houses.

During location scouting, Buck realized the film's tsunami scene was beyond her team's level of expertise and could only be achieved through special effects, which she knew very little about. To her relief, she was informed that Toho had what was widely regarded as the best special effects team in the world, led by Tsuburaya. Soon after being assigned to the project, Tsuburaya met Buck and the additional co-producers in an office and presented his sketches of the tsunami. Buck described the sketches as "startlingly accurate water colors of the rising horizon, the onrushing wave, and the towering crash of the crest." During the meeting, Tsuburaya also announced plans to recreate the fishing village depicted in miniature form, which he would achieve by taking his cameraman along with him and photographing "everything" for reference.

I know how to behave like this in my own country. I will not behave like this in Japan. I must ask that the Japanese director be removed.

— Tad Danielewski during a dispute regarding the assigned Japanese co-director

Towards the end of pre-production, Toho appointed a Japanese director to co-direct the film with Danielewski. During a meeting with the famed Japanese director (unspecified in Buck's accounts) aided by an interpreter, Buck, Danielewski, Curtis, and Itami began discussing a scene Danielewski wanted Curtis and Itami to improvise. Upon Danielewski telling the Japanese director the way he wanted the scene to play out, the Japanese director began writing on paper his version of the scene and presented it to Danielewski and Buck. Danielewski was frustrated as he did not want written instructions for Curtis and Itami for this particular scene, and the two actors ultimately sided with him on the matter. Thereafter, Danielewski warned that he would quit directing and return to New York if the Japanese director was not removed, to Buck's shock. The interpreter informed Danielewski that the Japanese director is a well-regarded man locally, and disrespecting him could have dire consequences. Buck apologized to the director and interpreter, stating that "If we had just gone on location, it would have been worse", to which the director agreed and expressed compassion. After the dispute, the Japanese filmmaker resigned from working on the film.

The cast and central crew members met together at the Imperial Hotel on September 8, 1960. The Japan Times reported that the attendance of Curtis, Sasa, Higa, and composer Toshiro Mayuzumi hereby disclosed their involvement in the film, and that it would be shot around Nagasaki.

=== Filming ===
==== Principal photography ====
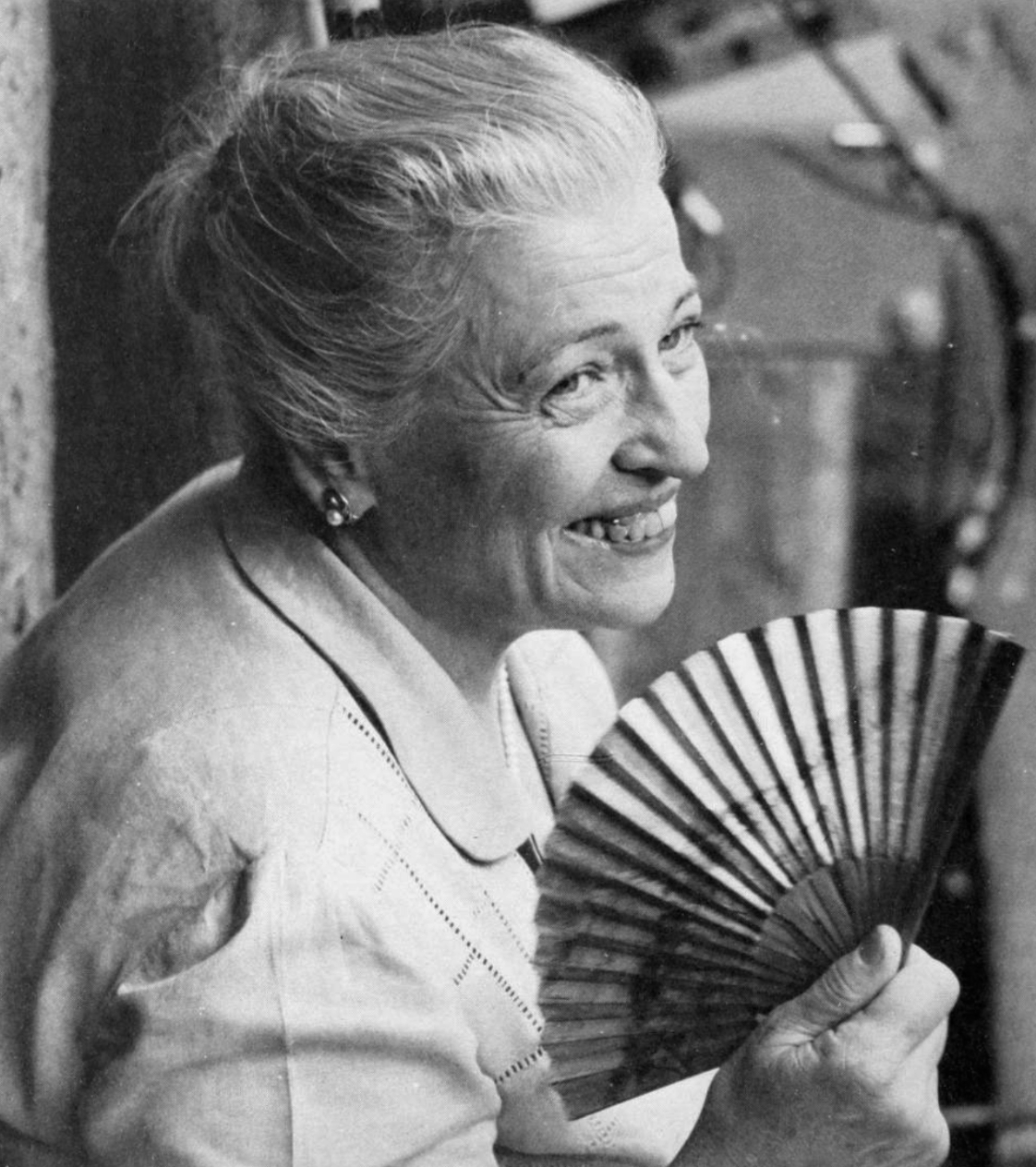
Pearl S. Buck during filming in 1960

Principal photography commenced on September 15, 1960, in Nagasaki Prefecture. As Buck's story was inspired by the 1792 Unzen landslide and tsunami, the film adaptation was mostly filmed on the island of Kyushu around Mount Unzen. Shooting locations in the area included the towns of Obama, Chijiwa (both now part of Unzen City), and another formally known as Kitsu. Buck identified the latter as the fishing village that was entirely swept away by the 1792 tsunami and later rebuilt. Ichio Yamazaki served as the cinematographer, shooting in black-and-white; his previous credits include Akira Kurosawa's The Lower Depths (1957) and The Hidden Fortress (1958).

The film's production in Japan garnered significant media attention, partly due to Buck's popularity in the country. Locals warmly welcomed the American crew during filming in Japanese towns, where they were closely observed with keen interest. To achieve authenticity, most interior scenes were filmed in the actual homes of welcoming Obama residents rather than on sets, and some residents participated as extras. Unzen's Chijiwa Beach was also used for several sequences. Japan-based assistant director Joe Markaroff, who worked on many American productions in Japan, said that the villager's leader allowed the crew to shoot on the beach in exchange for a three-dollar can of seaweed.

Itami's schedule prevented him from working on the film for the first couple of weeks of photography. During his absence, his wife, Kazuko Kawakita, served as an assistant to the American crew, as she could speak fluent English. Kawakita's mother, Kashiko, was also involved in the making of the film. A release print was later held at Kashiko's film foundation, the Kawakita Memorial Film Institute.

Buck supervised filming (Note: Per biographer Nora B. Strling: "Pearl's presence would lend prestige and support. Actually she was also there because she was suffering the malaise of jealousy, and justified or not, was suspicious and unhappy. [Literary agent] Dorothy Olding received word that Pearl was there to prevent any American-Japanese incidents that might roil international relations.") and found working on the film enjoyable and a form of escapism, expressing that she was still overwhelmed by grief due to her husband's recent death. However, according to biographer Peter Conn, Buck privately confided that she found her husband's death a source of relief. While filming in Obama, Buck stayed in a fisherman's hut and employed a shipwrecked Chinese refugee woman as her maid. Speaking fluent Chinese, Buck surprised the woman, who knew neither English nor Japanese, with a conversation on their first day together. In her excess time, Buck met several Japanese celebrities, including Miki Sawada, the founder of an orphanage and adoption agency for American-Japanese mixed children. (Note: Buck also visited Korea, discovering many more children of Asian mothers and U.S. military fathers, who faced discrimination and were often orphaned. She later coined and popularized the term "Amerasians" for these children.) Buck also wrote letters that were later assembled, at the encouragement of Allied Artists executives, into a book titled A Bridge for Passing, which detailed her experiences during the making of the film. The memoir was later published as a book on April 2, 1962.

Although most of the cast was moderately fluent in English, Sasa struggled to learn the language and memorize her lines, describing her nightly pronunciation lessons as the "hour of terror". Danielewski's wife served as the dialect coach, and actress Yoshiko Yamaguchi visited the set to support Sasa. While generally compliant with directions, Sasa, during a beach-running scene, refused a request to roll up the sleeves of a red undershirt worn under her yukata, arguing it was not a Japanese custom and would misrepresent her culture abroad. She also observed that Danielewski seemed inexperienced, avoided storyboards, preferring to improvise scenes on location, and employed fewer assistant directors than typical in Japanese films. Sasa later stated that she "didn't sense any talent in the director".

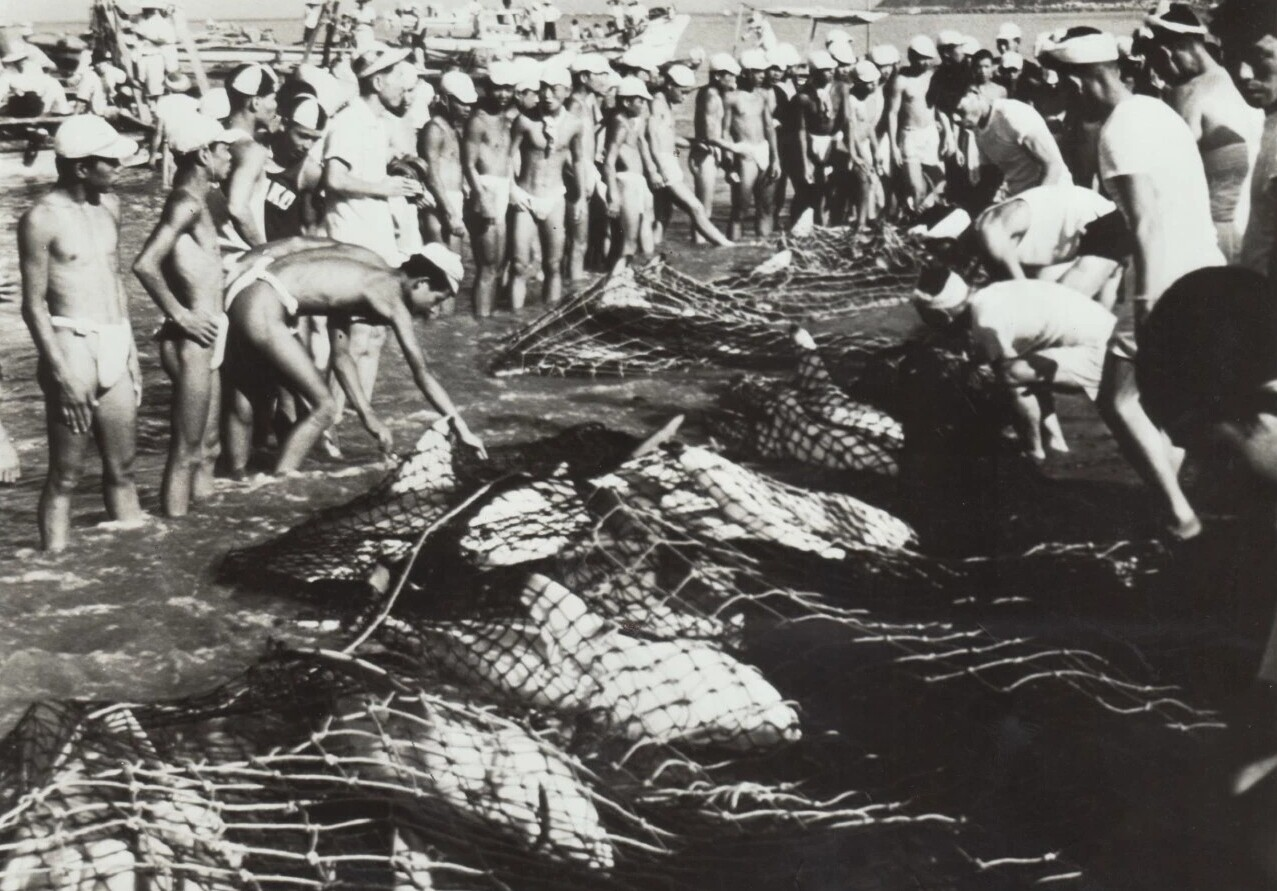
Men on the beach handling the shark-filled net after the shark hunt was filmed.

One of the scenes depicts the annual shark hunt, held near Obama and Chijiwa, and conducted to safeguard the local fish populations. Using bait fish, around 200 fishing boats trapped sharks in a vast net, which Buck described as seemingly the world's largest and strongest net. The boats encircled the sharks, and once the net was full, hundreds of men on the beach hauled it ashore and clubbed the sharks to death. They used most of the shark meat for food, with the remains also processed into oil and fertilizer. The hunt yielded 120 sharks, a significant increase from the single shark caught the previous year. Buck admired the boat fleet but found the sharks' killing unsettling. While the hunt was ongoing, Buck, alongside Hayakawa and 15-year-old actress Sachiko Atami, was on a boat watching the filming together. At one point, a four-foot-long shark escaped the net and leapt into their boat near Atami, prompting Buck to scream. Hayakawa then swiftly grabbed the shark by its tail and threw it back into the sea, likely saving Atami from serious injury.

Controversy surrounded the filming of the ama divers. A Japanese assistant who helped shoot the film's underwater footage was outraged with how the ama were initially portrayed in Buck's script, calling it "sexist". After threatening to quit if it was not revised, he was eventually allowed to rewrite a scene featuring the ama himself. The crew considered filming the ama in their regular clothing, often solely relegated to a Japanese undergarment, however, the American co-producers thought it was unacceptable and demanded they be filmed wearing brassieres instead. The divers refused to wear bras for the film at first, considering it improper. Two versions of the ama scenes were ultimately shot, with one for American audiences wherein the ama wear brassieres.

Weather conditions resulted in several delays, leaving the villagers and crew frustrated. At the end of a twelve-hour day on location at a farmhouse, most of which the crew had waited for the rain to end in order to shoot there, Yamazaki fell onto some rocks at the base of a paddy field once filming had concluded and had to be hospitalized. His doctor reported that he had not fractured any bones, but put Yamazaki's right arm in a sling. However, Yamazaki refused to remain at the hospital and went back to the hotel with Buck and the other crew members shortly thereafter, determined to continue filming. Other issues that occurred during photography at the farm included the sudden absence of rain that prompted the crew to simulate rain using a bamboo with holes to sprinkle water. The crew expected a duck brought in to be Setsu's pet as per the script, but the one brought in ended up being a larger one than they expected, and a rampant dog chasing chickens, which disrupted filming.

A Japanese holiday delayed filming by at least three days, forcing all of Hayakawa's remaining scenes to be shot in a desert on the final day of his contract. During breaks, Hayakawa typically slept, provided with cushions and a pillow, or listened to a fight on a transistor radio to cope with the heat under the makeup. His makeup man applied iced towels to his wrists and neck and maintained his fake beard, which was at risk because Hayakawa often smoked large cigars.

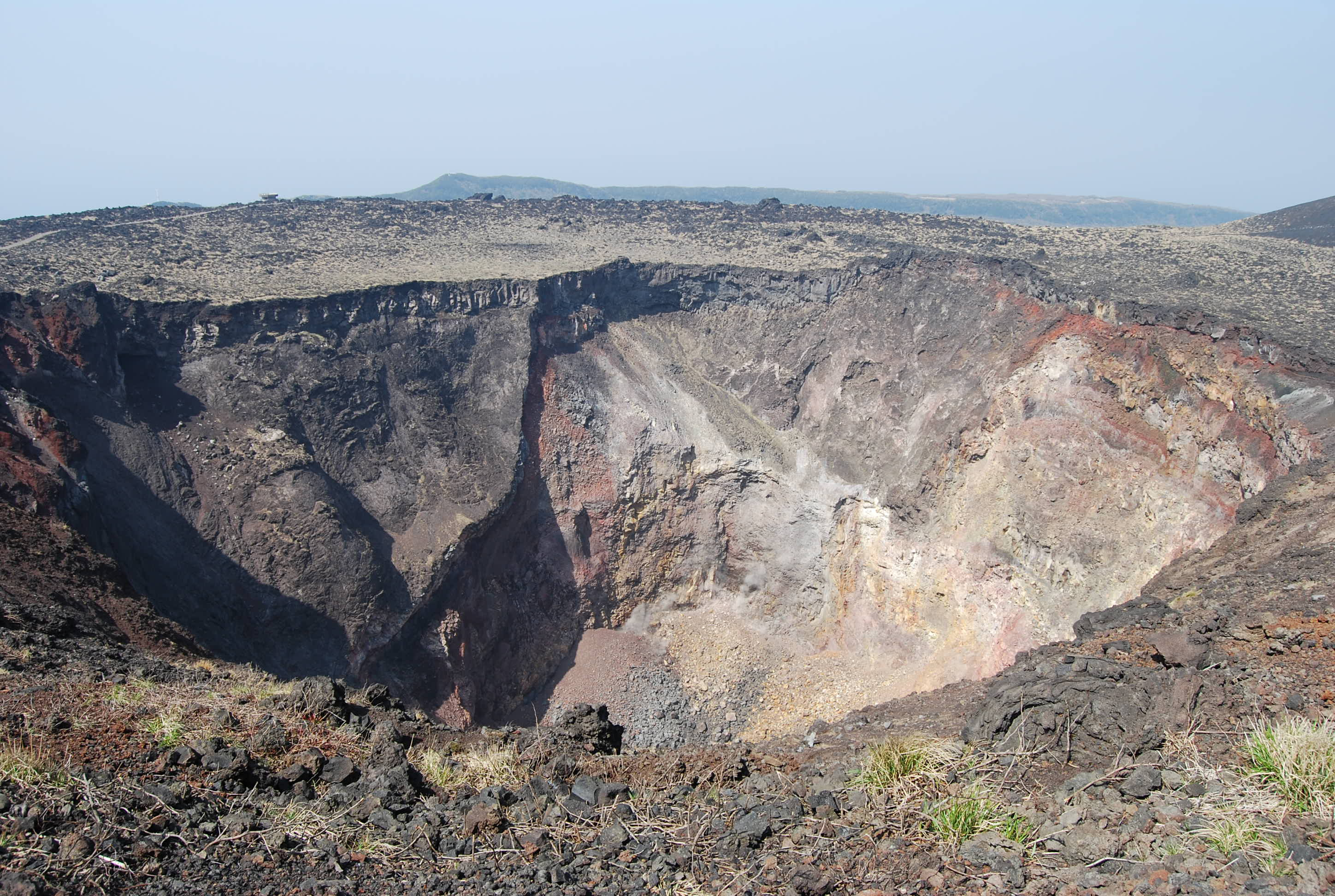
The crater of Mount Mihara was the last filming location.

The crew traveled back to Tokyo in October, preparing to film the last on-location scene at Izu Ōshima. Buck commented that the volcano had recently been active and had affected the area slightly. They were rushing to complete filming within the deadlines, but the pilot refused to fly to Ōshima on the initially planned day, and they ventured there by steamer instead, wary of potential typhoons. Two days were spent on the island for photography; guards standing on the edge of Mount Mihara's crater forbade them access due to its recent activity, but the crew managed to convince the guards to let them pass. Yamazaki, Danielewski, and assistants descended into the crater carefully for the footage. Five days after they finished filming and had returned to Tokyo, Mount Mihara erupted. Filming concluded circa late November. (Note: American publications first reported that it had ended in December. However, Buck stated in an editor's note for The Japan Times published on November 20, 1960, that she was returning to the U.S. and entrusting Danielewski to stay for post-production since filming had just finished.)

==== Special effects ====
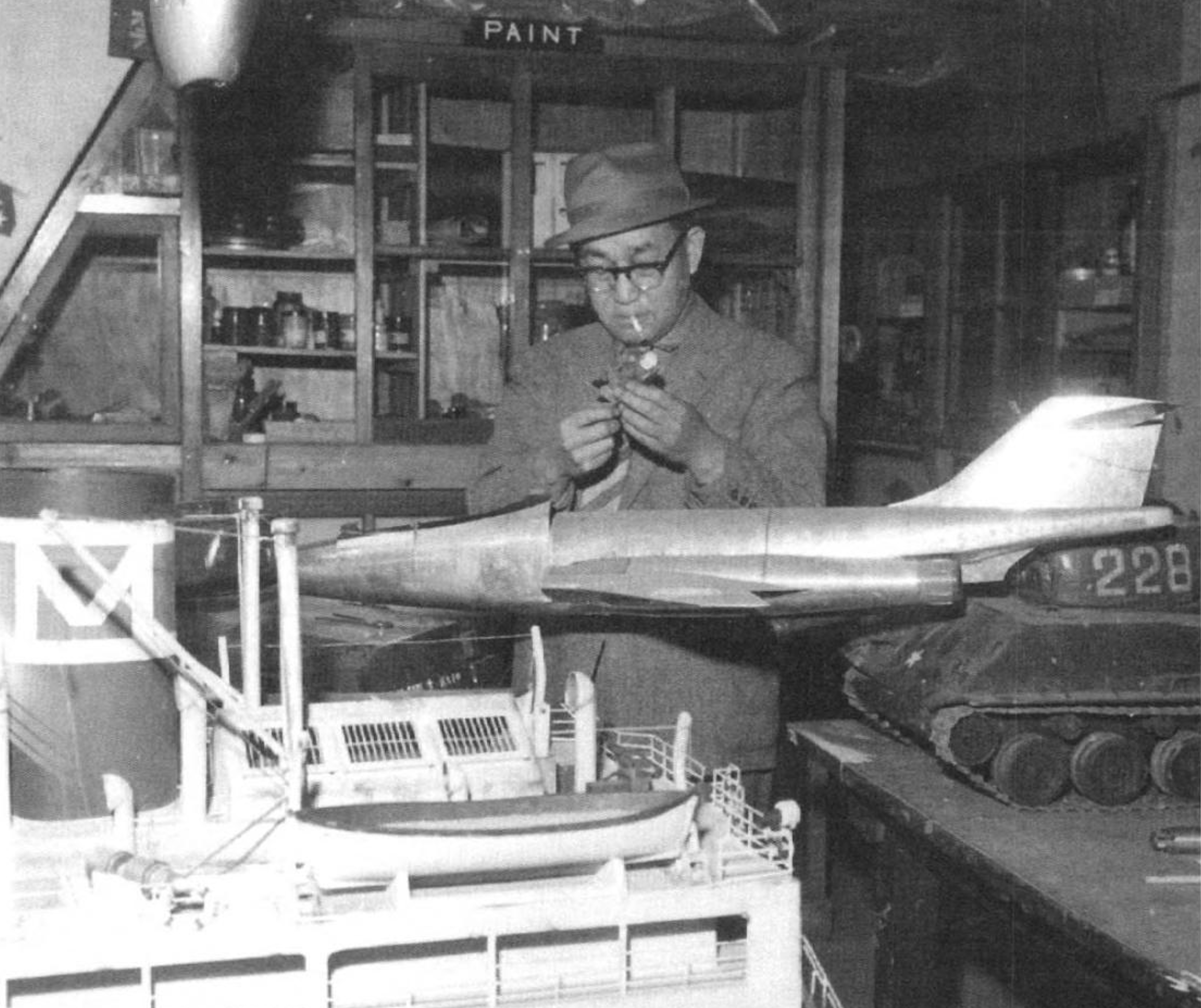
Eiji Tsuburaya (pictured in 1961) helmed the film's special effects.

The film's special effects were directed by Eiji Tsuburaya, (Note: The American Film Institute and Stuart Galbraith IV erroneously credit the special effects to "Kenji Inagawa".) with the help of Sadamasa Arikawa, Akira Watanabe, and Teruyoshi Nakano. While the crew was filming in Obama, Tsuburaya was staging the tsunami scene at Toho Studios in Tokyo. Buck stated that "twice he had come to Obama to consult and to take hundreds of pictures of Kitsu and the empty beach beyond. We knew that we were in safe hands, the tidal wave would be perfect, but we could not see it until we returned to the city. Ours was the task of creating the approach to the wave, and the recovery from it."

Tsuburaya's effects were the final section of the film to be completed. In A Bridge for Passing, Buck described the last day of filming: "In a space as vast as Madison Square Garden in New York, which is the biggest place I can think of at the moment, he [Tsuburaya] had reconstructed Kitsu, the mountains and the sea. The houses were three feet high, each in perfect miniature, and everything else was in proportion. A river ran outside the studio and the rushing water for the tidal wave would be released into the studio by great sluices along one side. I looked into the houses, I climbed the little mountain, I marveled at the exactitude of the beach, even to the rocks where in reality I had so often taken shelter. The set was not yet ready for the tidal wave. That I was to see later on the screen in all its power and terror."

=== Music ===
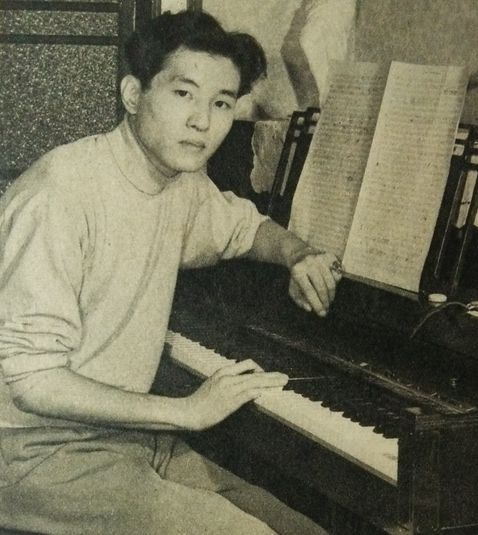
Toshiro Mayuzumi (pictured in 1952) wrote the score

Mayuzumi volunteered to write the score, after meeting Buck and gifting her a copy of his 1958 symphony titled Nirvana. He told Buck that he envisioned the score to sound "really romantic, not Wagnerian romantic, strong and delicate together, with contemporary Oriental philosophy." After writing the score, Mayuzumi was set to travel to New York and write music for the New York City Ballet Orchestra. Ultimately, Mayuzumi was allegedly not in Japan at the time of post-production, and the majority of the score was composed by Tōru Takemitsu and Riichirō Manabe, according to the latter. The score is, however, credited to Mayuzumi, with Hiroshi Yoshizawa conducting it.

At Mayuzumi's request, the soundtrack included a song titled "Be Ready at Dawn", which he intended to reflect its focus on youth and be "like the sunrise, young and fresh and full of hope". Mayuzumi composed it and wanted Buck to write the lyrics, but Buck declined. The song ultimately featured lyrics written by Danielewski, and was sung by Curtis.

=== Post-production ===
During post-production, a third of the film's audio was re-recorded under Danielewski's supervision. Editor Lester A. Sansom of Allied Artists was involved in post-production. Two edits of the film were created, with the original having a runtime of 98 minutes while the American version ran for 73 minutes. Toho's subsidiary Towa may have dubbed the film into Japanese as well, as reported on May 23, 1961.

== Release ==
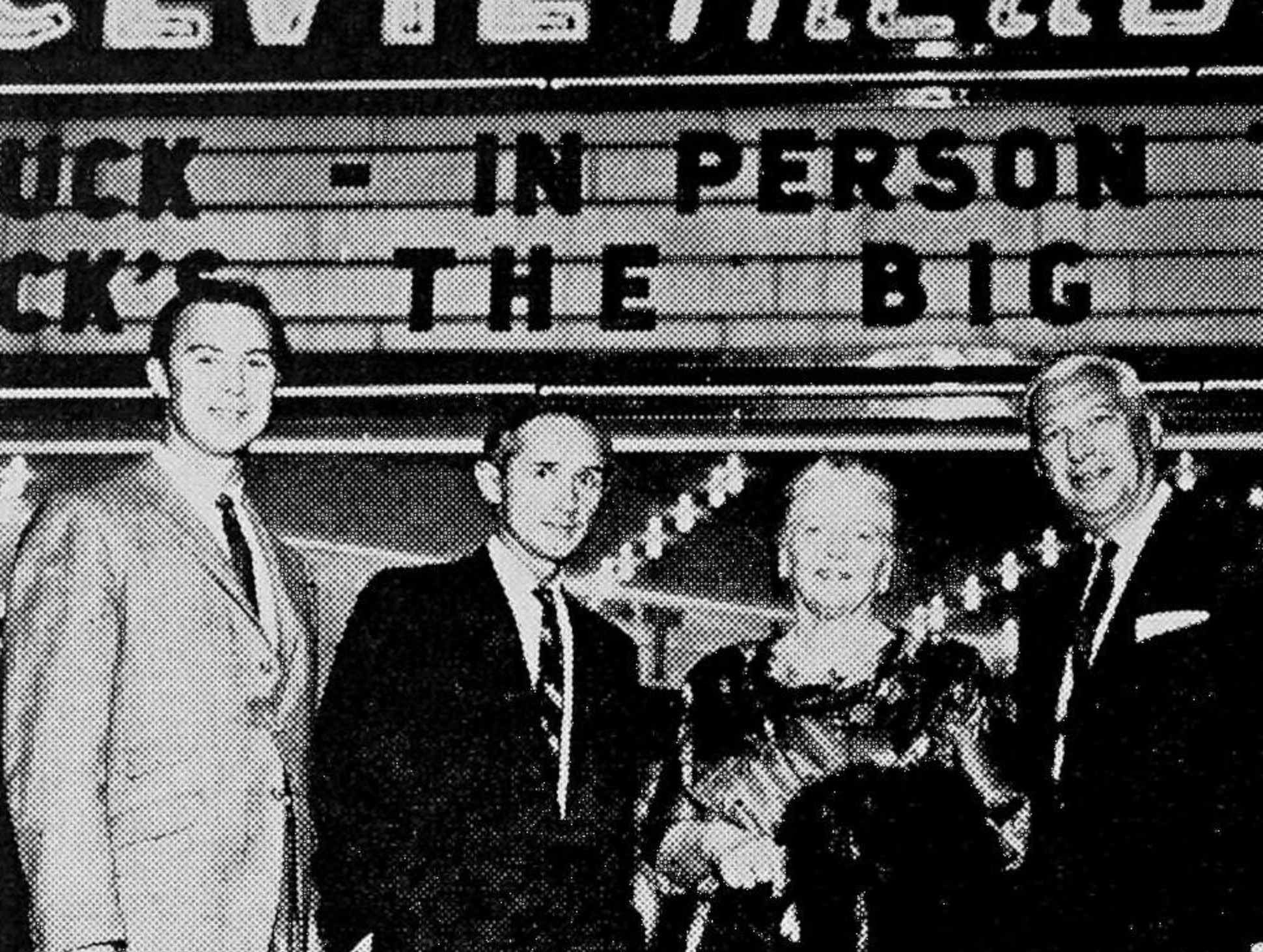
From left to right: Assistant producer John Anderson, Tad Danielewski, Pearl S. Buck, and theater owner Bernard Haines at the film's Pennsylvanian premiere

The Big Wave was previewed for Allied Artists executives in Hollywood, Los Angeles circa late December 1960, to positive reactions. Though the film was never released throughout Japan, it was shown at Hirosaki's National Theatre and Niigata's Toho Theater in 1961. Due to the absence of contemporary reports, the dissolution of Stratton Productions and Allied Artists, and Toho's lack of pertinent records, the precise screening dates in Japan and the film's box office total remain unknown. As late as 1970, Buck commented that Toho still owned a complete print of The Big Wave and hoped they would distribute it someday since she was disappointed that Allied Artists had not done so. At least three Western critics had reviewed the film by May 1961.

In the United States, the film opened to audiences with a roadshow theatrical release in April 1962. Contemporary sources list the official release date as April 29. Reynold Brown made the poster for its release. Allied Artists frequently showed it as the second feature in a double bill, pairing it with films like The Bridge, Rider on a Dead Horse, Convicts 4 (as Reprieve), and The Phantom of the Opera in 1962, and The Day of the Triffids and El Cid in 1963. Its Pennsylvanian state premiere took place at Bernard Haines' Selvil Theater in Sellersville on October 17, with Buck and Danielewski present. Buck's son Edgar Walsh, who served in the United States Army at the time, saw the film at Fort Dix in New Jersey. He recalled: "That was the first movie I ever saw the audience get up and leave". It was also shown at Mexico City's Cine Paris theater on February 12, 1963, under the title Tifón en Japón (transl. Typhoon in Japan). Nevertheless, Buck biographers Nora B. Stirling, Ann La Farge, and Warren Sherk claim that The Big Wave was never released; Stirling and Sherk asserted that no film distributor wanted to release the film, and its only reported screening was a private one for Buck's friends near her home in Bucks County, Pennsylvania.

According to Boxoffice, The Big Wave overperformed at the American box office, but an estimate could not be provided due to inconclusive reports. Variety reported that the film grossed roughly $15,000 at the Metropolitan Theatre in Boston during a week in May 1962, $7,500 at the Fox Theatre in Detroit during a week in July, $4,000 at the Lafayette Theatre in Buffalo during a week in August, and $8,000 at the Golden Gate Theatre in San Francisco during the first week of September.

From September 1963 to March 1977, it was occasionally shown on television in the United States. Sasa's husband, Osami Nabe, recounted a friend of his praising Sasa’s English proficiency after seeing the film on U.S. television in the 1970s, though Sasa believed her voice was likely dubbed for international audiences.

In recent years, the film has become largely unavailable to the general public, partly due to copyright intricacies preventing any repairs or releases from taking place in Japan. (Note: Its copyright was renewed in 1989 by the now-defunct Lorimar-Telepictures. The current copyright holder of the film is not publicly disclosed. Researcher Michihiro Amano states that Toho does not own the rights, and while Warner Bros. was previously considered a possible holder, Paramount Pictures may also be the copyright owner.) In 2004, a group of residents from Minamitakaki District, Nagasaki began negotiating with the film's American copyright holder to screen it as part of a celebration for the October 2005 merger of seven towns in the region (including two of its filming locations) into Unzen city. It was ultimately screened at Unzen Memorial Hall on October 29, 2005, with Ongg in attendance. The print shown there was owned by the Kawakita Memorial Film Institute, but has since been discarded due to deterioration. As of 2018, the National Museum of Modern Art, Tokyo also held a print, but it was in poor condition and therefore could not be projected. Thus, the Moving Image Section of the Library of Congress owns the only known remaining watchable print of the film, which they have preserved and can be viewed only within the library.

== Reception ==
In the May 1961 issue of Consumer Bulletin, one critic gave the film a "B" rating (suggesting they did not directly recommend or condemned the film) while another two rated it "C" (indicating the reviewers did not recommend it). The following year, positive reviews from critics were reported. Stratton Productions claimed The Big Wave and Danielewski's succeeding film No Exit (1962) received "international acclaim", providing a single review of the former and five reviews of the latter as proof.

Critics consistently praised the acting and casting choices. A Motion Picture Exhibitor reviewer highlighted Hayakawa’s standout performance, whereas they viewed the cast as all-else complete unknown in the Western world. Boxoffice commended the all-Japanese cast's delivery of English dialogue, specifically singling out Hayakawa and Curtis. Michael S. Willis of the San Francisco Chronicle remarked that on-location shooting with the use of an all-Japanese cast "create a feeling of uncontrived reality", though he found the Japanese accents occasionally distracting. In a retrospective review, author Thomas S. Hischak similarly felt the performances were decent, contributing to the film’s authentic atmosphere.

The production values garnered recognition. Willis lauded cinematographer Yamazaki’s work, underscoring the authentic portrayal of elderly villagers. The cinematography and special effects were also accentuated by the French-language publication Mediafilm. The Motion Picture Exhibitor regarded the tidal wave scene as a decent showcase of the Japanese film industry's skill in creating realistic miniature sets. They also hailed the shark hunt sequence and the editing, noting that substantial cuts for the U.S. release impacted the final product.

Reviewers offered varied perspectives on The Big Wave's market potential and overall impact. The Motion Picture Exhibitor critic thought the film was captivating but saw the story as only appealing to art house audiences due to its niche qualities and leisurely pacing. In contrast, Boxoffice suggested it had broader potential, capable of succeeding in both art house and mainstream markets, due to its compelling story and Buck’s reputation. Willis described it as "not a masterpiece, but it achieves quite admirably what it sets out to do", considering it a "fine, gentle counterpoint" to The Phantom of the Opera, its double-feature counterpart. Mediafilm highlighted it as a "work full of sensitivity and human tenderness". Reviewing the 60-minute televised version, Steven H. Scheuer, Leonard Maltin, and Blockbuster Entertainment noted its slow pacing; while Scheuer praised the acting. Blockbuster Entertainment described the film as "Leisurely paced and quite interesting, really". Hischak echoed these sentiments by calling its overall narrative restrained, engaging viewers more intellectually than emotionally.

== Legacy ==
The Big Wave is considered culturally and historically significant, but how widespread its social impact was at the time remains unknown. It became a pioneering cinematic co-production between the United States and Japan; Buck claimed it was notable as the first film with an American production company working entirely in Japan with a major Japanese company and a partially Japanese crew. Two other U.S.-Japan co-productions also featuring Tetsu Nakamura among the cast were, however, produced in the 1950s: Tokyo File 212 (1951) and The Manster (1959), predated the film. Following The Big Wave was Frank Sinatra's None but the Brave (1965), also co-produced by Toho and featuring special effects by Tsuburaya. The film is also regarded as an early disaster film as well as an early example of how natural disasters in Japan are perceived abroad.

Since its release, the film has gradually faded into obscurity. In November 2022, The New York Times Book Review asked readers to identify which of Buck's books had received both a film and a television adaptation. Only 24% of over 7,000 participants correctly answered The Big Wave.
