= A Bridge for Passing =

1962 memoir by Pearl S. Buck

- First edition cover
- Author: Pearl S. Buck
- Genre: Memoir
- Publisher: John Day Company
- Publication date: April 2, 1962
- Publication place: United States
- Media type: Print (hardcover, paperback)
- Pages: 256

A Bridge for Passing is a memoir by American writer Pearl S. Buck, published in April 1962 by the John Day Company. It chronicles her experiences in Japan in 1960, where she worked on a film adaptation of her 1948 book The Big Wave while coping with the grief of losing her husband, Richard J. Walsh.

== Background and contents ==
In 1960, Buck visited Japan for the first time in 25 years, to prepare a film adaptation of her 1948 book The Big Wave. During this period, her husband and publisher, Richard J. Walsh, died in the United States. Buck wrote letters while working on the film that executives from Allied Artists (the film's American financier) encouraged her to compile into a book, leading to the creation of A Bridge for Passing.

Set against the backdrop of postwar Japan, the book reflects both personal loss and the cultural milieu of the time (including the Westernization of Japanese women's customs). The book's title is a reference to the death of her husband and Buck's goal of building a "bridge between the west and east".

Names of individuals are rarely mentioned in the book, and Buck often states their ethnicity and occupation instead. She notably refers to Walsh as "he" within the book.

== Publication and reception ==
A Bridge for Passing received widespread acclaim. It was first published in the December 1961 issue of McCall's. The Chicago Tribune and Kirkus Reviews published reviews on April 1, 1962, collectively praising its poignant autobiographical narrative and insights on grief and Japanese culture. A Bridge for Passing was officially published as a book the following day, by the John Day Company. Coincidentally, later that same month, The Big Wave opened in selected American theaters.
