= Danielewski =

Danielewski (feminine: Danielewska; plural: Danielewscy) is a Polish-language surname derived from the given name Daniel. Notable people with this surname include:

- Poe (singer), born Annie Danielewski (born 1968), American musician
- Mark Z. Danielewski (born 1966), American fiction author
- Łucja Danielewska (1932–2004), Polish writer and translator
- Tad Danielewski (1921–1993), American film director
