= Good Morning (1959 film) =

1959 film by Yasujiro Ozu

- Film poster

Japanese name
- Kanji: お早よう
- Literal meaning: Good Morning
Transcriptions
- Revised Hepburn: Ohayō
- Directed by: Yasujirō Ozu
- Written by: Kōgo Noda; Yasujirō Ozu
- Produced by: Shizuo Yamanouchi
- Starring: Keiji Sada; Yoshiko Kuga; Chishū Ryū; Kuniko Miyake
- Cinematography: Yūharu Atsuta
- Music by: Toshirō Mayuzumi
- Distributed by: Shōchiku Films Ltd.
- Release date: May 12, 1959
- Running time: 94 minutes
- Country: Japan
- Language: Japanese

Good Morning (お早よう, Ohayō) is a 1959 Japanese comedy film co-written and directed by Yasujirō Ozu. It is a loose remake of his own 1932 silent film I Was Born, But..., and is Ozu's second film in color.

== Plot ==
In a suburban neighborhood of Tokyo, schoolboy Minoru Hayashi and his little brother Isamu head home with their friends, who demonstrate their cherished ability to fart at will.

At home, the local women become concerned after learning that the monthly dues for the neighborhood women's organization are missing. Everyone in the neighborhood club believes that Minoru and Isamu's mother Mrs. Hayashi, the treasurer, has given the dues to the chairwoman, Mrs. Haraguchi, but Mrs. Haraguchi denies receiving them. Gossip runs rampant, and they speculate that Mrs. Haraguchi could have taken the money and used it to buy the new washing machine the Haraguchi family has recently acquired. Mrs. Haraguchi confronts Mrs. Hayashi for starting the rumor and ruining her reputation, but Mrs. Hayashi insists that she turned over the money to Mrs. Haraguchi's mother. Only later does Mrs. Haraguchi realize it was her mistake, as her mother, growing forgetful in her old age, had received the money from Mrs. Hayashi, then forgotten about it being quite senile and forgetful, and she goes to apologize to Mrs. Hayashi.

The boys are all attracted to a neighbor's house because they have a television set, where they can watch televised sumo wrestling matches, which were rapidly gaining popularily in Japan in the 1950s. However, their conservative parents forbid them to visit the bohemian neighbors, as they disapprove of the family's laid-back lifestyle and are jealous of the wife, who is thought to be a cabaret singer.

Minoru and Isamu try to pressure their mother to buy them a TV set of their own, but she refuses. They have a tantrum, and their father admonishes them to be quiet. Angered, Minoru responds with disdain for the way adults always engage in pointless niceties like making empty chit-chat like "good morning" and refuse to say exactly what they mean. Back in their room, Minoru and Isamu decide they will keep completely quiet and refuse to talk to any adults until they get a TV. The first neighbor to bear the brunt of this snub is Mrs. Haraguchi. Angered, she assumes that Mrs. Hayashi is upset with her over the missing dues incident, and gossips about her with busybody Mrs. Tomizawa. Soon, the other housewives come to believe Mrs. Haraguchi's stories that Mrs. Hayashi is petty and vindictive, and they all pointedly come to visit and return items that she loaned to them.

Minoru and Isamu maintain their silence at school, and even with their English tutor. Finally, their schoolteacher visits to find the root of their silence. No longer being served dinner at home, the hungry boys run away to the riverbank with the rice basin and teapot. They run away from a passing policeman, who picks up the discarded basin and kettle. They disappear for hours into the evening, until their English tutor joins in the search in hopes of finding favor with the boys' unmarried aunt, for whom he has romantic feelings, and finds them by the train station watching television in a display window.

When they return home, Minoru and Isamu are overjoyed to see a new TV set, which their parents purchased to support a neighbour in his new job as a salesman. Jubilant, they end their silence at once. Their English tutor and their aunt show signs of mutual attraction, but in a chance meeting at the train station, they continue to talk only about the weather, lacking the courage to admit their true feelings.

== Cast ==
- Keiji Sada as Heiichiro Fukui
- Yoshiko Kuga as Setsuko Arita
- Chishū Ryū as Keitaro Hayashi
- Kuniko Miyake as Tamiko Hayashi
- Haruko Sugimura as Kikue Haraguchi
- Koji Shitara as Minoru Hayashi
- Masahiko Shimazu as Isamu Hayashi
- Kyoko Izumi as Midori Maruyama
- Taiji Tonoyama as the door-to-door salesman
- Tsûsai Sugawara as bar patron

== Style ==
Despite Ozu's reputation in the West as an austere and refined director, Good Morning does not shy away from depicting flatulence and incontinence jokes.

== Reception ==
Good Morning has an 94% approval rating on Rotten Tomatoes. Richard Brody of The New Yorker wrote about the film "Yasujiro Ozu’s poised images convey a bitterly ironic, scathingly radical rejection of Japanese codes of self-restraint and silence." Jonathan Rosenbaum of Chicago Reader praised the film describing it as "Perhaps the most delightful of Yasujiro Ozu's late comedies". Leonard Maltin gave it three of four stars: "Brightly hued remake of Ozu's own equally sharp I Was Born, But... updates the material but retains his wry take on the Westernization of Japanese society." In 2009 the film was ranked at No. 36 on the list of the Greatest Japanese Films of All Time by Japanese film magazine Kinema Junpo.

=== Home media ===
In 2011, the BFI released a Region 2 Dual Format Edition (Blu-ray + DVD). Included with this release is a standard definition presentation of I Was Born, But....

In 2017, Criterion re-released Good Morning in a Region 1 Blu-ray. The film received a 4k digital restoration for this release and is packaged alongside I Was Born, But... and a fragment of A Straightforward Boy.
