= The Big Wave =

1948 novel by Pearl S. Buck

- First edition
- Author: Pearl S. Buck
- Illustrator: Hiroshige and Hokusai
- Language: English
- Genre: Children's novel
- Set in: Japan
- Publisher: John Day Company
- Publication date: March 21, 1948
- Publication place: United States

The Big Wave is a children's novel by Pearl S. Buck. It was first published as a short story in the October 1947 issue of the magazine Jack and Jill with illustrations from Ann Eshner Jaffe. Buck expanded the story and published it in book form in March 1948 through John Day Company, with illustrations from Utagawa Hiroshige and Katsushika Hokusai. She won the 1948 Child Study Association's Children's Book Award (now the Josette Frank Award) for The Big Wave.

Buck later adapted the story into an episode of The Alcoa Hour (1956) and a 1961 film co-written with director Tad Danielewski.

== Plot ==
Kino lives with his family on a farm on the side of a mountain in Japan while his friend, Jiya, lives in the fishing village below. Though everyone in the area has heard of the big wave no one suspects that when the next one comes, it will wipe out Jiya's entire family and fishing village below the mountain. Jiya soon must leave his family behind in order to keep the fisherman traditions alive.

Jiya, now orphaned, struggles to overcome his sadness and is adopted into Kino's family. He and Kino live like brothers and Jiya takes on the life of a farmer. Even when the wise Old Gentleman offers Jiya a wealthy life at his rich castle, Jiya refuses. Though Jiya is able to find happiness again in his adopted family, particularly with Kino's younger sister, Setsu, Jiya wishes to live as a fisherman again as he comes of age.

When Jiya tells Kino that he wishes to marry Setsu and return to the fishing village, Kino fears that Jiya and Setsu will suffer and it is safer for them to remain on the mountain as a farmer, thinking of the potential consequences should another big wave come. However, Jiya reveals his understanding that it is in the presence of danger that one learns to be brave, and to appreciate how wonderful life can be.

== Adaptations ==
Pearl S. Buck worked with Tad Danielewski to develop the script for television (1956), and the show played successfully to critics. Buck also worked closely on the film version, The Big Wave (1961) which Danielewski directed. The film starred Sessue Hayakawa, Mickey Curtis, and Juzo Itami. Singer Judy Ongg also appeared in the film.
