= Stratton Mountain =

Stratton Mountain can refer to

- Stratton Mountain (Massachusetts)
- Stratton Mountain (Vermont), a 3,940-ft mountain in Stratton, Vermont
- Stratton Mountain Resort, a ski resort on Stratton Mountain, Vermont
