= Rita Gam =

American actress (1927–2016)

- Gam in 1969
- Born: Rita Eleanore MacKay; April 2, 1927; Pittsburgh, Pennsylvania, U.S.
- Died: March 22, 2016 (aged 88); Los Angeles, California, U.S.
- Occupation: Actress
- Years active: 1950–1997
- Spouses: Sidney Lumet (m. 1949; div. 1954) Thomas Guinzburg (m. 1956; div. 1963)
- Children: 2

Rita Gam (born Rita Eleanore MacKay; April 2, 1927 – March 22, 2016) was an American film and television actress and documentary filmmaker. She won the Silver Bear for Best Actress.

== Background ==
Gam was born in Pittsburgh, Pennsylvania, the daughter of Belle (née Fately), who was born in Romania, and Milton A. MacKay, who was born in France to parents from Romania. Her father died in New York in 1931 and her mother remarried. Gam took the surname of her stepfather, Benjamin J. Gam.

== Career ==
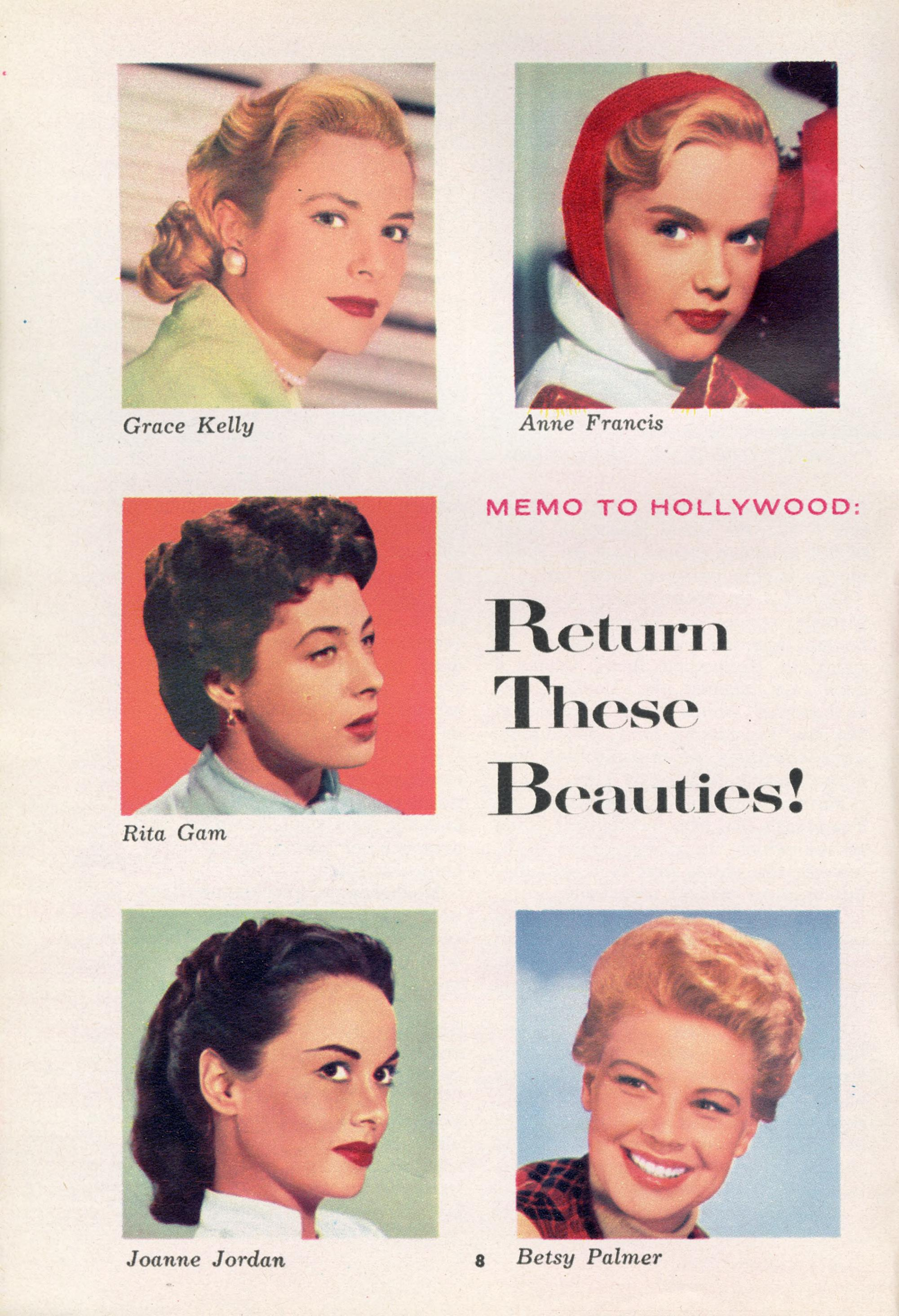
Gam (middle row, left) in TV Guide, October 30, 1954

Gam was a model before she ventured into acting. Her acting career began on Broadway and in television, after which she moved on to films. Her Broadway credits included There's a Girl in My Soup, The Insect Comedy, A Flag is Born, and A Temporary Island.

She appeared first in the 1952 film noir The Thief, which starred Ray Milland. In October 1952, she signed a long-term MGM contract. Another notable role was Herodias in 1961's King of Kings.

Gam was also an occasional panelist on the televised CBS game show What's My Line? during the 1950s and early 1960s.

She shared the Silver Bear for Best Actress award with Viveca Lindfors at the 1962 Berlin Film Festival, for their performances in Tad Danielewski's No Exit.

In 1963, Gam was a leading member of the Minnesota Theatre Company in the opening season of the Tyrone Guthrie Theater in Minneapolis. Gam appeared in a few more American films before working in Europe. She returned to the U.S. to appear in small parts in films, including Klute in 1971, before taking up documentary filmmaking.

In 2003, she appeared in the rotating cast of the off-Broadway stage reading of Wit & Wisdom. In 2004, she appeared in one of a series of ads for the Royal Bank of Scotland.

== Personal life and death ==
Gam's first husband was director Sidney Lumet, whom she married in 1949. The marriage ended in divorce in 1955.

In 1956, Gam was a bridesmaid at the wedding of Grace Kelly to Prince Rainier in Monaco. Gam married publisher Thomas Guinzburg on March 23, 1956, in New York City; the marriage ended in divorce in 1963.

Gam died on March 22, 2016, at Cedars-Sinai Medical Center in Los Angeles, California, from respiratory failure.

== Books ==
Gam was the author of two books, Actress to Actress and Actors: A Celebration.

== Filmography ==
=== Film ===
Year	Title	Role	Notes
1952	The Thief	The Girl	No dialog; MacGuffin
1953	Saadia	Saadia	
1954	Night People	Ricky Cates	
1954	Sign of the Pagan	Kubra	
1956	Magic Fire	Cosima Liszt	
1956	Mohawk	Onida	
1958	Sierra Baron	Felicia Delmonte	
1959	Wild Cats on the Beach	Rita Eldmont	
1959	Hannibal	Sylvia	
1961	King of Kings	Herodias	
1962	No Exit	Estelle	Also known as Sinners Go to Hell
1971	Klute	Trina	
1971	Shoot Out	Emma	
1971	Such Good Friends	Doria	
1974	The Gardener	Helena Boardman	
1974	Law and Disorder	Woman in Cab	
1987	Distortions	Mildred Tyson	
1989	Midnight	Heidi	
1996	Rowing Through	Iris Biglow	
1997	Monaco		Short, Voice, (final film role)

=== Television ===
Year	Title	Role	Notes
1950	Believe It or Not!		"The Secret of Nefertiti"
1951	Lights Out	Girl	"The Pattern"
1951	Trapped		"The Nobody"
1951	Somerset Maugham TV Theatre		"Appearances and Reality"
1951	Danger		"Marley's Ghost", "Inherit Murder"
1951	Lux Video Theatre	Leah	"A Child Is Born"
1952	Cameo Theatre		"Dark of the Moon"
1952	Casey, Crime Photographer		"Blackmail"
1952	The Adventures of Fu Manchu: The Zayat Kiss		TV film
1954	The Motorola Television Hour	Anna	"Nightmare in Algiers"
1954	The Jack Benny Program	Woman in Commercial	"The Jam Session Show", "San Diego Naval Training Center Show"
1955	Ford Theatre	Mimi	"Mimi"
1955	Kraft Television Theatre		"Trucks Welcome"
1956	Front Row Center	Anna Deasy	"Deadlock"
1956	Screen Directors Playhouse	Lotti	"Affair in Sumatra"
1956	Westinghouse Studio One	Rain	"The Laughter of Giants"
1957	The Steve Allen Show	Comedian	"3.11"
1958	DuPont Show of the Month		"The Bridge of San Luis Rey"
1958	Armchair Theatre	Elsie	"Time of Your Life"
1960	The United States Steel Hour	Polly Chalmers	"The Women of Hadley", "Revolt in Hadley"
1964	Festival	Yelena	"Uncle Vanya"
1964	Voyage to the Bottom of the Sea	Detta	"The Mist of Silence"
1966	The Jackie Gleason Show	Rosita	"The Honeymooners: You're in the Picture"
1966	Family Affair	Louise Marshall	"Beware the Other Woman"
1968	Hidden Faces	Mimi Jaffe	TV series
1973	McMillan & Wife	Pam Crane	"The Devil You Say"
1974	Mannix	Dr. Ernestine Waldo	"Race Against Time: Parts 1 & 2"
1975	Matt Helm		"Now I Lay Me Down to Die"
1976	Harry O	Naomi Cline	"Book of Changes"
1977	Love of Life	Nita Ray	TV series
1978	Greatest Heroes of the Bible	Xantha	"The Story of Noah: Parts 1 & 2"
1979	The Rockford Files	Cynthia Zakarian	"Guilt"
1981	Tales of the Unexpected	Lisa Brisson	"Completely Foolproof"
1983	Romance Theatre	Mitzi	"Love in the Present Tense: Parts 1-5"
1983	Tucker's Witch	Beatrice	"Formula for Revenge"
1983	The Edge of Night	Dora Coburn	TV series
