= Anauta Blackmore =

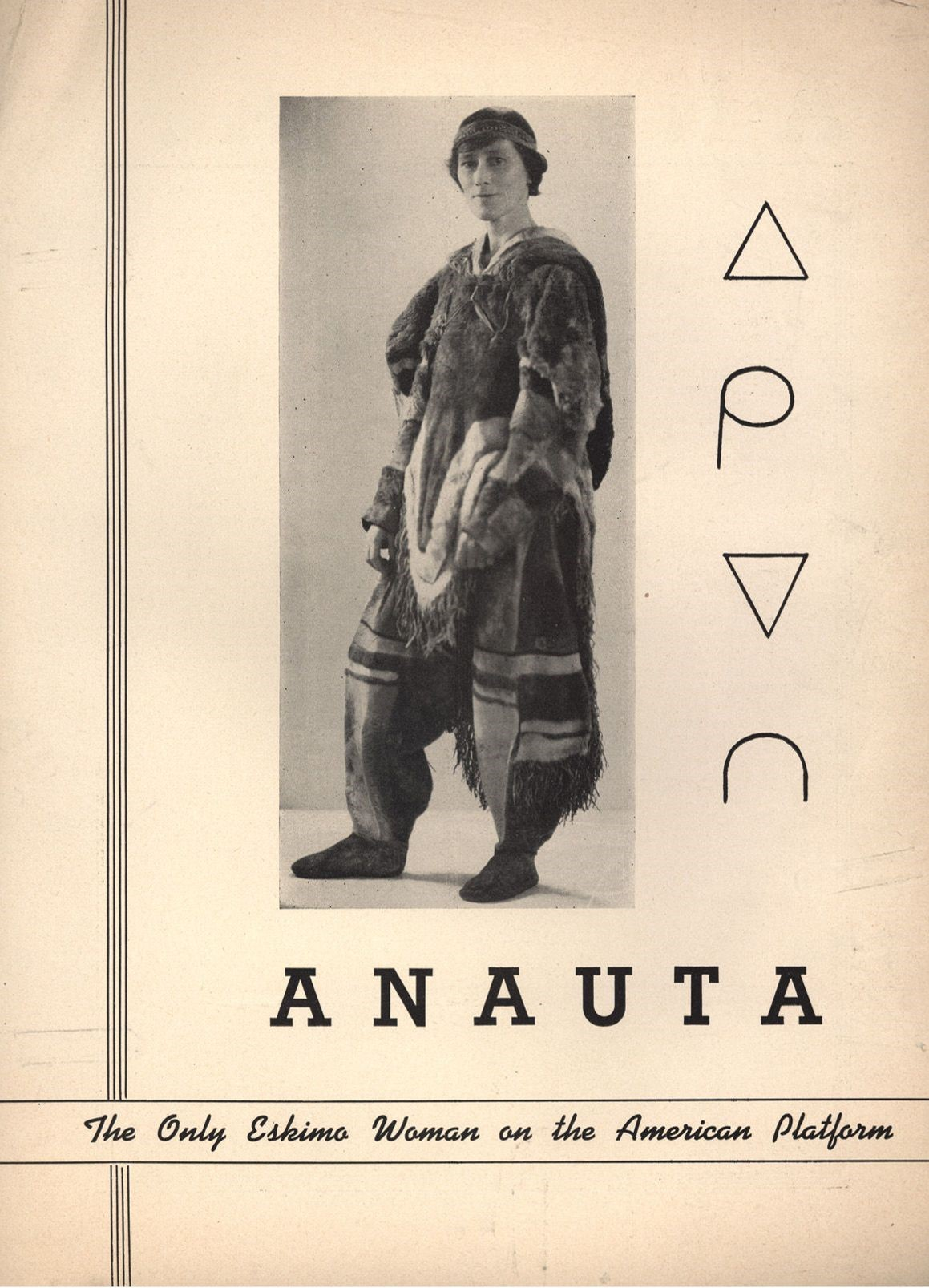
- 1940s flyer advertising Blackmore's lectures
- Born: Sarah Elizabeth Ford c. 1890; Baffin Island
- Died: January 13, 1965; Ashland, Kansas
- Other name: Lizzie Ford Blackmore
- Occupations: author and lecturer
- Years active: 1929–1965
- Notable work: Land of the Good Shadows

Anauta Blackmore (c. 1890–1965), also known as Lizzie Ford Blackmore, was an Arctic author, memoirist and lecturer. She is best known for her 1940 autobiography, Land of the Good Shadows, which may be the first book-length autobiography of an Inuk. Blackmore claimed to have Inuit ancestry, although it's unclear if this was true.

== Early life ==
She was born Sarah Elizabeth Ford on Baffin Island in about 1890. Her father was George (or Yorgke) Ford, who worked for the Hudson's Bay Company as an interpreter. In Blackmore's recounting, her mother was an Inuk woman, although company archives suggest her mother was from Newfoundland and died around 1905.

She married her cousin, trading-post manager William R. Ford, with whom she had two daughters, but was widowed in August 1913 when Ford drowned. After this she spent some time in Halifax, Nova Scotia, Montreal, Quebec, and Detroit, Michigan, before settling in Indianapolis, Indiana, around 1920. Here she married construction contractor Harry Blackmore.

== Career in America ==
In Indianapolis, she met Indianapolis Star cartoonist Chic Jackson who, around 1929, helped her establish herself on the lecture circuit. She embraced her Inuit name, Anauta, was advertised as "the only Eskimo woman on the American platform", and spoke about her life experience in the eastern Arctic.

In 1940, Blackmore collaborated with American children's writer Heluiz Chandler Washburne to write an autobiography, Land of the Good Shadows: The Life Story of Anauta, an Eskimo Woman, published by John Day Company. The story was certainly embellished for a white audience, with Blackmore claiming to have been adopted and raised by an Inuk woman. She would go on to write two more books, Children of the Blizzard (1952), a collection of stories of Inuit children, and Wild Like the Foxes: The True Story of an Eskimo Girl (1956), a biography of her mother.

Blackmore died of a heart attack on 13 January 1965 in Ashland, Kansas, where she had been engaged to lecture.
