= Harold Rugg =

American educational reformer

Harold Ordway Rugg (1886–1960) was an educational reformer in the early to mid 1900s, associated with the Progressive education movement. Originally trained in civil engineering at Dartmouth College (BS 1908 & CE 1909), Rugg went on to study psychology, sociology and education at the University of Illinois where he completed a doctoral dissertation titled "The Experimental Determination of Mental Discipline in School Studies."

After earning his PhD he went on to teach at the University of Chicago and later became a professor at Teachers College at Columbia University for three decades. He studied creativity which he believed was vital to the learning process. He created the first textbook series and his social studies books were extremely popular in US schools. By the early forties his books fell out of favor due to campaigns run by organizations like the Advertising Federation of America and the American Legion, due to Rugg's junior-high textbooks including concepts considered "pro-socialist" by conservative opponents.

== Biography ==
Rugg was born on January 17, 1886, in Fitchburg, Massachusetts. He attended Dartmouth College, where he received his Bachelor of Science in civil engineering in 1908 and his graduate degree in civil engineering in 1909. Rugg worked as a civil engineer before becoming a professor at Millikin University in Decatur, Illinois, where he taught for two years and became interested in how students learn.

Rugg began teaching at the University of Illinois in 1911 and in 1915, Rugg submitted his dissertation, "The Experimental Determination of Mental Discipline in School Studies" in order to attain his PhD in education. During World War I, Rugg served as a member of the Army's Commission on Classification of Personnel under Charles H Judd. The commission is credited with testing adults for aptitudes and intelligence. Rugg used his wartime experience in educational statistics to study children's education. He taught at the University of Chicago from 1915 until January 1920, where he pioneered the application of quantitative methods to educational problems. In 1917, he published Statistical Methods Applied to Education and in 1928 published The Child-Centered School, which was an early influence on the progressive education movement.

In 1920, Rugg took a job at the Teachers College of Columbia University, where he stayed until he retired in 1951. While he was teaching at Columbia, Rugg became a spokesperson for the reconstructionist perspective, which viewed formal education as an agent of social change. His views spread widely, and Rugg has been credited with consolidating social sciences and creating a curriculum for the consolidated subject. In 1922, he was elected as a fellow of the American Statistical Association.

He created the first series of an educational book, Man and His Changing Society, which was a junior high school social studies textbook that ran 14 volumes from 1929 until the early 1940s. Man and His Changing Society was later scrutinized by the Advertising Federation of America and the American Legion for "pro-socialist ideas" because he illustrated the American society as having strengths and weaknesses. The Advertising Federation of America, or AFA, and the American Legion felt that these topics undermined the stability of American society. Many school districts pulled the textbook series subsequently starting censorship of his textbook. Rugg published Culture and Education in America in 1931, The Great Technology in 1933, and American Life and the School Curriculum in 1936. Each of these books discussed problems in American society and how education could solve them.

In addition to emphasizing the social engineering philosophies of the reconstructionists, Rugg argued that individual integrity was vital to a good society and could be fostered by creative self-expression. Therefore, he championed the expansion of creative activities within school curriculum and would continue to research creativity after his retirement from Columbia in 1951. Rugg died at his home on May 17, 1960, in Woodstock, New York. His final book, titled Imagination was published posthumously in 1963.

== Education ==
- 1908 - BS, Dartmouth College
- 1909 - MS, Dartmouth College
- 1915 - PhD, University of Illinois, Education

== Professional employment ==
- 1909-1910 - Missouri Pacific Railroad – Civil Engineer
- 1910-1911 - James Millikin University – Professor
- 1914-1915 - U.S. Army – Researcher
- 1915-1920 - University of Chicago – Instructor
- 1920-1951 - Teachers College, Columbia University - Professor

== Bibliography ==
- 1915 - The Experimental Determination of Mental Discipline in School Studies
- 1917 - Statistical Methods Applied to Education
- 1928 - The Child-Centered School
- 1929 - Man and His Changing Society
- 1930 - A History of American Civilization Economic and Social
- 1931 - Culture and Education in America
- 1933 - The Great Technology
- 1933 - Study Guide to National Recovery: An Introduction to Economic Problems, John Day – with Marvin Krueger
- 1936 - American Life and the School Curriculum
- 1947 - Foundations for American Education
- 1963 - Imagination
