= Thomas Guinzburg =

American editor and publisher (1926–2010)

- Born: Thomas Henry Guinzburg; March 30, 1926; New York City, New York, U.S.
- Died: September 8, 2010 (aged 84); New York City, New York, U.S.
- Occupations: Editor and publisher
- Spouses: Rita Gam (m. 1956–1963) Rusty Unger (divorced)
- Children: 3

Thomas Henry Guinzburg (March 30, 1926 – September 8, 2010) was an American editor and publisher who served as the first managing editor of The Paris Review following its inception in 1953 and later succeeded his father as president of the Viking Press.

== Life and career ==
Guinzburg was born on March 30, 1926, to a Jewish family in Manhattan. His father, Harold K. Guinzburg, the publisher and co-founder of Viking Press, gave him a manuscript copy of The Story of Ferdinand when he was nine years old. Guinzburg enjoyed the book so much that it convinced his father to publish it and ended up selling four million copies, giving the young Guinzburg his first inkling that he might have a career in the publishing business. He attended the Hotchkiss School and volunteered to serve in the United States Marine Corps during World War II. He was deployed for more than two years and received the Purple Heart for his brave action on Iwo Jima.

After completing his military service, he attended Yale University, where he was a member of Skull and Bones as well as the managing editor of the Yale Daily News at the same time that William F. Buckley, Jr. was editor. Buckley and Guinzburg were close friends for several years, and Guinzburg briefly dated his sister, Jane. However, Buckley’s father disapproved of the relationship, telling him "We don’t want a Jew in the family." After Buckley told Guinzburg to cut the relationship off, the two drifted apart. Buckley biographer Sam Tanenhaus asked Buckley how he reacted to his father's demand that Guinzberg separate from his sister; Buckley stated it was "sheerly a matter of logic and rationality" to not have a Jew in the family.

Following his graduation from Yale, Guinzburg joined several contemporaries in Paris, including Donald Hall, Peter Matthiessen, George Plimpton and William Styron. In 1953, he co-founded, with Matthiessen, Plimpton, and Harold L. Humes, an English-language literary magazine called The Paris Review. It declared itself for "the good writers and good poets, the non-drumbeaters and non-axe grinders/so long as they're good."

Guinzburg was chosen by his friends as the first managing editor of The Paris Review because he was the only one with any prior publishing experience. Behind his efforts, the magazine quickly developed a reputation for in-depth interviews with authors such as Ernest Hemingway, Ian McEwan, and Seamus Heaney about their craft. The journal also helped to launch the careers of luminaries like T. Coraghessan Boyle, Jack Kerouac, V. S. Naipaul, Adrienne Rich, Philip Roth and Mona Simpson. Editor Robert B. Silvers of The New York Review of Books said Guinzburg was a "marvelous combination of idealist and realist. He was always encouraging The Review not to be deterred from discovering young writers of quality" while maintaining "a grasp of the really rough details of commercial publishing."

He began working in the publicity department of the Viking Press in 1954 and assumed the position of president upon his father's early death in 1961 from lung cancer. Viking was purchased by Penguin Books in 1975 for a price estimated at $12 million. Jacqueline Kennedy Onassis, whom he hired in 1975, joined other notable editors he brought to Viking, including Aaron Asher, Elisabeth Sifton and Corlies Smith. Onassis left the firm in 1977 after Viking published the Jeffrey Archer book Shall We Tell the President?, a fictional political thriller that depicted an assassination plot against U.S. President Ted Kennedy. Among the many literary prizes awarded to Viking authors during his tenure as president were eight National Book Awards, three Pulitzer Prizes, and two Nobel Prizes in literature. Guinzburg published books by Saul Bellow, Kingsley Amis, Rebecca West, Nadine Gordimer, Graham Greene, Wallace Stegner, John Ashberry, Arthur Miller, Hannah Arendt, Malcolm Cowley, Jimmy Breslin, Gordon Parks, Jack Kerouac, Ken Kesey, James Baldwin, Iris Murdoch and John Steinbeck who was Best Man at his wedding to Rusty Unger. He published Gravity's Rainbow, by Thomas Pynchon, which won the National Book Award the following year. As a now infamous stunt, Guinzburg had comedian Irwin Corey accept the award on Pynchon's behalf, delivering a hilarious stream-of-consciousness speech in which he referred to the author as "Richard Python".

In 1980, he was a founding member of the original Rotisserie Baseball League, one of the earliest examples of fantasy baseball.

Guinzburg was an active philanthropist. As part of Eugene Lang's I Have a Dream Foundation, he actively mentored and sponsored a class of students from Brownsville, Brooklyn, beginning when they were in 6th grade and for those who eventually matriculated, seeing them through college. He also founded The Dream Team of Memorial Sloan–Kettering Cancer Center, which fulfills the wishes of adult cancer patients.

Guinzburg died in Manhattan at age 84 on September 8, 2010, due to complications of heart bypass surgery. He was survived by a companion of 15 years, Victoria Anstead, two granddaughters, a daughter, producer Kate Guinzburg (1957-2017) and a son, author Michael Guinzburg, from his first wife, actress Rita Gam, whom he married in 1956. He was also survived by his youngest daughter, Amanda Guinzburg from his second marriage to writer-editor Rusty Unger with whom he remained close friends
