= Koji Shitara =

Japanese actor, composer, and producer

- 設楽 幸嗣
- Born: June 4, 1946 (age 80); Sakata, Yamagata, Japan
- Other name: Muneyuki Korakuan
- Education: Kunitachi College of Music
- Occupations: Composer; musician; music producer; actor
- Years active: 1951–1969 (acting); 1978–present (composing)
- Relatives: Tōru Takemitsu (uncle)
- Website: fbc1978.com

Koji Shitara (設楽 幸嗣(こうじ), Shitara Kōji; born June 4, 1946) is a Japanese composer and former actor. Beginning his career as a child actor in 1951, he appeared in 30 films before transitioning to composing, inspired by his uncle, Tōru Takemitsu.

== Life and career ==
Shitara was born on June 4, 1946, in Sakata, Yamagata, Japan. His father, Kōsei Shitara, was the chairman of the Japan Orthodox Destiny Studies Research Association; his mother was a Japanese tea ceremony practitioner. Shitara's uncle was composer Tōru Takemitsu. Shitara started learning how to play the piano at the age of three and made his first piece two years later. He attended Tamagawa Gakuen and Kunitachi College of Music.

Shitara began his career as a child actor in 1951, debuting in If I Knew It Was a Dream (released in 1952). He later appeared in The Flavor of Green Tea over Rice (1952), Yellow Crow (1957), Good Morning (1959), Late Autumn (1960), and the American-Japanese co-production The Big Wave (1961). After appearing in 30 films, Shitara decided to shift to composing, influenced by his uncle, Tōru Takemitsu. As of 2015, he remains a well-known and recognized actor in Japanese films despite having retired from acting in 1969.

His mother inducted him into the Japanese tea ceremony at the age of eight. He later became a professor at a tea ceremony school under the name "Muneyuki Korakuan". At the age of 24, his mother asked him to become the head of the school but he wanted to move to the United States instead. In 1971, he traveled to the United States to study composition and arranging. He officially started his career in music in 1978, first performing at Aoyama Tower Hall in June of that year.

== Partial filmography ==
=== Acting ===
- If I Knew It Was a Dream (1952)
- Tonkatsu Taisho (1952)
- That Night's Wife (1952)
- The Flavor of Green Tea over Rice (1952)
- Salaryman's Song (1953)
- Children's Eyes (1956)
- Yellow Crow (1957)
- Good Morning (1959)
- Shingo Jūban Shōbu (TV 1960)
- Late Autumn (1960)
- The Big Wave (1961)
- Ohanahan (TV 1966–1967)
- Flowers and Vase (TV 1969)

=== Composer ===
- Wednesday Grand Romance (TV 1989)
- Are You Stealing My Daughter? (TV 1991)
- Why Won't She Get Married? (1992)
