= Social studies =

Integrated study of social sciences and humanities

In many countries' curricula, social studies is the combined study of humanities, the arts, and social sciences, mainly including history, economics, and civics. The term was coined by American educators around the turn of the twentieth century as a catch-all for these subjects, as well as others which did not fit into the models of lower education in the United States such as philosophy and psychology. One of the purposes of social studies, particularly at the level of higher education, is to integrate several disciplines, with their unique methodologies and special focus of concentration, into a coherent field of subject areas that communicate with each other by sharing different academic "tools" and perspectives for deeper analysis of social problems and issues. Social studies aims to train students for informed, responsible participation in a diverse democratic society. It provides the necessary background knowledge in order to develop values and reasoned opinions, and the objective of the field is civic competence. Related terms are humanities, arts, and social sciences, abbreviated HASS.

== Branches of social studies ==
Social studies is not a subject unto itself; instead, it functions as a field of study that incorporates many different subjects. It primarily includes the subjects of history, economics, and civics. Through all of that, the elements of geography, sociology, ethics, psychology, philosophy, anthropology, art and literature are incorporated into the subject field itself. The field of study itself focuses on human beings and their respective relationships. With that, many of these subjects include some form of social utility that is beneficial to the subject field itself. The whole field is rarely taught; typically, a few subjects combined are taught. Recognition of the field has, arguably, lessened the significance of history, with the exception of U.S. History. Initially, only History and Civics were significant parts of the high school curriculum; eventually, Economics became a significant part of the high school curriculum, as well. While History and Civics were already established, the significance of Economics in the high school curriculum is more recent. History and Civics are similar in many ways, though they differ in class activity. There was some division between scholars on the topic of merging the subjects, though it was agreed that presenting a full picture of the world to students was extremely important.

=== College level ===
Social studies as a college major or concentration remains uncommon, although such a degree is offered at Harvard University. Harvard first introduced social studies as a formal field of study in 1960, through the work of a committee led by Stanley Hoffman, and today known as the Committee on Degrees in Social Studies. Those who concentrated in social studies during their time at Harvard include Senate Minority Leader Chuck Schumer (1971), Rage Against the Machine guitarist Tom Morello (1986), hedge fund manager Bill Ackman and theater director Diana Paulus (both in 1988), and journalist Sewell Chan (1998).

== Australia ==
Humanities and Social Sciences (HASS) is taught in Australian schools and divided into 4 categories: history, civics and citizenship, economics and geography. Human Society and Its Environment (HSIE) is a similar term used in the education system of the Australian state of New South Wales.

== United States ==
The subject was introduced to promote social welfare and its development in countries like the United States and others.

An early concept of social studies is found in John Dewey's philosophy of elementary and secondary education. Dewey valued the subject field of geography for uniting the study of human occupations with the study of the earth. He valued inquiry as a process of learning, as opposed to the absorption and recitation of facts, and he advocated for greater inquiry in elementary and secondary education, to mirror the kind of learning that takes place in higher education. His ideas are manifested to a large degree in the practice of inquiry-based learning and student-directed investigations implemented in contemporary social studies classrooms. Dewey valued the study of history for its social processes and application to contemporary social problems, rather than a mere narrative of human events. In this view, the study of history is made relevant to the modern student and is aimed at the improvement of society.

In the United States through the 1900s, social studies revolved around the study of geography, government, and history. In 1912, the Bureau of Education (not to be confused with its successor, the United States Department of Education) was tasked by then Secretary of the Interior Franklin Knight Lane with completely restructuring the American education system for the twentieth century. In response, the Bureau of Education, together with the National Education Association, created the Commission on the Reorganization of Secondary Education. The commission was made up of 16 committees (a 17th was established two years later, in 1916), each one tasked with the reform of a specific aspect of the American Education system. Among these was the Committee on Social Studies, which was created to consolidate and standardize subjects that did not fit within normal school curricula into a new subject, to be called "the social studies".

The work done by the Committee on Social Studies culminated in the publication of Bulletin No. 28, which was entitled The Social Studies in Secondary Education. The 66-page bulletin, published and distributed by the Bureau of Education, is believed to be the first work dedicated entirely to the subject. It was designed to introduce the concept to American educators and serve as a guide for the creation of nationwide curricula based around social studies. The bulletin proposed many ideas that were considered radical at the time, and it is regarded by many educators as one of the most controversial educational resources of the early twentieth century. Early proponents of the field of social studies include Harold O. Rugg and David Saville Muzzey.

In the years after its release, the bulletin received criticism from educators on its vagueness, especially in regards to the definition of social studies itself. Critics often point to Section 1 of the report, which vaguely defines social studies as "understood to be those whose subject matter relates directly to the organization and development of human society, and to man as a member of social groups."

The changes to the field of study didn't fully materialize until the 1950s, when changes occurred at the state and national levels that dictated the curriculum and the preparation standards of its teachers. This led to a decrease in the amount of factual knowledge being delivered, and instead focused on key concepts, generalizations, and intellectual skills. By the 1980s and 1990s, the development of computer technologies helped grow the publishing industry. Textbooks were created around the curriculum of each state and that, coupled with the increase in political factors from globalization and growing economies, lead to changes in the public and private education systems. Now came the influx of national curriculum standards, from the increase of testing to the accountability of teachers and school districts shifting the social study education system to what it has become.

=== Teaching social studies ===
To teach social studies in public schoools in the United States at the secondary level, that is middle and high school, one must ordinarily obtain a valid teaching certification to teach in that given state and a valid subject specific certification in social studies. The social studies certification process focuses on the core areas of history, economics, and civics, and sometimes psychology, and sociology. Each state has specific requirements for the certification process and the teacher must follow the specific guidelines of the state they wish to teach in.

=== Ten themes of social studies ===
According to the National Council for the Social Studies, there are ten themes that represent the standards about human experience that is constituted in the effectiveness of social studies as a subject study from pre-K through 12th grade.

==== Culture ====
The study of culture and diversity allows learners to experience culture through all stages from learning to adaptation, shaping their respective lives and society itself. This social studies theme includes the principles of multiculturalism, a field of study in its own right that aims to achieve greater understanding between culturally diverse groups of students as well as including the experiences of culturally diverse learners in the curriculum.

==== Time, continuity, and change ====
Learners examine the past and the history of events that lead to the development of the current world. Ultimately, the learners will examine the beliefs and values of the past to apply them to the present. Learners build their inquiry skills in the study of history.

==== People, places, and environment ====
Learners will understand who they are and the environment and places that surround them. It gives spatial views and perspectives of the world to the learner. This theme is largely contained in the field of geography, which includes the study of humanity's connections with resources, instruction in reading maps and techniques and perspectives in analyzing information about human populations and the Earth's systems.

==== Individual development and identity ====
Learners will understand their own personal identity, development, and actions. Through this, they will be able to understand the influences that surround them.

==== Individuals, groups, and institutions ====
Learners will understand how groups and institutions influence people's everyday lives. They will be able to understand how groups and institutions are formed, maintained, and changed.

==== Power, authority, and governance ====
Learners will understand the forms of power, authority, and governance from historical to contemporary times. They will become familiar with the purpose of power, and with the limits that power has on society.

==== Production, distribution, and consumption ====
Learners will understand the organization of goods and services, ultimately preparing the learner for the study of greater economic issues. The study of economic issues, and with it, financial literacy, is intended to increase students' knowledge and skills when it comes to participating in the economy as workers, producers, and consumers.

==== Science, technology, and society ====
Learners will understand the relationship between science, technology, and society, understanding the advancement through the years and the impacts they have had.

==== Global connections ====
Learners will understand the interactive environment of global interdependence and will understand the global connections that shape the everyday world.

==== Civic ideals and practices ====
Learners will understand the rights and responsibilities of citizens and learn to grow in their appreciation of active citizenship. Ultimately, this helps their growth as full participants in society. Some of the values that civics courses strive to teach are an understanding of the right to privacy, an appreciation for diversity in American society, and a disposition to work through democratic procedures. One of the curricular tools used in the field of civics education is a simulated congressional hearing. Social studies educators and scholars distinguish between different levels of civic engagement, from the minimal engagement or non-engagement of the legal citizen to the most active and responsible level of the transformative citizen. Within social studies, the field of civics aims to educate and develop learners into transformative citizens who not only participate in a democracy, but challenge the status quo in the interest of social justice.
