= Incontinence =

Incontinence or Incontinent may refer to:

- Urinary incontinence, the most commonly occurring type of incontinence, the involuntary excretion of urine
- Fecal incontinence, the involuntary excretion of bowel contents
- Lack of moderation or self-control, especially related to sexual desire - see Incontinence (philosophy)
- Incontinent (album), a 1981 album by Fad Gadget
