= No Exit (1962 film) =

1962 American film based on Jean-Paul Sartre's play directed by Tad Danielewski

- Theatrical release poster
- Directed by: Tad Danielewski
- Screenplay by: George Tabori
- Based on: No Exit by Jean-Paul Sartre
- Produced by: Fernando Ayala; Héctor Olivera
- Starring: Morgan Sterne; Viveca Lindfors; Rita Gam
- Cinematography: Ricardo Younis
- Edited by: Jacques Bart; Carl Lerner; Atilio Rinaldi
- Music by: Vladimir Ussachevsky
- Production company: Aries Cinematográfica Argentina
- Distributed by: Zenith International Films
- Release date: December 5, 1962 (United States)
- Running time: 85 minutes
- Countries: United States; Argentina
- Language: English

No Exit (also known as Sinners Go to Hell and Huis Clos) is a 1962 American-Argentine drama film directed by Tad Danielewski and starring Morgan Sterne, Viveca Lindfors and Rita Gam. It was written by George Tabori based on Jean-Paul Sartre's 1944 play No Exit.

The film uses dialogue-free flashbacks when the main characters talk about their lives.

== Plot ==
The Valet enters a hotel room with Joseph Garcin in tow. The windowless room has a single entrance and no mirrors. Two women, Inès Serrano and Estelle Rigault, are then led in. Afterwards, the Valet leaves and locks the door. Realizing that they are in hell, the trio expects to be tortured; no torturer is forthcoming. While waiting, they strike up a conversation and discuss each other's sins, desires, and unpleasant memories. They slowly realize that such probing is the form of torture they are meant to receive.

It later becomes apparent that Joseph, once a journalist, was executed for cowardice and the betrayal of the French Resistance. Estelle, who has a voracious sexual appetite, was a gold digger and seductress who killed a man. Meanwhile, the lesbian Inès abused her partner's love for her and eventually killed them both in a murder-suicide. As the story progresses, Garcin becomes increasingly annoyed by Inès' considering him a coward, while Estelle makes unreciprocated advances on him; Inès is tempted by Estelle, but crazed by Estelle's heterosexuality.

The three at first continue to see events happening on Earth but as the living move on, they are left with only their own thoughts and the company of the other two. Towards the end of the film, Garcin demands he be let out. In response, the door opens; none leave, resigning themselves to their fate.

== Cast ==
- Viveca Lindfors as Inès
- Rita Gam as Estelle
- Ben Piazza as Camarero
- Morgan Sterne as Garcin
- Susana Mayo as Florence
- Orlando Sacha as Gomez
- Manuel Roson as captain
- Mirtha Miller as Carmencita
- A. Iriarte as Rober Miguel
- Else Dorian as Shirley
- Mario Horna as Albert

== Production ==
Sartre did not know about the film while it was in production. Viveca Lindfors was at the time married to screenwriter George Tabori.

== Release ==
No Exit received its American release on December 5.

== Reception ==
Bosley Crowther, writing for The New York Times, found the film "antiseptic", with emotionless acting and stagy directing; he summarized that the film "prove[d] that "No Exit" is inappropriate material for a full-length [film]".

Variety wrote: "Based on a J. P. Sartre play which probes the tortured minds of three people destined to be together for eternity in hell, the pic is sincerely made though its transference to the screen medium is by no means successful. Name value of the stars and author will be an exploitation aid, but it looks only a fair arty theatre film. ... Tad Danielewski's direction does not attempt to conceal the legit origins of the piece, and it is largely a static play on film. The flashbacks provide some opportunity of action, but basically it is confined to the one room, and there's not much that can be done about it."

Alison Darren in the Lesbian Film Guide calls the film an "excellent psychological drama" with a "surprisingly overt" depiction of lesbianism, and notes that Inès is a "typical screen lesbian" of the early 1960s, both physically attractive and inherently evil.

== Accolades ==
At the 12th Berlin International Film Festival in June 1962, where Rita Gam and Viveca Lindfors shared the Silver Bear for Best Actress award.

== See also ==
- Huis clos (1954)

== Bibliography ==
- "Berlinale 1962: Prize Winners". berlinale.de. Archived from the original on December 30, 2011.
- Contat, Michel; Rybalka, Michel (1974). The Writings of Jean-Paul Sartre. Northwestern University Studies in Phenomenology & Existential Philosophy. Evanston: Northwestern University Press. ISBN 978-0-8101-0439-6.
- Crowther, Bosley (December 6, 1962). "Gay Purr-ee (1962) Screen: Sartre's 'No Exit' in Premiere at Sutton:His One-Act Play Was Adapted by Tabori Three Other Pictures Have Openings. 'Gay Purr--ee' Cartoon". The New York Times. Archived from the original on February 18, 2012.
- Darren, Alison (2000). Lesbian Film Guide. New York: Cassell. ISBN 978-0-304-33376-9.
- Feinberg, Anat (1999). Embodied Memory : The Theatre of George Tabori. Studies in Theatre History and Culture. Iowa City: University of Iowa Press. ISBN 978-0-87745-686-5.
- "Sinners Go to Hell (1962)". Internet Movie Database. Archived from the original on January 14, 2012.
