= Richard J. Walsh =

American publisher and social activist

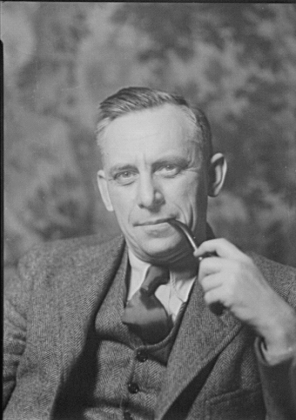
- Born: November 20, 1886; Lyons, Kansas, U.S.
- Died: May 28, 1960 (aged 73); Bucks County, Pennsylvania, U.S.
- Education: Harvard College
- Occupations: Publisher, editor, author
- Known for: Founder of John Day Company
- Notable work: Editor of Asia magazine; publisher of The Good Earth
- Spouse(s): Ruby Abbott (m. 1908; div. 1935); Pearl S. Buck (m. 1935)
- Children: 10

Richard John Walsh (20 November 1886 – 28 May 1960) was an American publisher and literary figure best known as one of the founders and editor of John Day Company. He was the second husband of Pearl S. Buck, and publisher of her first books, including The Good Earth. He edited Asia magazine from 1933 to 1946, and, in collaboration with Buck, published a wide variety of work by Asian and progressive authors that informed the Western public about Asia.

== Education and early life ==
Walsh was born and grew up in Lyons, Kansas. As an undergraduate at Harvard College he wrote for the Harvard Lampoon, along with Robert Benchley, graduating magna cum laude in 1907. He became first a reporter for the Boston Herald, and then worked as promotions manager for the Curtis Publishing Company. After World War One he worked for Herbert Hoover's United States Food Administration, then as a writer for Collier's Weekly and Women's Home Companion. In 1922, he published a small book with twenty-two page book of light verse and sketches, mostly dealing with pirates, Kidd: A Moral Opuscule. His book The Making of Buffalo Bill was written in collaboration with Milton Salsbury, the son of Buffalo Bill Cody's partner in the Wild West Show. They set out not so much to tell a story as to study of what Walsh called "the deliberate and infinitely skilful use of publicity." Pearl Buck's biographer, Peter J. Conn, remarks that the book is both "skeptical of manufactured celebrity and dazzled by the power of press agentry to manipulate public taste," which anticipated Walsh's relation with Pearl Buck: "she produced the fictional commodity; he delivered the market."

ln 1908 he married Ruby Abbott, and the couple had six children. In 1935, he divorced her and married Pearl S. Buck. He had six daughters and four sons, including Richard J. Walsh Jr., who succeeded him as president of John Day, Janice Comfort Walsh, and Edgar S. Walsh.

== Publishing career ==
In 1927, Walsh, Cleland Austin, Trell Yocum, and Guy Holt took over management of the John Day Company, named after the Elizabethan printer, John Day. The young company had little time to establish itself before the crash of 1929, but it published prestigious items such as James Branch Cabell, The Music from Behind the Moon. Walsh kept the company afloat by cutting his own salary and cashing his children's Liberty Bonds.

He took a risk when he accepted the manuscript of East Wind, West Wind, the first book by Pearl S. Buck, which had been turned down by many publishers. Walsh took the risk because he felt that Buck's second book would be better, and he made extensive suggestions to improve the manuscript. The book received mostly favorable reviews, though it did not sell especially well. The next year, John Day published Buck's The Good Earth, which became a best-seller for the next two years, saving John Day and creating a relation between Walsh and Buck. In 1935, after Walsh divorced his wife and Buck divorced her husband, the two married. The couple began a collaboration at John Day that introduced a wide range of Asian and American progressive culture, though the company relied on Buck to supply popular titles of her own.

Pearl Buck's books sold well, but the company had no other best-sellers until Margaret Landon's Anna and the King of Siam in 1944. Still, Walsh published well-regarded books on progressive education, two books by president Franklin D. Roosevelt, as well as those by Sidney Hook, Frances Perkins, John Chamberlain, and Harvey O’Connor.

In 1933, Walsh arranged to become editor of Asia magazine, in which Leonard Elmhirst, the British social reformer had a controlling interest, and agreed that it should change from travel and exotic fare to political and cultural interest. Walsh published many John Day authors and many of the contributors published with John Day. Buck was a friend or colleague of Asian and American figures and authors and Walsh published their works. A sampling of these includes the United States edition of Jawaharlal Nehru's Autobiography, Eslanda Robeson.

The company's financial difficulties led Walsh to arrange for Reynal and Hitchcock to carry out the physical production and distribution, but retained the editorial function. The books that he and his editors developed were called "John Day Books". They were published under the Reynal and Hitchcock imprint until 1939, when these functions were taken over by G. P. Putnam's Sons. Just after the war ended, the company established Asia Press as a subsidiary imprint.

Walsh was directly involved in soliciting, editing, and promoting manuscripts. He took a special interest in Lin Yutang, who became one of his most prolific and best selling authors. Buck had met Lin in Shanghai, encouraged him to come to the United States, and introduced him to Walsh. Walsh gave Lin extensive and detailed suggestions and directives on the manuscript of My Country and My People, which sold steadily and well. Walsh suggested to Lin that he write a novel concerning a Chinese American family but fearing that Lin was not familiar with their culture, was, in the words of one scholar, "dogged in his attempts to educate Lin, bombarding him with newspaper articles, historical tracts, and sociological tracts" as background material for the work that published as Chinatown Family.

Under Walsh, John Day and Reynall & Hitchcock published both traditional and contemporary Asian fiction. Walsh took particular pride in Buck's translation of the classic Water Margin, for which he chose the title All Men Are Brothers. It did not sell particularly well, but he regarded it as a prestige project. During the war he convinced Arthur Waley that John Day was the best publisher for the American edition of Monkey, with an Introduction by Hu Shi.

Walsh became chairman of the John Day board in 1959, but was quite ill and died in 1960.

== Social and political activities ==
Richard Walsh and Pearl Buck undertook advocacy as well and were prominent in almost every non-governmental relation with China. East and West Association undertook a wide range of cultural and social activities,. Richard was on the board of the Mass Education Movement, which raised money for rural reconstruction in China and a strong supporter of United Relief to China. He was chairman of the India League of America, and honorary first president of the Art Directors League. Sirdar Jagjit Singh of the India League of America established a close rapport with Walsh and Buck. By 1943, the League shared office space on East 49th Street with the East and West Association.

== Selected publications ==
- Walsh, Richard J. Selling Forces. Philadelphia: The Curtis publishing company, 1913. Hathi
- ---, Kidd: A Moral Opuscule. New York: W.E. Rudge, 1922. Light verse and pirate sketches. Internet Archive.
- ---, and William James. An Alternative Use of Force: When the Earth Trembled. Worcester, Mass., New York City: Carnegie Endowment for International Peace, Division of Intercourse and Education, 1926.
- ---, Zanesville and 36 Other American Communities; a Study of Markets and of the Telephone as a Market Index. New York: The Literary Digest, 1927.
- —— (1928), The Making of Buffalo Bill: A Study in Heroics, in collaboration with Milton S. Salsbury, New York, Chicago: Burt. Online at Internet Archive listing.
- Polo, Marco, Richard J Walsh, ed., The Adventures of Marco Polo, as Dictated in Prison to a Scribe in the Year 1298; What He Experienced and Heard during His Twenty-Four Years Spent in Travel through Asia and at the Court of Kublai-Khan. New York: John Day Co., 1948.
- --- with Gerard Swope, "Mass Education Movement and JCRR." Far Eastern Survey 20.14 (1951): 145–148.
- ---, and Lila Agree. Treating Your Hyperactive and Learning Disabled Child : What You Can Do. 1st ed. Garden City, N.Y: Anchor Press/Doubleday, 1979.

== References and further reading ==
- Conn, Peter J. (1996). Pearl S. Buck: A Cultural Biography. Cambridge England; New York: Cambridge University Press. ISBN 0521560802.
- Hsu, Hua (2016). A Floating Chinaman: Fantasy and Failure across the Pacific. Cambridge, Massachusetts ; London, England: Harvard University Press. ISBN 9780674967908.
- "Intext Purchases the John Day Company," Publishers Weekly 194 (30 December 1968): 46. 11
- "John Day Celebrates Its Tenth Anniversary," Publishers Weekly 130 (25 July 1936): 255–256.
- Pryor, Elizabeth (1986). "The John Day Company". In Dzwonkoski, Peter (ed.). American Literary Publishing Houses, 1900-1980: Trade and Paperback. Detroit: Gale Research Company. pp. 104–7.
- So, Richard Jean (2016). Transpacific Community: The Rise and Fall of a Sino-American Cultural Network. New York: Columbia University Press. ISBN 9780231176965.
