= John Day Company =

American publishing firm

- Status: Defunct
- Founded: 1926
- Founder: Richard J. Walsh
- Successor: Thomas Y. Crowell Co.
- Country of origin: United States
- Headquarters location: New York City, U.S.
- Publication types: Books
- No. of employees: 250

The John Day Company was a New York City-based publishing firm that specialized in illustrated fiction and current affairs books and pamphlets from 1926 to 1968. It was founded by Richard J. Walsh in 1926 and named after John Day, the Elizabethan printer. Walsh was the editor and second husband of Pearl S. Buck. The textbook company Intext acquired the John Day Company in 1968. Intext was sold to the Thomas Y. Crowell Co. in 1974.

== Authors ==
Some of the many authors associated with John Day Publishing.

- Chinua Achebe
- Irving Adler
- Peggy Adler
- Anauta Blackmore
- Scott Buchanan
- Pearl S. Buck
- James Burnham
- Buwei Yang Chao
- Stuart Chase
- Peter Drucker
- Albert Einstein
- Langston Hughes
- Sidney Hook
- Jawaharlal Nehru
- Patrick O'Brian
- Franklin D. Roosevelt
- Joseph Stalin
- Leon Trotsky
- Rexford Guy Tugwell
- Lin Yutang

== Pamphlet Series ==
The Great Depression led to a steep decline in book sales in the early 1930s, this led to a small revival in pamphlet literature. Between 1932 and 1934 the John Day Company published a pamphlet series known as The John Day Pamphlet Series. In total, 45 were published. They are as follows:

- Rebecca West, Arnold Bennett Himself
- Stuart Chase, Out of the Depression—and After: A Prophecy
- Joseph Vissarionovich Stalin, The New Russian Policy: June 23, 1931
- Norman Edwin Himes, The Truth about Birth Control: With a Bibliography of Birth Control Literature
- Walter Lippmann, Notes on the Crisis
- Charles Austin Beard, The Myth of Rugged American Individualism
- Rexford Guy Tugwell, Mr. Hoover's Economic Policy
- Herman Hagedorn, The three pharaohs: a dramatic poem
- Marion Hawthorne Hedges, A Strikeless Industry: A Review of the National Council on Industrial Relations for the Electrical Construction Industry
- Gilbert Seldes, Against Revolution
- George Sylvester Counts, Dare the School Build a New Social Order? (Special, 56 pages)
- Hendrik Willem Van Loon, To Have or to Be—Take Your Choice
- Norman Thomas, The Socialist Cure for a Sick Society
- Herbert George Wells, What Should be Done—Now: A Memorandum on the World Situation
- Victor Francis Calverton, For Revolution
- Horace Meyer Kallen, College Prolongs Infancy
- Richard Bartlett Gregg, Gandhiism versus Socialism
- Pearl Sydenstricker Buck, Is There a Case for Foreign Missions?
- Stuart Chase, Technocracy: An Interpretation
- Albert Einstein, The Fight Against War. Edited by Alfred Lief. (Special, 64 pages)
- Arthur Gordon Melvin, Education for a New Era: a Call to Leadership
- John Strachey, Unstable Money
- Ambrose William Benkert and Earl Harding, How to Restore Values: The Quick, Safe Way Out of the Depression
- Everett Ross Clinchy, The Strange Case of Herr Hitler
- Walter Lippmann, A New Social Order
- Elwyn Brooks White, Alice Through the Cellophane
- Osgood Nichols and Comstock Glaser, Work Camps for America
- Louis Morton Hacker, The Farmer is Doomed
- Archibald MacLeish, Frescoes for Mr. Rockefeller's City
- Committee of the Progressive Education Association on Social and Economic Problems, A Call to the Teachers of the Nation
- Henry Hazlitt, Instead of Dictatorship
- Stuart Chase, The Promise of Power
- Matthew Josephson, Nazi Culture: The Brown Darkness Over Germany
- Maurice Finkelstein, The Dilemma of the Supreme Court: Is the N.R.A. Constitutional?
- Leon Trotsky, What Hitler Wants
- Audacity! More Audacity! Always Audacity!, Published in Cooperation with The United Action Campaign Committee
- Harold Rugg and Marvin Krueger, Study Guide to National Recovery: An Introduction to Economic Problems
- Bertram David Wolfe, Marx and America
- Marquis William Childs, Sweden: Where Capitalism is Controlled
- Sir Arthur Salter, Toward a Planned Economy
- Edward Albert Filene, The Consumer's Dollar
- Rev. John Haynes Holmes, Is Suicide Justifiable?
- Mary Catherine Philips and Frederick John Schlink, Discovering Consumers
- James Rorty, Order on the Air!
- Stuart Chase, Move the Goods!

The last page of pamphlet 45 is currently visible on HathiTrust, listing all pamphlets in order.

== Other book series ==
- Creative Music Series
- The Daughters of Valor Series
- Finding Out About Geography
- Finding Out About Science
- Great Men of Science
- Here's How Series
- Let's Visit series
- The Living Drama Series (Series editor: William Kozlenko)
- John Day Books in Contemporary Education
- The John Day Intimate Guide Series
- The New York Times Survey Series
- Our Neighbors series
- Picture Aids to World Geography
- The Reason Why Series
- Scientists at Work Series
- The World of Architecture
- The Young Historian Series (Series editor: Patrick Moore)
- The Your Fair Land Series
