= Stratton Mountain (Massachusetts) =

Mountain in Massachusetts, United States

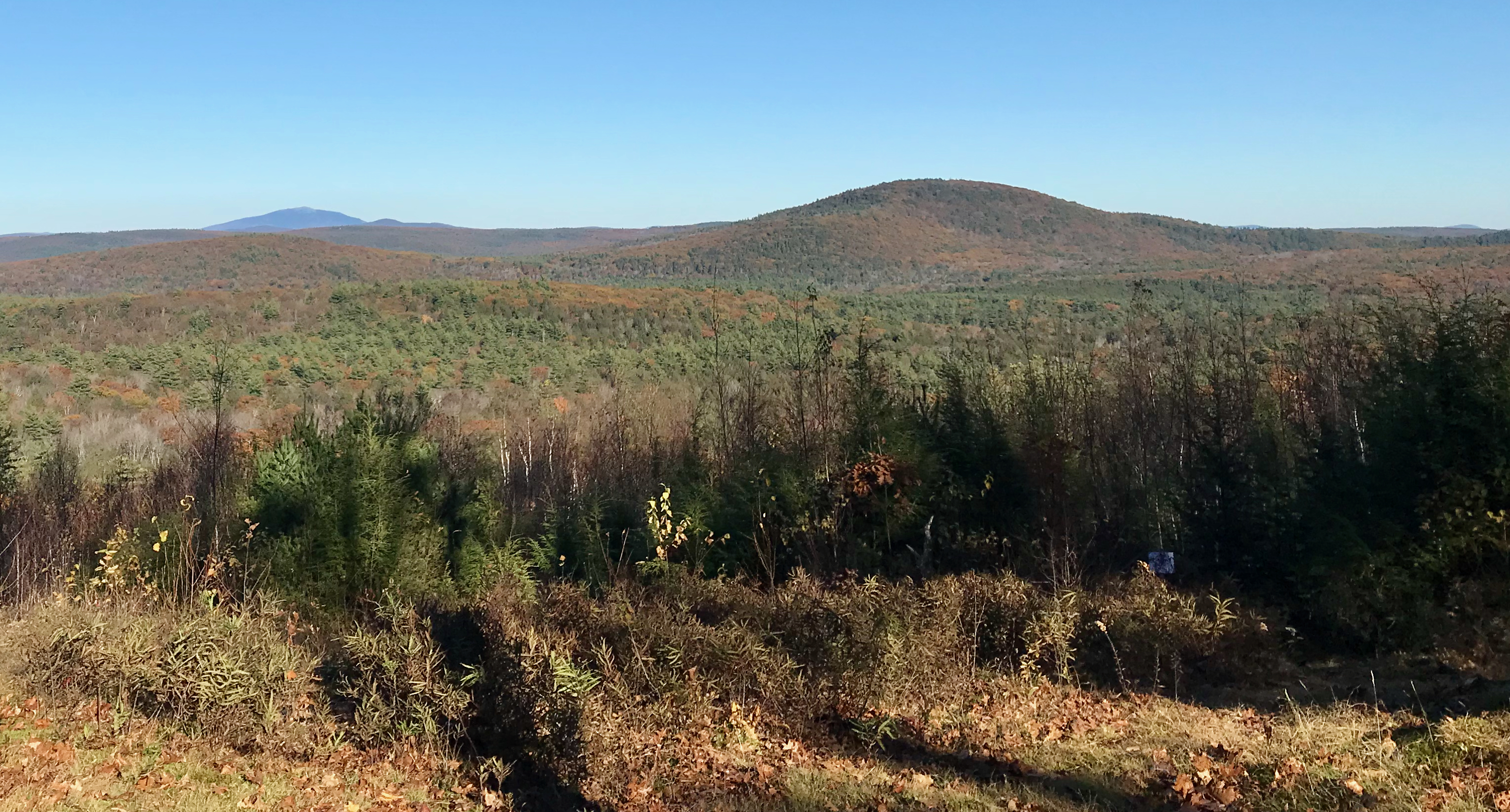
- View from East Vista on Stratton Mountain in Northfield Massachusetts of Mt Monadnock (left) and Mt Grace (right).

Highest point
- Elevation: 1,285 ft (392 m)
- Coordinates: 42°41′0″N 72°24′58″W

Geography
- Location: Northfield, Massachusetts
- Parent range: Bald Hills

Geology
- Rock age: 400 million years
- Mountain type(s): Arête; quartzite

Climbing
- Easiest route: Metacomet-Monadnock Trail / New England National Scenic Trail

Stratton Mountain, 392 metres (1,286 ft), of the Bald Hills region of east Franklin County, Massachusetts is located partially within Northfield State Forest parcels south of Alexander Hill Road.

Stratton Mountain is located within the town of Northfield, Massachusetts and is within the drainage basin of the Connecticut River.

The L-shaped mountain offers expansive views from atop its eastern and western slopes. Stratton Mountain is composed of quartzite, a weather-resistant metamorphic rock.

The 114 miles (602,000 ft) mile Metacomet-Monadnock Trail, a section of the national New England National Scenic Trail, traverses both the East and West views.

A north-south powerline cut traverses Stratton Mountain near Alexander Hill Road and then continues but changes direction to the south-southwest closely paralleling the mountain's western slope also heading south-southwestward.

== Camping ==
The AMC Robinson/Zlogar cabin, built by the Appalachian Mountain Club's Berkshire Chapter, provides views from the summit's eastern slope of Mt. Monadnock and Mount Grace. This was private land owned by the Richardson family, which had donated the conservation rights on the land to the Town of Northfield.

In the summer of 2021, Sam and Barbara Richardson transferred the ownership of the thirty-two (32) acres containing the AMC's cabin, the Richardson Overlook (East Vista) and the West Vista to the Mount Grace Land Conservation Trust. The Appalachian Mountain Club's Berkshire Chapter continues to run and maintain the Robinson/Zlogar cabin. The cabin can be reserved to rent. There are several fireplaces, overnight tent platforms, chairs and picnic tables at the eastern vista.

The western vista, on the summit's western slope, has an arrangement of large stones, including one known as the 'sundial'.

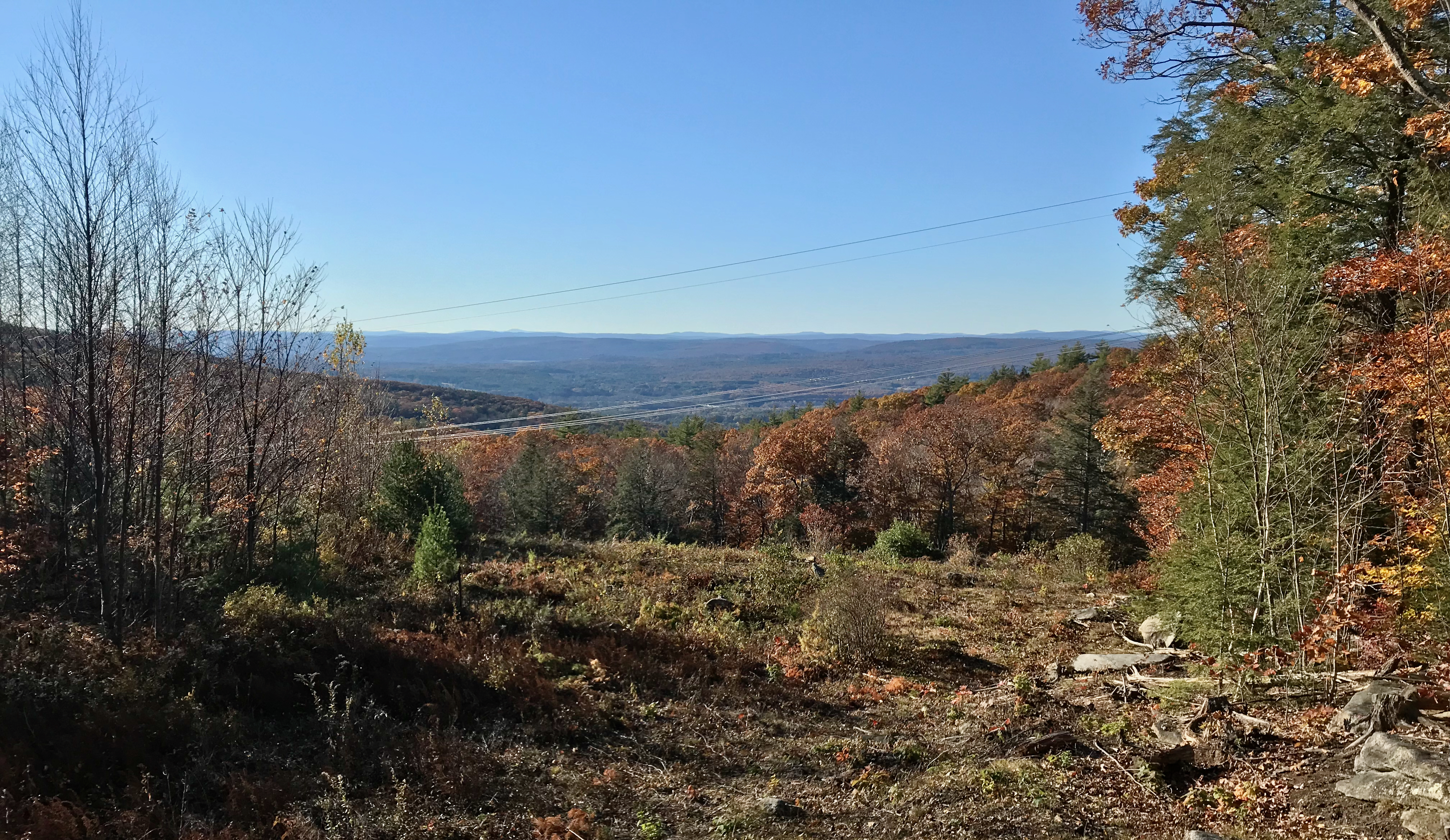
View from the west vista on Stratton Mountain in Northfield, Massachusetts.
