= Tad Danielewski =

Polish-American film director (1921–1993)

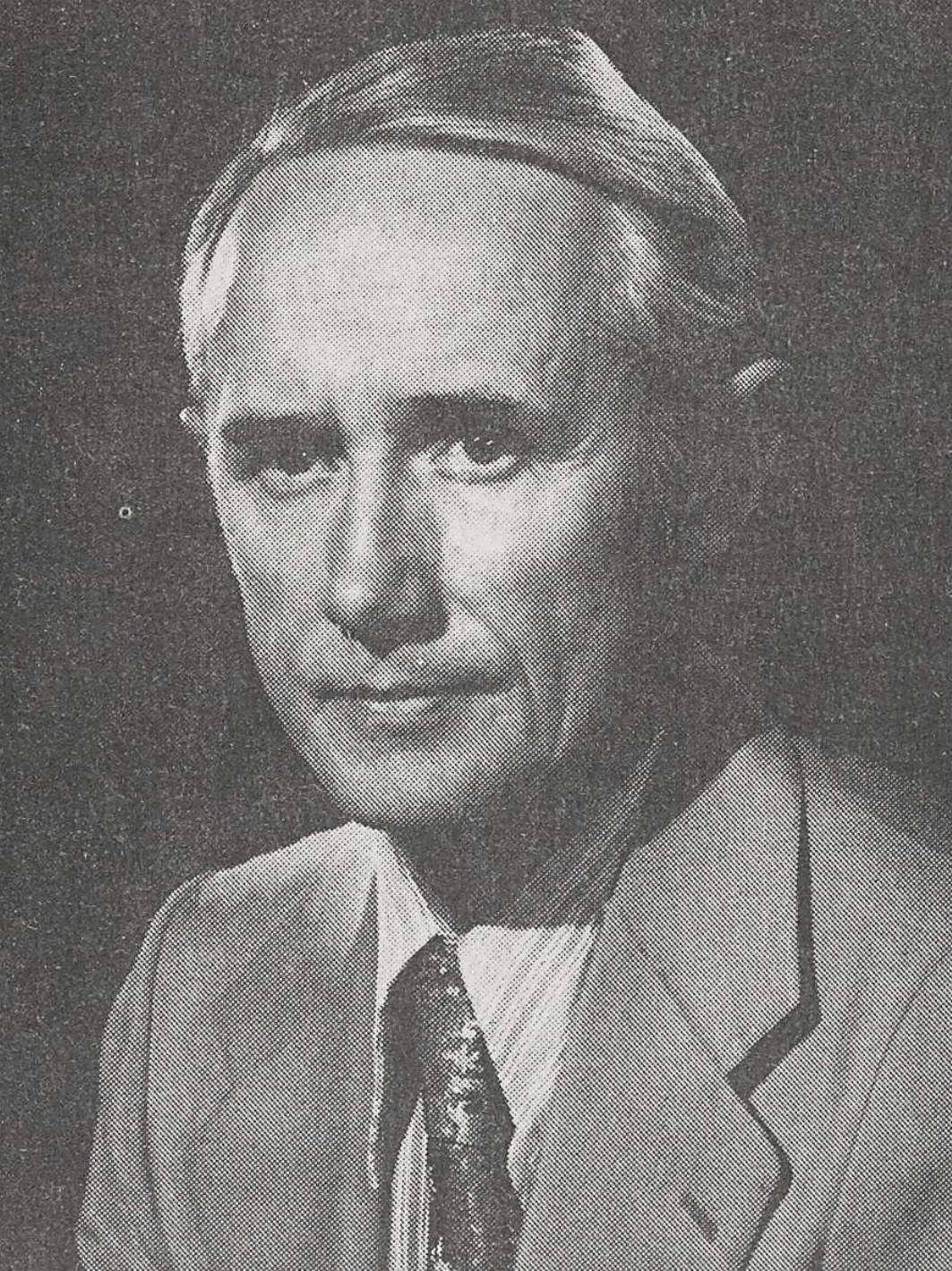
- Danielewski c. 1975
- Born: Tadeusz Zbigniew Danielewski; March 29, 1921; Radom, Poland
- Died: January 6, 1993 (aged 71); Los Angeles, California, U.S.
- Citizenship: Poland; U.S. (from 1954)
- Occupations: Director; producer; screenwriter; acting coach
- Spouses: Sylvia Daneel (m. 1950; div. 1964); Priscilla Decatur Machold (m. 1964); Lillian D'Arc (before 1993)
- Children: Christopher; Mark; Poe

Tadeusz Zbigniew Danielewski (March 29, 1921 – January 6, 1993) was a Polish-American film, television, and theater director and acting coach. The co-founder of Stratton Productions, he was known for directing The Big Wave (1961), No Exit (1962), and The Guide (1965). His children include author Mark Z. Danielewski and singer Poe.

== Early life ==
Born as Tadeusz Zbigniew Danielewski in Radom, Poland, he served in the Polish Underground during World War II but was captured and interred in a Nazi work camp until rescued by Patton's forces. He and his wife, actress Sylvia Daneel (née Sylwia Jadwiga Łakomska), emigrated to the United States in 1948. They formalized their union in the United States with a civil ceremony in Los Angeles, California on June 9, 1950, and shortly after began studying at the University of Iowa. They were naturalized as United States citizens on April 19, 1954 through a Special Act of Congress. The couple later divorced.

== Career ==
After the war, he studied at the Royal Academy of Dramatic Art in London and started the Professional Actors Workshop in New York City, whose students included Martin Sheen, James Earl Jones, Mercedes Ruehl, and Sigourney Weaver. He was president of Stratton Productions, Inc. (NYC), a firm engaged in stage, film and TV productions.

He worked at NBC as a studio supervisor and helped develop a new method for directing TV programs. In 1983, he provided the Polish translation of "Sweet Georgia Brown" for Mel Brooks's 1983 adaptation of To Be or Not to Be. He worked at the Brigham Young University Department of Theatre and Cinematic Arts from 1975–89. He moved to head up the USC drama department in Los Angeles until his death in 1993.

== Personal life ==
Danielewski was married three times: first to actress Sylvia Daneel (née Sylvia Jadwiga Łakomska; 1927–2025), with whom he had a son, Christopher Danielewski; second to Priscilla Decatur Machold (later Mrs. Loeb), with whom he had two children: the novelist Mark Z. Danielewski, of House of Leaves fame, and the musician Poe (Anne Danielewski); third to Lillian Danielewski–that union was childless and ended with Tad Danielewski's death.

== Death ==
Danielewski died of cancer in 1993 in Los Angeles, California, aged 71. He was survived by his widow, Lillian, as well as his former wives, and his three children from his first two marriages.

== Filmography ==
- 1961: The Big Wave
- 1962: No Exit
- 1965: Guide
- 1972: España puerta abierta
