= Alma Willis Sydenstricker =

American college professor

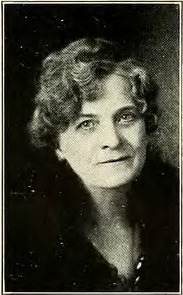
- Alma Willis Sydenstricker, from the 1927 yearbook of Agnes Scott College
- Born: Lucy Alma Willis; April 21, 1866; Montgomery City, Missouri, U.S.
- Died: November 26, 1960 (aged 94)
- Occupations: Bible scholar, philosopher, college professor, clubwoman
- Relatives: Pearl S. Buck (niece); Absalom Sydenstricker (brother-in-law); Edgar Sydenstricker (nephew)

Lucy Alma Willis Sydenstricker (April 21, 1866 – November 26, 1960) was an American college professor and clubwoman. She taught religion classes at Agnes Scott College from 1917 to 1943, and was active in the Presbyterian Church in the United States.

== Early life and education ==
Alma Willis was born in Montgomery City, Missouri, the daughter of Virgil Alexander Willis and Lucy J. Phillips Willis. Her father was a physician. She attended Montgomery Female College, and the American Institute of Sacred Literature. She completed doctoral studies in philosophy at the College of Wooster in 1895, with a dissertation titled "The Power of Expression: A Psychological and Ethical Study". She was one of the first American women to earn a Ph.D. in philosophy. In 1925, she traveled to Palestine to study at the American School of Oriental Research in Jerusalem.

== Career ==
Sydenstricker taught in the history department at the Mississippi Industrial Institute and College from 1914 to 1917, and Bible classes at Agnes Scott College from 1917 to 1943. In 1922 she taught at the Summer School of Missions at Montreat. She visited excavations and ruins in Italy, Greece, Palestine, and Egypt. She spoke to the Agnes Scott alumnae in Atlanta in 1935, about her travels around the Mediterranean, and in 1937, about her niece, writer Pearl S. Buck.

Sydenstricker was a member of the Southern Association of College Women, the Daughters of the American Revolution, and the United Daughters of the Confederacy. From 1912 to 1919, she was first president of the Mississippi Synodical, the state chapter of the Women's Auxiliary of the Presbyterian Church in the United States (PCUS). She taught Bible studies into her nineties in Arkansas.

== Publications ==
- "The Power of Expression: A Psychological and Ethical Study" (1895)
- "Ante-Bellum Women of the South" (1912. also published as "The Ante-Bellum Woman")
- "The Place of the Bible in the College Curriculum" (1922)

== Personal life ==
Alma Willis married pastor and writer Hiram Mason Sydenstricker, whose brother was Presbyterian missionary Absalom Sydenstricker. They had two sons, Virgil and Vivian. Their son Virgil Preston Sydenstricker (1889–1964) became a noted physician and medical researcher. Her husband died in 1914. She lived with her son and daughter-in-law in Batesville, Arkansas, after she retired. She died in 1960, at the age of 94.
