= Dragon Seed =

Dragon Seed may refer to:

- Dragon Seed (novel), written by Pearl S. Buck
  - Dragon Seed (film), its adaptation
- Dragonseeds, a 1998 video game for the PlayStation
