= Katherine (Min novel) =

Novel by Anchee Min

- Author: Anchee Min
- Publisher: Riverhead Books (US); Hamish Hamilton (UK)
- Publication date: 1995
- ISBN: 978-1-57322-005-7 (US edition)

Katherine (ISBN 1-57322-005-1) is the first novel by Anchee Min. It was published by Riverhead Books in 1995.

== Background ==
The novel was originally written in English and was not translated from another language. Min stated that she could not properly convey her feelings in Chinese.

== Plot summary ==
Six years after the death of Mao, the People's Republic of China opens its doors to learn how to integrate into the larger world. The title character, a thirty-six-year-old English teacher in Shanghai, learns a great deal of Chinese culture from interacting with her students in and out of class.

The narrator of the novel, twenty-nine-year-old Zebra Wong, is one of the students who eventually helps her adopt a Chinese girl, Little Rabbit. However, the principal of the school Katherine teaches at, Mr. Han, becomes suspicious of Katherine's after-class activities and, with the help of Katherine's student and spurned lover Lion Head, seizes upon her "corrupting Western influence" to call for her dismissal. Katherine appeals to the U.S. consul in Shanghai, but she is returned to America. She maintains contact with Zebra and tries to make arrangements for her and Little Rabbit to come to the United States as well.

== Reception ==
In 2000, the Chicago Tribune stated that the reviews of the book tended to be "cool" (meaning negative).

A review in Publishers Weekly found the novel to be poorer than Min's first book, the memoir Red Azalea.

The book was banned in China.

At one point Oprah Winfrey bought the rights to make a film of this book.
