= China Sky (film) =

1945 film by Ray Enright

- Original film poster
- Directed by: Ray Enright
- Screenplay by: Joseph Hoffman; Brenda Weisberg
- Based on: China Sky (1941 novel) by Pearl S. Buck
- Produced by: Jack J. Gross
- Starring: Randolph Scott; Ruth Warrick; Ellen Drew; Anthony Quinn
- Cinematography: Nicholas Musuraca
- Edited by: Marvin Coil; Gene Milford
- Music by: Leigh Harline
- Production company: RKO Radio Pictures
- Distributed by: RKO Pictures
- Release date: May 24, 1945 (U.S.)
- Running time: 78 minutes
- Country: United States
- Language: English

China Sky (aka Pearl Buck's China Sky) is a 1945 RKO Pictures war-drama film based on the novel by Pearl S. Buck. (Note: Pearl Sydenstricker Buck (June 26, 1892 – March 6, 1973) was also known by her Chinese name Sai Zhenzhju (Chinese: 賽珍珠; pinyin: Sài Zhēnzhū). Buck was an American writer who spent most of her time until 1934 in China. Her novel, The Good Earth was the best-selling fiction book in the U.S. in 1931 and 1932, and won the Pulitzer Prize in 1932. She was awarded the Nobel Prize in Literature (1938) "for her rich and truly epic descriptions of peasant life in China and for her biographical masterpieces.") It was directed by Ray Enright and featured movie idol Randolph Scott, teamed with Ruth Warrick, Ellen Drew and Anthony Quinn. Although set in wartime China, Quinn and other lead actors portrayed Chinese characters, in keeping with other period films that employed Caucasian actors in Asian roles.

China Sky was one of the last in a succession of wartime films depicting the Chinese confronting Japanese invaders that included: A Yank on the Burma Road (1942), China Girl (1942), Flying Tigers (1942), China (1943), Behind the Rising Sun (1943), Thirty Seconds Over Tokyo (1944), Dragon Seed (1944), God Is My Co-Pilot (1945) and China's Little Devils, released May 27, 1945. Similar to many of the other treatments, Chinese characters in China Sky were in secondary or subservient roles, with the versatile and highly malleable Quinn taking on another nationality, having already played countless other roles as an Indian, Mafia don, Hawaiian chief, Filipino freedom-fighter, French pirate, Spanish bullfighter and Arab sheik. (Note: Anthony Quinn as Juan Martínez / Francisco Morez in The Ox-Bow Incident (1943) actually portrayed a Latin American, his true heritage.)

== Plot ==
Dr. Gray Thompson, an American missionary doctor, works alongside Dr. Sara Durand in a hospital he has built in a small hilltop Chinese village, while Japanese forces descend on China. When Gray returns from a trip, he shocks Sara (who is in love with him) by introducing his new socialite wife, Louise. Bored and feeling out of place, Louise tries to persuade him to give up his dangerous cause. In the midst of aerial bombing attacks on the village, Dr. Thompson unselfishly helps the local residents, and especially the insurgent leader Chen-Ta, who loves nurse Siu-Mei, betrothed to Dr. Kim, a sympathetic Chinese/Korean doctor.

Col. Yasuda, a high-ranking, injured Japanese prisoner, manipulates Dr. Kim into sending a (coded) message, purportedly from Louise, to his side that the village is secretly harboring an ammunition dump. Gray and the others become puzzled when Japanese airplanes stop attacking their village. When Japanese paratroops descend on the village, Gray organizes the defense and sends a messenger to Chen Ta. During the brutal fighting, Yasuda fatally shoots Dr. Kim and grazes Gray. A distraught Louise runs out into the line of fire and is killed. The Japanese are defeated when Chen Ta and his men arrive on horseback. He promises to return for Siu Mei after the invaders have been driven out of their country. As the air raids begin again, the two doctors stoically face the next air raid together.

The mountain village in China Sky, on the "40 Acres" RKO back lot; in background is the "House of Mercy" American hospital

== Cast ==
As appearing in China Sky, (main roles and screen credits identified):

- Randolph Scott as Dr. Gray Thompson
- Ruth Warrick as Dr. Sara Durand
- Ellen Drew as Louise Thompson
- Anthony Quinn as Chen-Ta
- Carol Thurston as Siu-Mei
- Richard Loo as Col. Yasuda (Japanese: 陸軍大佐安田, Rikugun-Taisa Yasuda)
- Ducky Louie as Little Goat
- Philip Ahn as Dr. Kim
- Benson Fong as Chung
- H.T. Tsiang as Magistrate
- Chin Kuang Chow as Little Charlie

== Production ==
Although Pearl Buck's novel had been optioned for film production in 1941, one nagging plotline held up actual work as screenwriters dealt with an unsympathetic anti-American Chinese character. Phillip Ahn's character was ultimately changed from the American schooled Chinese Dr. Chung to a half Korean and half Japanese character. His name, Kim Han Soo may have been inspired by real life Korean agent, Killsoo Han. During its lengthy and troubled rewrite as a succession of screenwriters, directors and production staff were assigned to the project, the studio considered a number of stars for feature roles including Claudette Colbert, Luise Rainer, Margo, Maureen O'Hara, Kim Hunter and Paul Henreid. The key role of the Japanese antagonist was played by Richard Loo whose Hollywood career in the war was accentuated by a large repertoire of sinister spies, enemy agents and military officers. (Note: Richard Loo's wife, Betty, a well known Hollywood agent was contracted to act as a production assistant and consultant on Chinese culture.)

The RKO Pictures backlot China set over the years was used as a locale in a number of films and television series. It was originally part of the Jerusalem city for Cecil B. DeMille's The King of Kings (1927) and was also redressed and featured as an Arab village in David O. Selznick's The Garden of Allah (1936). In 1945, the set was dressed for China Sky.

== Reception ==
Released at the end of World War II, China Sky did represent an attempt to portray the Chinese theatre of operations, but despite the game efforts of its stars, was relegated to "B" fare by its low production values. Its star, Randolph Scott, called it "disappointing." Bosley Crowther, reviewer for The New York Times considered the film a tepid marital melodrama. "The Chinese characters are the typical, self-effacing types to be found on the screen and who probably would be looked upon as curios in Chungking. RKO undoubtedly meant well in producing this film as an expression of American friendship for China, but it seems to us that this is a case where 10,000 words would have been better than one picture." In an early screening in 1944, Variety characterized the film as a less than "spectacular" production bogged down by a plotline that lacks action elements, as "stress is laid on interior sets and romantic conflict".
