= East Wind: West Wind =

1930 novel by Pearl S. Buck

- 1932 edition
- Author: Pearl S. Buck
- Language: English
- Publisher: John Day Company
- Publication date: 1930
- Publication place: United States
- Media type: Print
- Pages: 277 pp
- OCLC: 27937522
- Dewey Decimal: 813/.52 20
- LC Class: PS3503.U198 E2 1993
- Followed by: The Good Earth

East Wind: West Wind is a novel by Pearl S. Buck published in 1930, her first. It focuses on a Chinese woman, Kwei-lan, and the changes that she and her family undergo.

== Plot summary ==
Kwei-lan is put into an arranged marriage, but her husband is not what she expects. They do not live in her parents' courts (which was expected in China then). He is a medical doctor and does not seem to take interest in her until after she asks him to unbind her feet. After they bond, they have a son together.

Kwei-lan has an older brother who has been living in the United States for a few years. He has a friend write back to his family that he has married an American woman (his parents have already selected a Chinese woman for him to marry when he returns to China).

Kwei-lan's brother and his wife Mary go to China to see if they can convince his family to accept her. The family will not accept her, and tell him to give her money and send her back to America. Kwei-lan's brother has not fulfilled his duty in his parents' eyes, and soon his wife Mary is pregnant with their first child.

The climax is when Kwei-lan's mother dies, and the family tells Kwei-lan's brother that if he does not send Mary back to America and marry his betrothed, then he will be disinherited. He refuses, leaves his family's courts for good, and lives in an apartment near to Kwei-lan's house. The baby is born, and ties together his parents' hearts (and two cultures).
