= Sidney Wagner (cinematographer) =

American cinematographer

- Born: Sidney Chapman Wagner; January 13, 1901; Los Angeles, California, U.S.
- Died: July 7, 1947 (aged 46); Hollywood, California, U.S.
- Occupation: Cinematographer
- Spouse: Marie Wagner
- Children: 1

Sidney Chapman Wagner (January 13, 1901 – April 7, 1947) was an American cinematographer. He was nominated for two Academy Awards in the category Best Cinematography for the films Northwest Passage and Dragon Seed.

Wagner died suddenly in April 1947 in Hollywood, California, at the age of 47. He was buried in Forest Lawn Memorial Park.

== Selected filmography ==
- Northwest Passage (1940; co-nominated with William V. Skall)
- Dragon Seed (1944)
- The Postman Always Rings Twice (1946)
