= Edgar Sydenstricker =

American economist and statistician

Edgar Sydenstricker (15 July 1881 – 19 March 1936) was an American economist and statistician.

Sydenstricker was born on 15 July 1881 in Shanghai to missionaries Caroline Maude (Stulting) (1857–1921) and Absalom Sydenstricker. His parents returned to their home state of West Virginia for the birth of his younger sister Pearl S. Buck. Sydenstricker came to the United States in 1896. He enrolled at Fredericksburg College and later Washington and Lee University, where he was elected to Phi Beta Kappa. Sydenstricker completed a master's of art degree at Washington and Lee in 1902. For further graduate study, Sydenstricker enrolled at the University of Chicago and Johns Hopkins University.

He was a high school principal in Onancock, Virginia until 1905, when he became editor of the Daily Advance, a newspaper in Lynchburg, Virginia. Sydenstricker also wrote for other publications. Between 1907 and 1908, Sydenstricker was a fellow in political economy at the University of Chicago, after which he worked for the United States Immigration Commission and the Commission on Industrial Relations until 1915. Sydenstricker joined the United States Public Health Service in 1915 to work with Benjamin S. Warren. Together, they researched the health and economic status of textile factory workers in New York City, as well as sickness insurance in Europe. From 1916 to 1918, Sydenstricker and Joseph Goldberger researched causes of pellagra in the American South. Sydenstricker and Wade Hampton Frost began in 1918 to research influenza with a statistical focus. Sydenstricker was named head of the Office of Statistical Investigations in 1920, and began the Hagerstown Morbidity Survey the next year. It later became the U. S. National Health Survey. In 1923, the League of Nations invited Sydenstricker to establish the Epidemiological Service of the Health Organization, which ran similar public health studies on an international scale.

Sydenstricker became a consultant to the Milbank Memorial Fund in 1925. As he took on more extensive leadership roles within the organization, including as director of research in 1928 and scientific director in 1935, Sydenstricker's reduced his responsibilities at the Public Health Service to consultancy work. He served in several positions within the American Statistical Association, among them counsellor, member of the board of directors, and associate editor. Sydenstricker was elected a member of the ASA in 1917, and became a fellow in 1922. He also represented the association on Social Science Research Council between 1931 and 1934. He died on March 19, 1936, aged 54, of a cerebral hemorrhage.
