= Fighting Angel =

Pearl S. Buck 1936 memoir of her father

First edition (publ. Reynal & Hitchcock)

Fighting Angel: Portrait of a Soul (1936) is a memoir, sometimes called a "creative non-fiction novel," written by Pearl S. Buck about her father, Absalom Sydenstricker (1852–1931) as a companion to her memoir of her mother, The Exile.

The book is a conflicted portrait of her father written in 1936 to take advantage of the success of The Exile but also to tell a different part of her parents’ story. “Andrew,” the name she uses for her father in the book, had a “swordlike singleness of heart,” for the early missionaries, she wrote, were “born warriors and very great men” who were “proud and quarrelsome and brave and intolerant and passionate.” He dedicated himself to “the Work,” as he called it, but a lifetime of evangelizing produced few converts and at the cost of scarcely recognizing the existence of his wife or family and of failing to understand China. Though her father professed not to know what the word “imperialism” meant, Buck sees his mission as part of the “astounding imperialisms of the West.” Buck later remarked that reading Herman Melville’s Moby Dick saved her soul, and perhaps she saw something of her father in Captain Ahab, a figure also bent on a mission.

In awarding Buck the 1938 Nobel Prize in Literature, the Nobel Committee cited these two memoirs of her parents. They found, however, a “flaw” in The Exile: “The daughter's devotion to her mother makes it impossible for her to do justice to her father.” But the Committee felt Buck redeemed herself in Fighting Angel: while the “portrait conceals none of his repellent features,” his daughter “maintained pure reverence before the nobility of the whole.

== Reading ==
- Buck, Pearl S (2009) [1936], Fighting Angel: Portrait of a Soul, Charles W Hayford, intr., Norwalk, CT: EastBridge; reprinted, Camphor Press.
- Hayford, Charles W (2009), "Introduction", The Exile: Portrait of an American Mother, Norwalk, CT: EastBridge, ISBN 978-1-59988-005-1.
- Buck, Pearl S. (1936). Fighting angel; portrait of a soul. New York: Reynal & Hitchcock.; reprinted, Camphor Press.
