= Anchee Min =

Chinese-American author

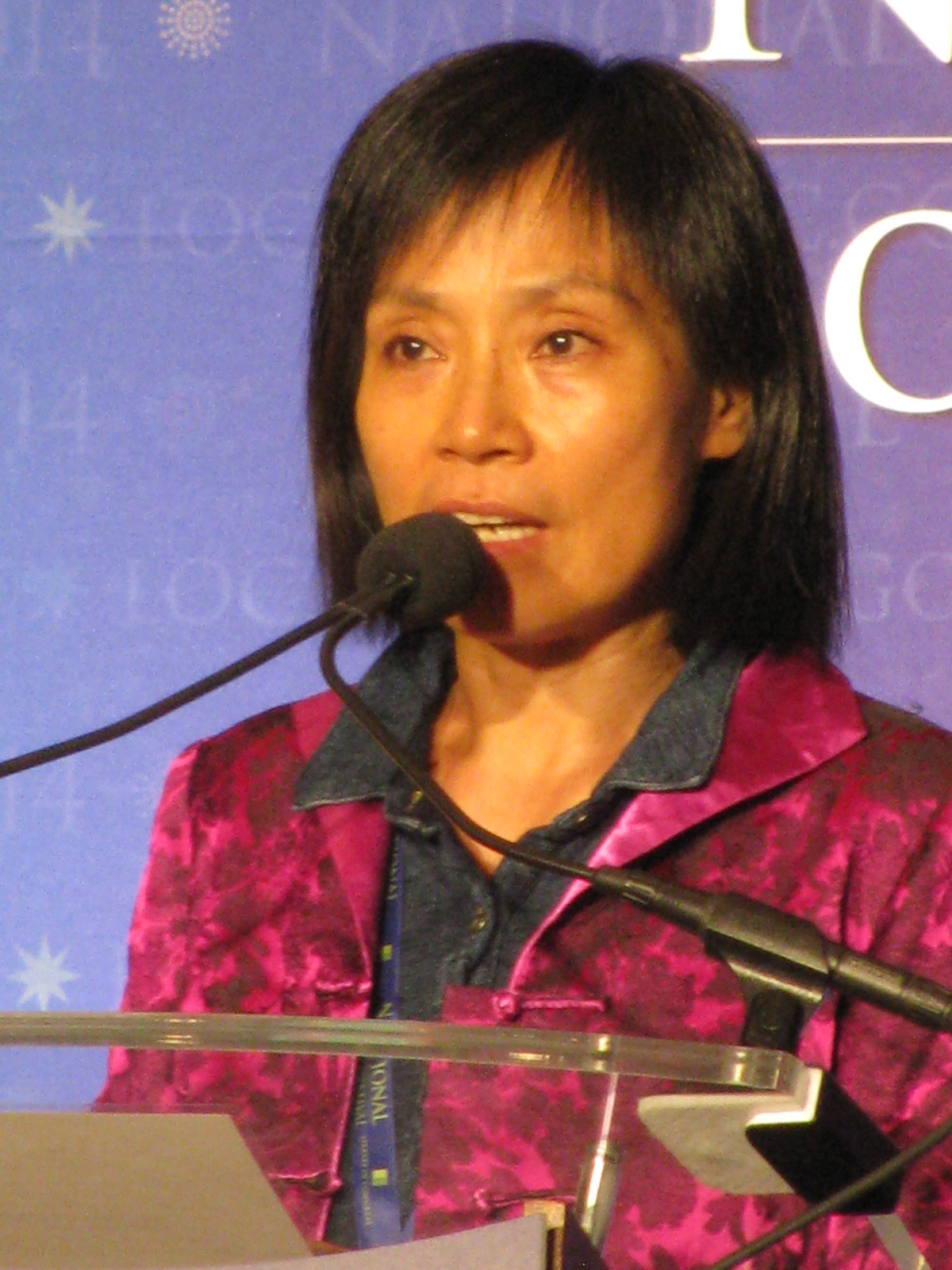
- Born: January 14, 1957 (age 69); Shanghai, China
- Citizenship: American
- Education: School of the Art Institute of Chicago
- Occupation: Author
- Spouses: Qigu Jiang (divorced); Lloyd Lofthouse (m. 1999; div. 2015)
- Children: 1

Chinese name
- Simplified Chinese: 闵安琪
- Traditional Chinese: 閔安琪
Transcriptions
Standard Mandarin
- Hanyu Pinyin: Mín Ānqí
- Website: ancheemin.com

Anchee Min (simplified Chinese: 闵安琪; traditional Chinese: 閔安琪; pinyin: Mǐn Ānqí; born January 14, 1957) is a Chinese-American author who lives in San Francisco and Shanghai. Min has published two memoirs, Red Azalea and The Cooked Seed: A Memoir, and six historical novels. Her fiction emphasizes strong female characters, such as Jiang Qing, the wife of chairman Mao Zedong, and Empress Dowager Cixi, the last ruling empress of China.

== Life ==
Min was born in Shanghai, China, on January 14, 1957. Her parents were both teachers. She was nine years old when the Cultural Revolution began. As a child, she was a member of the Little Red Guards and was made to report her favorite teacher, who was accused of being an anti-Maoist, to the authorities.

When Min was 17, she was sent to a collective farm near the East China Sea, where she endured horrific conditions and worked 18-hour days. Eventually, she suffered a spinal cord injury. She began an affair with the commander at her camp, a woman named Yan, although she attributes the affair largely to loneliness.

At the collective farm, Min was discovered by a team of talent scouts from the Shanghai Film Studio and was selected to become an actress for her ideal "proletarian good looks." She eventually won the lead role in a propaganda film inspired by Madame Mao. However, the film was never completed. After Mao Zedong's death and the subsequent downfall of Jiang Qing, Min was ostracized and treated badly. She was depressed and considered suicide. With the assistance of her friend, actress Joan Chen, and the sponsorship of her aunt living in Singapore, Min obtained a passport and applied to the School of the Art Institute of Chicago. She then emigrated to the United States. As she was initially entering the country, she was nearly deported when it was discovered that, contrary to what she had put on her visa application, she did not speak English. However, she was able to convince the immigration officer to allow her to enter into the country.

After moving to the US, Min worked five jobs at the same time and learned English by, among others, watching Sesame Street.

Min is openly bisexual. Her first husband was a Chinese artist named Qigu Jiang. They had a daughter, Lauryann, who attended Stanford University. According to Min herself, she "lured [Qigu] into marriage, making herself pregnant by him although she knew he did not want a child" and subsequently their marriage fell apart.

In 1999, Min married teacher and writer Lloyd Lofthouse. She filed for divorce in 2014, and it was finalized in 2015.

Min graduated from the School of the Art Institute of Chicago with a B.F.A. and M.F.A. in Fine Arts.

== Bibliography ==
=== Memoirs ===
- Red Azalea (Pantheon Books, 1994, ISBN 9780679423324; a New York Times Notable Book); Random House Digital, Inc., 2011, ISBN 9780307781024
- The Cooked Seed: A Memoir. Bloomsbury USA, May 7, 2013, ISBN 978-1-59691-698-2

=== Fiction ===
- Katherine Hamish Hamilton, 1995, ISBN 978-0-241-13541-9
- Becoming Madame Mao (Boston, Mass.: Houghton Mifflin. ISBN 0-618-12700-3.). Based on the life of Jiang Qing, the last wife of Mao Zedong.
- Wild Ginger: A Novel. Houghton Mifflin Harcourt. January 1, 2004. ISBN 978-0-547-34937-4.
- Empress Orchid Bloomsbury Publishing Incorporated, 2004, ISBN 9780747566984
- The Last Empress (Bloomsbury Publishing Plc, 2007, ISBN 9780747578505). Based on the life of Empress Dowager Cixi, the late 19th and early 20th century Qing dynasty Empress Dowager.
- Pearl of China: A Novel. Bloomsbury Publishing, April 9, 2010, ISBN 978-1-60819-151-2. Inspired by the life of Pearl S. Buck as a girl and young woman in China.
