= The Cooked Seed =

Memoir by Anchee Min

The Cooked Seed: A Memoir is a memoir by Anchee Min, published in 2013. It describes her initial years in the United States, when she attended university and learned English as a second language.

The title refers to a saying in Chinese about a person who had no more potential to grow; in China she felt that she had no opportunity to succeed. Joan Chen suggested to her that she come to the United States, and Min takes this offer.

Donna Rifkind of The New York Times wrote that the immigration story of Min is particular to the author's era while also having similarities to other immigrant stories.

== Reception ==
Kirkus Reviews described the memoir as "uplifting", and that some of the more difficult moments are described in "dry, grim" ways.

Helena De Bertodano of The Daily Telegraph stated that The Cooked Seed became "acclaimed".

Publishers Weekly gave the book a starred review, describing it as "captivatingly" and "poignantly"; it stated that her criticisms of the United States were done "candidly".
