= The Last Empress (novel) =

Novel by Anchee Min

- First edition
- Author: Anchee Min
- Cover artist: Lei Q Min
- Language: English
- Genre: Historical novel
- Publisher: Houghton Mifflin
- English publication date: March 21, 2007
- Media type: Print (Hardback & Paperback)
- ISBN: 978-0-618-53146-2
- OCLC: 71348717
- Dewey Decimal: 813/.54 22
- LC Class: PS3563.I4614 L37 2007
- Preceded by: Empress Orchid

The Last Empress is a historical novel by Anchee Min that provides a sympathetic account of the life of Empress Dowager Cixi (referred to as Empress Orchid), from her rise to power as Empress Tzu-Hsi, until her death at 72 years of age. Akin to the bestselling and preceding novel in the series Empress Orchid, names within the story are different in spelling but retain the same pronunciation - allowing the reader to identify each relevant character to his or her real life counterpart.

== Plot summary ==
The story begins with the death of Orchid's mother. Empress Orchid's son Tung Chih is also beginning to hate her, much to her despair.

In 1849, the Selection of Imperial begins for him is completed. The chosen Empress is a "cat-eyed, eighteen-year-old beauty" called Alute. Orchid's preferred selection for Empress was the daughter of a provincial governor named Foo-cha. It was only due to Empress Nuharoo's rank as the higher wife that Alute was chosen.

The Selection of Imperial is followed by the suspicious death of Orchid's close friend and eunuch An-te-hai. His death had a great emotional impact on Empress Orchid.

Around one year later, tension begins to mount between Orchid and Alute. Orchid becomes irritated at Alute's lack of co-operation, and is further annoyed with Alute's rude attitude towards her. Her annoyance soon turns to happiness when Alute claims that she is pregnant with Tung Chih's first child. Tung Chih's illness worsens and in 1875 he dies with his mother beside him. Empress Orchid refuses to give up her power, as she believes that Alute only sees the "glamour and glory" of being an Empress. As well as this, she also believes that Alute has little experience with political and court matters – thus rendering her unsuitable for the role as Empress of China.

Orchid also realises that Alute may have been mentally disturbed. Yet these possibilities had no effect on foreign journals describing Orchid as a violent character who contributed to the death of her son – whilst portraying Alute as the protagonist of the event. Many foreign reports and articles soon begin printing false reports of Orchid's actions as ruler of China, suggesting that she is solely responsible for China's decline due to her cruel regime. However, such stories are seemingly published only to justify further invasions of China.

After the death of Tung Chih and Alute, Orchid adopts her sister Rong's son Tsai-t'ien. Orchid then renames her nephew Guang-hsu upon his succession to the Dragon Throne. Initially, Orchid felt no motherly love for her nephew as she only adopted him to prevent his death at Rong's hand. However, a mother-son bond eventually forms between the two.

Shortly after the appointment of Guang-hsu as Orchid's successor, her love Yung Lu announces that he is planning to marry and move away to faraway Sinkiang. Soon after Orchid realises that she is no longer at full health, she receives information that Empress Nuharoo has collapsed from illness. Nuharoo dies, and rumours suggest that Orchid is responsible.

Several years later (after increasing attacks by foreign countries), Orchid and Guang-hsu move to Ying-t'ai. An assassination attempt is made on her life. After Guang-hsu learns of the mistake he made that almost cost Orchid's life, he becomes deeply shamed and loses the will to live. His attempted reform of China also fails, and he too succumbs to illness. Attacks by a rebellion group named the Boxers soon force Orchid, Guang-hsu and their servants to flee. They return to the Forbidden City after the attacks subside.

From this point, Orchid's health deteriorates further. During this time, she meets with Robert Hart, an important contributor to the stability of China's economy. On November 14, 1908, Emperor Guang-hsu dies. Orchid also dies the following day, after appointing her grandnephew Puyi as her successor.

== Bibliography ==
- The Last Empress, Bloomsbury Publishing Plc, 2007, ISBN 978-0-747-57850-5
- The Last Empress: A Novel. Houghton Mifflin Harcourt. April 7, 2008. ISBN 978-0-547-34690-8.
