= Pearl of China =

2010 novel by Anchee Min

Pearl of China: A Novel is a 2010 novel by Anchee Min, published by Bloomsbury.

The fictional narrative involves Pearl Buck becoming friends with a Chinese girl named Willow Yee. The two experience historical events. The climax of the novel involves Jiang Qing asking Willow to criticize Buck, and Willow chooses not to.

MPR News described the work as being "deeply personal" to Min.

Publishers Weekly described Willow as "fiercely loyal".

== Background ==
Min, while she was a student at Shanghai Middle School, was told, in 1971, by the school administration to criticize Pearl Buck, despite Min not knowing anything about Buck and being unable to read translations of Buck's work; the authorities deemed Buck's works to be too dangerous to read. According to Min, it was a plot by Jiang Qing to prevent Buck from having proximity to President of the United States Richard Nixon and Chinese Paramount Leader Mao Zedong. Min re-examined her feelings about Buck, when, while in Chicago in a book signing, a person who read one or more of Min's works described Buck giving her positive feelings about the Chinese people. Min decided to read The Good Earth while flying on an aircraft and felt emotional resonance after reading it.

Min traveled to Zhenjiang, Jiangsu, where Buck once lived, to do research. According to her, the residents kept mum until people told her to visit a pastor who told her second-hand stories about Buck; the pastor himself did not know Buck. The pastor was on the verge of death when he met Min.

== Reception ==
Jan Stuart of The New York Times argued that the initial sections read well, but criticized "wide-eyed story telling" and the "melodramatic reversals of fortune and 11th-hour rescues" that occur after the Boxer Rebellion begins in the novel. Stuart compared sequences in this novel to those in the Perils of Pauline series.

Publishers Weekly stated that some sections seem like a "treatment", and that the work "is curiously low-key".

Kirkus Reviews criticized the work as being a "flat, hagiographic narrative"; in particular the review criticized the use of Willow, stating that the character's purpose seems to be narrating Buck's journey and that Willow "isn’t fleshed out". According to Kirkus, the work "loses steam" after the Boxer Rebellion occurs.
