= Empress Orchid =

2004 novel by Anchee Min

- First edition (UK)
- Author: Anchee Min
- Language: English
- Genre: Historical novel
- Publisher: Bloomsbury (UK); Houghton Mifflin (US)
- Publication date: 2004
- Media type: Print (Hardback & Paperback)
- ISBN: 0-7475-7613-0
- OCLC: 60480601
- Followed by: The Last Empress

Empress Orchid (2004) is a novel by Anchee Min which was first published in Great Britain in 2004. It is written in first person and is a sympathetic account of the life of Empress Dowager Cixi (spelled "Tzu Hsi" in the novel) - from her humble beginnings to her rise as the Empress Dowager.

Names within the story are different in spelling but retain the same pronunciation - allowing the reader to identify each relevant character to his or her real life counterpart.

Empress Orchid was also a 2006 nominee for the Richard and Judy Best Read of the Year Award.

== Background ==
Min read documents about Cixi as part of her research.

== Plot summary ==
The novel follows the life of a young Manchu girl named Orchid Yehonala. The story begins with the death of her father who was once a governor of Wuhu. His death left Orchid, her two siblings and her mother in poverty. His family travel to his birthplace Peking with his coffin for burial. Once in Peking, they move in with a distant uncle and his intellectually disabled and opium addicted son Ping (also known as 'Bottle').

Orchid gets a chance to better her life when Emperor Hsien Feng issues a decree stating that he is looking for "future mates". Orchid is eligible because she is Manchu and that her father was the rank of "Blue Bannerman". She is chosen as the Imperial consort of the fourth rank. Her official title is Lady of the Greatest Virtue. There are a total of 7 Imperial consorts, and over 3000 concubines within the Forbidden City. Nuharoo is pronounced Empress, ranking her first out of the 7 Imperial consorts.

Once in the Forbidden City, Orchid befriends a eunuch called An-te-hai, who is assigned as her servant along with numerous other eunuchs and maids. A friendship begins to form between the two, and she appoints him as her first attendant.

As the months pass, Orchid becomes more desperate. The official duty of an Imperial consort is to sleep with the Emperor and produce male heirs, but Orchid has yet to be summoned. Without completing that duty, an Imperial consort risks being unacknowledged for the remainder of her life. Knowing this, Orchid decides to bribe Chief Eunuch Shim in order to gain Emperor Hsien Feng's attention. Her tactic works and she soon becomes the Emperor's favourite consort. During her time as the favourite, Orchid learns more about the current history of China, and the inner workings of the Forbidden City.

Later on within the story, Orchid becomes pregnant. She gives birth to the Emperor's first male heir Tung Chih amidst nationwide celebration. However, after the birth of his son Emperor Hsien Feng begins to lose interest in Orchid. Part of this is due to Nuharoo's plot to disrupt Orchid's life.

The emperor becomes ill as political situations in China worsen. Foreign powers are beginning to invade China, demanding that the emperor grants them the right to establish trade and ports. The weak emperor is unable to defend his empire from the combined strength of the intruding forces and the royal family flees the capital when the enemies approach Peking.

Emperor Hsien Feng dies whilst in exile. Nonetheless, Orchid's life is still in danger from Su Shun (a corrupt official) as the Emperor has not yet named an heir. Later on in the novel Orchid persuades Hsien Feng to name Tung Chih as the new Emperor, with herself and Nuharoo as co-regents. Su Shun is named as the head of the Board of Regents. As Su Shun had previously expected to gain more power from the death of Hsien Feng without Orchid's interference, tensions between the two increase.

Orchid is now granted the title "Empress of Holy Kindness Tzu Hsi". Nuharoo becomes the "Empress of Great Benevolence Tzu An". Orchid knows that her new position does not guarantee her safety as she is still restricted by the actions of Su Shun. With the assistance of An-te-hai and Prince Kung Orchid manages to successfully arrest and punish Su Shun and his associates, on the grounds that they had tried to organise a coup d'état.

The novel ends with the official burial of Emperor Hsien Feng and the hint of a new relationship between Orchid and General Yung Lu.

== Reception ==
Judy Budz, who worked at Fitchburg State College as a professor teaching English, stated that the work had "pained if awkward voice" and that readers are happy to see Cixi advance in the plot; according to Budz, the story sometimes feels slow due to "scaffolding of research".

John Hartl of The New York Times described this book as "absorbing" and that it successfully illustrates how Tzu Hsi attained power; according to Hartl, the narrative was sometimes done in a "clunky" way.

== Bibliography ==
- Empress Orchid, Bloomsbury Publishing Incorporated, 2004, ISBN 9780747566984
- Empress Orchid. Houghton Mifflin Harcourt. April 11, 2005. ISBN 978-0-547-34720-2.
