= Becoming Madame Mao =

Novel by Anchee Min

- Author: Anchee Min
- Language: English
- Genre: Novel
- Publisher: Houghton Mifflin
- Publication date: 2000
- ISBN: 0-618-12700-3

Becoming Madame Mao is a historical novel by Anchee Min detailing the life of Jiang Qing (spelled in the novel as "Jiang Ching"). She became Madame Mao after her marriage to Mao Zedong. In this story Min tries to cast a sympathetic light on one of the most controversial political figures in the People's Republic of China.

== Plot summary ==
The novel starts with the main character's suicide, before moving on to her early childhood.

Madame Mao is born to a very poor family around 1910 (early enough to have had her feet bound although due to a severe infection the bindings were taken off). She has an abusive father who kicks her and her concubine mother out of the house at an early age. Her mother ends up as a concubine and servant and the young 'Madame Mao' runs away to her grandparents. Anchee Min, the author, seems to attribute a lot of Madame Mao's later actions to her childhood—and that a lot of her incessant claims to power actually come from a need to be desired and to feel close to Mao rather than a deep need for power herself. Madame Mao's dream is to become an actress but she only achieves mediocre success. Using the stage name Lan Ping, she spends a few years in Shandong province (where she becomes a Communist due to a lover of hers) and then Shanghai. In Shanghai she had some success in playing Nora in Henrik Ibsen's A Doll's House, and the author clearly parallels Nora's strength and inability to be controlled with Lan Ping's strong personality and need to be in control and the center of attention. The play is closed down since it is perceived to be too subversive by the authorities. She even ends up in prison for a short time but is released after signing a document denouncing Communism. After what seems like a string of rejections as well as a few serious lovers and two husbands, she travels to Yan'an, Mao's revolutionary base, to become part of his movement. The book does not offer much explanation for the switch from actress to countryside revolutionary except that she certainly had been involved in revolutionary elements (anti-Japanese plays, etc.) and that with the absence of work as an actress she did not have many options. Also, joining the Communist revolution seemed to be a common choice for young discontented students and others in their 20s.

In Yan'an, she soon meets Mao as the leading actress in patriotic plays. They meet frequently and finally become lovers. Mao is still married to his second wife He Zizhen (his first died as a revolutionary), who is in Russia and mentally unstable, but by the time she returns to China, Mao and Lan Ping have married and she is put in a mental hospital. The Communist Party is very much against Mao's affair with Lan Ping, in large part because they have worked hard to build up the image of his second wife as a martyr for the cause and do not want Mao's image to be tarnished in any way as an adulterer. The Party is supposed to emphasize discipline and unity. The affair continues despite (or perhaps is enhanced because of) these odds and the disapproval of many Communists. Finally, Lan becomes pregnant and Mao is allowed to divorce He Zizhen and marry her, under the condition that she stay out of the public eye and is not involved in politics at all. Her name is changed to Jiang Qing.

During the years before Communists gain full control of mainland China, the relationship seems to go well, although the passion is reduced. Jiang follows Mao everywhere, even to the field, and becomes his secretary when he is sick.

However, Jiang Ching has never lost her ambition to be powerful and loved and noticed. She sees a glimmer of opportunity at Mao's low point—two years after the launch of the Great Leap Forward which proved disastrous. She begins slowly to reemerge from the shadows and spends some time in Shanghai building up a network of actors and producers (her great passion is still opera and theater). Finally, she approaches Mao to reveal that a current popular play is actually subversive against the emperor. She feeds on his paranoia that those closest to him are actually plotting against him. He gives her some permission to carry on her activities and develop some propagandist plays that exalt him. Slowly she builds up her own friends and aides who can be trusted. Finally, in 1966 she is actually allowed to make an important speech and helps Mao develop the concepts behind the Cultural Revolution. Eventually, Mao puts her in charge of the 'ideology side of the business' and she wields an enormous amount of power.

Madame Mao, as she is now called, organizes festivals for revolutionary plays and begins to work closely with the student movements which have always been so important in China. She organizes and speaks to rallies of thousands of people to help launch the Cultural Revolution. Finally, Mao and Jiang decide to launch a student-led army called the Red Guards that she would be in charge of. The Red Guards end up having more power than the official military for a number of years and wreak havoc throughout the country. Her relationship with Mao is no longer romantic in the least but is mutually beneficial: 'For him, it is the security of his empire that she aids and for her, the role of a heroine. In retrospect she not only has broken the Party's restriction, she runs the nation's psyche. She is gripped by the vision that she might eventually carry on Mao's business and rule China after his death.

As Madame Mao's power grows, so does her worry about Mao and his constantly changing allegiances and worries about betrayals. He emphasizes that the public only trusts her because he is backing her. His dementia and paranoia grows as he ages. At one point Mao invites a bunch of the 'old boy's over for a meeting without inviting her. She says: ' I should have known that my husband was doing the two-faced trick. I should have understood that although Mao had been promoting me, my new power unnerves him and he needs to have another force to balance the game.'

In Mao's final months, Madame Mao is desperate for him to name her as his successor or at the very least to give a definitive statement that she represents him. She desperately wants his power after his death but if that's not possible at the very least she needs protection from all the party members who are ready to attack her. She sends investigators to extract forced confessions from her enemies and becomes increasingly paranoid and power-obsessed herself. She forms a power circle called the Gang of Four with herself as the leader, Zhang Chunqiao (whom she found in Shanghai and gave much power to), Wang Hongwen (whom she found as a student and Mao promoted to Vice Chairman of the Communist party) and another disciple, Yao Wenyuan.

In September 1976, Mao dies at the age of 83. When Mao's will is eventually found, he has named Hua Guofeng, a provincial governor from his home province, as his successor. Madame Mao had quickly sensed that her enemies would triumph—at Mao's funeral she was barely acknowledged. A few weeks after Mao's death she is arrested.

Madame Mao remains in prison from 1976 to 1991. Her daughter, Li Na, picks up what Madame Mao disliked and dropped what her mother liked or wanted her to do. Madame Mao has "saved enough handkerchiefs and socks to make a rope." She commits suicide by hanging herself on May 14, 1991. She was on Death Row the whole time, although she was not executed since her captors would have preferred to extract a confession of repentance from her.

Sheryl WuDunn of The New York Times stated that the earlier parts of the novel are "seems mostly embroidered history" instead of being completely made up, and that later events focus on Jiang Ching and have less focus on outside events like the Great Leap Forward.

== Reception ==
According to WuDunn the writing is "simple, searing, poetic and also at times overdramatic".

Publishers Weekly stated that it is a "spellbinding", "highly dramatic, psychologically penetrating and provocative narrative" that is "foremost a character study" of Jiang Ching. According to PW, the vignettes were "effective" in telling the story.

Kirkus Reviews stated that the novel, despite the author's skill in creating "A remarkable act of historical imagination", "never truly captures Jiang Ching’s character."
