= Dragon Seed (novel) =

1942 book by Pearl Buck

- First edition
- Author: Pearl S. Buck
- Language: English
- Genre: Historical novel
- Publisher: John Day
- Publication date: January 1942
- Publication place: United States
- Media type: Print (hardback, paperback, audiobook & ebook)
- Pages: 378
- ISBN: 978-1-55921-033-1
- Preceded by: China Sky
- Followed by: The Promise

Dragon Seed: A Novel of China Today is a novel by Pearl S. Buck first published in 1942.

It describes the lives of Chinese peasants in a village outside Nanjing, China, immediately prior to and during the Japanese invasion in 1937. Some characters seek protection in the city, while others become collaborators. This story focuses less on the details of the attack and more on the characters’ reactions to the events in Nanking. The Nanking Massacre (commonly called the Rape of Nanking) involved months of horrific violence by the Imperial Japanese Army as they conquered the city; the novel takes place during these events. Buck opines in the novel that Japanese troops passing through China feel no responsibility for their conduct, as they will not be present to be confronted after the violence is over.

Unlike Buck's earlier novel The Good Earth, Dragon Seed is entirely fictional and based on her own secondhand thoughts rather than personal experience.

The novel was included in Life magazine's list of the 100 outstanding books of 1924–1944.

In 1944, Dragon Seed was released by Metro-Goldwyn-Mayer as a film starring Katharine Hepburn, Turhan Bey, Walter Huston and Aline MacMahon.
