= The Exile (Buck book) =

Pearl Buck 1936 memoir of her mother

First edition (publ. John Day)

The Exile (New York: John Day, 1936) is a memoir/biography, or work of creative non-fiction, written by Pearl S. Buck about her mother, Caroline Stulting Sydenstricker (1857–1921), describing her life growing up in West Virginia and life in China as the wife of the Presbyterian missionary Absalom Sydenstricker. The book is deeply critical of her father and the mission work in China for their treatment of women. Buck also traces the arc of her mother's disillusionment with religion. The success of the book led Buck to write a parallel memoir of her father, Fighting Angel, New York: John Day, 1936.

Although the book was not published until 1936, Buck wrote a draft just after her mother died in 1920, then stashed the manuscript in the wall so that her future children might know their grandmother. “Carie,” as she calls her mother in the book, went to China in hopes that God would speak to her if she made the sacrifice of becoming a missionary, but soon found she had exiled herself from her American home and family. When the deaths of three of her children in China made her sacrifice seem meaningless, she exiled herself also from the traditional patriarchal God of her parents and finally even from her husband. In Buck's description, Carie built a succession of homes for her children and bestowed charity on neighbors and strangers even as she offered unbending moral judgment on her family. “Carie’s daughter,” as Pearl called herself, determined never to make her mother's mistake of subordinating herself to either a man or to a zealous creed.

In awarding Buck the 1938 Nobel Prize in Literature, the Nobel Committee cited these two memoirs of her parents. They found, however, a “flaw” in The Exile: “The daughter's devotion to her mother makes it impossible for her to do justice to her father.” But the Committee felt Buck redeemed herself in Fighting Angel: while the “portrait conceals none of his repellent features,” his daughter “maintained pure reverence before the nobility of the whole.

== Reading ==
- Buck, Pearl S (2009) [1936], The Exile: Portrait of an American Mother, Charles W. Hayford, intr, Norwalk, CT: EastBridge, ISBN 978-1-59988-005-1, originally New York: John Day.
- Hayford, Charles W (2009), "Introduction", The Exile: Portrait of an American Mother, Norwalk, CT: EastBridge, ISBN 978-1-59988-005-1.
- Spurling, Hilary (2010), Burying the Bones: Pearl Buck in China, London: Profile.
