= China Sky =

1941 novel by Pearl S. Buck

- 1942 edition
- Author: Pearl S. Buck
- Language: English
- Genre: Historical
- Publisher: John Day Company
- Publication date: 1941
- Publication place: United States
- Media type: Print (hardback & paperback)

China Sky is a novel by American writer Pearl S. Buck published in 1941. The story centers on love, honor, and wartime treachery in an American-run hospital in the fictional town of Chen-li, China, during the Japanese invasion. The book was the basis of a 1945 film of the same name starring Randolph Scott, Ruth Warrick, Ellen Drew, and Anthony Quinn.

== Plot summary ==
Dr. Gray Thomison is the resident doctor in charge of a hospital in Chen-li, China. Dr. Sara Durand is an American in charge of the women's ward and is secretly in love with Dr. Thomison. They are committed to helping their patients, and they admire the Chinese people and their culture.

During an air raid. Dr. Durand and Siu-mei, a young Chinese intern, evacuate patients and babies from the women's hospital. Sara is in charge of the hospital while Gray is away fund-raising in America. Dr. Durand stays in the women's ward with the terminal patients and those who cannot be moved, while Dr. Chung, a young Chinese doctor just out of American medical school, tends patients in the men's ward.

Dr. Thomison brings his new wife, Louise, to Chen-li. She does not enjoy living in China and considers herself superior to the native Chinese, preferring the company of English-speaking men from nearby Treaty Port, including Harry Delafield, an English businessman.

Chen-ta, the leader of the local guerrillas, brings Yasuda, an injured Japanese prisoner, to the hospital and asks Dr. Durand to operate on him. Dr. Chung assists and gives blood for Yasuda. Dr. Chung believes the Japanese will win the war, so he makes friends with Yasuda and enlists his younger brother, Chung Third, to join Chen-ta's guerrillas to gather information for the Japanese. Chung convinces Louise to assist him, which leads to her loyalty being questioned by others in the hospital. Through her intervention, the Japanese stop bombing the hospital. The citizens of Chen-li stop coming to the hospital because it is not suffering the same fate as the rest of the town.

Chung impregnates one of the nurses, Ya-ching, but ends his relationship with her to pursue Siu-mei, who comes from a wealthy family. Chung gives Yasuda a poison to make him appear sick and unable to be released back to Chen-ta. Ya-ching makes harmless substitute pills and gives them to Yasuda one night, then tells Siu-mei that Chung was poisoning Yasuda and using Chung Third to gather information about the guerrillas. Ya-ching drowns while returning to her own village.

Chen-ta begins to suspect Chung Third of spying, and he also lets Siu-mei's father know that he is interested in his daughter. Siu-mei and her father travel to tell Chen-ta about Dr. Chung's treachery. Chen-ta has Chung Third killed, then he goes to the hospital to collect his prisoner. Yasuda tells Dr. Thomison that Dr. Chung and Louise are passing information to the enemy. Yasuda promises Thomison Japanese support in exchange for safety. Yasuda kills Dr. Chung and throws the body out a window to make it look like suicide. Louise discovers Chung's body. Thomison sends Louise back to America and the Japanese resume bombing the hospital.

== Characters ==
- Sara Durand - 28-year-old American doctor in charge of the women's ward at the hospital in Chen-li.
- Gray Thomison - American doctor who built the hospital in Chen-li and is resident in charge of the hospital.
- Siu-mei (Ling) - young Chinese intern in the women's hospital. Dr. Chung courts her because she is from a wealthy family. Her father, Mr. Ling, does not approve, but does not interfere.
- Dr Chung, Chung Ming-liang or Chung En-liu - a traitorous Chinese doctor, about age 31, just out of American medical school.
- Louise Thomison - Gray Thomison's pretty American wife, a New York socialite.
- Siao Fah - Gray's Chinese cook-boy; "squat, pock-marked"; dedicated to Gray, disdainful of Louise.
- Chen-ta, the Eagle - chief of the Tong Mountain guerrillas, Chinese fighters near Chen-li. He is attracted to Siu-mei when he meets her at the hospital.
- Yasuda - Chen-ta's injured Japanese prisoner, a powerful and well-educated fighter who speaks four languages, including English, but no Chinese.
- Ya-ching - a "pale and pock-marked" nurse who is in love with Dr. Chung until he spurns her and their unborn child.
- Chung Third - Dr Chung's younger brother, who joins Chen-ta's guerrillas to learn their plans and pass this information to Dr. Chung for Yasuda.
- Harry Delafield - an English businessman working in nearby Treaty Port who becomes attached to Louise.
- Mr. Ling - Siu-mei's father, a respected elder in Chen-li who admires Chen-ta.

== Adaptation ==
In 1945, RKO Pictures released a film adaptation of China Sky. It was directed by Ray Enright and featured movie idol Randolph Scott, teamed with Ruth Warrick, Ellen Drew and Anthony Quinn. Although set in wartime China, Quinn and other lead actors portrayed Chinese characters, in keeping with other period films that employed Caucasian actors in Asian roles. Released at the end of World War II, China Sky represented an attempt to portray the Chinese theatre of operations, but was relegated to "B" fare by its low production values. Its star, Randolph Scott, called it "disappointing."
