= Absalom Sydenstricker =

American missionary (1852–1931)

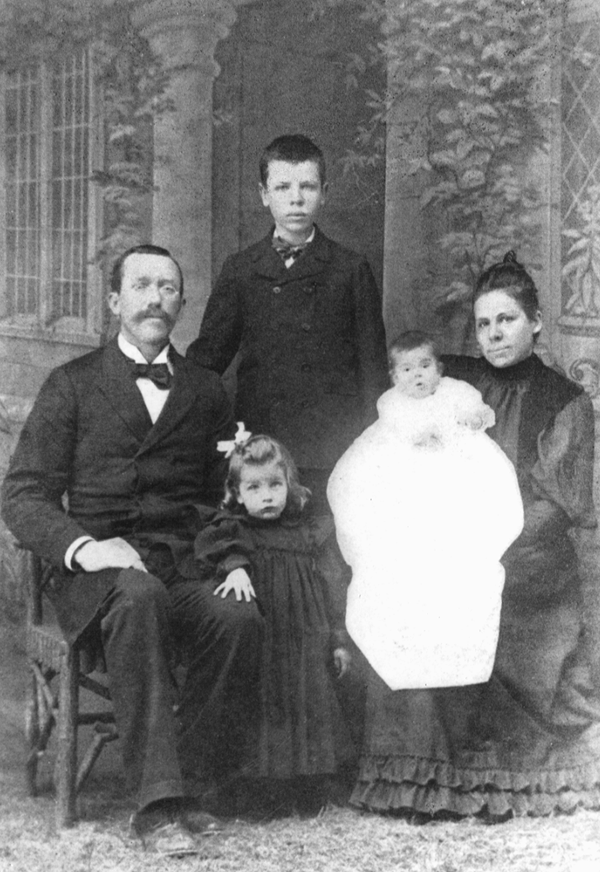

Absalom Andrew Sydenstricker (Chinese: 賽兆祥, 1852–1931) was an American Presbyterian missionary to China from 1880 to 1931. The Sydenstricker log house at what later became the Pearl S. Buck Birthplace in Hillsboro, West Virginia, was Absalom's early childhood home. He was of German descent.

His daughter, Pearl S. Buck, became an award-winning author. The book Fighting Angel, written as a companion to her memoir of her mother, The Exile, recounts the life and work of Absalom (called "Andrew" in the book). Her representation of her father was conflicted between respect for his steadfastness, and bitterness for his treatment of her mother. She wrote that his was

the story... of one soul and its march through time to its appointed end. For this soul there was birth, predestined, a duty to be done and it was done, and there was heaven at the end – that was the whole story. There was nothing of the lives of people in it, no merriment of feasts, no love of joy, no tales of death. ... There was nothing in it of empire or emperors or revolutions or of all the stir of changing human times. There was no reflection upon the minds and manners of men or any subtlety of philosophies. The tale was told as simply as the sun rises out of the dawn, marches swiftly across the firmament, to set in its own glory.

This brief summary of the family life and missionary work of Absalom and Caroline Maude "Carie" (Stulting) Sydenstricker (1857–1921) shows the perseverance, under extreme hardships, of missionaries to China during this time period.

The names of the family members appear in quotes as they are given in the books The Exile and Fighting Angel. Absalom is called "Andrew", Caroline is called "Carie", Pearl is called "Comfort". Names of cities of China are given in the modern Pinyin form, with names used in the books given in parentheses.

The family life and missionary work of Absalom and Caroline (Stulting) Sydenstricker
Date	Event
1880	Absalom "Andrew" and Caroline "Carie" married. Sail for China. Land in Shanghai.
1880–83	Divide time between Hangzhou (Hangchow) and Suzhou (Soochow).
1881	Son Edgar "Edwin" born.
1883	Family moves to Zhenjiang (Chinkiang, Tsingkiang) Jiangsu Province. Absalom travels throughout Jiangsu Province (Kiangsu).
1884	Daughter "Maude" born (b. 1884 d. 1884)
1886	Daughter "Edith" born.
1884?	Live briefly in Yantai (Chefoo), Shandong Province. Caroline recovers from Tuberculosis.
1888	Son "Arthur" born.
1887	Family transfers to T'sinkiang-p'u (now the main district of Huai'an, Jiangsu Province), a small city more than 100 miles north of Zhenjiang.
1887–	Absalom publishes a series of articles on oral and written Chinese in the Chinese Recorder.
1890	"Arthur" and "Edith" die within a month. Cholera epidemic in Shanghai. "Arthur" (b. 1888 d. 1890). "Edith" (b. 1886 d. 1890). Buried Shanghai (with "Maude").
1891–92	Family on furlough in USA.
1892	Daughter Pearl "Comfort" born (b. 1892 d. 1973)
1892	Family returns to Ts'inkiang-p'u (now the main district of Huai'an, Jiangsu Province).
1893	Caroline contracts dysentery. Son "Clyde" born (b. 1893 d. 1899)
1894?	Absalom begins Chinese New Testament translation, from Greek New Testament. Translated to vernacular of the common people. Several editions published until Absalom's death.
1896–21	Family lives in Zhenjiang. Absalom travels, establishing churches.
1897	Absalom bought a 1727 square meters of land in Kuling, Mount Lu, Jiujiang. Land number is 86A. He later built a small stone villa on it. The villa is now called Villa 310, on Middle Fourth Road. The villa is 140 square meters, with a red roof, an open porch and a traditional tiger window. He took his family there every summer for the next two decades. It was on Mount Lu during annual summer pilgrimage, Absalom's daughter Pearl decided to become a writer.
1898–1901	Boxer Rebellion.
1899	"Clyde" dies. Buried Zhenjiang. Pearl sick (Diphtheria?) and survives.
1900	Daughter Grace "Faith" born. Adopted daughter "Precious Cloud."
1901	Family moves to Shanghai temporarily. Absalom stays in Zhenjiang.
1901–2	Family on furlough in USA. Edgar enrolled at Washington and Lee College.
1902	Family (without Edgar) returns to Zhenjiang.
1905	Famine in Yangtze valley – ministry of relief amongst great need.
1910–11	Family on furlough in USA. Travel by way of Russia and Europe. Pearl enrolled at Randolph-Macon Woman's College (1911–14).
1911	Family (without Pearl) returns to Zhenjiang.
1911–12	Revolution. Republic of China declared by Sun-Yatsen. Qing dynasty falls.
1914	Caroline takes ill with "tropical disease." Pearl returns to Zhenjiang.
1915	Caroline recovers mostly.
1917	Pearl married to John Lossing Buck (Zhenjiang).
1920	Absalom and Grace on furlough in USA. Grace enrolled in college. "Carie" stays in China. Absalom returns to Zhenjiang.
1921	Caroline dies. Buried Zhenjiang.
1921	Nanjing. Absalom lives with Pearl and husband; works at Theological Seminary.
1927	"Nanjing Incident." Absalom, Pearl, Grace and families sheltered for 1 day during revolutionary turmoil.
1927	Absalom in Korea. Pearl in Japan.
1928	Absalom returns to Nanjing. Some time later, Pearl returns.
1931	Absalom dies. Buried in Kuling, Mount Lu, Jiujiang.
1934	Pearl leaves China for last time.

== Bibliography ==
- Buck, Pearl S (2009) [1936], Fighting Angel: Portrait of a Soul, D'asia Vu Reprint Library, Norwalk, CT: EastBridge, ISBN 978-1-59988-006-8, originally New York: John Day.
- Buck, Pearl S. The Exile. Portrait of an American Mother (John Day, 1936; rpr. with a new Introduction, Norwalk, CT: EastBridge, D'Asia Vu Reprint Library, 2009 ISBN 978-1-59988-005-1.
- Conn, Peter (1996), Pearl S. Buck: A Cultural Biography, Cambridge: Cambridge University Press, ISBN 9780521560801.
- Hayford, Charles W (2009). "Introduction". The Exile: Portrait of an American Mother. Norwalk, CT: EastBridge. ISBN 978-1-59988-005-1..
- Zetzsche, Jost (2005), "Absalom Sydenstricker", in Lodwick, Kathleen; Kwan, Wah Cheng (eds.), The Missionary Kaleidoscope: Portraits of Six China Missionaries, EastBridge, ISBN 978-1-89193-659-3.
