= Red Azalea =

Novel by Anchee Min

- First UK edition
- Author: Anchee Min
- Language: English
- Genre: Memoir
- Publisher: Victor Gollancz Ltd
- Publication date: 1993
- Publication place: United Kingdom

Red Azalea is a memoir of Chinese American writer Anchee Min (b. 1957). It was written during the first eight years she spent in the United States, from 1984 to 1992, and tells the story of her personal experience during the Cultural Revolution.

It was published in 1993 in the United Kingdom by Victor Gollancz Ltd.

The name comes from a proposed film about Jiang Qing that was canceled; Min had auditioned to be a part of that film.

== Background ==
The memoir was originally written in English and was not translated from another language. Min stated that she could not properly convey her feelings in Chinese. According to Min, "In Chinese, we don't have the vocabulary for intimate feelings."

Min stated "I wrote Red Azalea for the ghost of Little Green", referring to a female friend on a collective farm. Min stated that "Little Green" accused a boy of raping her; according to Min, in fact, the friend had consensual sexual intercourse, and authorities put pressure on her to say it was rape. Min stated that the friend experienced insanity after the boy was put to death.

== Story ==
The memoir was written in English. The names of the characters were translated into English instead of being spelled phonetically. For example, Min's first name, Anchee, means Jade of Peace, and her siblings' names are Blooming, Coral, and Space Conqueror. The autobiography deals with themes of ideology and gender and sexual psychology.

=== Part one ===
In part one, Min tells the story of her childhood in Shanghai under the rule of Mao Zedong during the 1960s. She believes wholeheartedly in Mao's Communism, and is an outstanding student. Her first conflict with this system comes when a favorite teacher is put on trial for espionage and the young Anchee Min is expected to testify against her.

=== Part two ===
Part two tells of her life on a farm outside of Shanghai with other teenagers. She is moved to a place called Red Fire Farm, a labor camp. She was assigned to work there and has little hope of escaping her life of manual labor. At this point, Min finds a role model to follow and stays on track with Maoism. She soon finds difficulty, however, when a friend is mentally broken by interrogation and humiliation after being discovered in a sexual situation with a man. Abuse of power by her superiors and a lesbian relationship with another farm-worker further erode Min's trust in Maoism. At the end of Part Two, she has been selected to move back to Shanghai and train to be an actress.

=== Part three ===
Part three is the story of her training at a film studio, in competition with other young trainees. More abuse of power and complex love relationships exacerbate her disillusion with Mao's system. She comes in and out of favor with her superiors in the film studio, depending on who is in charge. Eventually, her acting career falls through, and Min works as a clerk in the studio. At the end of part three, in 1976, Mao dies, and his wife Jiang Qing is arrested. The next few years are briefly mentioned, and the memoir ends with a short explanation of how Min came to live in the United States in 1984.

== Reception ==
Helena De Bertodano of The Daily Telegraph wrote that critical reception in Western countries was positive.

Harriet Evans in The China Quarterly wrote that the initial portion is "reads as a plausible account of life" and that the latter portion "suggests something approaching fantasy." According to Evans, "Hence a narrative that starts as an autobiography ends as a novel of romance and intrigue."

Kirkus Reviews wrote that the work is "Fascinating", "haunting and quietly dramatic"; the magazine also praised the "poetic, distinctively Chinese diction" even though the author's use of the English language had "slight awkwardness".

The book was banned in China. De Bertodano stated that the revelations involving a same sex romance and "dissident stance" made the reception in China negative.

== Edition ==
- Red Azalea. Pantheon Books 1994, ISBN 1-4000-9698-7
- Red Azalea. Knopf Doubleday Publishing Group. February 23, 2011. ISBN 978-0-307-78102-4.
