= Pearl S. Buck =

American writer (1892–1973)

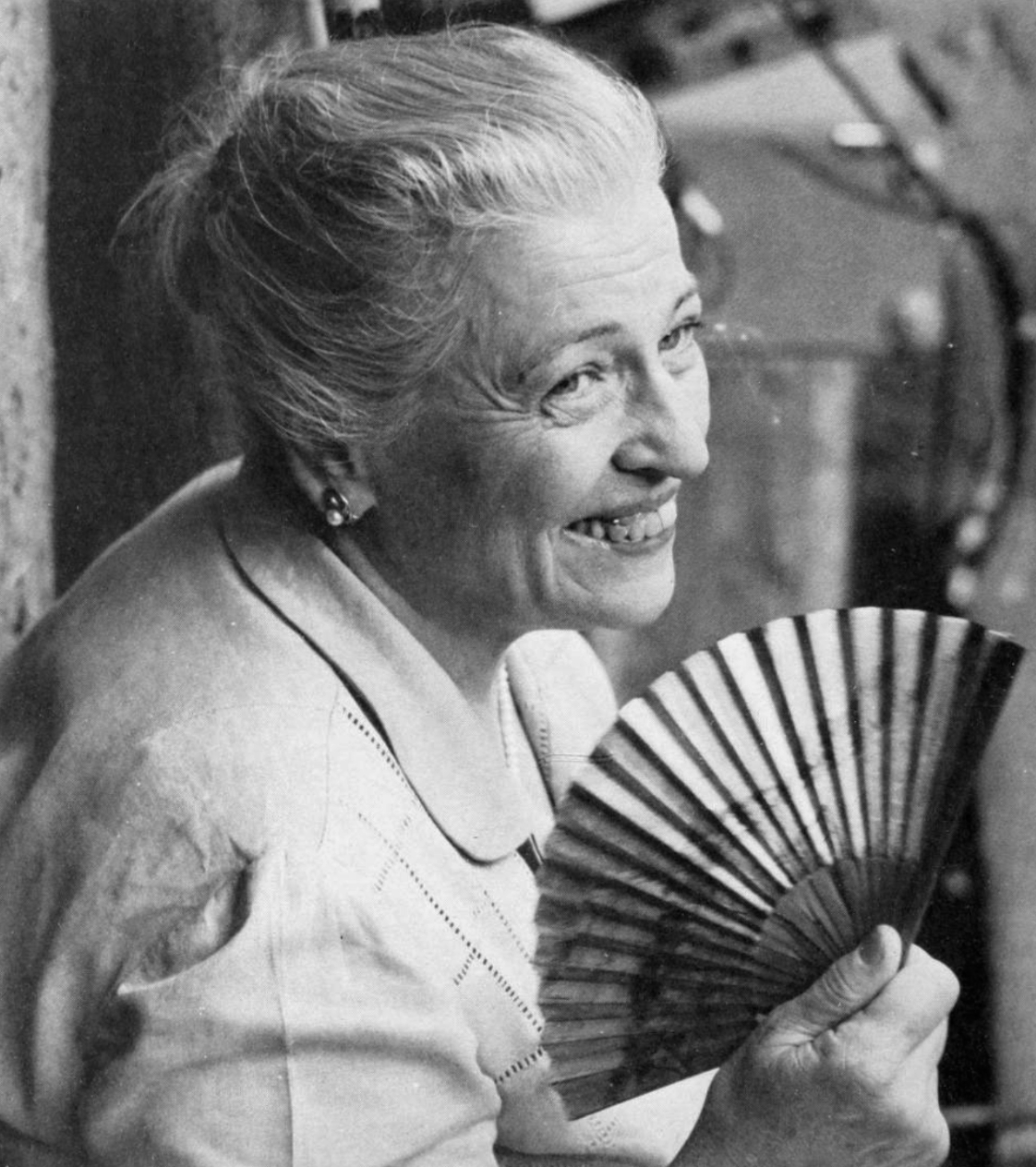
- Buck on the set of The Big Wave in 1960
- Born: Pearl Comfort Sydenstricker; June 26, 1892; Hillsboro, West Virginia, U.S.
- Died: March 6, 1973 (aged 80); Danby, Vermont, U.S.
- Education: Randolph College (BA); Cornell University (MA)
- Occupations: Writer; teacher; humanitarian; activist; film producer
- Spouse(s): John Lossing Buck (m. 1917; div. 1935) Richard John Walsh (m. 1935; died 1960)
- Children: 8
- Writing career
- Notable awards: Pulitzer Prize; 1932; Nobel Prize in Literature; 1938

Pearl Comfort Sydenstricker Buck (June 26, 1892 – March 6, 1973) was an American writer and humanitarian. She is best known for The Good Earth, the best-selling novel in the United States in 1931 and 1932, which won her the Pulitzer Prize in 1932. In 1938, Buck became the first American woman to win the Nobel Prize in Literature "for her rich and truly epic descriptions of peasant life in China" and for her "masterpieces", two memoir-biographies of her missionary parents.

Buck was born in West Virginia. She was an infant when, in October 1892, her family moved to China. As the daughter of missionaries and later as a missionary herself, Buck spent most of her life before 1934 in Zhenjiang and in Nanjing with her first husband. She and her parents spent their summers in a villa in Kuling, Mount Lu, Jiujiang, and it was during this annual pilgrimage that the young girl decided to become a writer. She graduated from Randolph-Macon Woman's College in Lynchburg, Virginia, then returned to China. From 1914 to 1932, after marrying John Lossing Buck, she served as a Presbyterian missionary, but she came to doubt the need for foreign missions. Her views became controversial during the Fundamentalist–modernist controversy, leading to her resignation.

After returning to the United States in 1935, Buck married the publisher Richard J. Walsh and continued writing prolifically. She became an activist and prominent advocate of the rights of women and racial equality, and wrote widely on Chinese and Asian cultures, becoming particularly well known for her efforts on behalf of Asian and mixed-race adoption.

== Early life and education ==
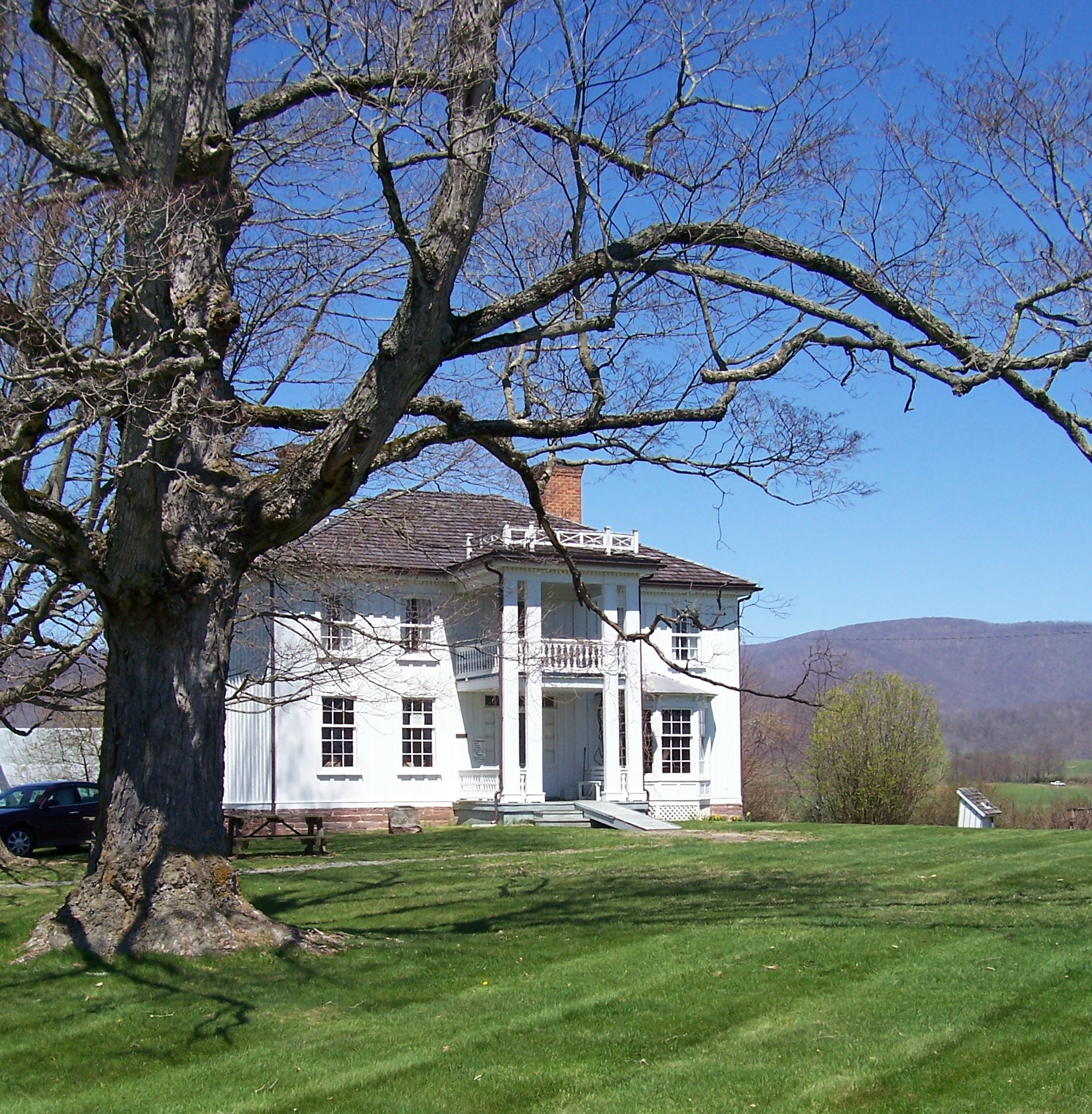
The Stulting House at the Pearl Buck Birthplace in Hillsboro, West Virginia

Pearl Comfort Sydenstricker was born in Hillsboro, West Virginia, to Absalom Sydenstricker (1852–1931) and Caroline Maude (Stulting) (1857–1921), of German and Dutch descent respectively. Her parents, Southern Presbyterian missionaries, were married on July 8, 1880, and moved to China shortly thereafter, but returned to the United States for Pearl's birth. When Pearl was five months old, the family returned to China, living first in Huai'an and then in 1896 moving to Zhenjiang, which was then known as Chingkiang in the Chinese postal romanization system, near the major city of Nanjing. In summer, she and her family spent time in Kuling. Her father built a stone villa in Kuling in 1897, and lived there until his death in 1931. It was during this annual summer pilgrimage in Kuling that the young girl decided to become a writer.

Of her siblings who survived into adulthood, Edgar Sydenstricker had a distinguished career with the U.S. Public Health Service and later the Milbank Memorial Fund, and Grace Sydenstricker Yaukey (1899–1994) wrote young adult books and books about Asia under the pen name Cornelia Spencer.

Pearl recalled in her memoir that she lived in "several worlds", one a "small, white, clean Presbyterian world of my parents", and the other the "big, loving merry not-too-clean Chinese world", and there was no communication between them. The Boxer Uprising (1899–1901) greatly affected the family; their Chinese friends deserted them, and Western visitors decreased. Her father, convinced that no Chinese could wish him harm, stayed behind as the rest of the family went to Shanghai for safety. A few years later, Buck was enrolled in Miss Jewell's School in Shanghai, and was dismayed at the racist attitudes there of other students, few of whom could speak any Chinese. Both of her parents felt strongly that Chinese were their equals; they forbade the use of the word heathen, and she was raised in a bilingual environment: tutored in English by her mother, in the local dialect by her Chinese playmates, and in classical Chinese by a Chinese scholar named Mr. Kung. She also read voraciously, especially, in spite of her father's disapproval, the novels of Charles Dickens, which she later said she read through once a year for the rest of her life.

In 1911, Buck left China to attend Randolph-Macon Woman's College in Lynchburg, Virginia, where she graduated Phi Beta Kappa in 1914 and was a member of Kappa Delta sorority.

== Career ==
=== China ===
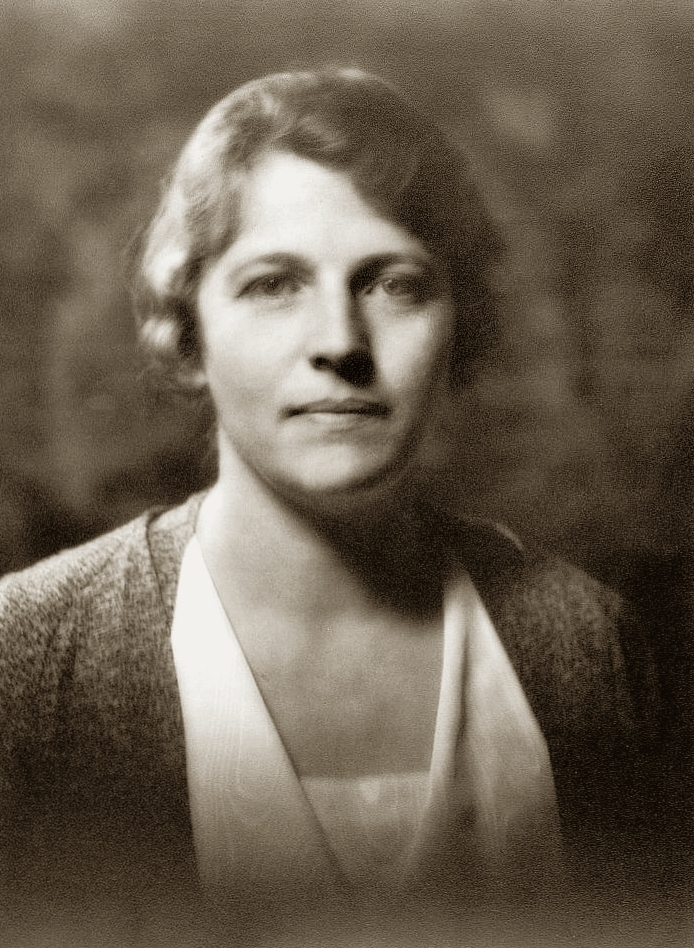
Buck photographed in 1932, about the time The Good Earth was published

Although Buck had not intended to return to China, much less become a missionary, she quickly applied to the Presbyterian Board when her father wrote that her mother was seriously ill. In 1914, Buck returned to China. She married an agricultural economist missionary, John Lossing Buck, on May 13, 1917, and they moved to Suzhou, Anhui Province, a small town on the Huai River (not to be confused with the better-known Suzhou in Jiangsu Province). This is the region she describes in her books The Good Earth and Sons.

From 1920 to 1933, the Bucks made their home in Nanjing, on the campus of the University of Nanking, where they both had teaching positions. She taught English literature at this private, church-run university, and also at Ginling College and at the National Central University. In 1920, the Bucks had a daughter, Carol, who was afflicted with phenylketonuria that left her severely developmentally disabled. Buck had to have a hysterectomy due to complications of Carol's birth, leaving her unable to have more biological children. In 1921, Buck's mother died of a tropical disease, sprue, and shortly afterward her father moved in. In 1924, they left China for John Buck's year of sabbatical and returned to the United States for a short time, during which Pearl Buck earned a master's degree from Cornell University. In 1925, the Bucks adopted a child named Janice (later surnamed Walsh). That autumn, they returned to China.

The tragedies and dislocations that Buck suffered in the 1920s reached a climax in March 1927, during the "Nanking Incident". In a confused battle involving elements of Chiang Kai-shek's Nationalist troops, Communist forces, and assorted warlords, several Westerners were murdered. Her father insisted that the family should stay in Nanjing until the battle reached the city, as he had in 1900 in the face of the Boxers. When violence broke out, a poor Chinese family invited them to hide in their hut while the family's house was looted. The family spent a day terrified and in hiding, after which American gunboats rescued them. They traveled to Shanghai and then sailed to Japan, where they stayed for a year, after which they moved back to Nanjing. Buck later said that this year in Japan showed her that not all Japanese were militarists. When she returned from Japan in late 1927, Buck devoted herself in earnest to the vocation of writing. Friendly relations with prominent Chinese writers of the time, such as Xu Zhimo and Lin Yutang, encouraged her to think of herself as a professional writer. She wanted to fulfill the ambitions denied to her mother, but she also needed money to support herself if she left her marriage, which had become increasingly lonely. Since the mission board could not provide it, she also needed money for Carol's specialized care.

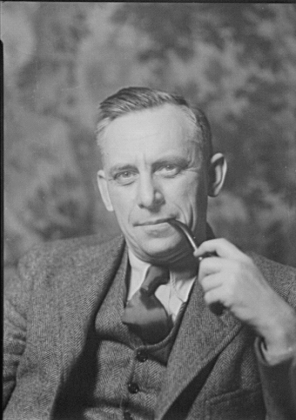
Buck married her publisher, Richard J. Walsh, the same day she divorced John Lossing Buck.

Buck traveled once more to the United States in 1929 to find long-term care for Carol, eventually placing her in the Vineland Training School in New Jersey. Buck served on the board of trustees for the school, where Carol would live until she died in 1992 at age 72. While Buck was in the United States, Richard J. Walsh, editor at John Day publishers in New York, accepted her novel East Wind: West Wind. She and Walsh began a relationship that would eventually lead to marriage and many years of professional collaboration.

Back in Nanking, Buck retreated every morning to the attic of her university house, and within the year, completed the manuscript for The Good Earth. She was involved in the charity relief campaign for the victims of the 1931 China floods, writing a series of short stories describing the plight of refugees, which were broadcast on the radio in the United States and later published in her collected volume The First Wife and Other Stories.

When her husband took the family to Ithaca, New York, the following year, Buck accepted an invitation to address a luncheon of Presbyterian women at the Hotel Astor in New York City. Her talk was titled "Is There a Case for the Foreign Missionary?" and her answer was a barely qualified "no". She told her American audience that she welcomed Chinese to share her Christian faith, but argued that China did not need an institutional church dominated by missionaries who were too often ignorant of China and arrogant in their attempts to control it. When the talk was published in Harper's Magazine, the scandalized reaction led Buck to resign from the Presbyterian Board. In 1934, Buck left China, believing she would return, while her husband remained.

=== United States ===
Buck divorced her husband John in Reno, Nevada, on June 11, 1935, and she married Richard Walsh that same day. He reportedly offered her advice and affection that, her biographer concludes, "helped make Pearl's prodigious activity possible". The couple moved with Janice to Green Hills Farm in Bucks County, Pennsylvania, which they quickly set about filling with adopted children. Two sons were brought home as infants in 1936 and followed by another son and daughter in 1937.

After the Communist Revolution in 1949, Buck was repeatedly refused all attempts to return to her beloved China. Her 1962 novel Satan Never Sleeps is heavily anti-communist and filled with religious themes, and was adapted into a film in the same year. During the Cultural Revolution, Buck, as a preeminent American writer of Chinese village life, was denounced as an "American cultural imperialist". Buck was "heartbroken" when she was prevented from visiting China with Richard Nixon in 1972, reportedly due to political interference by Jiang Qing, a prominent figure in the denunciation of Buck.

=== Nobel Prize in Literature ===
In 1938, the Nobel Prize committee wrote:

By awarding this year's Prize to Pearl Buck for the notable works which pave the way to a human sympathy passing over widely separated racial boundaries and for the studies of human ideals which are a great and living art of portraiture, the Swedish Academy feels that it acts in harmony and accord with the aim of Alfred Nobel's dreams for the future.

In her speech to the academy, Buck took as her topic "The Chinese Novel". She explained, "I am an American by birth and by ancestry", but "my earliest knowledge of story, of how to tell and write stories, came to me in China." After an extensive discussion of classic Chinese novels, especially Romance of the Three Kingdoms, All Men Are Brothers, and Dream of the Red Chamber, she concluded that in China "the novelist did not have the task of creating art but of speaking to the people." Her own ambition, she continued, had not been trained toward "the beauty of letters or the grace of art." In China, the task of the novelist differed from the Western artist: "To farmers he must talk of their land, and to old men he must speak of peace, and to old women he must tell of their children, and to young men and women he must speak of each other." And like the Chinese novelist, she concluded, "I have been taught to want to write for these people. If they are reading their magazines by the million, then I want my stories there rather than in magazines read only by a few."

=== Humanitarian efforts ===
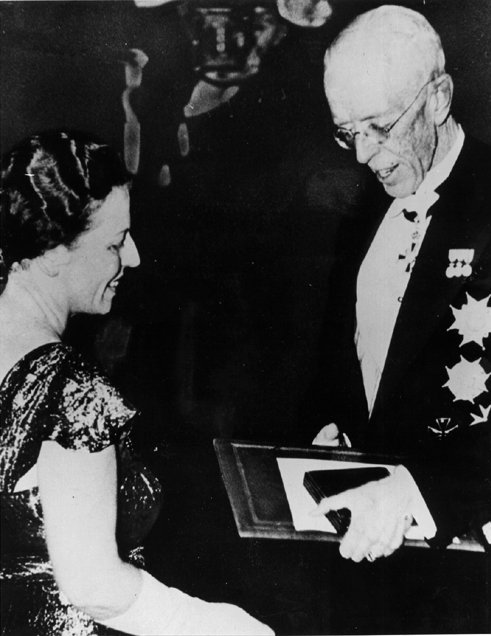
Pearl S. Buck receives the Nobel Prize for Literature from King Gustav V of Sweden in the Stockholm Concert Hall in 1938

Buck was committed to a range of issues that were largely ignored by her generation. Many of her life experiences and political views are described in her novels, short stories, fiction, children's stories, and the biographies of her parents entitled Fighting Angel (on Absalom) and The Exile (on Carrie). She wrote on diverse subjects, including women's rights, Asian cultures, immigration, adoption, missionary work, war, the atomic bomb (Command the Morning), and violence. Long before it was considered fashionable or politically safe to do so, Buck challenged the American public by raising consciousness on topics such as racism, sex discrimination and the plight of Asian war children. Buck combined the careers of wife, mother, author, editor, international spokesperson, and political activist. Buck became well known as an advocate for civil rights, women's rights, and disability rights.

In 1949, after finding that existing adoption services considered Asian and mixed-race children unadoptable, Buck founded the first permanent foster home for US-born mixed-race children of Asian descent, naming it The Welcome Home. The foster home was located in a 16-room farmhouse in Pennsylvania next door to Buck's own home, Green Hill Farm, and Buck was actively involved in everything from planning the children's diets to buying their clothing. Among the home's Board of Directors were librettist Oscar Hammerstein II and his second wife, interior designer Dorothy, composer Richard Rodgers, seed company tycoon David Burpee and his wife Lois and author James A. Michener. As more and more children were referred to the foster home, however, it quickly became apparent that it couldn't accommodate them all and adoptive homes were needed. Welcome Home was turned into the first international, interracial adoption agency, and Buck began actively promoting the adoption of mixed-race children to the American public. In an effort to overcome the longstanding public view that such children were inferior and undesirable, Buck claimed in interviews and speeches that "hybrid" children of interracial backgrounds were actually genetically superior to other children in terms of intelligence and health. She and her husband Richard then adopted two mixed-race daughters from overseas themselves: an Afro-German girl in 1951 and an Afro-Japanese girl in 1957, giving her eight children in total. In 1967 she turned over most of her earnings—more than $7 million— to the adoption agency to help with costs.

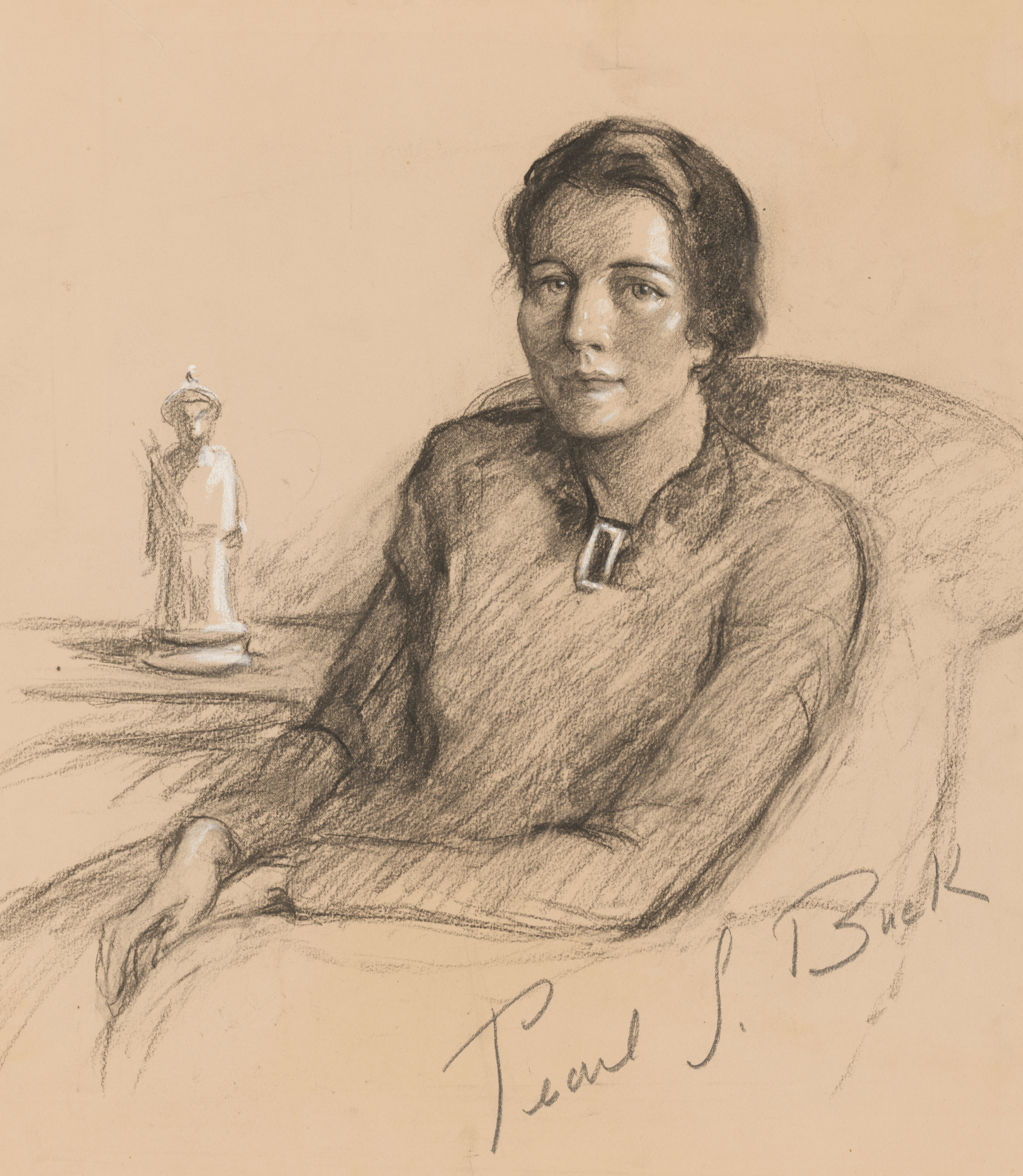
Portrait of Buck by Samuel Johnson Woolf

Buck established the Pearl S. Buck Foundation (name changed to Pearl S. Buck International in 1999) to "address poverty and discrimination faced by children in Asian countries." In 1964, she opened the Opportunity Center and Orphanage in South Korea, and later offices were opened in Thailand, the Philippines, and Vietnam. When establishing Opportunity House, Buck said, "The purpose ... is to publicize and eliminate injustices and prejudices suffered by children, who, because of their birth, are not permitted to enjoy the educational, social, economic and civil privileges normally accorded to children." In 1960, after a long decline in health that included a series of strokes, Buck's husband Richard Walsh died. She renewed a warm relationship with William Ernest Hocking, who died in 1966. Buck then withdrew from many of her old friends and quarreled with others.

In 1962 Buck asked the Israeli Government for clemency for Adolf Eichmann, the Nazi war criminal who was one of the main architects of the murder of six million Jews during World War II, as she and others believed that carrying out capital punishment against Eichmann could be seen as an act of vengeance, especially since the war had ended.

During a December 17, 1962 visit to the Kennedy White House, Buck urged the Kennedy administration to help resolve People's Republic of China-Taiwan relations by supporting de facto independence of Taiwan for a 10 to 25-year period with an agreement that afterwards a plebiscite could be held based on a negotiated settlement.

Buck's ties with her native state remained strong. In the title essay of My Mother's House, a small book written by Buck and others to help raise funds for the Birthplace Museum, she paid tribute to the house her mother had cherished while living far away: "For me it was a living heart in the country I knew was my own but which was strange to me until I returned to the house where I was born." In the late 1960s, Buck toured West Virginia to raise money to preserve her family farm in Hillsboro, West Virginia. Today the Pearl S. Buck Birthplace is a historic house museum and cultural center. She hoped the house would "belong to everyone who cares to go there," and serve as a "gateway to new thoughts and dreams and ways of life." Former U.S. President George H. W. Bush toured the Pearl S. Buck House in October 1998. He expressed that he, like millions of other Americans, had gained an appreciation for the Chinese people through Buck's writing.

== Final years and death ==
In the mid-1960s, Buck increasingly came under the influence of Theodore Harris, a former dance instructor, who became her confidant, co-author, and financial advisor. She soon depended on him for all her daily routines, and placed him in control of Welcome House and the Pearl S. Buck Foundation. Harris, who was given a lifetime salary as head of the foundation, created a scandal for Buck when he was accused of mismanaging the foundation, diverting large amounts of the foundation's funds for his friends' and his own personal expenses, and treating staff poorly. Buck defended Harris, stating that he was "very brilliant, very high strung and artistic." Before her death, Buck signed over her foreign royalties and her personal possessions to Creativity Inc., a foundation controlled by Harris.

Pearl S. Buck died of lung cancer on March 6, 1973, in Danby, Vermont. She was interred on Green Hills Farm in Perkasie, Pennsylvania. She designed her own tombstone. Her name was not inscribed in English on her tombstone. Instead, the grave marker is inscribed with the Chinese characters 賽珍珠 (pinyin: Sài Zhēnzhū) in seal script, representing the name "Pearl Sydenstricker", specifically, Sài is the Sinicised first syllable of her surname (Chinese family names come first), and Zhēnzhū is the Mandarin word for "pearl".

Buck left behind three contradictory wills, resulting in a three-way legal dispute over her estate between her financial advisor Theodore Harris, the nonprofit Pearl Buck Foundation, and her seven adopted children. After a six-year battle, the dispute was settled in her children's favor after both Harris and the Pearl Buck Foundation dropped their claims (the latter in return for a financial settlement from Buck's children).

== Legacy ==
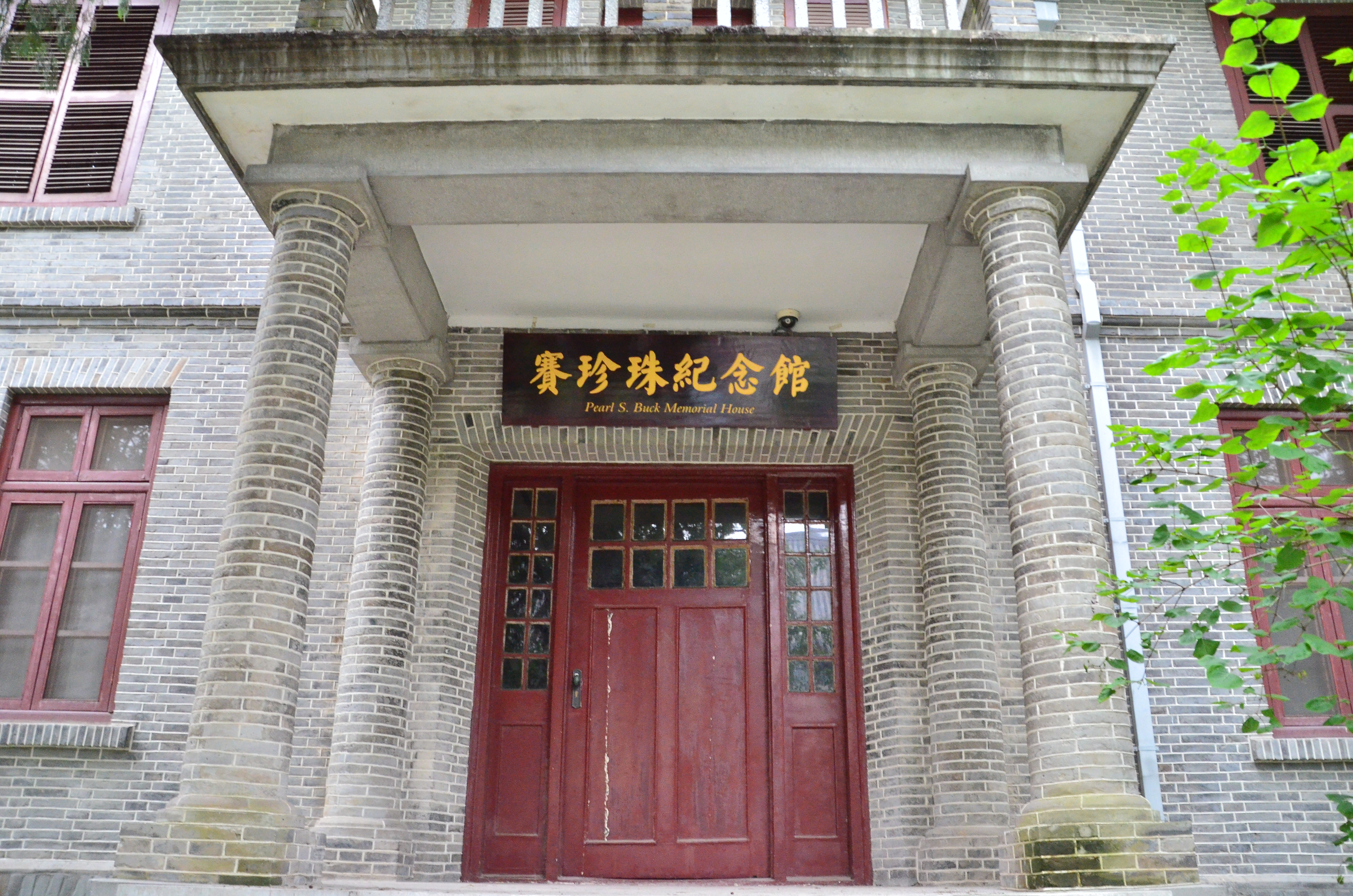
Pearl S. Buck's former residence at Nanjing University

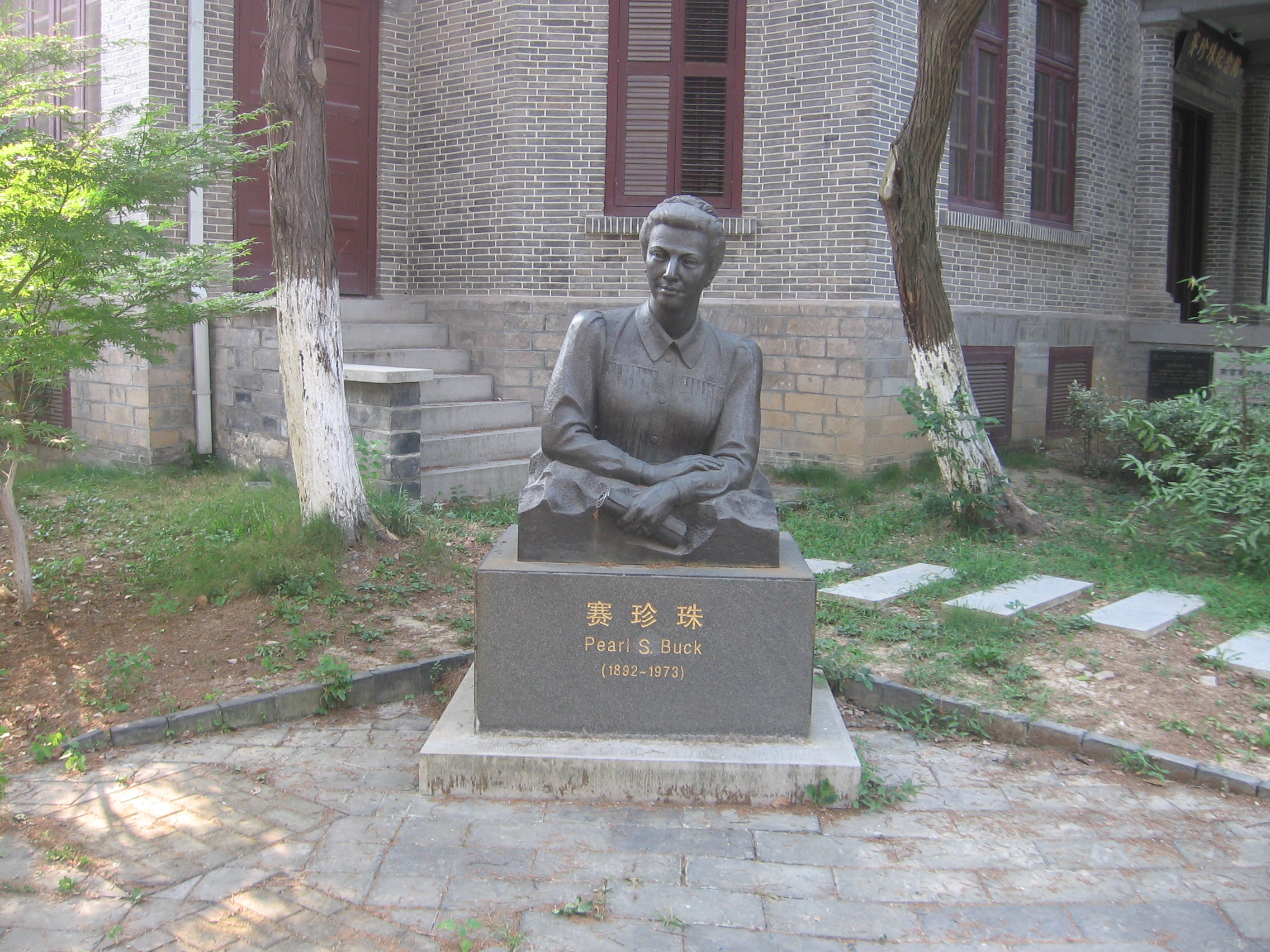
A statue of Pearl S. Buck stands in front of the former residence at Nanjing University

Many contemporary reviewers praised Buck's "beautiful prose", even though her "style is apt to degenerate into over-repetition and confusion". Robert Benchley wrote a parody of The Good Earth that emphasised these qualities. Peter Conn, in his biography of Buck, argues that despite the accolades awarded to her, Buck's contribution to literature has been mostly forgotten or deliberately ignored by America's cultural gatekeepers. Kang Liao argues that Buck played a "pioneering role in demythologizing China and the Chinese people in the American mind". Phyllis Bentley, in an overview of Buck's work published in 1935, was altogether impressed: "But we may say at least that for the interest of her chosen material, the sustained high level of her technical skill, and the frequent universality of her conceptions, Mrs. Buck is entitled to take rank as a considerable artist. To read her novels is to gain not merely knowledge of China but wisdom about life." These works aroused considerable popular sympathy for China, and helped foment a more critical view of Japan and its aggression.

Chinese-American author Anchee Min said she "broke down and sobbed" after reading The Good Earth for the first time as an adult, which she had been forbidden to read growing up in China during the Cultural Revolution. Min said Buck portrayed the Chinese peasants "with such love, affection and humanity" and it inspired Min's novel Pearl of China (2010).

In 1973, Buck was inducted into the National Women's Hall of Fame. Buck was honored in 1983 with a 5¢ Great Americans series postage stamp issued by the United States Postal Service In 1999 she was designated a Women's History Month Honoree by the National Women's History Project.

Buck's former residence at Nanjing University is now the Pearl S. Buck Memorial House (Chinese: 賽珍珠紀念館; pinyin: Sai Zhenzhu Jinianguan) along the West Wall of the university's north campus.

Pearl Buck's papers and literary manuscripts are currently housed at Pearl S. Buck International and the West Virginia & Regional History Center.

== Selected works ==
=== Autobiographies ===
- My Several Worlds: A Personal Record (New York: John Day, 1954)
- My Several Worlds – abridged for younger readers by Cornelia Spencer (New York: John Day, 1957)
- A Bridge for Passing (New York: John Day, 1962) – autobiographical account of the filming of the film adaptation of Buck's children's book, The Big Wave

=== Biographies ===
- The Exile: Portrait of an American Mother (New York: John Day, 1936) – about her mother, Caroline Stulting Sydenstricker (1857–1921); serialized in Woman's Home Companion magazine (10/1935–3/1936)
- Fighting Angel: Portrait of a Soul (New York: Reynal & Hitchcock, 1936) – about her father, Absalom Sydenstricker (1852–1931)
- The Spirit and the Flesh (New York: John Day, 1944) – published the two above-mentioned biographies in one volume - Fighting Angel: Portrait of a Soul and The Exile: Portrait of an American Mother.

=== Novels ===
- East Wind: West Wind (New York: John Day, 1930) – working title Winds of Heaven
- The Good Earth (New York: John Day, 1931); The House of Earth trilogy #1
- Sons (New York: John Day, 1933); The House of Earth trilogy #2; serialized in Cosmopolitan (4–11/1932)
- A House Divided (New York: Reynal & Hitchcock, 1935); The House of Earth trilogy #3
- The House of Earth (trilogy) (New York: Reynal & Hitchcock, 1935) – includes: The Good Earth, Sons, A House Divided
- All Men Are Brothers (New York: John Day, 1933; revised 1937) – a translation by Buck of the Chinese classical prose epic Water Margin (Shui Hu Zhuan)
- The Mother (New York: John Day, 1933) – serialized in Cosmopolitan (7/1933–1/1934)
- This Proud Heart (New York: Reynal & Hitchcock, 1938) – serialized in Good Housekeeping magazine (8/1937–2/1938)
- The Patriot (New York: John Day, 1939)
- Other Gods: An American Legend (New York: John Day, 1940) – excerpt serialized in Good Housekeeping magazine as "American Legend" (12/1938–5/1939)
- China Sky (New York: John Day, 1941) – China trilogy #1; serialized in Collier's Weekly magazine (2–4/1941)
- China Gold: A Novel of War-torn China (New York: John Day, 1942) – China trilogy #2; serialized in Collier's Weekly magazine (2–4/1942)
- Dragon Seed (New York: John Day, 1942) – serialized in Asia (9/1941–2/1942)
- The Promise (New York: John Day, 1943) – sequel to Dragon Seed; serialized in Asia and the Americas (Asia) (11/1942–10/1943)
- China Flight (Philadelphia: Triangle Books/Blakiston Company, 1945) – China trilogy #3; serialized in Collier's Weekly magazine (2–4/1943)
- Portrait of a Marriage (New York: John Day, 1945) – illustrated by Charles Hargens
- The Townsman (New York: John Day, 1945) – as John Sedges
- Pavilion of Women (New York: John Day, 1946) – made into a feature film Pavilion of Women (Universal Focus, 2001)
- The Angry Wife (New York: John Day, 1947) – as John Sedges
- Peony (New York: John Day, 1948) – published in the UK as The Bondmaid (London: T. Brun, 1949); – serialized in Cosmopolitan (3–4/1948)
- Kinfolk (New York: John Day, 1949) – serialized in Ladies' Home Journal (10/1948–2/1949)
- The Long Love (New York: John Day, 1949) – as John Sedges
- God's Men (New York: John Day, 1951)
- Sylvia (1951) – alternate title No Time for Love, serialized in Redbook magazine (1951)
- Bright Procession (New York: John Day, 1952) – as John Sedges
- The Hidden Flower (New York: John Day, 1952) – serialized in Woman's Home Companion magazine (3–4/1952)
- Come, My Beloved (New York: John Day, 1953)
- Voices in the House (New York: John Day, 1953) – as John Sedges
- Imperial Woman The Story of the Last Empress of China (New York: John Day, 1956) – about Empress Dowager Cixi; serialized in Woman's Home Companion (3–4/1956)
- Letter from Peking (New York: John Day, 1957)
- American Triptych: Three John Sedges Novels (New York: John Day, 1958) – includes The Townsman, The Long Love, Voices in the House
- Command the Morning (New York: John Day, 1959)
- Satan Never Sleeps (New York: Pocket Books, 1962)
- The Living Reed A Novel of Korea (New York: John Day, 1963)
- Death in the Castle (New York: John Day, 1965)
- The Time Is Noon (New York: John Day, 1966)
- The New Year (New York: John Day, 1968)
- The Three Daughters of Madame Liang (London: Methuen, 1969)
- Mandala: A Novel of India (New York: John Day, 1970)
- The Goddess Abides (New York: John Day, 1972)
- All under Heaven (New York: John Day, 1973)
- The Rainbow (New York: John Day, 1974)
- The Eternal Wonder (believed to have been written shortly before her death, published in October 2013)

=== Non-fiction ===
- Is There a Case for Foreign Missions? (New York: John Day, 1932)
- The Chinese Novel: Nobel Lecture Delivered before the Swedish Academy at Stockholm, December 12, 1938 (New York: John Day, 1939)
- Of Men and Women (New York: John Day, 1941) – Essays
- American Unity and Asia (New York: John Day, 1942) – UK edition titled Asia and Democracy, London: Macmillan, 1943) – Essays
- What America Means to Me (New York: John Day, 1943) – UK edition (London: Methuen, 1944) – Essays
- Talk about Russia (with Masha Scott) (New York: John Day, 1945) – serialized in Asia and the Americas magazine (Asia) as Talks with Masha (1945)
- Tell the People: Talks with James Yen about the Mass Education Movement (New York: John Day, 1945)
- How It Happens: Talk about the German People, 1914–1933, with Erna von Pustau (New York: John Day, 1947)
- American Argument with Eslanda Goode Robeson (New York: John Day, 1949)
- The Child Who Never Grew (New York: John Day, 1950)
- The Man Who Changed China: The Story of Sun Yat-sen (New York: John Day, 1953) – for children
- Friend to Friend: A Candid Exchange between Pearl S. Buck and Carlos P. Romulo (New York: John Day, 1958)
- For Spacious Skies (1966)
- The People of Japan (1966)
- To My Daughters, with Love (New York: John Day, 1967)
- The Kennedy Women (1970)
- China as I See It (1970)
- The Story Bible (1971)
- Pearl S. Buck's Oriental Cookbook (1972)
- Words of Love (1974)

=== Collections ===
- The First Wife and Other Stories (London: Methuen, 1933) – includes: "The First Wife", "The Old Mother", "The Frill", "The Quarrell", "Repatriated", "The Rainy Day", "Wang Lung", "The Communist", "Father Andrea", "The New Road", "Barren Spring", *"The Refugees", "Fathers and Mothers", "The Good River"
- Today and Forever: Stories of China (New York: John Day, 1941) – includes: "The Lesson", The Angel", "Mr. Binney's Afternoon", "The Dance", "Shanghai Scene", "Hearts Come Home", "His Own Country", "Tiger! Tiger!", "Golden flower", "The Face of Buddha", "Guerrilla Mother", "A Man's Foes", "The Old Demon"
- Twenty-seven Stories (Garden City, NY: Sun Dial Press, 1943) – includes (from The First Wife and Other Stories): "The First Wife", "The Old Mother", "The Frill", "The Quarrell", "Repatriated", "The Rainy Day", Wang Lung", "The Communist", "Father Andrea", "The New Road", "Barren Spring", *"The Refugees", "Fathers and Mothers", "The Good River"; and (from Today and Forever: Stories of China): "The Lesson", The Angel", "Mr. Binney's Afternoon", "The Dance", "Shanghai Scene", "Hearts Come Home", "His Own Country", "Tiger! Tiger!", "Golden flower", "The Face of Buddha", "Guerrilla Mother", "A Man's Foes", "The Old Demon"
- Far and Near: Stories of Japan, China, and America (New York: John Day, 1947) – includes: "The Enemy", "Home Girl", "Mr. Right", "The Tax Collector", "A Few People", "Home to Heaven", "Enough for a Lifetime", "Mother and Sons", "Mrs. Mercer and Her Self", "The Perfect Wife", "Virgin birth", "The Truce", "Heat Wave", "The One Woman"
- Fourteen Stories (New York: John Day, 1961) – includes: "A Certain Star," "The Beauty", "Enchantment", "With a Delicate Air", "Beyond Language", "Parable of Plain People", "The Commander and the Commissar", "Begin to Live", "The Engagement", "Melissa", "Gift of Laughter", "Death and the Dawn", "The Silver Butterfly", "Francesca"
- Hearts Come Home and Other Stories (New York: Pocket Books, 1962)
- Stories of China (1964)
- Escape at Midnight and Other Stories (1964)
- The Good Deed, and other Stories of Asia, Past and Present (1970)
- East and West Stories (1975)
- Secrets of the Heart: Stories (1976)
- The Lovers and Other Stories (1977)
- Mrs. Stoner and the Sea and Other Stories (1978)
- The Woman Who Was Changed and Other Stories (1979)
- Beauty Shop Series: "Revenge in a Beauty Shop" (1939) – original title "The Perfect Hairdresser"
- Beauty Shop Series: "Gold Mine" (1940)
- Beauty Shop Series: "Mrs. Whittaker's Secret"/"The Blonde Brunette" (1940)
- Beauty Shop Series: "Procession of Song" (1940)
- Beauty Shop Series: "Snake at the Picnic" (1940) – published as "Seed of Sin" (1941)
- Beauty Shop Series: "Seed of Sin" (1941) – published as "Snake at the Picnic (1940)

=== Individual short stories ===
- Unknown title (1902) – first published story, pen name "Novice", Shanghai Mercury
- "The Real Santa Claus" (c. 1911)
- "Village by the Sea" (1911)
- "By the Hand of a Child" (1912)
- "The Hours of Worship" (1914)
- "When 'Lof' Comes" (1914)
- "The Clutch of the Ancients" (1924)
- "The Rainy Day" (c. 1925)
- "A Chinese Woman Speaks" (1926)
- "Lao Wang, the Farmer" (1926)
- "The Solitary Priest" (1926)
- "The Revolutionist" (1928) – later published as "Wang Lung" (1933)
- "The Wandering Little God" (1928)
- "Father Andrea" (1929)
- "The New Road" (1930)
- "Singing to her Death" (1930)
- "The Barren Spring" (1931)
- "The First Wife" (1931)
- "The Old Chinese Nurse" (1932)
- "The Quarrel" (1932)
- "The Communist" (1933)
- "Fathers and Mothers" (1933)
- "The Frill" (1933)
- "Hidden is the Golden Dragon" (1933)
- "The Lesson" (1933) – later published as "No Other Gods" (1936; original title used in short story collections)
- "The Old Mother" (1933)
- "The Refugees" (1933)
- "Repatriated" (1933)
- "The Return" (1933)
- "The River" (1933) – later published as "The Good River" (1939)
- "The Two Women" (1933)
- "The Beautiful Ladies" (1934) – later published as "Mr. Binney's Afternoon" (1935)
- "Fool's Sacrifice" (1934)
- "Shanghai Scene" (1934)
- "Wedding and Funeral" (1934)
- "Between These Two" (1935)
- "The Dance" (1935)
- "Enough for a Lifetime" (1935)
- "Hearts Come Home" (1935)
- "Heat Wave" (1935)
- "His Own Country" (1935)
- "The Perfect Wife" (1935)
- "Vignette of Love" (1935) – later published as "Next Saturday and Forever" (1977)
- "The Crusade" (1936)
- "Strangers Are Kind" (1936)
- "The Truce" (1936)
- "What the Heart Must" (1937) – later published as "Someone to Remember" (1947)
- "The Angel" (1937)
- "Faithfully" (1937)
- "Ko-Sen, the Sacrificed" (1937)
- "Now and Forever" (1937) – serialized in Woman's Home Companion magazine (10/1936–3/1937)
- "The Woman Who Was Changed" (1937) – serialized in Redbook magazine (7–9/1937)
- "The Pearls of O-lan" – from The Good Earth (1938)
- "Ransom" (1938)
- "Tiger! Tiger!" (1938)
- "Wonderful Woman" (1938) – serialized in Redbook magazine (6–8/1938)
- "For a Thing Done" (1939) – originally titled "While You Are Here"
- "The Old Demon" (1939) – reprinted in Great Modern Short Stories: An Anthology of Twelve Famous Stories and Novelettes, selected, and with a foreword and biographical notes by Bennett Cerf (New York: The Modern library, 1942)
- "The Face of Gold" (1940, in Saturday Evening Post) – later published as "The Face of Buddha" (1941)
- "Golden Flower" (1940)
- "Iron" (1940) – later published as "A Man's Foes" (1940)
- "The Old Signs Fail" (1940)
- "Stay as You Are" (1940) – serialized in Cosmopolitan (3–7/1940)
- "There Was No Peace" (1940) – later published as "Guerrilla Mother" (1941)
- "Answer to Life" (novella; 1941)
- "More Than a Woman" (1941) – originally titled "Deny It if You Can"
- "Our Daily Bread" (1941) – originally titled "A Man's Daily Bread, 1–3", serialized in Redbook magazine (2–4/1941), longer version published as Portrait of a Marriage (1945)
- The Enemy (1942, Harper's Magazine) – staged by the Indian "Aamra Kajon" (Drama Society), on the Bengal Theatre Festival 2019
- "John-John Chinaman" (1942) – original title "John Chinaman"
- "The Long Way 'Round" – serialized in Cosmopolitan (9/1942–2/1943)
- "Mrs. Barclay's Christmas Present" (1942) – later published as "Gift of Laughter" (1943)
- "Descent into China" (1944)
- "Journey for Life" (1944) – originally titled "Spark of Life"
- "The Real Thing" (1944) – serialized in Cosmopolitan (2–6/1944); originally intendeds as a serial "Harmony Hill" (1938)
- "Begin to Live" (1945)
- "Mother and Sons" (1945)
- "A Time to Love" (1945) – later published under its original title "The Courtyards of Peace" (1969)
- "Big Tooth Yang" (1946) – later published as "The Tax Collector" (1947)
- "The Conqueror's Girl" (1946) – later published as "Home Girl" (1947)
- "Faithfully Yours" (1947)
- "Home to Heaven" (1947)
- "Incident at Wang's Corner" (1947) – later published as "A Few People" (1947)
- "Mr. Right" (1947)
- "Mrs. Mercer and Her Self" (1947)
- "The One Woman" (1947)
- "Virgin Birth" (1947)
- "Francesca" (Good Housekeeping magazine, 1948)
- "The Ember" (1949)
- "The Tryst" (1950)
- "Love and the Morning Calm" – serialized in Redbook magazine (1–4/1951)
- "The Man Called Dead" (1952)
- "Death and the Spring" (1953)
- "Moon over Manhattan" (1953)
- "The Three Daughters" (1953)
- "The Unwritten Rules" (1953)
- "The Couple Who Lived on the Moon" (1953) – later published as "The Engagement" (1961)
- "A Husband for Lili" (1953) – later published as "The Good Deed" (1969)
- "The Heart's Beginning" (1954)
- "The Shield of Love" (1954)
- "Christmas Day in the Morning" (1955) – later published as "The Gift That Lasts a Lifetime"
- "Death and the Dawn" (1956)
- "Mariko" (1956)
- "A Certain Star" (1957)
- "Honeymoon Blues" (1957)
- "China Story" (1958)
- "Leading Lady" (1958) – alternately titled "Open the Door, Lady"
- "The Secret" (1958)
- "With a Delicate Air" (1959)
- "The Bomb (Dr. Arthur Compton)" (1959)
- "Heart of a Man" (1959)
- "Melissa" (1960)
- "The Silver Butterfly" (1960)
- "The Beauty" (1961)
- "Beyond Language" (1961)
- "The Commander and the Commissar" (1961)
- "Enchantment" (1961)
- "Parable of Plain People" (1961)
- "A Field of Rice" (1962)
- "A Grandmother's Christmas" (1962) – later published as "This Day to Treasure" (1972)
- ""Never Trust the Moonlight" (1962) – later published as "The Green Sari" (1962)
- "The Cockfight, 1963
- "A Court of Love" (1963)
- "Escape at Midnight" (1963)
- "The Lighted Window" (1963)
- "Night Nurse" (1963)
- "The Sacred Skull" (1963)
- "The Trap" (1963)
- "India, My India" (1964)
- "Ranjit and the Tiger" (1964)
- "A Certain Wisdom" (1967, in Woman's Day magazine)
- "Stranger Come Home" (1967)
- "The House They Built" (1968, in Boys' Life magazine)
- "The Orphan in My Home" (1968)
- "Secrets of the Heart" (1968)
- "All the Days of Love and Courage" 1969) – later published as "The Christmas Child" (1972)
- "Dagger in the Dark" (1969)
- "Duet in Asia" (1969; written 1953
- "Going Home" (1969)
- "Letter Home" (1969; written 1943)
- "Sunrise at Juhu" (1969)
- "Two in Love" (1970) – later published as "The Strawberry Vase" (1976)
- "The Gifts of Joy" (1971)
- "Once upon a Christmas" (1971)
- "The Christmas Secret" (1972)
- "Christmas Story" (1972)
- "In Loving Memory" (1972) – later published as "Mrs. Stoner and the Sea" (1976)
- "The New Christmas" (1972)
- "The Miracle Child" (1973)
- "Mrs. Barton Declines" (1973) – later published as "Mrs. Barton's Decline" and "Mrs. Barton's Resurrection" (1976)
- "Darling Let Me Stay" (1975) – excerpt from "Once upon a Christmas" (1971)
- "Dream Child" (1975)
- "The Golden Bowl" (1975; written 1942)
- "Letter from India" (1975)
- "To Whom a Child is Born" (1975)
- "Alive again" (1976)
- "Come Home My Son" (1976)
- "Here and Now" (1976; written 1941)
- "Morning in the Park" (1976; written 1948)
- "Search for a Star" (1976)
- "To Thine Own Self" (1976)
- "The Woman in the Waves" (1976; written 1953)
- "The Kiss" (1977)
- "The Lovers" (1977)
- "Miranda" (1977)
- "The Castle" (1979; written 1949)
- "A Pleasant Evening" (1979; written 1948)
- Christmas Miniature (New York: John Day, 1957) – in UK as Christmas Mouse (London: Methuen, 1959) – illustrated by Anna Marie Magagna
- Christmas Ghost (New York: John Day, 1960) – illustrated by Anna Marie Magagna

Unpublished stories

- "The Good Rich Man" (1937, unsold)
- "The Sheriff" (1937, unsold)
- "High and Mighty" (1938, unsold)
- "Mrs. Witler's Husband" (1938, unsold)
- "Mother and Daughter" (1938, unsold; alternate title "My Beloved")
- "Mother without Child" (1940, unsold)
- "Instead of Diamonds" (1953, unsold)

Unpublished stories, undated

- "The Assignation" (submitted not sold)
- "The Big Dance" (unsold)
- "The Bleeding Heart" (unsold)
- "The Bullfrog" (unsold)
- "The Day at Dawn" (unpublished)
- "The Director"
- "Heart of the Jungle (submitted, unsold)
- "Images" (sold but unpublished)
- "Lesson in Biology" / "Useless Wife" (unsold)
- "Morning in Okinawa" (unsold)
- "Mrs. Jones of Jerrell Street" (unsold)
- "One of Our People" (sold, unpublished)
- "Summer Fruit" (unsold)
- "Three Nights with Love" (submitted, unsold) – original title "More Than a Woman"
- "Too Many Flowers" (unsold)
- "Wang the Ancient" (unpublished)
- "Wang the White Boy" (unpublished)

Stories: Date unknown

- "Church Woman"
- "Crucifixion"
- "Dear Son"
- "Escape Me Never" – alternate title of "For a Thing Done"
- "The Great Soul"
- "Her Father's Wife"
- "Horse Face"
- "Lennie"
- "The Magic Dragon"
- "Mrs. Jones of Jerrell Street" (unsold)
- "Night of the Dance"
- "One and Two"
- "Pleasant Vampire"
- "Rhoda and Mike"
- "The Royal Family"
- "The Searcher"
- "Steam and Snow"
- "Tinder and the Flame"
- "The War Chest"
- "To Work the Sleeping Land"

=== Children's books and stories ===
- The Young Revolutionist (New York: John Day, 1932) – for children
- Stories for Little Children (New York: John Day, 1940) – pictures by Weda Yap
- "When Fun Begins" (1941)
- The Chinese Children Next Door (New York: John Day, 1942)
- The Water Buffalo Children (New York: John Day, 1943) – drawings by William Arthur Smith
- Dragon Fish (New York: John Day, 1944) – illustrated by Esther Brock Bird
- Yu Lan: Flying Boy of China (New York: John Day, 1945) – drawings by Georg T. Hartmann
- The Big Wave (New York: John Day, 1948) – illustrated with prints by Hiroshige and Hokusai – for children
- One Bright Day (New York: John Day, 1950) – published in the UK as One Bright Day and Other Stories for Children (1952)
- The Beech Tree (New York: John Day, 1954) – illustrated by Kurt Werth – for children
- "Johnny Jack and His Beginnings" (New York: John Day, 1954)
- "Christmas Day in the Morning" (1955) (Copyright renewed 1983, illustrations copyright 2002 by Mark Buehner. Harper Collin's Publishers.
- Christmas Miniature (1957) – published in the UK as The Christmas Mouse (1958)
- "The Christmas Ghost" (1960)
- "Welcome Child (1964)
- "The Big Fight" (1965)
- "The Little Fox in the Middle" (1966)
- Matthew, Mark, Luke and John (New York: John Day, 1967) – set in South Korea
- "The Chinese Storyteller" (1971)
- "A Gift for the Children" (1973)
- "Mrs Starling's Problem" (1973)

=== Television credits ===
- Omnibus (1957) as herself [episode "Brewsie and Willie"]
- Person to Person (1956) as herself [season 3, episode 29]
- The Alcoa Hour (1956) - screenwriter [season 2, episode 2; "The Big Wave"]
- Robert Montgomery Presents (1957) - screenwriter [season 8, episode 26; "The Enemy"]

=== Film credits ===
- The Good Earth (1937)
- Dragon Seed (1944)
- China Sky (1945)
- The Big Wave (1961) - Official film debut; Screenwriter [with Tad Danielewski] and executive producer
- The Guide (1965) - Screenwriter
- China: The Roots of Madness (1967) as herself

== Awards and recognition ==
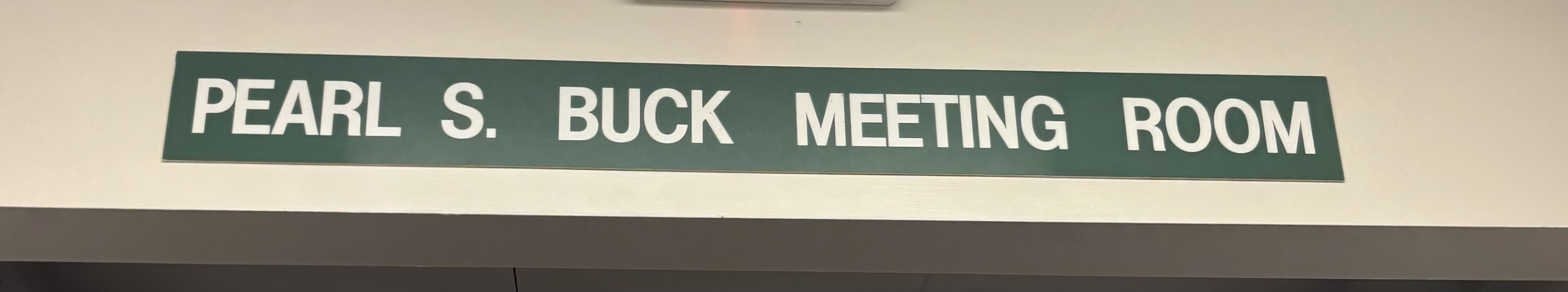
Sign for the Pearl S. Buck Meeting Room, photographed outside of the Doylestown Branch of Bucks County Free Library in 2025.

- Pulitzer Prize for the Novel: The Good Earth (1932)
- William Dean Howells Medal (1935)
- Nobel Prize in Literature (1938)
- Child Study Association of America's Children's Book Award (now Bank Street Children's Book Committee's Josette Frank Award): The Big Wave (1948)

== Museums and historic houses ==
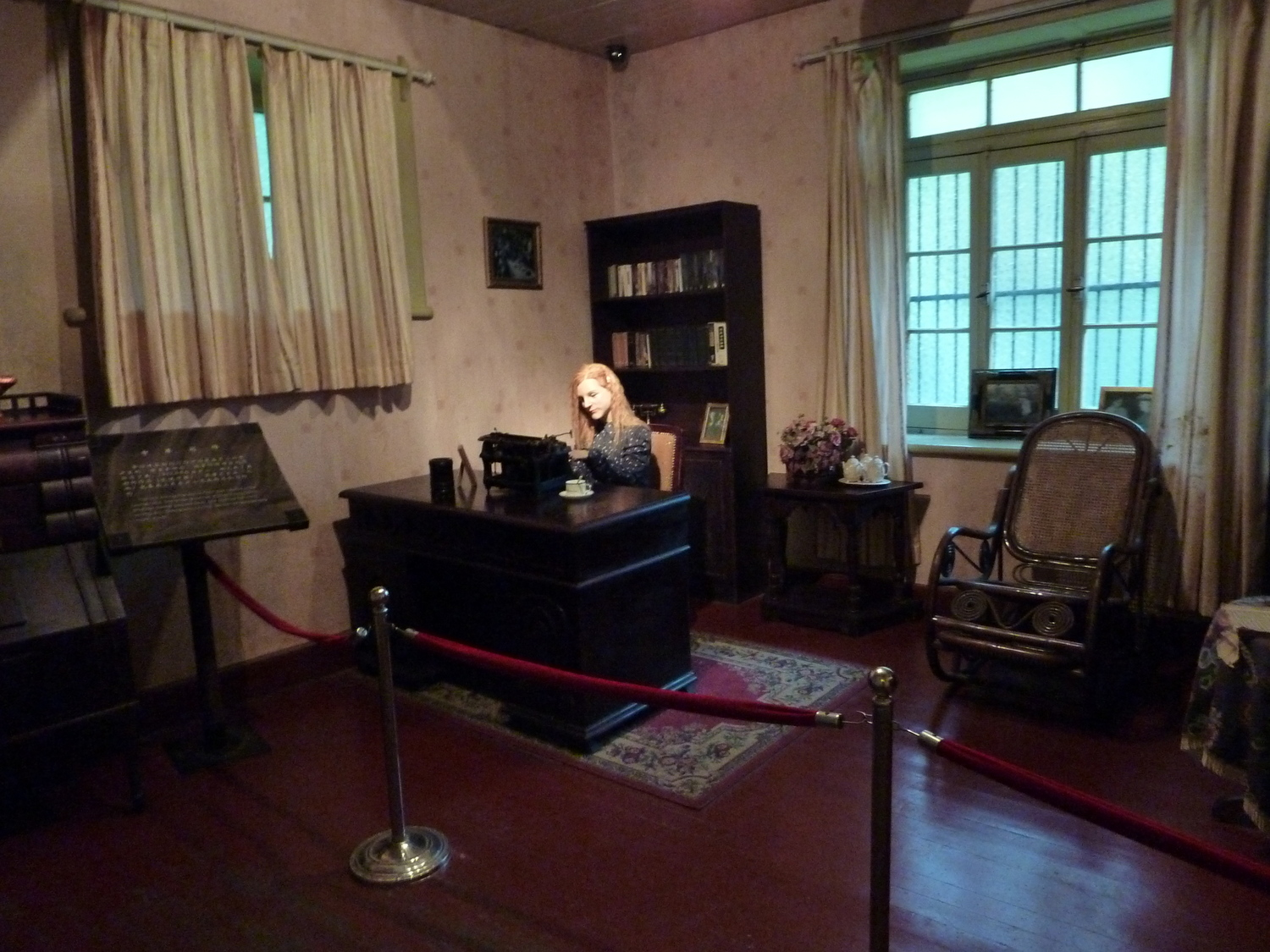
Pearl S. Buck's study in Lushan Pearl S. Buck Villa

Several historic sites work to preserve and display artifacts from Pearl's profoundly multicultural life:

- The Pearl S. Buck Summer Villa, in Kuling town, Mount Lu, Jiujiang, China
- Pearl S. Buck House in Nanjing University, China
- The Zhenjiang Pearl S. Buck Research Association and former residence in Zhenjiang, China
- Pearl S. Buck Birthplace in Hillsboro, West Virginia
- Green Hills Farm in Bucks County, Pennsylvania
- The Pearl S. Buck Memorial Hall, Bucheon City, South Korea

== See also ==
- Christian feminism
- List of female Nobel laureates
