= John Lossing Buck =

American economist (1890–1975)

- Born: November 27, 1890
- Died: September 27, 1975 (aged 84)
- Years active: 1915 – 1957
- Spouses: Pearl S. Buck (m. 1917; div. 1935): Lomay Chang Buck (m. 1941)
- Children: 4

Academic background
- Education: Cornell University (BS 1914, MS 1925, PhD 1933)

Academic work
- Discipline: Agricultural economics
- Institutions: Council of Economic and Cultural Affairs (Director of Agricultural Economics); United Nations Food and Agriculture Organization (Chief of the Land and Water Use Branch); United States Treasury (Representative in China); China-United States agricultural mission, U.S. Dept. of Agriculture (member); Department of Agricultural Economics, College of Agriculture, University of Nanking (Founder & Dept Head); American Presbyterian Mission (agricultural missionary)

John Lossing Buck (November 27, 1890 – September 27, 1975, adopted the Chinese name 卜凱) was an American agricultural economist specializing in the rural economy of China. He first went to China in 1915 as an agricultural missionary for the American Presbyterian Mission and was based in China until 1944. His wife, whom he later divorced, was Nobel Prize-winning author Pearl S. Buck.

== Biography ==
=== Youth and education ===
Buck was born in Dutchess County, New York. He graduated from Cornell University in 1914, and returned for an M.S. in 1925, and a PhD in 1933.

=== In China ===
In 1917, Buck married Pearl Sydenstricker, who subsequently became famous under her married name Pearl S. Buck. In 1920 they had a child, Carol Grace, and in 1925 adopted Janice. In 1918, Lossing, as he was known to his friends, and Pearl went to live in Zhenjiang, where Lossing began his research into the Chinese farm economy using sociological tools based on statistical surveys conducted in person. Pearl, who had grown up in China, accompanied him on his initial trips through the countryside to interpret and translate. In 1920, University of Nanking, a university sponsored by American churches, invited Lossing to create and head a Department of Agricultural Economics (the department later merged into the College of Economics and Management, Nanjing Agricultural University). Over the next twelve years he organized his students to conduct a survey of 16,786 farms and 38,256 farm families, which he analyzed in Chinese Farm Economy (University of Chicago Press, 1930), the first footnote of which cited his wife's novel The Good Earth. Buck continued the surveys, further producing a three volume study, Land Utilization in China (University of Chicago Press, 1937), one of the earliest and most extensive analyses of China's rural economy in the Republican period.

=== Later life and career ===
In 1932, The Good Earth won a Pulitzer Prize. On June 11, 1935, Pearl Buck divorced him in Reno, Nevada. In 1941, he married Lomay Chang (1908–2012) in Chengdu, China. They had two children, Rosalind, born in China, and Paul, born in the United States.

In the following years Buck served in a series of significant posts, including U.S. Treasury Representative in China, Chief of the Land and Water Use Branch of FAO (United Nations) and Director for Agricultural Economics at the Council on Economic and Cultural Affairs. After retiring in 1957, he continued giving lectures and writing, and served as a consultant for the U.S. State Department's Bureau of Educational and Cultural Affairs. Among his published works from this period included Food and Agriculture in Communist China (Praeger, 1966) which he prepared for the Hoover Institution and co-authored with Owen L. Dawson and Yuan-Li Wu.

== Assessment ==
China economists disagree on the value of Buck's surveys of the 1920s and 1930s. Some, especially those writing from a Marxist perspective, felt that Buck was too optimistic in finding that technological backwardness, not inequality of land distribution, was the main problem. They charged that Buck's students reported on their own families and villages, which naturally were more prosperous than average. Others, while conceding that Buck did not perform class analysis, questioned whether it was appropriate to read outside categories into the surveys. In any case, there is general agreement that Buck's surveys are still the most extensive ones available.
