= Dragon Seed (film) =

1944 film by Jack Conway, Harold S. Bucquet

- Theatrical release poster
- Directed by: Jack Conway; Harold S. Bucquet
- Screenplay by: Marguerite Roberts; Jane Murfin
- Based on: Dragon Seed by Pearl S. Buck
- Produced by: Pandro S. Berman
- Starring: Katharine Hepburn; Walter Huston; Aline MacMahon; Akim Tamiroff; Turhan Bey; Hurd Hatfield; J. Carrol Naish; Agnes Moorehead; Henry Travers; Robert Bice; Robert Lewis; Frances Rafferty; Jacqueline deWit
- Cinematography: Sidney Wagner
- Edited by: Harold F. Kress
- Music by: Herbert Stothart
- Production company: Metro-Goldwyn-Mayer
- Distributed by: Loew's Inc.
- Release date: July 20, 1944
- Running time: 147 minutes
- Country: United States
- Language: English
- Budget: $3 million
- Box office: $4.6 million

Dragon Seed is a 1944 American war drama film, about Japan's WWII-era actions in China. The movie directed by Jack Conway and Harold S. Bucquet, based on the 1942 novel of the same name by Pearl S. Buck. The film stars Katharine Hepburn, Walter Huston, Aline MacMahon, Akim Tamiroff, and Turhan Bey. It portrays a peaceful village in China that has been invaded by the Imperial Japanese Army during the Second Sino-Japanese War. The men in the village choose to adopt a peaceful attitude toward their conquerors, but the headstrong Jade (Hepburn) stands up to the Japanese.

Aline MacMahon was nominated for an Academy Award for Best Supporting Actress. The film continues to generate controversy for its depiction of Asian characters by White actors.

== Plot ==
A peaceful Chinese village is invaded by the Japanese prior to World War II. The men elect to adopt a peaceful attitude towards their conquerors, and the women are understood to stoically acquiesce as well, but Jade, a headstrong young woman, intends to stand up to the Japanese, whether her husband Lao Er approves or not. She even goes so far as to learn to read and to handle a weapon so that she may be properly equipped for both psychological and physical combat. Jade's attitude spreads to the rest of the village, convincing even the staunchest of male traditionalists that the Japanese can only be defeated by offering a strong united front, male and female.

== Cast ==
- Katharine Hepburn as Jade
- Walter Huston as Ling Tan
- Aline MacMahon as Ling Tan's Wife
- Akim Tamiroff as Wu Lien
- Turhan Bey as Lao Er Tan
- Hurd Hatfield as Lao San Tan
- J. Carrol Naish as Japanese kitchen overseer
- Agnes Moorehead as third cousin's wife
- Henry Travers as third cousin
- Robert Bice as Lao Ta Tan
- Robert Lewis as Captain Sato
- Frances Rafferty as Orchid Tan
- Leonard Strong as a Japanese Official
- Jacqueline deWit as Wu Lien's wife
- Clarence Lung as fourth cousin
- Paul E. Burns as Neighbor Shen
- Anna Demetrio as Wu Sao
- Lionel Barrymore as the narrator (uncredited)

== Production ==
Reportedly Judy Garland wanted the role of Jade.

== Reception ==
Film critic and author James Agee reviewed it in 1944: "Dragon Seed is an almost unimaginably bad movie." Leslie Halliwell gave it one of four stars: "Ill-advised attempt to follow the success of The Good Earth: badly cast actors mouth propaganda lines in a mechanical script which provokes more boredom and unintentional laughter than sympathy.". Leonard Maltin gave the film two and a half out of four stars in his Movie Guide: "Well-meant but overlong film...fascinating attempts at Oriental characterization."

== Box office ==
According to MGM records, the film earned $3,033,000 in the U.S. and Canada and $1,594,000 elsewhere, but, because of its high cost, it incurred a loss to the studio of $281,000.

== See also ==
- Examples of yellowface
- Whitewashing in film
- List of American films of 1944
