= King-lui Wu =

American architect

King-lui Wu (1918 – August 15, 2002) was a Chinese-American architect and professor at Yale University from 1945 to 1988.

== Life and work ==
King-lui Wu was born in Guangzhou (Canton), China in 1918. Wu's father was a businessman, but despising the work, he also pursued painting and poetry writing. As a boy, Wu attended the Lingnan Middle School in Hong Kong where he was further exposed to Western art, culture and ideas. Impressed by the engineering feats then occurring in industrializing China, he decided early in life to become an architect. In 1937, he entered the University of Michigan to begin his studies. In 1938, he transferred to Yale University, attending until 1942. He subsequently switched to Harvard University.

The graduate school of architecture at Harvard, at this time, was under the direction of Walter Gropius, former director of the Bauhaus, who had arrived in the United States in 1937. This was a transitional time for the study of architecture and design at the school. The curriculum had changed radically as Gropius invited other former Bauhaus instructors to join the faculty. Wu's classmates and instructors Marcel Breuer, Landis Gores, John Johansen and Philip Johnson would achieve fame for their subsequent groundbreaking modern work in New Canaan, Connecticut as members of the "Harvard Five." Other noted classmates included I. M. Pei, Paul Rudolph and Edward Larrabee Barnes.

After graduating with his Masters in Architecture, Wu moved back to New Haven, Connecticut in 1945 and began teaching at Yale. He also opened his own design office at 320 York Street (later moving to 75 Howe Street). His first large commission came in 1947, when he was selected to design new buildings for the Yali Middle School and the Changsha Medical Center in Changsha, China. Wu spent several months in China, charged by the trustees with the task of creating buildings that were "simple and inexpensive to construct" with a beauty being "that of grace and proportion rather than of decoration and monumental design". Wu produced designs and studies for thirty-seven new buildings that included dormitories, libraries, classrooms, medical offices and related facilities.

Wu reported on the problem of introducing new architectural forms for old China. He believed such a solution should combine "the scientific method", which he felt was "the distinctive merit of Western Civilization" with a "just conception of the ends of life", being "the distinctive merit of the Chinese". Wu believed the fusion of these two qualities would be the guiding principle for organic growth in creating new forms. The conflict inherent in the architectural synthesis of these two distinct cultures was one often repeated by Wu. He called this the "battle between the head and the heart". Throughout his creative work, Wu sought to integrate the Western enthrallment with technology, as seen in rationalism of the Bauhaus, with Chinese romanticism, as in his belief in the intrinsic calming aspect of the home expressed in his preference for the warmth of organic materials, natural light and picturesque views. The Chinese Civil War ultimately halted the project, which never moved beyond the design phase.

The 1950s were a prolific time for the architect. The young professor's ideas attracted the attention of members of the academic community, who typically possessed more open-mindedness than money. Wu designed some of his finest works, relying on architectural creativity rather than large budgets to create beauty. In addition to the Rouse house, he designed the cruciform DuPont House with its interior courtyard; a virtual one-room house raised into the side of a hill for Albertus Magnus College professor Dorothea Rudnick; a small brick house with covered patio that neatly included a private rental apartment for psychologist Maria Rickers in Storrs; and an unbuilt house and carport that presented a blank façade to the street in crowded New Haven for Dr. Delgado. Nearly all of these works combined huge expanses of plate glass, wood siding and a variety of natural materials. Floor plans were open and flowing with public façades that exuded mystery and privacy.

Highlights of his 1960s work include the urban clubhouse for the Manuscript Society, one of Yale's secret societies, and the only one with a modern building. This structure, along with houses for Dr. Andrew Wong and New York advertising executive Frank Stephenson were published in the architectural press. By now, the earlier rectilinear plans had evolved into more complex forms, with brick and rough textured block replacing wood for siding and structure. Ceiling heights were varied, and interior room configuration was impossible to discern from the outside. Wu continued to use large, fixed expanses of plate glass and relied on moveable openings on window sills for natural ventilation, as he had done in the earlier houses. He used skylights and the changing of daylight for effect. The meeting of interior planes was emphasized by the use of either wood trim in some houses or recessed negative joints in others.

Wu's work evolved, yet certain themes remained. His single-family houses typically revolved around a central core (or courtyard as in DuPont) from which all rooms emanated. He frequently used changes of room height to follow terrain or define space. Windows dominated, at times seeming to reach toward the light, often rising above the roofline to do so. The neat, rhythmic pattern of glass in the early houses evolved into an often incomprehensible and varied placement of windows of various sizes and shapes in the later work. Large expanses of glass remained a constant. Indeed, one of Wu's long-running courses at Yale, "Daylight and Architecture" emphasized his belief that daylight was "the most noble of natural phenomena".

Like many modern architects of the time, Wu strove for total design of the home. When budgets and clients permitted, he designed furniture for his houses. Chairs and tables utilized planar surfaces with arms and legs integrated into their structure. Upholstery was simple and non-patterned. In at least one house, the Johnson, the woven textiles of Anni Albers were used for curtains.

Wu continued to both teach and design and twice received Architectural Record magazine's Distinguished House Award, in 1966 for the Paul Johnson residence and again in 1975 for the Adrienne Suddard house (although mystifyingly the house was planned, constructed and previously published several years earlier in 1971). His last published work was the small country house for longtime client, T. C. Hsu, in 1976.

In the late 1970s and after living in New Haven for 32 years, Wu finally designed and constructed a home for himself and his family. Located on a corner lot in a developed residential area, the white aggregate block walls of the Wu house reveal little of the rich interiors within. After passing through two imposing entry doors, the visitor steps into a two-story foyer. Upon climbing a short set of open-treaded stairs, one reaches a central living area, lit by skylights. It is filled with simple, rectilinear wood furniture designed by Wu. There are no hallways; all other rooms in the house are reached from the corners of this central interior room. Stark white walls, trimmed with wood at the joints, are typical Wu features.

In 1979, Wu followed similar principles in his smallest residential assignment: designing a rear addition for the house of his friends, Theodore Pian and Rulan Chao Pian, sited on a small lot on a private way of early-modern houses at 14 Brattle Circle, off Brattle Street in Cambridge, Massachusetts. (The plans for this small residential expansion fortunately survive with their descendants.) In this new addition, unusually large windows, sited around a small but comfortable spiral stairway, bring remarkable light to the existing living room, as well as to the new kitchen and finished basement of this otherwise un-sunlit early-modern home, originally constructed during the dark war years of 1942–3.

In 1988, Wu retired, after teaching at Yale for 43 years. Paul Goldberger, his former student and then New York Times architecture critic wrote:

"Your continued presence has been the one thing on which students, faculty, alumni and observers of the School could count. But it is more than just your physical presence—I think you have given generations of students a sense that the practice of architecture was a matter of integrity and commitment and not of frivolity. You have brought students into a heavy and profound world without being heavy-handed yourself, and I think they have come out of it feeling that architecture has a sense of grace."

King-lui Wu died of pneumonia in 2002. He was remembered as "one of the great threads of the school", by Dean Robert A. M. Stern. In addition to Stern himself, other former Wu students include leading architects Stanley Tigerman, Maya Lin, Norman Foster, Richard Rodgers, and Hugh Newell Jacobsen. Paul Goldberger wrote, "His long, quiet tenure and courtly manner contrasted with a changing cast of large and sometimes clashing egos on the faculty." "I don't think the school of architecture would have maintained its stability if it wasn't for him," said Charles Gwathmey, another former student. "Really, he was the rock through all the transitions, all the ups and downs."
