= How to Cook and Eat in Chinese =

Chinese cookbook

- First edition
- Illustrator: Calligraphy by Yuen Ren Chao
- Series: An Asia Press Book
- Genre: Cookbook
- Publisher: John Day Company
- Publication date: 1945
- Publication place: United States
- Pages: 262
- Followed by: How to Order and Eat in Chinese

How to Cook and Eat in Chinese is a cookbook and introduction to Chinese cuisine and food culture by Buwei Yang Chao. It was first published in 1945, and appeared in revised and expanded editions in 1949 and 1956; the third and final edition appeared in 1968. It has been called "the first truly insightful English-language Chinese cookbook", Yang Chao introduced new dishes and recipes that she collected in China but adapted them for preparation in an American kitchen. Sections also describe meal systems, cooking techniques, and materials. The book emerged in collaboration with her husband, Yuen Ren Chao, and daughter, Rulan Chao Pian, and coined the commonly used English terms for Chinese cooking techniques such as "stir fry" and "pot stickers".

Pearl S. Buck, at that time the most widely read American author on the subject of China, wrote in her Preface to the book that she wanted to nominate Yang Chao for the Nobel Peace Prize: "what better road to universal peace is there than to gather around the table where new and delicious dishes are set forth, dishes which, though yet untasted by us, we are destined to enjoy and love?"

== Background ==
During World War II, Chao's husband, Yuen Ren Chao, ran the Special Language Training Program at Harvard University to teach Chinese to U.S. military personnel. Each night the instructors gathered at the Chao home to prepare the teaching material for the next day, sometimes late into the night. Yang Chao developed a repertoire of dishes to feed them that could be prepared in an American kitchen using ingredients from local groceries. Agnes Hocking, wife of Harvard professor William Ernest Hocking and Chao's friend for many years, subsequently told her to write the book.

Her "Author's Note" explains she was "ashamed" to have written it, first because as a medical doctor she should have been practicing medicine, second: "I didn't write the book". She goes on to explain how she, her daughter Rulan and her husband collaborated:

The way I didn’t was like this. You know I speak little English and write less. So I cooked my dishes in Chinese, my daughter Rulan put my Chinese into English, and my husband, finding the English dull, put much of it back into Chinese again.

Jason Epstein, who met the Chaos when he edited the revised and enlarged edition of the book, remembered that Buwei Yang Chao did not speak or write much English. He wrote "it is obvious from the text that the professor wrote the entire book in his wife's name, using her recipes," that is, "pretending to be his wife…" However, Yuen Ren later told an interviewer that Rulan did the translation: "She would complain sometimes, 'Daddy, you have so many footnotes. Somebody will think that you translated the book,' not that she was the translator".

In 1974, Buwei and her daughter Lensey Namioka published How To Order and Eat in Chinese, a guide to eating in Chinese restaurants.

== Structure and contents ==
The cookbook is organized on the same scheme as Y. R. Chao's Mandarin Primer, the text he prepared for the wartime Army language program. Just as each chapter of the Primer is organized into numbered paragraphs and sub-numbered sections, each chapter of recipes is numbered, and each recipe sub-numbered. Chapter Fourteen is “Vegetables,” and “14.19” is “Stirred Dandelion.” Part One, “Cooking and Eating,” like the opening grammatical section in Mandarin Primer, is a taxonomy.

The book, comments the food author Anne Mendelson, "never claims to be presenting an encyclopedic, region-by-region picture of Chinese cuisine in all its vastness and complexity", but evokes the "shape and feeling of the major Chinese cooking techniques and putting them to simple use in her recipes". The ingredients are generally limited to those available in the local markets in larger cities, though soy sauce, scallions, and sherry are used in most recipes. Fresh ginger is called for "if you can get it".

Part One, "Cooking and Eating", begins with Chapter I "Introduction", and a description of "Meal Systems". This section includes an account of the types of meals eaten in different parts of China by different classes of people and explains the difference between a meal — "fan, a period of rice" — and a snack — dian xin "something to dot the heart". Chao describes the customary behavior, for instance at the end of a banquet, with what Janet Theophano calls "a spirit of frivolity and playfulness".

Individual chapters then deal with "Eating Materials", "Cooking Materials", "Cooking and Eating Utensils", "Methods of Readying", and "Methods of Cooking". Chapter V, "Methods of Readying" has sub-sections on "Cleaning", "Cutting, Picking etc.", "Mixing and Fixing", and "Precooking". Precise directions tell how to perform such tasks as "rolling knife pieces" (Chinese: 滾刀塊; pinyin: gǔn dāo kuài) on a carrot or other crisp vegetable. There are detailed descriptions, observations, and directives on these cooking techniques.

Sometimes humor colors the description, as with that of chao (炒 chǎo), for which Chao created the English term "stir-fry":

with its aspiration, low-rising tone and all, cannot be accurately translated into English. Roughly speaking, ch'ao may be defined as a big-fire-shallow-fat-continual-stirring-quick-frying of cut-up material with wet seasoning. So we shall call it stir fry...

Part II is given over to recipes, including chapters on Red-Cook Meat, Meat Slices, Meat Shreds, Beef, Chicken, Duck, Fish, Vegetables, Soups, Pots, Sweet Things, and Pastry. A final chapter is "Meals and Menus".

== Reception and commentary ==
The New York Times review of the 1945 first edition called it "something novel in the way of a cook book" and said that it "strikes us as being an authentic account of the Chinese culinary system, which is every bit as complicated as the culture that has produced it".

Later writers have seen the work as more than a collection of recipes. The American food writer Anne Mendelson calls How To Cook and Eat in Chinese "a vast departure from previous attempts to teach Chinese cooking to Americans". One historian sees the book as part of the larger story of cultural relations between the United States and China during the Open Door period.

Janet Theophano wrote that How to Cook and Eat in Chinese is "more than a cookbook: It is the stage on which Yang Chao unfolds a personal, family, and cultural drama." The book is a "double act of translation", she explains, for it interprets the techniques of Chinese cooking and the etiquette of eating Chinese meals for an American audience" and it "mirrors the act of translation required of immigrants adjusting to their adopted countries". Readers "also travel with Mrs. Chao on this more personal journey as she succinctly narrates her affectionate, sometimes tense, relationship with her family and the life experiences that compelled her to author this book".

== Selected editions ==
- Yang Chao, Buwei (1945). How to Cook and Eat in Chinese. New York: John Day. OCLC 710009154.
- ——— (1949). How to Cook and Eat in Chinese. New York: John Day Co. OCLC 50475193. 262 pp. Internet Archive Online
- ——— (1956). How to Cook and Eat in Chinese. London: Faber & Faber.
- ——— (1963). How to Cook and Eat in Chinese. New York: John Day.
- ——— (1972) [1970, Random House]. How to Cook and Eat in Chinese (3rd, rev. & enlarged ed.). New York: Vintage. ISBN 0-394-71703-1 – via HathiTrust.
- ———; Chao, Lensie (1974). How to Order and Eat in Chinese to Get the Best Meal in a Chinese Restaurant. New York: Vintage Books. ISBN 0-39471983-2.
- ——— (1981). Quick & Easy Chinese Cooking. Toronto: Coles Cook Books.
- 杨, 步伟 (2017) [2016], 中国食谱 [Zhongguo shi pu], tr. 柳建树 [Jianshu Liu]; 秦甦 [Su Qin], Beijing: 九州出版社 [Jiu zhou chu ban she].
