= James Haar =

American musicologist (1929–2018)

James Haar (July 4, 1929 – September 15, 2018) was an American musicologist and W.R. Kenan Jr. Professor Emeritus of Music at the University of North Carolina at Chapel Hill. A specialist in Renaissance music, he was the Editor-in-chief of the Journal of the American Musicological Society from 1966 to 1969 and served as the president of American Musicological Society from 1976 to 1978. He was elected a member of the American Academy of Arts and Sciences in 1987.

Haar was born in St. Louis, Missouri. He received his BA from Harvard in 1950 and his MA from the University of North Carolina at Chapel Hill in 1954. He returned to Harvard to complete his PhD under John Ward and Nino Pirrotta, graduating in 1961. His doctoral dissertation, Musica mundana: Variations on a Pythagorean Theme, explored the ancient belief in musica universalis and its effect on musical thought in the Middle Ages and early Renaissance. It remains one of the standard works on the subject.

His teaching career began at Harvard (1960–1967), followed by the University of Pennsylvania (1967–1969), and then New York University, where he was appointed a professor in the music department in 1969 and served as chair of the department from 1971 to 1977. In 1978, he was appointed Professor of Music at the University of North Carolina at Chapel Hill, where he remained for the rest of his academic career.

The Science and Art of Renaissance Music, a collection of some of Haar's key essays and studies written over three decades, was published by Princeton University Press in 1998.
