= Ties That Bind, Ties That Break =

Book by Lensey Namioka

- Author: Lensey Namioka
- Language: English
- Genre: Historical
- Publisher: Laurel Leaf
- Publication date: January 1, 1999
- Publication place: United States
- Media type: Print (hardback & paperback)
- Pages: 154 (hardback & paperback)
- ISBN: 9780385326667 (hardback edition) & ISBN 9780440415992 (paperback edition)
- OCLC: 46432346

Ties That Bind, Ties That Break is a young adult novel by Lensey Namioka, published in 1999. The novel tells the story of a girl who defied tradition in China in the early 1900s and later moved to the United States. It received the Washington State Book Award in 2000. A sequel, An Ocean Apart, A World Away, follows the story of Ailin's friend, Xueyan.

== Plot overview ==
Tao Ailin is born into the Tao family when China is in great turmoil. Her story is told in a flashback; as a young woman, she meets her childhood fiance, Hanwei, again and recalls how she became the wife of James Chew, a Chinese restaurant owner in San Francisco.

In 1911, Ailin is a spirited girl from a strict family and is expected to have her feet bound in preparation for marriage. Foreigners in China gradually erode the traditions of the Chinese empire by introducing Western philosophies; Ailin's father is one such man to perceive that the rules that have preserved the power of the Chinese empire will not last much longer.

When Ailin is five, she is engaged to Liu Hanwei, a 7-year-old boy who is to be educated in a Western school. They become friends, especially when Hanwei promises to teach her all the things he learns in public school. They are a well-matched pair and their families become close; Ailin is fortunate that her future mother-in-law genuinely likes Ailin. However, when the time comes for Ailin's feet to be bound, she refuses and the engagement is broken off. Ailin's father accepts Ailin's desire to keep her feet unbound, despite the fact it will make it harder for her to marry, and it will make life harder for her in general.

When she grows older, her father sends Ailin to a Western public school called Macintosh, where Ailin learns many of the things that Hanwei once promised to teach her. Ailin is an exceptional student, especially in English lessons since she has the ability to imitate any language perfectly, and her teacher, Miss Gilbertson, grants her the English name "Eileen." She also finds a friend, a girl with unbound feet named Xueyan (also known as Sheila), a student who has ambitions to become a doctor. However, Ailin's education becomes a point of difficulty for the rest of her family, as educated girls are also undesirable for marriage and the school fees are expensive.

Ailin's father dies of tuberculosis when she is twelve and she loses the only support she has in her family and cannot continue with school any longer. Unable to find a man willing to marry her, her uncle, her father's older brother and the head of the family since Ailin's grandmother died of a paralyzing stroke, offers her two choices: she either becomes a concubine by marrying a farmer, or becomes a nun. Ailin chooses none of the given options and is thrown out of the family, saved from her uncle's wrath only out of his respect and love for Ailin's father. With the help of Miss Gilbertson, Ailin finds work as an amah (governess) for the Warners, an American family. When the Warner family moves briefly to the United States, Ailin leaves Shanghai with them with the blessings of her uncle.

While on the boat, Ailin has to take care of the Warner children. On the boat to California, Ailin meets a young man named James Chew and they fall in love. When the Warners decide to return to China, Ailin chooses to remain in California to marry James and help him run his restaurant. Years later, Hanwei appears in the restaurant, reunited with Ailin for the second time since their engagement was broken. After Ailin relates her story to Hanwei, he reveals that his mother, who broke off their engagement, eventually relented and would have let Hanwei marry Ailin and she could have lived in comfort. While Ailin admits her life has not been easy, she is happy and proud of the choices she made in her life.
