= Lensey Namioka =

Chinese-born American writer (born 1929)

- Born: 14 June 1929 (age 97); Beijing, China
- Occupation: Writer
- Years active: 1976-2006
- Notable work: Ties that Bind, Ties that Break
- Spouse: Isaac Namioka
- Children: Aki, Michi
- Parent(s): Buwei Yang Chao, Yuen Ren Chao
- Relatives: Rulan Chao Pian

Lensey Namioka (née Chao) (simplified Chinese: 赵来思; traditional Chinese: 趙來思; pinyin: Zhào Láisī or simplified Chinese: 赵莱痕思媚; traditional Chinese: 趙萊痕思媚; pinyin: Zhào Lénsèi; born June 14, 1929) is a Chinese-born American writer of books for young adults and children. She writes about China and Chinese American families, as well as Japan, her husband's native country.

== Early life and education ==
Lensey Chao attended Radcliffe College and the University of California, Berkeley, where her father Yuen Ren Chao was a professor of Asian Studies, to study mathematics. Here she met and married Isaac Namioka, a fellow graduate student who was born in Japan. Namioka ended up earning a bachelor's and a master's degree in math.

=== Origin of her first name ===
Lensey Namioka is the only Chinese person to have the first name "Lensey". Her name has an especially unusual property: there are no Chinese characters corresponding to it. When Lensey's father was cataloging all of the syllables used in Chinese, he noted that there were two that were possible but not in use. These syllables could be written (in Gwoyeu Romatzyh) as len and sey (Pinyin: lén, sèi). His third daughter was born soon after, so he named her "Lensey." 趙萊痕思媚 is a compromise representation in characters using fanqie principles, and Fu Ssu-nien would give her the more convenient name 趙來思 (Zhào Láisī), derived from the Book of Odes.

== Awards and recognition ==
Namioka has won many awards for her work. For instance, Ties that Bind, Ties that Break was named one of the American Library Association's 10 Best Books for Young People, and also won the California Young Reader Medal and the Washington State Governor's Writers Award.

== Bibliography ==
- Japan: Traveler's Companion (1979)
- China: A Traveler's Companion (1985)
- Phantom Tiger Mountain (1986)
- Who's Hu (1988)
- April and the Dragon Lady (1994)
- The Loyal Cat (1995)
- The Laziest Boy in the World (1998)
- Ties That Bind, Ties That Break (1999)
- The Hungriest Boy in the World (2001)
- An Ocean Apart, A World Away (2002)
- Half and Half (2003)
- Mismatch (2006)
- Yang Family Series
  - Yang the Youngest and His Terrible Ear (1992)
  - Yang the Third and Her Impossible Family (1995)
  - Yang the Second and Her Secret Admirers (1998)
  - Yang the Eldest and His Odd Jobs (2000)
- Zenta and Matsuzo Mysteries
  - The Samurai And The Long-Nosed Devils (1976)
  - White Serpent Castle (1976)
  - Valley of the Broken Cherry Trees (1980)
  - The Village Of The Vampire Cat (1981)
  - Island of Ogres (1989)
  - The Coming of the Bear (1992)
  - Den of the White Fox (1997)
