= Buwei Yang Chao =

Chinese-American physician and writer (1889–1981)

Buwei Yang Chao (née Yang Buwei; simplified Chinese: 杨步伟; traditional Chinese: 楊步偉; pinyin: Yáng Bùwěi; 1889–1981) was a Chinese-American physician and writer. She was one of the first women to practice Western medicine in China. She was married to linguist Yuen Ren Chao.

== Life and early education ==
Yang was born in Nanjing into the Yang family, but was raised by her aunt and uncle. At a very young age, she was sent to a school in Nanjing. The entry exam of the school required her to write about the benefits of educating girls. She responded: "Women are the mothers of all citizens". Later she went to an all-girls Roman Catholic school in Shanghai, and later went to Japan to attend the Tokyo Women's Medical College.

== Medical career ==
Yang moved to Tokyo for studies in medicine. She later claimed that she only became interested in cooking after finding Japanese food to be inedible. She was also annoyed by what she perceived as the arrogance of the Japanese, stating that they made her studies difficult in Tokyo.

In 1919, she returned home at the request of her father, who died before she could see him. She and Li Guanzhong established the Sen Ren Hospital, specialising in gynecology. She was amongst the first female doctors practicing Western-style medicine in China.

== Marriage and family ==
In 1920, she met and subsequently married the linguist Y.R. Chao on June 1, 1921. The witnesses were Hu Shih and one other friend. Hu's account of this simple ceremony in the next day's newspapers described the couple as a model of modern marriage for China's New Culture generation. The Chaos had four daughters; the eldest, Rulan Chao (趙如蘭), helped with the writing of her book of recipes. Their third daughter is children's book author and mathematician Lensey Namioka.

== Career as author ==
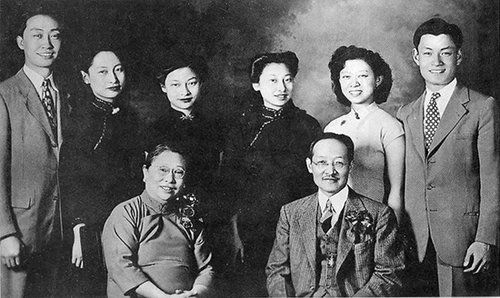
Chao family poses for a picture during their 25th wedding anniversary.

Buwei Yang Chao wrote three books, two of which were notable: How to Cook and Eat in Chinese and An Autobiography of a Chinese Woman.

=== Chinese recipe development and book ===
How to Cook and Eat in Chinese was written when Buwei and Yuen Ren lived in Cambridge, Massachusetts during World War II. Yuen Ren was conducting language training for the US Army and Buwei would prepare meals for the instructors using local ingredients. With the help of her daughter Rulan, she prepared over two hundred and thirty recipes. Some came from her travels with her husband as he collected dialect data from across China and often they lived with the subjects of Yuen Ren's language research. Though the recipes from those days were not written down, she often recreated them from her memory of their taste. Buwei opens the book by saying "I didn't write the book":

The way I didn't was like this. You know I speak little English and write less. So I cooked my dishes in Chinese, my daughter Rulan put my Chinese into English, and my husband finding the English dull, put much of it back into Chinese again.

=== English terms for Chinese recipe terminology ===
Together with her husband, Buwei Yang Chao coined the terms "pot sticker" and "stir fry" for her Chinese recipe book, terms which are now widely accepted. Jason Epstein of The New York Times, who later met the couple as publisher of a reprint of the book, claims that as the author could not speak or write much English, it must have been her husband who wrote in her name. However, Yuen Ren told an interviewer that Rulan did the translation: "She would complain sometimes, 'Daddy, you have so many footnotes. Somebody will think that you translated the book,' not that she was the translator."

=== Autobiography and Chinese restaurant guide ===
Her second book, An Autobiography of a Chinese Woman: Put Into English By Her Husband Yuenren Chao, recounted the eventful life she led prior to her meeting her future husband and their travels together. Both books were first published by The John Day Company, New York. She also wrote a third book: How to Order and Eat in Chinese to Get the Best Meal in a Chinese Restaurant (1974).

== Sources ==
- Chao, Buwei Yang (1945). How to Cook and Eat in Chinese. New York: John Day. OCLC 1459736.
- -- Za Ji Zhao Jia 雜記趙家 (Taibei Shi: Zhuan ji wen xue chu ban she, 1972)
- -- Autobiography of a Chinese Woman, Put into English by her husband Yuenren Chao, (NY: John Day, 1947; Reprinted: Westport, CT: Greenwood Press, 1970). HathiTrust Free online.
- Chao, Yuen Ren (1977), Chinese linguist, phonologist, composer and author: oral history transcript / and related material, 1974-1977," "China Scholars Series, Interviewed by Levenson, Rosemary, University of California, Berkeley
- Feng, Jin (2011). "With This Lingo, I Thee Wed: Language and Marriage in Autobiography of a Chinese Woman". Journal of American-East Asian Relations. 18 (3–4): 235–247. doi:10.1163/187656111X610719. ISSN 1058-3947.
- Hayford, Charles W. (2012). "Open Recipes Openly Arrived At: Mrs Chao's How to Cook and Eat in Chinese (1945) and the Translation of Chinese Food". Journal of Oriental Studies. 45 (1–2): 67–87.
