= Anne Mendelson =

Anne Mendelson is an American food journalist and culinary historian. She lives in Hudson County, New Jersey, with her cat, and believes that the medley of ethnic cooking in her neighborhood, combined with memories from her childhood in rural Pennsylvania, provided inspiration for her writing.

== Life ==
Mendelson left her studies of the medieval world for the world of food, beginning her culinary career as a cook book reviewer for Bon Appétit. She later became a staff editor at Cuisine, and from there began freelancing, specializing in culinary writing. She has participated in translating cookbooks from German to English, served as an editorial consultant for cookbook authors, and became deeply involved in the field of culinary history. Her expertise was called upon in 2004, when she was asked to contribute to the Oxford Encyclopedia of Food and Drink in America. In 2010, she was awarded a Guggenheim Fellowship. Mendelson helped to found the Culinary Historians of New York. In 2007, she was awarded the Sophie Coe Prize in Food History at the Oxford Symposium on Food and Cookery. Her essay was published in Gastropolis, a collection of New York food-related essays, published by Columbia University Press in fall 2008.

Mendelson has also written cookbooks. Together with Zerela Martinez, chef and restaurateur, she has collaborated three such books: Food From My Heart (Macmillan 1992), The Food and Life of Oaxaca (Macmillan 1997), and Zarela’s Veracruz (Houghton Mifflin, 2001). Stand Facing the Stove, of which she is the sole author, was published in 1997 by Henry Holt and told the story of Irma Rombauer and Marion Rombauer Becker, the women responsible for writing The Joy of Cooking. The book was called “probably the most important book on American food published this year” by Russ Parsons of the Los Angeles Times. Her work, Milk: The Surprising Story of Milk Through the Ages was published by Knopf was published in fall 2008. Mendelson served as contributing editor at Gourmet, and has been called upon as a cookbook reviewer for the New York Times Dining section.

== Works ==
Books

- (with Zarela Martínez) Zarela's Veracruz, Houghton Mifflin, 2001
- —— (1996). Stand Facing the Stove: The Story of the Women Who Gave America the Joy of Cooking. New York: Holt.
- —— (2008). Milk: The Surprising Story of Milk Through The Ages: With 120 Adventurous Recipes That Explore The Riches of Our First Food. Alfred A. Knopf. ISBN 978-1-4000-4410-8.
- —— (2016). Chow Chop Suey : Food and the Chinese American Journey. New York: Columbia University Press. ISBN 9780231158602.
- —— (2023). Spoiled: The Myth of Milk as Superfood. New York: Columbia University Press. ISBN 978-0231188180.

Journalism

- A Green Thought in a Black Shade; the Guest Word., The New York Times, 9 June 1974. Accessed 23 July 2008
- Eat Drink Make Revolution: the Cuisine of Hunan Province. Dining and Wine, The New York Times, 14 Mar. 2007. Accessed 23 July 2008
- Mapping the Myriad Tastes of the ‘Other China’, The New York Times, 2 July 2008. Accessed 23 July 2008
