= Theodore Pian =

American engineer

Theodore Hsueh-Huang Pian (Chinese: 卞學鐄; 19 January 1919 – 20 June 2009) was a Chinese-born American engineer.

A Shanghai native, born on 18 January 1919, Pian grew up in Tianjin, where he attended Nankai Middle School, and graduated from Tsinghua University in 1940. He began working in aerospace engineering in Kunming, Yunnan, terminals of the Burma Road. Pian left China for the United States in 1943, earning a master's degree in aeronautics and astronautics from the Massachusetts Institute of Technology the next year, after which he worked for Curtiss Airplane Division and served in the United States Marine Corps. In 1945, he married Rulan Chao. Theodore Pian joined the MIT faculty, shortly after graduating from the institution with a doctorate in aeronautics and astronautics in 1948. He retired in 1990, but remained an adviser to many Chinese students. Over the course of his career, Pian was elected a member of the United States National Academy of Engineering and Academia Sinica. He died in Cambridge, Massachusetts on 20 June 2009, aged 90.
