= Rulan Chao Pian =

American musicologist

Rulan Chao Pian 卞趙如蘭
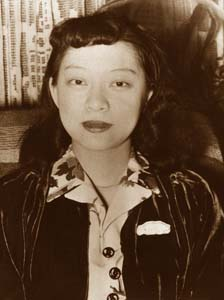
- Pian in 1942
- Born: April 20, 1922; Cambridge, Massachusetts, U.S.
- Died: November 30, 2013 (aged 91); Cambridge, Massachusetts, U.S.
- Known for: Study of music in China, Chinese opera.
- Spouse: Theodore Pian (m. 1945; died 2009)
- Scientific career
- Fields: Ethnomusicology, Asian studies
- Institutions: Harvard University

Rulan Chao Pian (Note: simplified Chinese: 卞赵如兰; traditional Chinese: 卞趙如蘭; pinyin: Biàn Zhào Rúlán) (née Rulan Chao; April 20, 1922 – November 30, 2013), was an ethnomusicologist and scholar of Chinese language and literature and was one of the first ten female full professors in the Faculty of Arts and Sciences at Harvard University. She was born and died in Cambridge, Massachusetts.

== Biography ==
Rulan Chao Pian was born in 1922 to a prominent Chinese family: her parents, the linguist Yuen Ren Chao and the physician and food writer Buwei Yang Chao, had resided in Cambridge since 1920, after her father was appointed to the faculty at Harvard. After travels in China and France, the family returned to the United States, traveling to Hawaii, New Haven, and Washington D.C. She studied some piano as a youth, though frequent travels made this difficult.

Pian enrolled in Radcliffe College where she received a Bachelor of Arts and Masters of Arts in music history (Western music) in 1943 (dated 1944) and 1946, respectively, and a Ph.D. in both East Asian Languages and in Music in 1960. Her music instructors included Archibald T. Davison, Edward Ballantine, John Ward, and Walter Piston. She taught at Harvard continuously from 1947 beginning as a teaching assistant in Chinese language, before being promoted to instructor and lecturer.

In 1974, she became Professor in the Department of Music and the Department of East Asian Languages and Civilizations. She was one of three tenured female professors in the Harvard Music Department, one of thirteen total in the entire Faculty of Arts and Sciences. In 1945, she married Theodore Pian, later a Professor of Aeronautics and Astronautics at MIT with whom she had a daughter, Canta Chao-po Pian. With Theodore, in 1975 she became co-master of Harvard's South House (now Cabot House), the first non-white housemasters in Harvard history. Pian was also one of the first female housemasters; a portrait of her with Chinese musical instruments hangs in the house. She retired from Harvard in 1992, but continued to teach students individually in her home, some of whom lived with her upon their arrival from China, such as the composer Lei Liang who credits her as one of his most important mentors and musical influences.

With her father, she edited and translated her mother's How to Cook and Eat in Chinese, the book responsible for inventing and introducing the terms stir fry and pot sticker into English.

== Death ==
Pian died of pulmonary fibrosis. After her death, she was widely eulogized in various obituaries. A memorial at Harvard was held on March 30, 2014 and an exhibition in her memory was held at Chinese University of Hong Kong.

== Professional work and honors ==
Rulan Pian was the author of Song Dynasty Musical Sources and Their Interpretation (published by Harvard University Press, 1967) which won the 1968 Otto Kinkeldey Award from the American Musicological Society for the most distinguished book in musicology, one of three winners dedicated to the study of non-western music. Other publications focused on Peking opera and drum songs. She played many western and non-western instruments, including the piano, chyn, koto, biwa, ryuteki, and various Indonesian gamelan instruments.

In Chinese language studies she is known for her A Syllabus to the Mandarin Primer among other publications. She was one of the founders of the Conference on Chinese Oral and Performing Literature, CHINOPERL. Her work was among the first to take into account the importance of tonal inflections, rhythm, and other traditionally "musical" inflections in the study of oral literature.

Pian was a Fellow of the Academia Sinica in Taiwan. She was named an Honorary Member of the Society for Ethnomusicology, the society's highest honor, in 2004. A Festschrift, The Musicological Juncture: Essays in Honor of Rulan Chao Pian, ed. Bell Yung and Joseph S. C. Lam was published by Harvard University in 1994.

Her papers are housed in the University Library System of the Chinese University of Hong Kong. A list of her publications is available on the library's website.
