= John Milton Ward IV =

American musicologist (1917–2011)

John Milton Ward IV (July 6, 1917 in Oakland, California – December 12, 2011 in Cambridge, Massachusetts) was a musicologist and scholar of Renaissance music, world music and folk music. He was the William Powell Mason Professor of Music at Harvard University from 1961 to 1985.

== Biography ==
Ward's memories of growing up in Oakland included his father John Milton Ward II, a physician, treating survivors of the 1906 San Francisco earthquake. Ward attended San Francisco Junior College, and then San Francisco State College. He received a Master of Music from the University of Washington in 1942, and a Doctor of Philosophy in 1953 from New York University with a dissertation entitled The 'Vihuela de mano' and its Music (1536-1576). His teachers were Otto Gombosi, Curt Sachs, Gustave Reese and George Herzog, and he took private composition lessons with Darius Milhaud. Prior to Harvard he taught at Michigan State University and the University of Illinois.

He married Ruth Neils in 1945 and was predeceased by her in 2004. He died peacefully at home, and is buried in Mount Auburn Cemetery, on Harvard Hill. A memorial was held at Harvard University on May 6, 2012, with performances by lutenist Douglas Freundlich and the Pinewoods Morris Men.

== Professional work and honors ==
John Ward was the author of many articles on folk dance and Renaissance music. He also published editions of the Dublin Virginal Manuscript and the lute works of John Johnson.

Ward taught at Harvard continuously from 1955 to 1985. Among his course offerings that first year was a seminar, unusual for the time, on Claudio Monteverdi, culminating in a performance of Il ballo delle ingrate in the courtyard of the Fogg Art Museum. His courses would eventually span film music, music in Native American ceremony, Peking opera, Noh and jazz. Several of these were taught in collaboration with his former student and long-time colleague Rulan Chao Pian. Typically, Ward's courses in what he called "MOWFAT," or "Music Outside the Western Fine Art Tradition," were not named by geographical region but instead combined music with other disciplines: "Music and Drama," "Music and Ritual." While his interests were wide-ranging, a constant in his own scholarly work and in his teaching was attention to detail, both stylistic and substantive.

In 1976 he established Harvard's first formal collection of audio material relating to non-Western music. Initially consisting entirely of commercial and field recordings Ward had acquired in his travels, the Archive of World Music moved to the Eda Kuhn Loeb Music Library in 1992 and continues to develop in support of ethnomusicological research at Harvard. The collection's principal areas of coverage are the musics of the Middle East, Asia and Africa. Upon retirement John Ward concentrated his energies on building and curating an important collection for Harvard University. Growing from Ward's interest in primary sources for music and ballet, the Ward Collection at Harvard Library reflects a post-structuralist belief in "the infinite variability of performance": Ward sought to acquire multiple iterations of works, insisting that even apparently identical printings, for instance, could differ in small but significant ways. He sought signs of use, explaining that these show "the hand of the performers: how they worked, what was important to them, and even sometimes (if we are lucky) how they adapted the music to their own talents, or contemporary musical styles." Subjects with particularly strong representation in the Ward Collection are music of the French Revolution, the King's Theatre and the Strauss family.

One Festschrift, Music and Context: Essays for John M. Ward, edited by Anne Dhu McLucas (née Shapiro), was published by Harvard University immediately upon Ward's retirement in 1985. Another, John Ward and His Magnificent Collection, edited by Gordon Hollis, was published by Golden Legend in 2010.

His papers are housed at Harvard University's Houghton Library, where two staff members are employed full-time to catalog Ward Collection materials. The John M. Ward Fellowship in Dance and Music for the Theatre is awarded annually to support visiting fellows in their work with Ward Collection and other materials at Houghton Library.
