= 1921 Nobel Prize in Literature =

- Anatole France
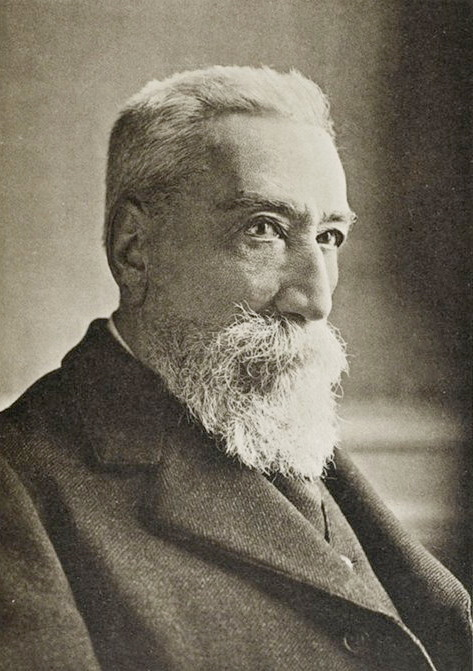
- "in recognition of his brilliant literary achievements, characterized as they are by a nobility of style, a profound human sympathy, grace, and a true Gallic temperament"
- Date: 10 November 1921 (announcement); 10 December 1921 (ceremony)
- Location: Stockholm, Sweden
- Presented by: Swedish Academy
- First award: 1901
- Website: Official website

The 1921 Nobel Prize in Literature was awarded to the French author Anatole France (1844–1924) "in recognition of his brilliant literary achievements, characterized as they are by a nobility of style, a profound human sympathy, grace, and a true Gallic temperament".

== Laureate ==
Anatole France (pseudonym for Jacques-Anatole-François Thibault) started writing poems in the classical tradition, but became known for his prose works. His stories and novels are noted for wit and irony, scepticism, social preoccupations and clarity in the classical tradition. Notable works include the four volume novel sequence collected under the title L'Histoire contemporaine ("A Chronicle of Our Own Times", 1897–1901). His famous oeuvres include Le Crime de Sylvestre Bonnard ("The Crime of Sylvestre Bonnard", 1881), La Rôtisserie de la reine Pédauque ("At the Sign of the Reine Pédauque", 1892), Les dieux ont soif ("The Gods Are Athirst", 1912) and La Révolte des anges ("The Revolt of the Angels", 1914).

== Nominations ==
Anatole France was nominatad 13 times since 1904 before he was awarded. He was first introduced for the Nobel Prize by French politician Marcellin Berthelot. In 1921, three nominations from Erik Staaff, Johan Vising and Emanuel Walberg was submitted for him to the Nobel committee. In total, the Nobel Committee received 18 nominees which included Arno Holz, Arne Garborg, Gunnar Gunnarsson, W. B. Yeats (awarded in 1923), George Bernard Shaw (awarded in 1925), Grazia Deledda (awarded in 1926), Henri Bergson (awarded in 1927) and John Galsworthy (awarded in 1932). Five of the nominees were newly nominated: Jacinto Benavente (awarded in 1922), Jean Revel, Émile Boutroux, Stefan Zeromski, and H. G. Wells. Deledda was the only female nominee during this year.

The authors Jean Aicard, Eduardo Acevedo Díaz, Hester A. Benedict, Maximilian Berlitz, Alexander Blok, Luca Caragiale, Georges Darien, Georges Feydeau, Otto von Gierke, Rosetta Luce Gilchrist, Nikolai Gumilev, John Habberton, Sarah Dyer Hobart, E. W. Hornung, Pavol Országh Hviezdoslav, Maria I. Johnston, Peter Kropotkin, Jeanne Lapauze, Lillian Rozell Messenger, Emilia Pardo Bazán, Abba Goold Woolson and Maria Amália Vaz de Carvalho died in 1921 without having been nominated.

Official list of nominees and their nominators for the prize
No.	Nominee	Country	Genre(s)	Nominator(s)
1	Ferdinand Avenarius (1856–1923)	Germany	poetry	Karl Groos (1861–1946); Rudolf Christoph Eucken (1846–1926)
2	Jacinto Benavente (1866–1954)	Spain	drama	21 members of Royal Spanish Academy
3	Henri Bergson (1859–1941)	France	philosophy	Verner von Heidenstam (1859–1940); members of the Académie des Sciences Morales et Politiques; members of the Académie Française
4	Émile Boutroux (1845–1921)	France	philosophy	Harald Hjärne (1848–1922)
5	Otokar Březina (1868–1929)	Czechoslovakia	poetry, essays	Arne Novák (1880–1939)
6	Grazia Deledda (1871–1936)	Kingdom of Italy	novel, short story, essays	17 members of the Accademia dei Lincei; Carl Bildt (1850–1931)
7	Anatole France (1844–1924)	France	poetry, essays, drama, novel, literary criticism	Emanuel Walberg (1873–1951); Johan Vising (1855–1942); Erik Staaff (1867–1936)
8	John Galsworthy (1867–1933)	Great Britain	novel, drama, essays, short story, memoir	Anders Österling (1884–1981)
9	Arne Garborg (1851–1921)	Norway	novel, poetry, drama, essays	Frits Läffler (1847–1921)
10	Ángel Guimerá Jorge (1845–1924)	Spain	drama, poetry	members of the Reial Acadèmia de Bones Lletres
11	Gunnar Gunnarsson (1889–1975)	Iceland	novel, short story, poetry	Adolf Noreen (1854–1925)
12	Arno Holz (1863–1929)	Germany	poetry, drama, essays	49 members of the Society of Authors
13	Alois Jirásek (1851–1930)	Czechoslovakia	novel, drama	Czech Academy of Sciences
14	Jean Revel (1848–1925)	France	history, short story	Académie des sciences, belles-lettres et arts de Rouen
15	George Bernard Shaw (1856–1950)	Ireland	drama, essays, novel	Henrik Schück (1855–1947)
16	Herbert George Wells (1866–1946)	Great Britain	novel, short story, essays, history, biography	Henrik Schück (1855–1947)
17	William Butler Yeats (1865–1939)	Ireland	poetry, drama, essays	Erik Axel Karlfeldt (1864–1931)
18	Stefan Żeromski (1864–1925)	Poland	novel, drama, short story	members of the Polish Academy of Arts and Sciences

== Prize decision ==
Anatole France had long been mentioned in the press as a popular choice for the Nobel prize. He had been discussed by the Nobel committee for the 1904 prize, but his candidacy was then dismissed by the committee, partly because of the "offensive eroticism" in his novels which according to committee member Carl David af Wirsén was not in line with Alfred Nobels guideline of an "ideal direction". Later Anatole France's left wing political views was also held against him by Wirsén.

Following the deliberations in 1921, four members of the Nobel committee recommended that the 1921 prize should be awarded to the English novelist John Galsworthy. But committee member Henrik Schück opposed the proposal, saying: "I believe I am not wrong in assuming that this proposal was put forward without enthusiasm. Galsworthy is a good second-rate writer, but hardly more."

Schück stated that among the English-language writers nominated he would place William Butler Yeats (subsequently awarded in 1923) much higher than Galsworthy. He also mentioned Grazia Deledda (awarded in 1926) and Jacinto Benavente (awarded in 1922) as worthy recipients of the prize, but said that "all three stand decidedly behind the undisputed great man of contemporary literature, Anatole France, whom I would therefore like to propose for this year's Nobel Prize." (...) "With regard to the Nobel Prize in Literature, two different opinions have been expressed. According to one, an entire career of an author should be rewarded, according to the other, a single, recently published masterpiece. If we now compare Anatole France and Galsworthy from the former point of view, there can be no doubt that Anatole France is the great author, Galsworthy the respectable mediocre. If we take the second point of view again, then perhaps someone could put In Chancery above Le petit Pierre. I can not."

On 10 November 1921, the Swedish Academy decided that that year's Nobel Prize in Literature should be awarded to Anatole France "in recognition of his brilliant literary achievements, characterized as they are by a nobility of style, a profound human sympathy, grace, and a true Gallic temperament". John Galsworthy was subsequently awarded the 1932 Nobel Prize in Literature.
