= 1922 Nobel Prize in Literature =

- Jacinto Benavente
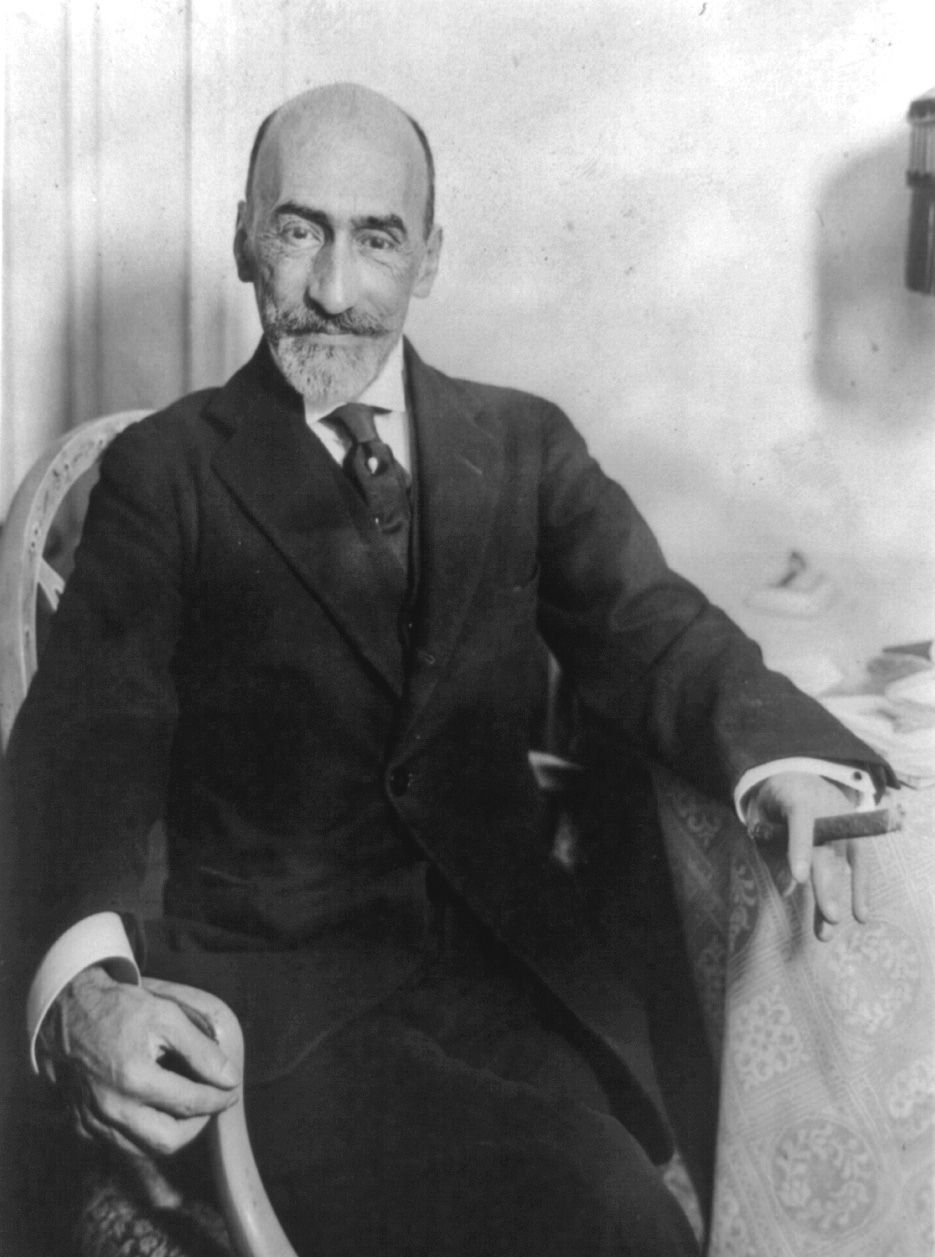
- "for the happy manner in which he has continued the illustrious traditions of the Spanish drama"
- Date: 9 November 1922 (announcement); 10 December 1922 (ceremony)
- Location: Stockholm, Sweden
- Presented by: Swedish Academy
- First award: 1901
- Website: Official website

The 1922 Nobel Prize in Literature was awarded to the Spanish dramatist Jacinto Benavente (1866–1954) "for the happy manner in which he has continued the illustrious traditions of the Spanish drama".

== Laureate ==
Jacinto Benavente y Martinez is considered to be one of the foremost Spanish dramatists of the 20th century. He stood out as a dramatist in his day by letting aesthetics and dramatic effects take a backseat to a realistic depiction of reality beyond the theater. The majority of his plays are comedies in the sense that they have a pleasant conclusion, and he worked hard to depict reality realistically. In his plays, which were set in Madrid or the made-up little town of Moraleda, primarily upper-class environments were portrayed alongside various social groupings, frequently in a lighthearted and satirical manner. His other famous plays include El nido ajeno (1894), Los intereses creados (1907), La malquerida (1913), Lecciones de buen amor (1924), etc.

== Nominations ==
Jacinto Benavente was first nominated in 1921 by 21 members of the Royal Spanish Academy, and again the following year by the Nobel committee. In total, the committee received 30 nominations for 22 authors which included Georg Brandes, Grazia Deledda (awarded in 1926), John Galsworthy (awarded in 1932).Thomas Hardy, Arno Holz, Wladyslaw Reymont (awarded in 1924), W. B. Yeats (awarded in 1923), and Stefan Zeromski. Ten of the nominees were newly nominated such as Roberto Bracco, Paul Ernst, Darrell Figgis, William Inge, Michael Sadleir, Matilde Serao, Sigrid Undset (awarded in 1928), Ludwig von Pastor, Israel Zangwill. There were three female writers nominated: two from Italy (Grazia Deledda and Matilde Serao) and one from Norway (Sigrid Undset).

The authors Lyman Abbott, Lima Barreto, Clementina Black, Wilfrid Scawen Blunt, Gerard Bolland, Elizabeth Williams Champney, Erskine Childers, Alfred Espinas, Nellie Blessing Eyster, Géza Gárdonyi, Constance Jones, Velimir Khlebnikov, Henry Lawson, Alice Meynell, Renzo Novatore, Mori Ōgai, Marcel Proust, Gabriel Séailles, George Robert Sims, Georges Sorel, Giovanni Verga died in 1922 without having been nominated for the prize.

Official list of nominees and their nominators for the prize
No.	Nominee	Country	Genre(s)	Nominator(s)
1	Jacinto Benavente (1866–1954)	Spain	drama	Nobel Committee
2	Roberto Bracco (1861–1943)	Italy	drama, screenplay	Kristoffer Nyrop (1858–1931); Haakon Shetelig (1877–1955)
3	Georg Brandes (1842–1927)	Denmark	literary criticism, essays	Aage Friis (1870–1949); Verner von Heidenstam (1859–1940); Selma Lagerlöf (1858–1940); Harry Fett (1875–1962)
4	Grazia Deledda (1871–1936)	Italy	novel, short story, essays	Carl Bildt (1850–1931)
5	Paul Ernst (1866–1933)	Germany	novel, short story, drama, essays	Paul Natorp (1854–1924)
6	Darrell Figgis (1882–1925)	Ireland	poetry, novel, essays	Thomas Rudmose-Brown (1878–1942)
7	John Galsworthy (1867–1933)	United Kingdom	novel, drama, essays, short story, memoir	Nobel Committee
8	Bertel Gripenberg (1878–1947)	Finland	poetry, drama, essays	Nathan Söderblom (1866–1931)
9	Ángel Guimerá Jorge (1845–1924)	Spain	drama, poetry	Reial Acadèmia de Bones Lletres de Barcelona
10	Gunnar Gunnarsson (1889–1975)	Iceland	novel, short story, poetry	Adolf Noreen (1854–1925)
11	Thomas Hardy (1840–1928)	United Kingdom	novel, short story, poetry, drama	Karl Sundén (1868–1945); Eilert Ekwall (1877–1964); Robert Eugen Zachrisson (1880–1937)
12	Arno Holz (1863–1929)	Germany	poetry, drama, essays	39 professors from Germany, Austria, Switzerland and Czechoslovakia
13	William Ralph Inge (1860–1954)	United Kingdom	theology, essays	Nathan Söderblom (1866–1931)
14	Władysław Reymont (1867–1925)	Poland	novel, short story	Nobel Committee
15	Michael Sadleir (1888–1957)	United Kingdom	novel, essays	Nobel Committee
16	Matilde Serao (1856–1927)	Italy	novel, essays	Roberto de Ruggiero (1875–1934); Francesco Torraca (1853–1938)
17	Sigrid Undset (1882–1949)	Norway	novel, memoir, essays	Frederik Poulsen (1876–1950)
18	Georg von Below (1858–1927)	Germany	history, essays	Hermann Bächtold (1882–1934)
19	Ludwig von Pastor (1854–1928)	Germany	history	Christian Hülsen (1858–1935); Olof Kolsrud (1885–1945)
20	William Butler Yeats (1865–1939)	Ireland	poetry, drama, essays	Nobel Committee
21	Israel Zangwill (1864–1926)	United Kingdom	novel, drama, translation	Adolf Noreen (1854–1925)
22	Stefan Żeromski (1864–1925)	Poland	novel, drama, short story	Nobel Committee

== Prize decision ==
The main contenders for the prize in 1922 were Benavente and the Irish poet William Butler Yeats. The Nobel committee considered them to be equally worthy of the prize, but noted that "we would not easily receive from southern Romance countries a proposal that is so likely to appeal to us upon thorough reflection, as is the case with this most prominent contemporary dramatic author of Spain. It is primarily with this in mind and the soon to be worrying gaps in the geographical distribution of the Nobel Prize that the committee, in the difficult choice between two poets as different and only comparable in literary value as Yeats and Benavente, has this year given preference to the latter." Yeats was awarded the prize the following year.

Other shortlisted candidates considered for the 1922 prize included Grazia Deledda (subsequently awarded the 1926 Nobel Prize in Literature), John Galsworthy (awarded in 1932), Thomas Hardy and Paul Ernst.

On 9 November 1922, the Swedish Academy decided that that year's Nobel Prize in Literature should be awarded to Jacinto Benavente "for the happy manner in which he has continued the illustrious traditions of the Spanish drama".
