= 1932 Nobel Prize in Literature =

- John Galsworthy
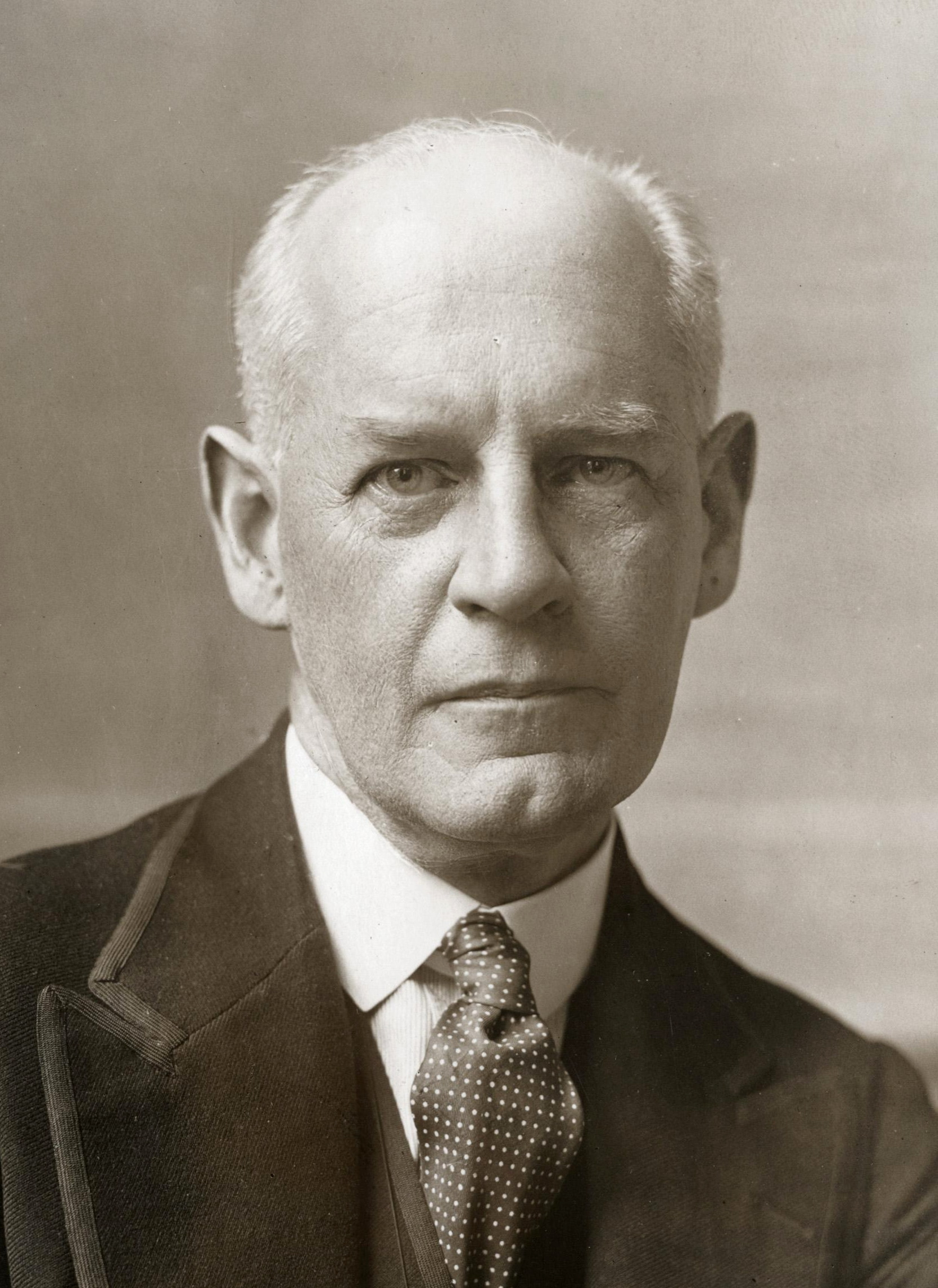
- "for his distinguished art of narration which takes its highest form in The Forsyte Saga."
- Date: 10 November 1932 (announcement); 10 December 1932 (ceremony)
- Location: Stockholm, Sweden
- Presented by: Swedish Academy
- First award: 1901
- Website: Official website

The 1932 Nobel Prize in Literature was awarded to the British author John Galsworthy (1867–1933) "for his distinguished art of narration which takes its highest form in The Forsyte Saga". Galsworthy was only the second English author to receive the Nobel Prize in Literature since its inception in 1901. (Note: The first English author to receive the prize was Rudyard Kipling, in 1907. Between the two awards, the prize had gone to three non-English authors who wrote in English: W. B. Yeats (1923), Bernard Shaw (1925), and Sinclair Lewis (1930); Rabindranath Tagore (1913) also sometimes wrote in English.)

== Laureate ==
John Galsworthy is best known for the novel sequence The Forsyte Saga which chronicles the lives of three generations of a large, upper-middle-class family at the turn of the 19th/20th century. Galsworthy was also a successful playwright who examined controversial ethical or social problems in plays such as Strife (1909), Justice (1910) and Loyalties (1922).

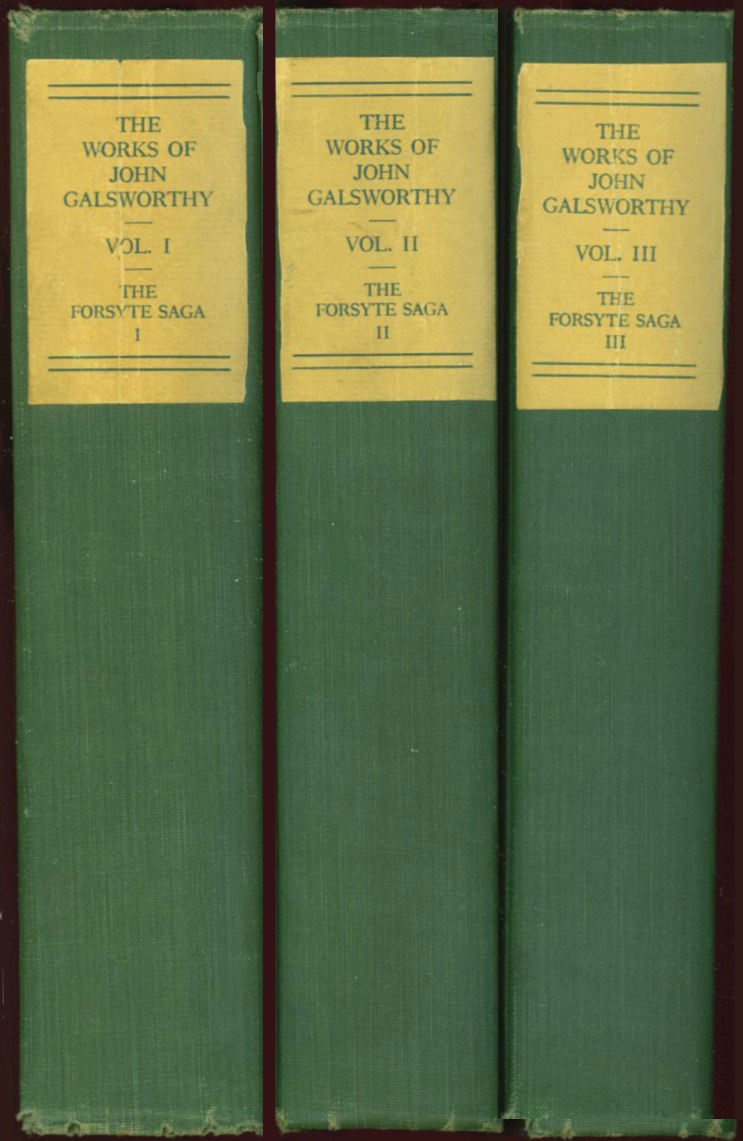
Galsworthy's The Forsyte Saga

=== The Forsyte Saga ===
The first book in this extensive series was published in 1906. The upper middle classes and Galsworthy's own upbringing were harshly criticized in The Man of Property. Galsworthy did not start working on it right away; he had to wait fifteen years, during which World War I broke out, before he started again with In Chancery (1920) and To Let (1921). He had penned a sizable quantity of plays, short stories, and novels in the interim. The three volumes of A Modern Comedy, The White Monkey (1924), The Silver Spoon (1926), Swan Song (1928), and its two interludes, A Silent Wooing and Passersby (1927), carried on the Forsyte Saga. These should be supplemented with a collection of short stories called On Forsyte Change (1930). Of Galsworthy's 20 novels, nine are about the Forsytes (the last three tangentially so) and the other eleven are all one-off stories.

== Nominations ==
John Galsworthy was nominated six times (1919–1922, 1931 and 1932) before he was awarded the prize in 1932. His first nomination came from Erik Axel Karlfeldt (1864–1931), the permanent secretary of the Swedish Academy. Others were from the persistent recommendation by other academy members such as Anders Österling, Martin Lamm, and Henrik Schück.

In total, the Nobel Committee received 48 nominations for 31 writers which included Ramón Menéndez Pidal, Ivan Bunin (awarded in 1933), Frans Eemil Sillanpää (awarded in 1939), Johannes V. Jensen (awarded in 1944), Paul Valéry, Kostis Palamas, Olav Duun, and H. G. Wells. Nine of the nominees were newly nominated namely Percival Elgood, Michael Blümelhuber, Grigol Robakidze, Axel Munthe, Francesco Orestano, Karel Čapek, Vilhelm Ekelund, Manuel Gálvez and Upton Sinclair. The Spanish author Concha Espina de la Serna was the only female nominee.

The authors Christopher Brennan, Mona Caird, Charles W. Chesnutt, Hart Crane, Evelyn Everett-Green, J. Meade Falkner, Kenneth Grahame, Ella Hepworth Dixon, Augusta Gregory, Jonas Mačiulis (known as Maironis), Gustav Meyrink, Harold Monro, Iacob Negruzzi, Giuseppe Peano, Sibylle Riqueti de Mirabeau (known as Gyp), Ahmed Shawqi, Frederick Jackson Turner, Edgar Wallace,Carmen de Burgos ,Henry S. Whitehead and Emma Wolf died in 1932 without having been nominated for the prize.

Official list of nominees and their nominators for the prize
No.	Nominee	Country	Genre(s)	Nominator(s)
1	Michael Blümelhuber (1865–1936)	Austria	essays, poetry	Oswald Redlich (1858–1944)
2	Johan Bojer (1872–1959)	Norway	novel, drama	Anders Sandvig (1862–1950)
3	Georg Bonne (1859–1945)	Germany	essays	Oswald Floeck (1874–1943); Günther Müller (1925–2020)
4	Olaf Bull (1883–1933)	Norway	poetry	Francis Bull (1887–1974); Jens Thiis (1870–1942)
5	Ivan Bunin (1870–1953)	Soviet Union	short story, novel, poetry	Ettore Lo Gatto (1890–1983); Michael Rostovtzeff (1870–1952); Vladimir Frant͡sev (1867–1942); Olaf Broch (1867–1961); Sigurd Agrell (1881–1937)
6	Karel Čapek (1890–1938)	Czechoslovakia	drama, novel, short story, essays, literary criticism	10 professors of the University in Prague
7	Hans Driesch (1867–1941)	Germany	philosophy	Ernest Bovet (1870–1941); Fritz Kern (1884–1950)
8	Olav Duun (1876–1939)	Norway	novel, short story	Helga Eng (1875–1966); Halvdan Koht (1873–1965)
9	Vilhelm Ekelund (1880–1949)	Sweden	poetry, essays	Alexander Seippel (1851–1938)
10	Percival Elgood (1863–1941)	United Kingdom; Egypt	history	Arthur James Grant (1862–1948)
11	Paul Ernst (1866–1933)	Germany	novel, short story, drama, essays	Fredrik Böök (1883–1961)
12	Concha Espina de la Serna (1869–1955)	Spain	novel, short story	Rudolf J. Slabý (1885–1957); John Driscoll Fitz-Gerald (1873–1946)
13	John Galsworthy (1867–1933)	United Kingdom	novel, drama, essays, short story, memoir	Henrik Schück (1855–1947)
14	Manuel Gálvez (1882–1962)	Argentina	novel, poetry, drama, essays, history, biography	Jeremiah D. M. Ford (1873–1958); 28 professors from the University of Buenos Aires
15	Bertel Gripenberg (1878–1947)	Finland; Sweden	poetry, drama, essays	Arno Cederberg (1885–1948) (Note: Frans Eemil Sillanpää and Bertel Gripenberg were nominated together by Arno R. Cederberg, though the nominations have different entry numbers.)
16	Johannes Vilhelm Jensen (1873–1950)	Denmark	novel, short story, poetry	Paul Rubow (1896–1972); Hans Brix (1870–1961); Johannes Brøndum-Nielsen (1881–1977)
17	Johannes Jørgensen (1866–1956)	Denmark	novel, poetry, biography	Viggo Brøndal (1887–1942)
18	Rudolf Kassner (1873–1959)	Austria	philosophy, essays, translation	Several professors (Note: Rudolf Kassner was nominated by a number of German, Austrian and Swiss professors, most of whom were eligible to nominate a candidate.)
19	Ramón Menéndez Pidal (1869–1968)	Spain	philology, history	Erik Staaff (1867–1936); 30 members of the Royal Spanish Academy
20	Dmitry Merezhkovsky (1865–1941)	Soviet Union	novel, essays, poetry, drama	Sigurd Agrell (1881–1937)
21	Axel Munthe (1857–1949)	Sweden; France	memoir, essays	Rolf Lagerborg (1874–1959)
22	Francesco Orestano (1873–1945)	Italy	philosophy, essays	Pietro Bonfante (1864–1932)
23	Kostis Palamas (1859–1943)	Greece	poetry, essays	Simos Menardos (1871–1933)
24	Grigol Robakidze (1880–1962)	Georgia	novel, short story, poetry, drama	Richard Meckelein (1880–1948)
25	Edwin Arlington Robinson (1869–1935)	United States	poetry, drama	Hjalmar Hammarskjöld (1862–1953)
26	Ivan Shmelyov (1873–1950)	Soviet Union; France	novel, short story	Nicolaas van Wijk (1880–1941)
27	Frans Eemil Sillanpää (1888–1964)	Finland	novel, short story, poetry	Torsten Evert Karsten (1870–1942); Eemil Nestor Setälä (1864–1935); Rafael Erich (1879–1946); Arno Cederberg (1885–1948)
28	Upton Sinclair (1878–1968)	United States	novel, short story, drama, autobiography, essays	800 nominators (Note: 800 nominations from all over the world were collected and sent together, by Ernest S. Greene (1864–1936), secretary of a committee in New York, United States. Among the nominators were members of the French and Spanish Academies, and professors (eligible to nominate) from several universities.)
29	Paul Valéry (1871–1945)	France	poetry, philosophy, essays, drama	5 members of the Académie Française; 23 professors (Note: Several were members of the French Academy (Académie Française), and Académie des Inscriptions et Belles-Lettres.)
30	Herbert George Wells (1866–1946)	United Kingdom	novel, short story, essays, history, biography	Sinclair Lewis (1885–1951)
31	Anton Wildgans (1881–1932)	Austria	poetry, drama	24 professors from the University of Vienna; Axel Romdahl (1880–1951)

== Prize decision ==
In their report to the Swedish Academy dated 17 September 1932, the Nobel committee proposed that the Nobel prize in Literature should be awarded to the English novelist John Galsworthy. The majority of the committee, Henrik Schück, Anders Österling and chairman Per Hallström, advocated a prize to Galsworthy, while member Hjalmar Hammarskjöld placed German writer Paul Ernst as his first proposal, Russian author Ivan Bunin (awarded in 1933) as his second proposal and Galsworthy as his third. Member Fredrik Böök added a separate opinion to the committee's report stating that he did not oppose Galsworthy being awarded, but preferred Paul Ernst.

On 10 November 1932 the Swedish academy decided that the Nobel Prize in Literature should be awarded to John Galsworthy "for his distinguished art of narration which takes its highest form in The Forsyte Saga."

== Reactions ==
The choice of John Galsworthy caused a group of young Swedish authors to protest against the Swedish Academy's conservatism by sending a telegram to the Russian author Maxim Gorky, expressing their regret that he had not been awarded the prize.

Galsworthy himself did not think he deserved the award. "As the least worthy of the Nobel prizemen honoured today I shall have but few words to say", he wrote in his acceptance speech.

== Award ceremony ==
At the award ceremony in Stockholm on 10 December 1932, Anders Österling of the Swedish Academy praised the Forsyte Saga as "a masterpiece of an energetic, firm, and independent account of human nature", noting that the two trilogies "together form an unusual literary accomplishment. The novelist has carried the history of his time through three generations, and his success in mastering so excellently his enormously difficult material, both in its scope and in its depth, remains an extremely memorable feat in English literature"

Due to poor health, John Galsworthy was not able to travel to Stockholm for the award ceremony. He died only a few weeks later.
