= 1925 Nobel Prize in Literature =

- George Bernard Shaw
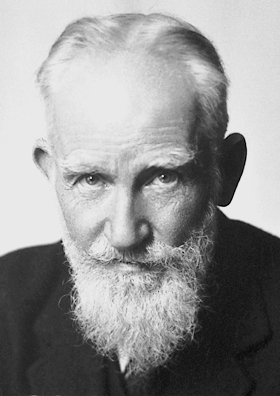
- "for his work which is marked by both idealism and humanity, its stimulating satire often being infused with a singular poetic beauty."
- Date: 12 November 1925 (Note: The Swedish Academy decided on 12th November 1925 that this year's Nobel Prize in Literature would be reserved for the following year.) (postponement); 11 November 1926 (announcement); 10 December 1926 (ceremony)
- Location: Stockholm, Sweden
- Presented by: Swedish Academy
- First award: 1901
- Website: Official website

The 1925 Nobel Prize in Literature was awarded to the Irish playwright George Bernard Shaw (1856–1950) "for his work which is marked by both idealism and humanity, its stimulating satire often being infused with a singular poetic beauty." The prize was awarded in 1926. Shaw was the second Irish Nobel laureate in literature after W. B. Yeats won in 1923.

== Laureate ==
George Bernard Shaw, the son of a government servant, was born in Dublin. At the age of 20, he relocated to London after working as a real estate agent. Five of his novels had been turned down before he rose to prominence as a literary and music critic. He was a member of the Fabian Society, a socialist thinktank that had Virginia Woolf among its members. He simultaneously promoted racial biology and made flattering remarks about Mussolini, Stalin, and Hitler.

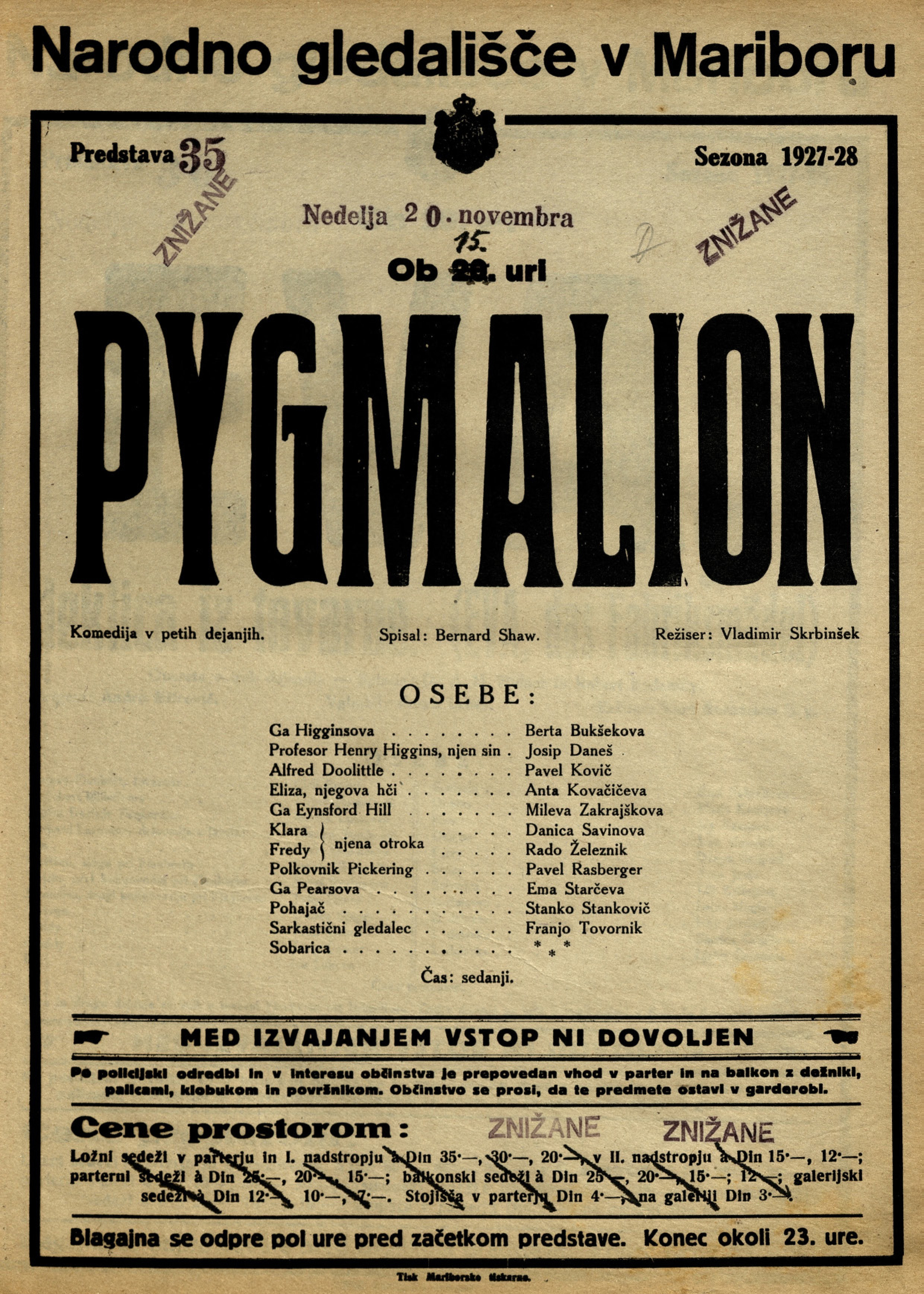
Theater poster for Pygmalion in Slovenia performed on 20 December 1927.

As a theater critic and commentator, Shaw wrote essays to support his critiques of modern British theater. He claimed that art should be educational and address societal issues in his first plays, Plays: Pleasant and Unpleasant (1898). Allegories, provocation, and satire are hallmarks of Shaw's plays. The most well-known of his more than 60 plays is Pygmalion (1912). Shaw advanced the theory of "creative evolution," a form of racial biology that denied each person's inherent value. Among his major plays include Caesar and Cleopatra (1898), Man and Superman (1902), Major Barbara (1905), Saint Joan (1923).

== Deliberations ==
=== Nominations ===
George Bernard Shaw was nominated seven times before he, in 1926, was awarded the 1925 prize. He was first recommended to the Nobel Committee in 1911 by British scholar Gilbert Murray and in 1912 by Norwegian academic Kristian Birch-Reichenwald Aars. His nominations came back in 1921 to 1926, when he was nominated annually by three different nominators, Henrik Schück, Tor Hedberg and Nathan Söderblom, all of which are members of the Swedish Academy.

In total, the Swedish Academy received 25 letters nominating 21 writers from Europe including Thomas Hardy, Georg Brandes, Guglielmo Ferrero (with 5 nominations – the highest), Willem Kloos, Paul Sabatier, Paul Claudel, Kostis Palamas, Roberto Bracco, Johan Bojer, Olav Duun and Paul Ernst. Six of the authors were newly nominated, namely Johannes Vilhelm Jensen (awarded in 1944), Giovanni Schembari, Paul Elmer More, Paul Raynal, Ferenc Herczeg and Rudolf Maria Holzapfel. There were only three female authors nominated, namely Grazia Deledda (awarded in 1926), Matilde Serao and Sigrid Undset (awarded in 1928).

The authors Hugo Bettauer, George Washington Cable, Mary Cholmondeley, Gottlob Frege, Mikhail Gershenzon, René Ghil, Pyotr Gnedich, Gerhard Gran, H. Rider Haggard, Emma Curtis Hopkins, José Ingenieros, Gustav Kastropp, Amy Lowell, Felix Liebermann, Pierre Louÿs, Antun Branko Šimić, Rudolf Steiner, Elisabeth von Heyking, Friedrich von Hügel and Sergei Yesenin died in 1925 without having been nominated for the prize.

Official list of nominees and their nominators for the prize
| No. | Nominee | Country | Genre(s) | Nominator(s) |
|---|---|---|---|---|
| 1 | Johan Bojer (1872–1959) | Norway | novel, drama | Christen Collin (1857–1926) |
| 2 | Roberto Bracco (1861–1943) | Italy | drama, screenplay | Haakon Shetelig (1877–1955) |
| 3 | Georg Brandes (1842–1927) | Denmark | literary criticism, essays | Harry Fett (1875–1962) |
| 4 | Otokar Březina (1868–1929) | Czechoslovakia | poetry, essays | 6 professors of the University in Brno |
| 5 | Grazia Deledda (1871–1936) | Italy | novel, short story, essays | Henrik Schück (1855–1947) |
| 6 | Olav Duun (1876–1939) | Norway | novel, short story | Hjalmar Lindroth (1893–1979) |
| 7 | Paul Ernst (1866–1933) | Germany | novel, short story, drama, essays | Emil Ermatinger (1873–1953) |
| 8 | Guglielmo Ferrero (1871–1942) | Italy | history, essays, novel | Gaetano Salvemini (1873–1957); Gaetano Mosca (1858–1941); Niccolò Rodolico (1873–1969); Professors in Geneva; Professors in Neuchâtel; Nathan Söderblom (1866–1931); Verner von Heidenstam (1859–1940) |
| 9 | Thomas Hardy (1840–1928) | United Kingdom | novel, short story, poetry, drama | Robert Eugen Zachrisson (1880–1937) |
| 10 | Ferenc Herczeg (1863–1954) | Hungary | novel, drama, essays | Hungarian Academy of Sciences |
| 11 | Rudolf Maria Holzapfel (1874–1930) | Austria | philosophy, essays | Romain Rolland (1866–1944) |
| 12 | Johannes Vilhelm Jensen (1873–1950) | Denmark | novel, short story, poetry | Frederik Poulsen (1876–1950) |
| 13 | Willem Kloos (1859–1938) | Netherlands | poetry, essays, literary criticism | Dutch authors and professors (Note: W. Kloos was nominated by a number of Dutch authors and professors; at least one was confirmed as being eligible to make a nomination.) |
| 14 | Paul Elmer More (1864–1937) | United States | theology, essays, literary criticism | Nathan Söderblom (1866–1931) |
| 15 | Paul Raynal (1885–1971) | France | drama, essays | Tor Hedberg (1862–1931) |
| 16 | Paul Sabatier (1858–1928) | France | history, theology, biography | Carl Bildt (1850–1931) |
| 17 | Giovanni Schembari (1894–1959) | Italy | essays | Achille Loria (1857–1943) |
| 18 | Matilde Serao (1856–1927) | Italy | novel, essays | 4 professors of the Academy in Naples |
| 19 | George Bernard Shaw (1856–1950) | Ireland | drama, essays, novel | Tor Hedberg (1862–1931) |
| 20 | Sigrid Undset (1882–1949) | Norway | novel, memoir, essays | 2 members of the Royal Norwegian Society of Sciences and Letters (Note: The two nominators highlights Undset's Kristin Lavransdatter (The Bridal Wreath, 1923; The Mistress of Husaby, 1925; The Cross, 1927) in the nomination.) |
| 21 | Ludwig von Pastor (1854–1928) | Germany | history | Olof Kolsrud (1885–1945) |

=== Prize decision ===
In their report to the Swedish Academy dated 12 September 1925, the Nobel committee recommended that the prize for 1925 should not be awarded. Among the nominees dismissed were four authors who were subsequently awarded the prize, George Bernard Shaw, Grazia Deledda, Sigrid Undset and Johannes V. Jensen. One committee member, Erik Axel Karlfeldt, unsuccessfully proposed that the year's prize should be awarded to the English poet and novelist Thomas Hardy. The Nobel committee also considered the Czech poet Otokar Březina, but his candidacy was hindered as none of the committee members could read his work in the original language but were referred to rather inadequate German and English translations.

In November 1925, the Swedish Academy declared that no Nobel Prize in Literature would be awarded with the following statement:

"During the selection process in 1925, the Nobel Committee for Literature decided that none of the year's nominations met the criteria as outlined in the will of Alfred Nobel. According to the Nobel Foundation's statutes, the Nobel Prize can in such a case be reserved until the following year, and this statute was then applied."

After the deliberations in 1926, the Swedish Academy decided that George Bernard Shaw should be awarded the prize for 1925.

== Reactions ==
At first, Shaw declined the prize stating "I can forgive Nobel for inventing dynamite, but only a fiend in human form could have invented the Nobel prize". He later changed his mind and accepted the honour, but refused to receive the prize money.

Shaw recommended that the prize money instead used to fund the translation of works by Swedish playwright August Strindberg to English.

== Award ceremony ==
At the award ceremony in Stockholm on 10 December 1926, Per Hallström, chairman of the Nobel committee of the Swedish Academy, said:

[George Bernard Shaw's] somewhat abstract logical radicalism (...) combined with a ready wit, a complete absence of respect for any kind of convention, and the merriest humour – all gathered together in an extravagance which has scarcely ever before appeared in literature. (...)

Early he became a prophet of revolutionary doctrines, quite varied in their value, in the spheres of aesthetics and sociology, and he soon won for himself a notable position as a debater, a popular speaker, and a journalist. He set his mark on the English theatre as a champion of Ibsen and as an opponent of superficial tradition, both English and Parisian. (...)

[Shaw] came to create what is to some extent a new kind of dramatic art, which must be judged according to its own special principles. Its novelty does not lie so much in structure and form; from his wide-awake and trained knowledge of the theatre, he promptly and quite simply obtains any scenic effect he feels necessary for his ends. But the directness with which he puts his ideas into practice is entirely his own.
