= List of Irish Nobel laureates and nominees =

Since 1923, Ireland (which consists of the Republic of Ireland and Northern Ireland, the latter a constituent part of the United Kingdom) has produced eleven Nobel laureates: one in Physics, one in Physiology or Medicine, four in Literature and five in Peace category.

Two additional Nobel laureates in physics are sometimes included in this list: Guglielmo Marconi, whose mother was Irish, and Erwin Schrödinger, who became a naturalised Irish citizen in 1948 (he received the award in 1933).

== Laureates ==
Year	Image	Laureate	Born	Died	Field	Rationale
Citizens
1923		William Butler Yeats	13 June 1865 in Sandymount, Dublin	28 January 1939 in Roquebrune-Cap-Martin, Alpes-Maritimes, France	Literature	"for his always inspired poetry, which in a highly artistic form gives expression to the spirit of a whole nation."
1925		George Bernard Shaw	26 July 1856 in Dublin	2 November 1950 in Ayot St Lawrence, Hertfordshire, England	Literature	"for his work which is marked by both idealism and humanity, its stimulating satire often being infused with a singular poetic beauty."
1933		Erwin Schrödinger	12 August 1887 in Vienna, Austria (acquired Irish citizenship in 1948)	4 January 1961 in Vienna, Austria	Physics	"for the discovery of new productive forms of atomic theory" (shared with English physicist Paul Dirac)
1951		Ernest Walton	6 October 1903 in Dungarvan, County Waterford	25 June 1995 in Belfast	Physics	"for their pioneer work on the transmutation of atomic nuclei by artificially accelerated atomic particles." (shared with English physicist John Cockcroft)
1969		Samuel Beckett	13 April 1906 in Foxrock, Dublin	22 December 1989 in Paris, France	Literature	"for his writing, which - in new forms for the novel and drama - in the destitution of modern man acquires its elevation."
1974		Seán MacBride	26 January 1904 in Paris, France	15 January 1988 in Dublin	Peace	"for his efforts to secure and develop human rights throughout the world." (shared with Japanese politician Eisaku Satō)
1976		Betty Williams	22 May 1943 in Belfast	17 March 2020 in Belfast	Peace	"for the courageous efforts in founding a movement to put an end to the violent conflict in Northern Ireland."
1976		Mairead Maguire	27 January 1944 in Belfast	—N/a	Peace	"for the courageous efforts in founding a movement to put an end to the violent conflict in Northern Ireland."
1995		Seamus Heaney	13 April 1939 in Tamniaran, near Castledawson	30 August 2013 in Blackrock, Dublin	Literature	"for works of lyrical beauty and ethical depth, which exalt everyday miracles and the living past."
1998		John Hume	18 January 1937 in Derry	3 August 2020 in Derry	Peace	"for their efforts to find a peaceful solution to the conflict in Northern Ireland."
1998		David Trimble	15 October 1944 in Belfast	25 July 2022 in Belfast	Peace	"for their efforts to find a peaceful solution to the conflict in Northern Ireland."
2015		William Cecil Campbell (Note: Campbell acquired United States citizenship in 1964.)	28 June 1930 in Ramelton, County Donegal	—N/a	Physiology or Medicine	"for their discoveries concerning a novel therapy against infections caused by roundworm parasites." (shared with Japanese biochemist Satoshi Ōmura and Chinese malariologist Tu Youyou)

== Nominations ==
=== Nominees ===
Image	Nominee	Born	Died	Years Nominated	Citation	Nominator(s)
Physics
	John Sealy Townsend	7 June 1868 in Galway, County Galway, Ireland	16 February 1957 in Oxford, England	1924, 1942	"for studies concerning the electrical conduction of gases (concerning the kinetics of electrons and ions) and directly measured the electrical charge. "	Jean Baptiste Perrin (1870–1942); France
	John Sealy Townsend	7 June 1868 in Galway, County Galway, Ireland	16 February 1957 in Oxford, England	1944	"for his discovery of a phenomenon of the electron avalanche in electromagnetism (Townsend discharge)."	Victor Albert Bailey (1895–1964); Australia
Literature
	William Butler Yeats	13 June 1865 in Sandymount, Leinster, Ireland	28 January 1939 in Roquebrune-Cap-Martin, Alpes-Maritimes, France	1902	The Land of Heart's Desire (1894); Cathleen ni Houlihan (1902); The King's Threshold (1904); Deirdre (1907); The Green Helmet (1910); The Wild Swans at Coole (1919); The Tower (1928); Last Poems and Plays (1940)	William E. H. Lecky (1838–1903); Ireland
	William Butler Yeats	13 June 1865 in Sandymount, Leinster, Ireland	28 January 1939 in Roquebrune-Cap-Martin, Alpes-Maritimes, France	1914	The Land of Heart's Desire (1894); Cathleen ni Houlihan (1902); The King's Threshold (1904); Deirdre (1907); The Green Helmet (1910); The Wild Swans at Coole (1919); The Tower (1928); Last Poems and Plays (1940)	George Noble Plunkett (1851–1948); Ireland
	William Butler Yeats	13 June 1865 in Sandymount, Leinster, Ireland	28 January 1939 in Roquebrune-Cap-Martin, Alpes-Maritimes, France	1915, 1918	The Land of Heart's Desire (1894); Cathleen ni Houlihan (1902); The King's Threshold (1904); Deirdre (1907); The Green Helmet (1910); The Wild Swans at Coole (1919); The Tower (1928); Last Poems and Plays (1940)	Per Hallström (1866–1960); Sweden
	William Butler Yeats	13 June 1865 in Sandymount, Leinster, Ireland	28 January 1939 in Roquebrune-Cap-Martin, Alpes-Maritimes, France	1921	The Land of Heart's Desire (1894); Cathleen ni Houlihan (1902); The King's Threshold (1904); Deirdre (1907); The Green Helmet (1910); The Wild Swans at Coole (1919); The Tower (1928); Last Poems and Plays (1940)	Erik Axel Karlfeldt (1864–1931); Sweden
	William Butler Yeats	13 June 1865 in Sandymount, Leinster, Ireland	28 January 1939 in Roquebrune-Cap-Martin, Alpes-Maritimes, France	1922, 1923	The Land of Heart's Desire (1894); Cathleen ni Houlihan (1902); The King's Threshold (1904); Deirdre (1907); The Green Helmet (1910); The Wild Swans at Coole (1919); The Tower (1928); Last Poems and Plays (1940)	Nobel Committee
	George Bernard Shaw	26 July 1856 in Dublin, Ireland	2 November 1950 in Ayot St Lawrence, Hertfordshire, England	1911	Candida (1898); Caesar and Cleopatra (1901); Man and Superman (1902); Major Barbara (1907); The Doctor's Dilemma (1909); Pygmalion (1913); Saint Joan (1923)	Gilbert Murray (1866–1957); Great Britain
	George Bernard Shaw	26 July 1856 in Dublin, Ireland	2 November 1950 in Ayot St Lawrence, Hertfordshire, England	1912	Candida (1898); Caesar and Cleopatra (1901); Man and Superman (1902); Major Barbara (1907); The Doctor's Dilemma (1909); Pygmalion (1913); Saint Joan (1923)	Kristian Birch-Reichenwald Aars (1868–1917); Norway
	George Bernard Shaw	26 July 1856 in Dublin, Ireland	2 November 1950 in Ayot St Lawrence, Hertfordshire, England	1921	Candida (1898); Caesar and Cleopatra (1901); Man and Superman (1902); Major Barbara (1907); The Doctor's Dilemma (1909); Pygmalion (1913); Saint Joan (1923)	Henrik Schück (1855–1947); Sweden
	George Bernard Shaw	26 July 1856 in Dublin, Ireland	2 November 1950 in Ayot St Lawrence, Hertfordshire, England	1924, 1925, 1926	Candida (1898); Caesar and Cleopatra (1901); Man and Superman (1902); Major Barbara (1907); The Doctor's Dilemma (1909); Pygmalion (1913); Saint Joan (1923)	Tor Hedberg (1862–1931); Sweden
	George Bernard Shaw	26 July 1856 in Dublin, Ireland	2 November 1950 in Ayot St Lawrence, Hertfordshire, England	1926	Candida (1898); Caesar and Cleopatra (1901); Man and Superman (1902); Major Barbara (1907); The Doctor's Dilemma (1909); Pygmalion (1913); Saint Joan (1923)	Nathan Söderblom (1866–1931); Sweden
	Edward Dowden (Note: Dowden died before the only chance to be rewarded.)	3 May 1843 in Cork, County Cork, Ireland	4 April 1913 in Dublin, Ireland	1913	Shakspere: A Critical Study of His Mind and Art (1875); Shakespeare Primer (1877); The Life of Percy Bysshe Shelley (1886)	James Lindsay (1847–1913); Great Britain
	Darrell Figgis	17 September 1882 in Dublin, Ireland	27 October 1925 in London, England	1922	Recollections of the Irish War (1900); A Vision of Life (1909); A Chronicle of Jails (1917); The Return of the Hero (1923)	Thomas Rudmose-Brown (1878–1942); Ireland
	James Cousins	22 July 1873 in Belfast, County Antrim	20 February 1956 in Madanapalle, Andhra Pradesh, India	1935 (Note: The Nobel Prize in Literature has not been awarded this year.)	The Sleep of the King (1902); New Ways in English Literature (1912); The Renaissance in India (1918); A Bardic Pilgrimage (1934)	Rabindranath Tagore (1861–1941); India
	Seán O'Casey	30 March 1880; Dublin, Ireland	18 September 1964; Torquay, Devon, England	1949, 1950	The Shadow of a Gunman (1923); Juno and the Paycock (1924); The Plough and the Stars (1926); The Silver Tassie (1927); The End of the Beginning (1937); Red Roses for Me (1942); Cock-a-Doodle Dandy (1949)	Oscar Wieselgren (1886–1971); Sweden
	Seán O'Casey	30 March 1880; Dublin, Ireland	18 September 1964; Torquay, Devon, England	1950	The Shadow of a Gunman (1923); Juno and the Paycock (1924); The Plough and the Stars (1926); The Silver Tassie (1927); The End of the Beginning (1937); Red Roses for Me (1942); Cock-a-Doodle Dandy (1949)	Mary Elizabeth Morton (1876–1957); Ireland
	Seán O'Casey	30 March 1880; Dublin, Ireland	18 September 1964; Torquay, Devon, England	1955	The Shadow of a Gunman (1923); Juno and the Paycock (1924); The Plough and the Stars (1926); The Silver Tassie (1927); The End of the Beginning (1937); Red Roses for Me (1942); Cock-a-Doodle Dandy (1949)	Una Ellis-Fermor (1894–1958); Great Britain
	Seán O'Casey	30 March 1880; Dublin, Ireland	18 September 1964; Torquay, Devon, England	1957	The Shadow of a Gunman (1923); Juno and the Paycock (1924); The Plough and the Stars (1926); The Silver Tassie (1927); The End of the Beginning (1937); Red Roses for Me (1942); Cock-a-Doodle Dandy (1949)	Oscar Cargill (1898–1972); United States
	Seán O'Casey	30 March 1880; Dublin, Ireland	18 September 1964; Torquay, Devon, England	1959, 1961, 1962	The Shadow of a Gunman (1923); Juno and the Paycock (1924); The Plough and the Stars (1926); The Silver Tassie (1927); The End of the Beginning (1937); Red Roses for Me (1942); Cock-a-Doodle Dandy (1949)	Geoffrey Tillotson (1905–1969); Great Britain
	Seán O'Casey	30 March 1880; Dublin, Ireland	18 September 1964; Torquay, Devon, England	1961	The Shadow of a Gunman (1923); Juno and the Paycock (1924); The Plough and the Stars (1926); The Silver Tassie (1927); The End of the Beginning (1937); Red Roses for Me (1942); Cock-a-Doodle Dandy (1949)	Roy Pascal (1904–1980); Great Britain
	Seán O'Casey	30 March 1880; Dublin, Ireland	18 September 1964; Torquay, Devon, England	1963	The Shadow of a Gunman (1923); Juno and the Paycock (1924); The Plough and the Stars (1926); The Silver Tassie (1927); The End of the Beginning (1937); Red Roses for Me (1942); Cock-a-Doodle Dandy (1949)	The English PEN Club
	Edward Plunkett, 18th Baron of Dunsany	July 24, 1878 in London, England	25 October 1957 in Dublin, Ireland	1950	The Gods of Pegāna (1905); The King of Elfland's Daughter (1924); The Travel Tales of Mr. Joseph Jorkens (1931)	The Irish PEN Club
	Lennox Robinson	4 October 1886 in Douglas, County Cork, Ireland	15 October 1958 in Dublin, Ireland	1957	The Clancy Name (1908); The Whiteheaded Boy (1916); The Big House (1926); Drama at Inish (1933)	The Irish PEN Club
	Samuel Beckett	13 April 1906 in Foxrock, Dublin Ireland	22 December 1989 in Paris, France	1957	Murphy (1938); Molloy (1951); Malone Dies (1951); Waiting for Godot (1952); The Unnamable (1953); Krapp's Last Tape (1958); How It Is (1961); Happy Days (1961)	Robert-Léon Wagner (1905–1982); France
	Samuel Beckett	13 April 1906 in Foxrock, Dublin Ireland	22 December 1989 in Paris, France	1963, 1966	Murphy (1938); Molloy (1951); Malone Dies (1951); Waiting for Godot (1952); The Unnamable (1953); Krapp's Last Tape (1958); How It Is (1961); Happy Days (1961)	Johannes Edfelt (1904–1997); Sweden
	Samuel Beckett	13 April 1906 in Foxrock, Dublin Ireland	22 December 1989 in Paris, France	1964, 1965, 1966, 1967, 1968	Murphy (1938); Molloy (1951); Malone Dies (1951); Waiting for Godot (1952); The Unnamable (1953); Krapp's Last Tape (1958); How It Is (1961); Happy Days (1961)	William Stuart Maguinness (1903–1983); Great Britain
	Samuel Beckett	13 April 1906 in Foxrock, Dublin Ireland	22 December 1989 in Paris, France	1964	Murphy (1938); Molloy (1951); Malone Dies (1951); Waiting for Godot (1952); The Unnamable (1953); Krapp's Last Tape (1958); How It Is (1961); Happy Days (1961)	Bengt Holmqvist (1924–2002); Finland
	Samuel Beckett	13 April 1906 in Foxrock, Dublin Ireland	22 December 1989 in Paris, France	1966	Murphy (1938); Molloy (1951); Malone Dies (1951); Waiting for Godot (1952); The Unnamable (1953); Krapp's Last Tape (1958); How It Is (1961); Happy Days (1961)	Léon Cellier et al. (Note: With another 1966 nominator namely William York Tindall (1903–1981)of the United States.) (1911–1976); France
	Samuel Beckett	13 April 1906 in Foxrock, Dublin Ireland	22 December 1989 in Paris, France	1967, 1968	Murphy (1938); Molloy (1951); Malone Dies (1951); Waiting for Godot (1952); The Unnamable (1953); Krapp's Last Tape (1958); How It Is (1961); Happy Days (1961)	Nelly Sachs (1891–1970); Sweden
	Samuel Beckett	13 April 1906 in Foxrock, Dublin Ireland	22 December 1989 in Paris, France	1967	Murphy (1938); Molloy (1951); Malone Dies (1951); Waiting for Godot (1952); The Unnamable (1953); Krapp's Last Tape (1958); How It Is (1961); Happy Days (1961)	The Swedish PEN Club et al. (Note: Other 1967 nominators included Per-Olof Barck (1912–1978) of Finland and Barbara Hardy (1924–2016) of Great Britain.)
	Samuel Beckett	13 April 1906 in Foxrock, Dublin Ireland	22 December 1989 in Paris, France	1967, 1968	Murphy (1938); Molloy (1951); Malone Dies (1951); Waiting for Godot (1952); The Unnamable (1953); Krapp's Last Tape (1958); How It Is (1961); Happy Days (1961)	Siegbert Salomon Prawer (1925–2012); Great Britain
	Samuel Beckett	13 April 1906 in Foxrock, Dublin Ireland	22 December 1989 in Paris, France	1968	Murphy (1938); Molloy (1951); Malone Dies (1951); Waiting for Godot (1952); The Unnamable (1953); Krapp's Last Tape (1958); How It Is (1961); Happy Days (1961)	Matthew Hodgart et al. (Note: Other 1968 nominators included Robert Brustein (1927–2023) of the United States and Gerhard Heilfurth (1909–2006) of Germany.) (1916–1996); Great Britain
	Samuel Beckett	13 April 1906 in Foxrock, Dublin Ireland	22 December 1989 in Paris, France	1969	Murphy (1938); Molloy (1951); Malone Dies (1951); Waiting for Godot (1952); The Unnamable (1953); Krapp's Last Tape (1958); How It Is (1961); Happy Days (1961)	Christopher Ricks et al. (Note: Other 1969 nominators included Jan Kott (1914–2001) of Poland, Wolfgang Clemen (1909–1990) of Germany, Martin Price (1920–2010) of the United States and Helmut Kreuzer (1927–2004) of Germany.) (born 1933); Great Britain
	Elizabeth Bowen	7 June 1899 in Dublin, Ireland	22 February 1973 in London, England	1958	The Last September (1929); The House in Paris (1936); The Heat of the Day (1949); Eva Trout (1968)	Roman Jakobson (1896–1982); Russia
	Austin Clarke	9 May 1896 in Stoneybatter, Dublin, Ireland	19 March 1974 in Templeogue, Dublin, Ireland	1972	Night and Morning (1938); Ancient Lights (1955); Twice Round the Black Church (1962); A Penny in the Clouds (1968)	Kenneth Deale (1907–1974); Ireland
	Austin Clarke	9 May 1896 in Stoneybatter, Dublin, Ireland	19 March 1974 in Templeogue, Dublin, Ireland	1972	Night and Morning (1938); Ancient Lights (1955); Twice Round the Black Church (1962); A Penny in the Clouds (1968)	Desmond Clarke (1907–1979); Ireland
	Stanislaus Lynch	1907 in Ballyjamesduff, County Cavan, Ireland	1983 in County Cavan, Ireland	1972	Echoes of the Hunting Horn (1947); A Hunting Man's Rambles (1951); Hounds are Running! (1950)	Desmond Clarke (1907–1979); Ireland
	Francis Stuart	29 April 1902 in Townsville, Queensland, Australia	2 February 2000 in Fanore, County Clare, Ireland	1972	The Pillar of Cloud (1948); Redemption (1949); The Flowering Cross (1950); Black List, Section H (1971)	Desmond Clarke (1907–1979); Ireland
Peace
	Arthur Griffith (Note: Griffiths was jointly nominated with David Lloyd George but died before the only chance to be rewarded.)	31 March 1871 in Dublin, Ireland	12 August 1922 in Dublin, Ireland	1922	"for [his role in the] peaceful negotiations with the Anglo-Irish Treaty in establishing Irish Free State."	Halvdan Koht (1873–1965); Norway
	Fr. William Ferris	1881 in Rattoo, County Kerry, Ireland	1971 in Ballylongford, County Kerry, Ireland	1938	"for his brochure The Democratic Constitution, in which he outlined an electoral system which guaranteed unanimity in choice of every spokesman or representative, securing perfect harmony in the counsels of all assemblies, local, national, and international."	Jed O'Sullivan (Note: The nomination was made by two members of the Irish national assembly, but the other name was illegible.) (?); Ireland
	Raphael Armattoe (Note: Armattoe was a resident of Northern Ireland at the time he was nominated for the Nobel Peace Prize.)	12 August 1913 in Keta, Volta, Ghana	22 December 1953 in Hamburg, Germany	1948	"for his campaigns for the unification of British Togoland, the Gold Coast and French Togoland."	members of the Parliament of Ireland (Note: The nomination was also signed by MPs from Belfast, Northern Ireland. The nomination was also supported by Anthony Mulvey, R. Cinningham and Fred Peart, Baron Peart.)
	The Shop Stewards of the Belfast Shipyards	Belfast, Northern Ireland		1970	"for their devoted efforts to prevent sectarian violence breaking out in the shipyards and contributing to inter-communal peace."	members of the Parliament of Ireland
	Bloody Sunday families	Bogside, Derry, Northern Ireland		2023	"for their commitment to peace and reconciliation during their long fight for truth and justice."	Colum Eastwood (born 1983); Ireland
