= 1923 Nobel Prize in Literature =

- William Butler Yeats
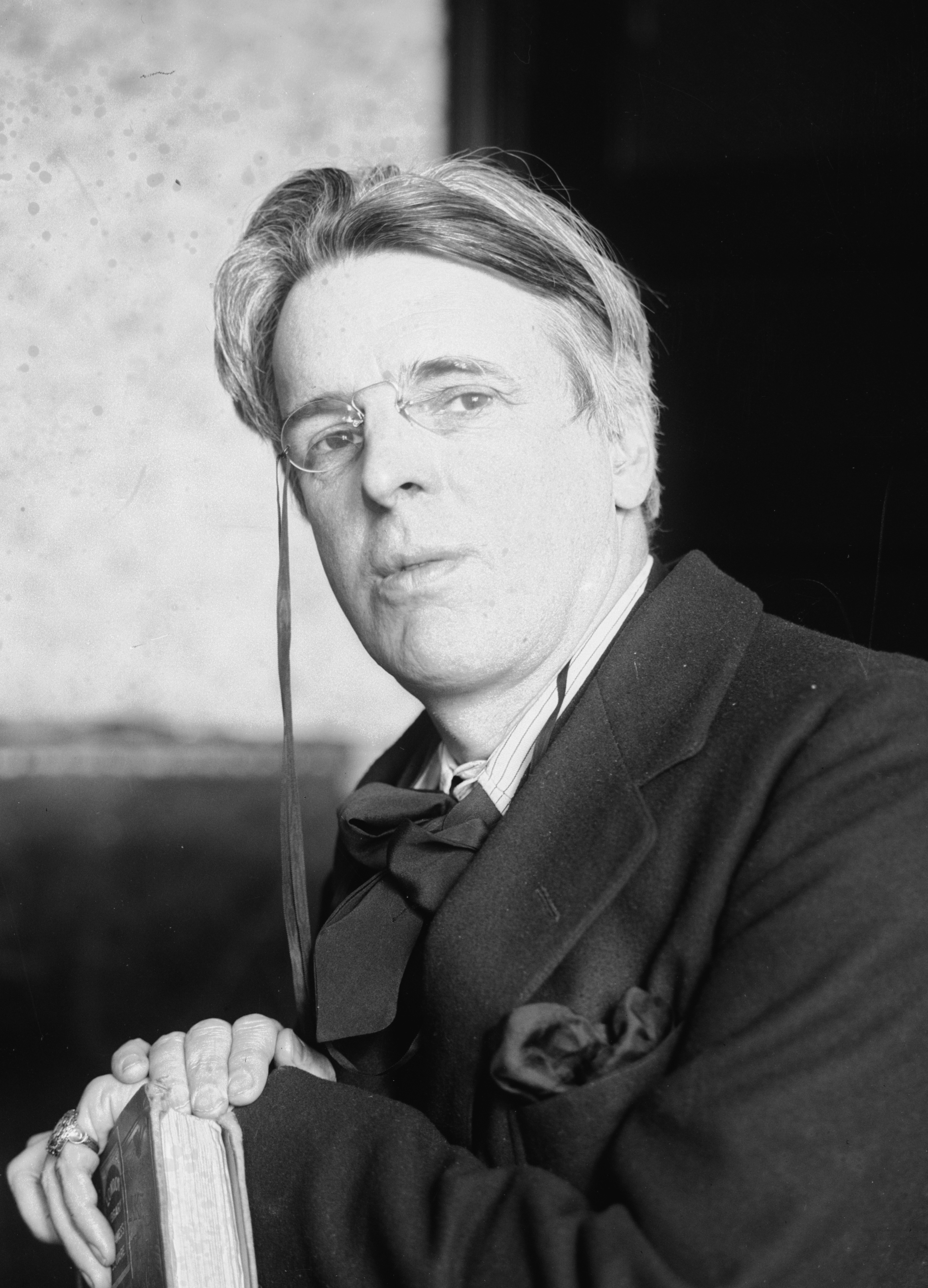
- "for his always inspired poetry, which in a highly artistic form gives expression to the spirit of a whole nation"
- Date: 14 November 1923 (announcement); 10 December 1923 (ceremony)
- Location: Stockholm, Sweden
- Presented by: Swedish Academy
- First award: 1901
- Website: Official website

The 1923 Nobel Prize in Literature was awarded to the Irish poet and dramatist William Butler Yeats (1865–1939) "for his always inspired poetry, which in a highly artistic form gives expression to the spirit of a whole nation". He was the first Irish Nobel laureate in literature.

== Laureate ==
William Butler Yeats is regarded as one of the greatest poets of the 20th century. Most of his work has Irish subjects. Yeats was also a successful author of numerous plays and wrote prose works. Recurrent themes in his writing are the contrast of art and life, masks, cyclical theories of life (the symbol of the winding stairs), and the ideal of beauty and ceremony contrasting with the modern life. Yeats is noted for being one of the few Nobel laureates who wrote some of his greatest work after he was awarded the prize, such as The Tower (1928), The Winding Stair and Other Poems (1933), and Last Poems and Plays (1940).

== Nominations ==
William Butler Yeats was nominated for the prize seven times before he was awarded in 1923. In 1923, he was nominated and recommended by all the members of the Nobel Committee in Literature. In total, the Committee received 36 nominations for 20 writers which included Thomas Hardy, Paul Ernst, Maxim Gorky, Arno Holz, Roberto Bracco, Ludwig von Pastor and Àngel Guimerà. Five of the authors were new recommendations for the prize namely Ivan Bunin (awarded in 1933), Konstantin Balmont, Einar Hjörleifsson Kvaran, Hermann Türck and Guglielmo Ferrero, who earned seven nominations – the highest number of nominations – from academics and literature professors. Three of the nominees were women namely Elisabeth Förster-Nietzsche, Grazia Deledda (awarded in 1926) and Dora Melegari.

The authors Maurice Barrès, William Boyle, Henry Bradley, Oscar Browning, John Cadvan Davies, Louis Couperus, Demetru Demetrescu-Buzău (known as Urmuz), Ulderiko Donadini, Marcellus Emants, Jaroslav Hašek, Emerson Hough, Guerra Junqueiro, Virginie Loveling, Katherine Mansfield, Fritz Mauthner, Florence Montgomery, Hume Nisbet, Vilfredo Pareto, Raymond Radiguet, Morris Rosenfeld, Edith Södergran, Ernst Troeltsch, Hovhannes Tumanyan and Kate Douglas Wiggin died in 1923 without having been nominated for the prize.

Official list of nominees and their nominators for the prize
| No. | Nominee | Country | Genre(s) | Nominator(s) |
|---|---|---|---|---|
| 1 | Konstantin Balmont (1867–1942) | Soviet Union | poetry, translation | Romain Rolland (1866–1944) |
| 2 | Roberto Bracco (1861–1943) | Italy | drama, screenplay | Haakon Shetelig (1877–1955) |
| 3 | Ivan Bunin (1870–1953) | Soviet Union | short story, novel, poetry | Romain Rolland (1866–1944) |
| 4 | Grazia Deledda (1871–1936) | Italy | novel, short story, essays | Carl Bildt (1850–1931) |
| 5 | Paul Ernst (1866–1933) | Germany | novel, short story, drama, essays | Albert Soergel (1880–1958); Hans Vaihinger (1852–1933); Eduard Schwartz (1858–1940); Georg Dehio (1850–1932); August Frickenhaus (1882–1925); Ulrich von Wilamowitz-Moellendorff (1848–1931); Peter Behrens (1868–1940); Henrik Pontoppidan (1857–1943); Robert Faesi (1883–1972); Emil Ermatinger (1873–1953) |
| 6 | Guglielmo Ferrero (1871–1942) | Italy | history, essays, novel | Nathan Söderblom (1866–1931); Academy of Rio de Janeiro; Henri Pirenne (1862–1935); Paul Bourget (1852–1935); Gabriel Hanotaux (1853–1944); Anatole France (1844–1924); Four Swiss professors in history; Edward Potts Cheyney (1861–1947); Gaetano Mosca (1858–1941); Antonio de Viti de Marco (1858–1943); Gaetano Salvemini (1873–1957); Niccolò Rodolico (1873–1969) |
| 7 | Elisabeth Förster-Nietzsche (1846–1935) | Germany | essays, autobiography | Hans Vaihinger (1852–1933); Kurt Breysig (1866–1940); Ernst Bertram (1884–1957); Georg Goetz (1849–1932) |
| 8 | Maxim Gorky (1868–1936) | Soviet Union | novel, short story, drama, memoir, autobiography, essays, poetry | Romain Rolland (1866–1944) |
| 9 | Bertel Gripenberg (1878–1947) | Finland | poetry, drama, essays | Fredrik Wulff (1845–1930); Nathan Söderblom (1866–1931) |
| 10 | Ángel Guimerá Jorge (1845–1924) | Spain | drama, poetry | Fredrik Wulff (1845–1930) |
| 11 | Thomas Hardy (1840–1928) | United Kingdom | novel, short story, poetry, drama | Uno Lindelöf (1868–1944); Romain Rolland (1866–1944); Robert Eugen Zachrisson (1880–1937) |
| 12 | Arno Holz (1863–1929) | Germany | poetry, drama, essays | Eugen Wolf (1850–1912) |
| 13 | William Ralph Inge (1860–1954) | United Kingdom | theology, essays | Nathan Söderblom (1866–1931) |
| 14 | Einar Hjörleifsson Kvaran (1859–1938) | Iceland | novel, poetry, drama, essays | Valtýr Guðmundsson (1860–1928) |
| 15 | Dora Melegari (1849–1924) | Switzerland; Italy | novel, short story, essays, literary criticism | Luigi Luzzatti (1841–1927) |
| 16 | Matilde Serao (1856–1927) | Italy | novel, essays | Giuseppe De Lorenzo (1871–1957); Francesco Torraca (1853–1938) |
| 17 | Hermann Türck (1856–1933) | Germany | essays, biography | Rudolf Unger (1876–1942); Wolfgang Golther (1863–1945) |
| 18 | Ludwig von Pastor (1854–1928) | Germany | history | Olof Kolsrud (1885–1945) |
| 19 | William Butler Yeats (1865–1939) | Ireland | poetry, drama, essays | Nobel Committee |
| 20 | Stefan Żeromski (1864–1925) | Poland | novel, drama, short story | Kazimierz Morawski (1852–1925); Stanisław Wróblewski (1868–1938) |

== Prize decision ==
William Butler Yeats was first nominated for the prize in 1902, when he was at the age of 37, but his candidacy was then dismissed by the Nobel committee who found his work "often obscure" and too limited in scope. Yeats was nominated again in 1914, 1915 and 1918 by members of the Nobel committee, but while the committee noted Yeats growing reputation, they decided to await further works. In 1921 Yeats was nominated again by committee member Erik Axel Karlfeldt who noted that Yeats "had won much acknowledgement for his remarkable lyrical writing", but the committee was still hesitant to award him the prize, with one member saying that Yeats "rather often lacks the clarity" that he thought a worthy recipient of the Nobel prize should have. The following year however, Yeats was the main contender for the prize along with the Spanish playwright Jacinto Benavente, who was chosen as the recipient of the prize in 1922. In 1923 Yeats was again a leading candidate, this time competing with the English poet and novelist Thomas Hardy. Two members of the committee advocated a prize to Hardy, but the others supported Yeats who was awarded the prize.

== Reactions ==
The Nobel prize to William Butler Yeats was well received. One writer in The Guardian said that "Mr. Yeats is to be congratulated, almost without reserve, on lifting this substantial stake. He is a poet of real greatness; prose, too, he can write like an angel", however arguing that Thomas Hardy would have been a worthier recipient of the award.
