= Uno Lindelöf =

Finnish linguist and politician (1868–1944)

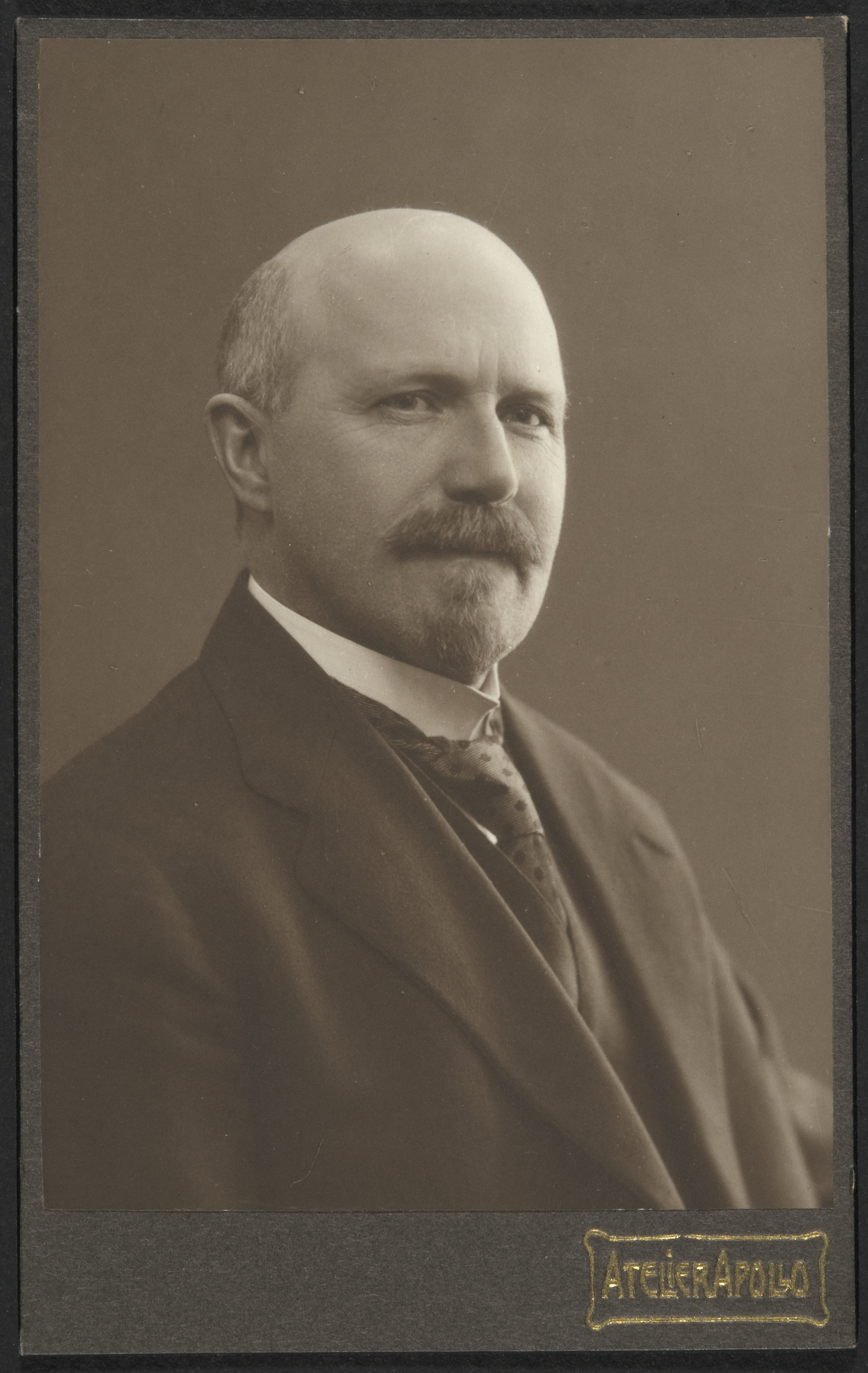
Uno Lindelöf in 1917

Uno Lorenz Lindelöf (30 March 1868 – 7 February 1944) was a Finnish linguist and politician, born in Helsinki. He was a member of the Diet of Finland in 1897, 1899, 1900, from 1904 to 1905 and from 1905 to 1906 and of the Parliament of Finland from 1909 to 1913, representing the Swedish People's Party of Finland.
