= Paul Raynal =

French author

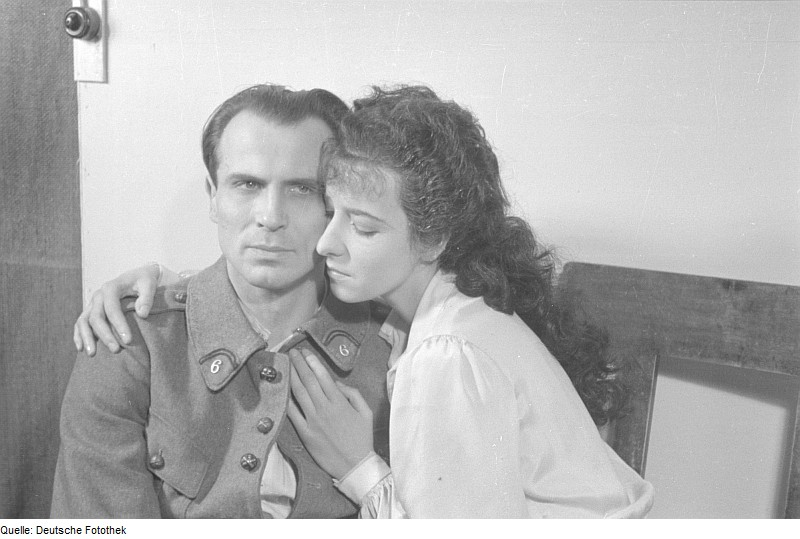
Fotothek df pk 0000045 015 Szenenbilder.jpg

Paul Raynal (25 July 1885 in Narbonne, Aude, France; † 18 August 1971 in Paris, France) was a French playwright, actor and director who had considerable success in the 1920s and 1930s.

== Life ==
Raynal was born in Narbonne, the son of a wine merchant, and was educated by Dominicans. He went to Paris to study medicine, but then changed to study law before deciding to become a playwright. For four years, he fought in the First World War, both in Champagne and in the Army of the Orient (i.e., on the Salonika front, where he contracted malaria).

Raynal's first play, the comedy Le maitre de son coeur (written in 1909 in his parents' house in Narbonne, though only performed in 1920), was an instant success. In the same year Raynal bought a house in Champagne, at Maison-Neuve near Bar-sur-Aube. In 1927, he would move to Saint-Léger-en-Bray in the Oise, where he wrote most of his successful inter-war plays. In 1940, during the Second World War, German troops ransacked a house he was renting in the Oise, destroying or removing a number of his manuscripts and papers, as well as books from his library.

Raynal is buried in the Cimetière de Cité in Narbonne.

== Le Tombeau sous l’Arc de Triomphe ==
Despite the success of Le maitre de son coeur, according to the US playwright, poet and lecturer Jane Dransfield (1875–1957), it was his second play, Le Tombeau sous l’Arc de Triomphe, that "raised its author ... into the front ranks of the dramatists of young France".

This 1924 anti-war play Le Tombeau sous l’Arc de Triomphe (translated into English in 1928 as The Unknown Warrior by Cecil Lewis) was the most performed war play of the inter-war years. Concerning a soldier returning home on leave during the September 1915 Champagne Offensive, the play was premiered on 30 January 1924 at the Paris National Theatre Comédie-Française. It was later translated into several languages and revived at the Théâtre de l'Odéon in 1929.

The play appears to have caused a furore on its first night, because some in the audience felt that it disrespected the French poilu. This view subsided once audiences understood the play, though Henry de Montherlant was scathing about it. In Britain it was however only moderately successful (though George Bernard Shaw said that "it was almost worth having war to have so fine a play"), and it failed on Broadway.

Le Tombeau sous l’Arc de Triomphe was the first of a trilogy of plays about the First World War, the others being La Francerie (1933, about the Battle of the Marne) and Le Matériel humain (published in 1946, though written in 1935, and set on the Salonika front). The lack of success of Le Matériel humain when it was performed after the Second World War may well have led Raynal to retire from writing plays, though the German sacking of his house and a serious car accident, also in 1940, may also have played a part.

== List of plays ==
- 1920: Le maitre de son coeur, a comedy in three acts, produced at the Théâtre de l'Odéon on 25 June 1920.
- 1924: Le Tombeau sous l'Arc de Triomphe, a tragedy in three acts.
- 1932: Au soleil de l'Instinct, a tragedy in three acts, performed at the Théâtre de l'Œuvre.
- 1933: La Francerie, a play in three acts, performed at the Comédie-Française.
- 1936: Napoléon unique, an epic comedy in three acts.
- 1939: A souffert sous Ponce Pilate, a play in three acts, performed at Comédie-Française on 26 April 1939.
- 1948: Le Matériel humain, a play in three acts and an epilogue.
