= Torsten Evert Karsten =

Finnish philologist (1870–1942)

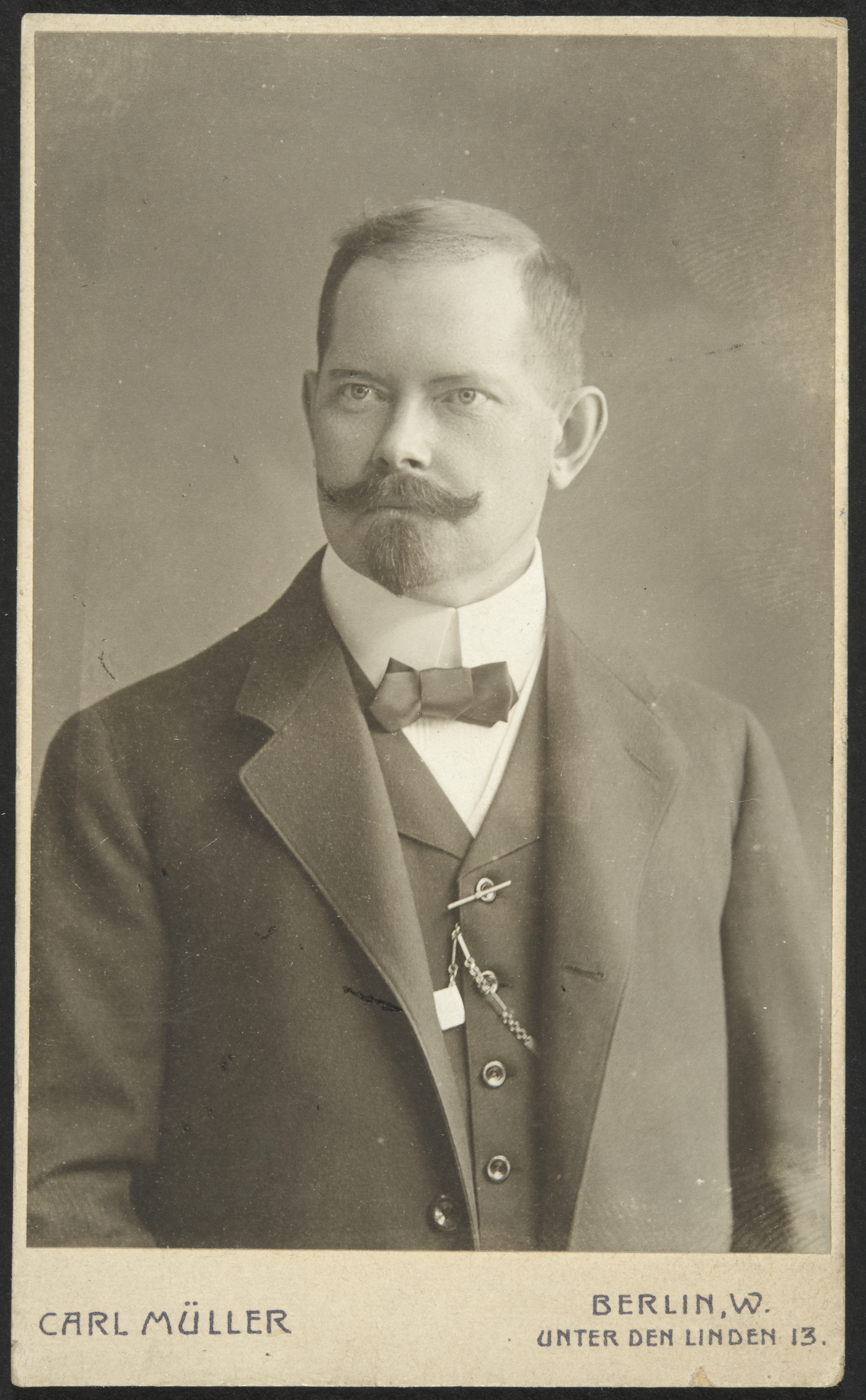
- Born: 20 August 1870; Orivesi, Grand Duchy of Finland
- Died: 12 September 1942 (aged 72); Helsinki, Finland

Academic background
- Education: University of Helsinki

Academic work
- Discipline: Germanic philology
- Sub-discipline: Nordic philology
- Institutions: University of Helsinki

Torsten (Tor) Evert Karsten (20 August 1870 – 12 September 1942) was a Finnish philologist who specialized in Germanic studies.

== Biography ==
Torsten Evert Karsten was born in Orivesi, Grand Duchy of Finland, the son of Pastor Klas Edvin Karsten and Maria Augusta Emilia Cajanus. His family were Finland Swedes. He was the brother of philosopher Rafael Karsten.

Karsten received his Ph.D. at the University of Helsinki in 1897, and subsequently served as a lecturer there. He married Elsa Maria Malin in 1909. At Helsinki, Karsten served as Professor of Germanic Philology from 1912 to 1931, and as Professor of Nordic Philology since 1931. He was the author of a number of works on Germanic studies. Karsten died in Helsinki on 12 September 1942.

== Selected works ==
- Studier öfver de nordiska språkens primära nominalbildning 1, väitöskirja. Lidstedts antikv. bokh., distr., Helsingfors 1895
- Beiträge zur Geschichte der ē-Verba im Altgermanischen. Mémoires de la Société néo-philologique à Helsingfors II. Helsingfors 1897
- Fornnordisk folkpoesi. Särtryck ur Svenska reallyceets i Helsingfors Berättelse 1899–1900. Helsingfors 1900
- Studier öfver de nordiska språkens primära nominalbildning 1-2. Bidrag till kännedom av Finlands natur och folk, Häft 59. Finska Vetenskapssocieteten, Helsingfors 1900
- Beiträge zur germanischen Wortkunde. Mémoires de la Société néo-philologique à Helsingfors 3. Société néophilologique, Helsingfors 1902.
- Studier öfver de nordiska språkens primära nominalbildning: Ordregister. Bidrag till kännedom av Finlands natur och folk, Häft 62. Finska Vetenskapssocieteten, Helsingfors 1903
- Eine germanische Wortsippe im Finnischen. Journal de la Société finno-ougrienne 23, 20. Finskugriska sällskapet, Helsingfors 1906.
- Österbottniska ortnamn: Språkhistorisk och etnografisk undersökning 1. Helsingfors 1906
- Österbottniska ortnamn: Språkhistorisk och etnografisk undersökning 1: Fortsättning. Helsingfors 1908
- Die mitteldeutsche poetische Paraphrase des Buches Hiob aus der Handschrift der Königlichen Staatsarchivs zu Königsberg herausgegeben. Weidmannsche Buchhandlung, Berlin 1910
- Belysning av dr R. Saxéns "Randanmärkningar" till min uppsats "Äldre germansk kultur i Finland belyst av ortnamnen". Skrifter utgivna av Svenska litteratursällskapet i Finland 95. Svenska litteratursällskapet i Finland, Helsingfors 1911
- Äldre germansk kultur i Finland belyst av ortnamnen. Skrifter utgivna av Svenska litteratursällskapet i Finland 95. Svenska litteratursällskapet i Finland, Helsingfors 1911
- Harjavalta och Raitio "fjärdingar" i Satakunta samt det svenska ordet härad. Skrifter utgivna av Svenska litteratursällskapet i Finland 113. Svenska litteratursällskapet i Finland, Helsingfors 1914
- Lexikografiska bidrag till kännedomen av österbottniska landsmål: tillägg till H. Vendells "Ordbok över de östsvenska dialekterna". Skrifter utgivna av Svenska litteratursällskapet i Finland 113. Svenska litteratursällskapet i Finland, Helsingfors 1914
- Några tillägg och rättelser till SNF. 5, 2 och 3. Skrifter utgivna av Svenska litteratursällskapet i Finland 113. Svenska litteratursällskapet i Finland, Helsingfors 1914
- Svenskarnas bosättningar i Finland. Studentfylkingens småskrifter 6–7. Helsingfors 1914
- Germanisch-finnische Lehnwortstudien: Ein Beitrag zu der ältesten Sprach- und Kulturgeschichte der Germanen. Acta Societatis scientiarum Fennicae 45, 2. Finska Vetenskapssocieteten, Helsingfors 1915
- Ett par språkhistoriska anmärkningar. Skrifter utgivna av Svenska litteratursällskapet i Finland 139. Svenska litteratursällskapet i Finland, Helsingfors 1918
- Varifrån har Finlands svensk-talande befolkning kommit? Den fjärde nordgermanska nationaliteten: Föredrag hållet av professor T. E. Karsten vid föreningen "Brages" årsfest 28. II. 1920. Helsingfors 1920
- Svensk bygd i Österbotten nu och fordom: en namnundersökning 1: Naturnamn. Skrifter utgivna av Svenska litteratursällskapet i Finland 155. Svenska litteratursällskapet i Finland, Helsingfors 1921
- Zum Anfangsterminus der germanisch-finnischen Berührungen: ergänzungen. Commentationes humanarum litterarum Tom. 1–2. Finska vetenskaps-societeten, Helsingfors 1922
- Svensk bygd i Österbotten nu och fordom: en namnundersökning 2: Kulturnamn. Skrifter utgivna av Svenska litteratursällskapet i Finland 171. Svenska litteratursällskapet i Finland, Helsingfors 1923
- Zur Erklärung der germanischen Lautverschiebung. Mémoires de la Société néophilologique de Helsinki 7. Société néophilologique, Helsingfors 1924
- Germanerna: en inledning till studiet av deras språk och kultur. Natur och kultur 42. Söderström, Helsingfors 1925
- Die Germanen: eine Einführung in die Geschichte ihrer Sprache und Kultur. Walter de Gruyter & Co, Leipzig 1928
- Sprachforschung und Siedlungsgeschichte. Mémoires de la Société néophilologique de Helsinki 8. Société néo-philologique, Helsingfors 1929
- De första germanerna. Lundequistska bokhandeln, Uppsala 1930
- Die neuen Runen- und Bilderfunde aus der Unter-Weser (Oldenburg). Commentationes humanarum litterarum 3–4. Finska vetenskapssocieteten, Helsingfors 1930
- Zu den neugefundenen Runeinschriften aus der Unterweser. Von Magnus Hammarström und T. E. Karsten. Commentationes humanarum litterarum 97. Finska vetenskapssocieteten, Helsingfors 1930
- Germanische Minderheitenprobleme von nordischem Gesichtspunkt aus betrachet: Sprachlich-kulturgeschichtliche Skizzen. Commentationes humanarum litterarum 4: 3. Finska vetenskapssocieteten, Helsingfors 1932
- Ist gemeinnord: Torg "Markt" ein slavisches Lehnwort? Annales Academiae scientiarum Fennicae. Series B 27, 11. Suomalainen tiedeakatemia, Helsinki 1932
- Populärt vetenskapliga uppsatser: Våra ortnamn; Runskriftens vägar i Norden; Blandspråk och lånord. Föreningen för nordisk filologi i Helsingfors 1935
- En blick på finländska dop- och släktnamn: föredrag. Helsingfors 1939
- När nådde finnarna Östersjön och när trädde de i beröring med germaner? Den östersjöfinska linna-borgens ursprung: föredrag. Societas scientiarum fennica. Årsbok 18 B nro 2. Helsingfors 1940
- Die alten nordischen und germanischen Völkerbeziehungen Finnlands im Lichte der neueren Forschung: eine Übersicht der Hauptergebnisse. Bidrag till kännedom av Finlands natur och folk 88. Finska vetenskaps-societeten, Helsingfors 1941
- Finnar och germaner: tre årtusendens folkförbindelser. Folkmålsstudier 9. Föreningen för nordisk filologi i Helsingfors 1941
- Über die Archäologie als Hilfsquelle für germanisch-finnische Lehnwortforschung. Bidrag till kännedom av Finlands natur och folk 88, 3. Finska vetenskaps-societeten, Helsingfors 1942
- Våra äldre tyska kulturförbildelser. Svenska tysklandsvänners i Finland skriftserie 1. Svenska tysklandsvänner i Finland, Åbo 1942
- Beröringar mellan svenskt och finskt folkspräk. 1933–1937

== Sources ==
- Kohvakka, Hannele: ”Karsten, Tor Evert (1870–1942)”, Suomen kansallisbiografia, osa 5, s. 16–17. Helsinki: Suomalaisen Kirjallisuuden Seura, 2005. ISBN 951-746-446-0. Teoksen verkkoversio.
