= Ulderiko Donadini =

Croatian novelist, dramatist and short story writer

- Born: April 8, 1894; Plaški, Kingdom of Croatia-Slavonia, Transleithania, Austria-Hungary
- Died: May 10, 1923 (aged 29); Zagreb, Zagreb Oblast, Kingdom of Serbs, Croats and Slovenes
- Occupations: Writer, dramatist, novelist
- Writing career
- Period: 1915–1922
- Genres: Novel, drama, song, novella, essay

Ulderiko Donadini (April 8, 1894 – May 10, 1923) was a Croatian novelist, dramatist and short story writer.

== Life ==
He was born in Plaški, a village in Karlovac County, Croatia, into a family originating from Austrian Italy, as the Donadinis had moved to Korčula from Vicenza or Mantua sometime around 1750. As a result of his father's heavy drinking, the family went bankrupt and his parents divorced, leaving Ulderiko and his siblings (six sisters and one brother) in dire straits. Ulderiko later studied biology and chemistry in Zagreb, but left the university without graduating. As a student, he participated in riots and demonstrations directed against Slavko Cuvaj, the viceroy of Croatia-Slavonia. After a couple of months in the military hospital, where he faked mental distraction to avoid service, Donadini was finally proclaimed ineligible for the army, enabling him to lead an extravagant life style over the following years. Among his good friends were fellow poets Antun Branko Šimić and August Cesarec, but he was also influenced by the works of Antun Gustav Matoš, Vladimir Čerina and Miroslav Krleža. Up until 1921, when he was diagnosed with schizophrenia, he worked as a school teacher in Petrinja, Zagreb and Vinkovci. He died in 1923 in a mental hospital in Zagreb, one day after cutting his throat with a razor.

== Writing ==
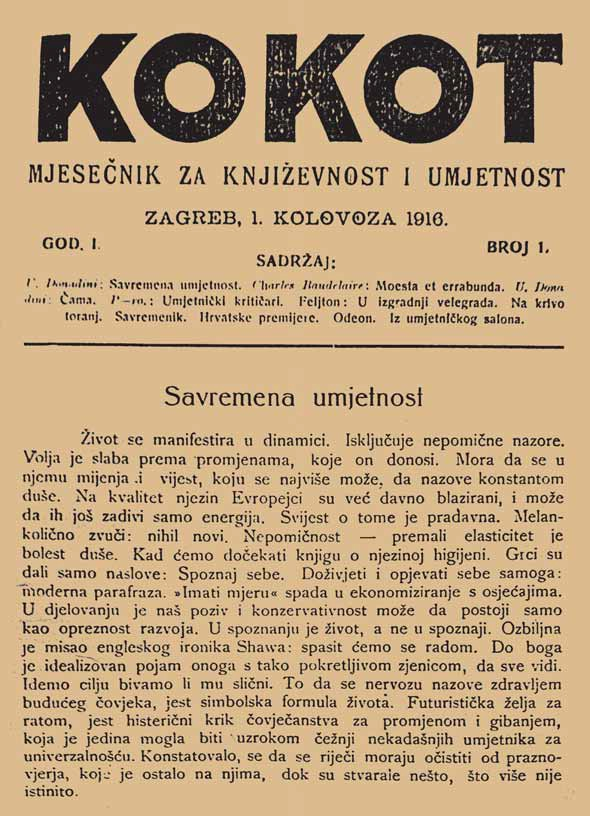
The first issue of Kokot, released on August 1, 1916, featured Donadini's essay titled Savremena umjetnost (Modern Art), now considered the first Croatian expressionist manifesto.

Donadini is best remembered as the editor of the short-lived literary journal Kokot (1916–1918), in which he introduced expressionist and Avant-garde ideas into Croatian literature. His writing is to be found in other important journals of the period as well, such as Savremenik, Vijavica, Obzor, Kritika etc. By his own account, Donadini's work was influenced by E. T. A. Hoffmann, Barbey d'Aurevilly, Poe, and Baudelaire. Due to his constant criticism of stable and preferred social institutions that enable the functioning of civil society, Donadini is also considered to be the successor to Janko Polić Kamov. Some of his most famous short stories are "Đavo gospodina Andrije Petrovića", "Dunja" and "Doktor Kvak".

Donadini wrote four plays, three of which were published, and two of which have been performed. His first play, Bezdan (1919), adapted from his 1917 novel Vijavice, was enthusiastically received by the audiences, but was condemned by the critics, and even led to accusations of "immorality". Gogoljeva smrt (1921) was his best and most performed play.

== Works ==
- Lude priče (short stories, 1915)
- Sablasti (novel, 1917)
- Vijavice (novel, 1917)
- Kamena s ramena (essays and feuilletons, 1917)
- Bezdan (drama, 1919)
- Gogoljeva smrt (drama, 1920)
- Igračka oluje (drama, 1921)
- Kroz šibe (novel, 1921)
- Bauk (novel, 1922)

== Bibliography ==
- Maštrović, Tihomil (1982). "Ulderiko Donadini kao dramatičar" (PDF). Dani Hvarskoga kazališta (in Croatian). 9 (1): 120–126.
- Ređep, Draško (1971). Milisavac, Živan (ed.). Jugoslovenski književni leksikon [Yugoslav Literary Lexicon] (in Serbo-Croatian). Novi Sad (SAP Vojvodina, SR Serbia): Matica srpska.
- Rogić Musa, Tea (2011). "Utopijska slika svijeta u manifestima Ulderika Donadinija" (PDF). Nova Croatica (in Croatian). 5 [35] (5 [55]): 183–201.
