= Alfred Espinas =

French academic (1844–1922)

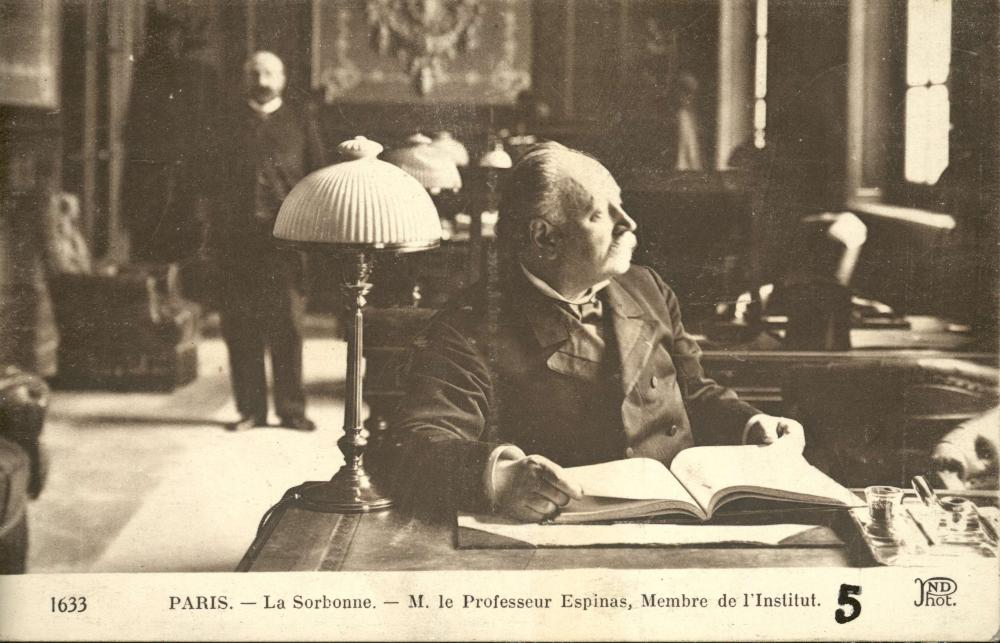

Alfred Victor Espinas (23 May 1844 – 24 February 1922) was a French thinker noted for having been an influence on Nietzsche. He was a student of Comte and Spencer. Although initially an adherent of positivism, he later became a committed realist.

He died in Saint-Florentin, Yonne.

== Works ==
- Des sociétés animales (1877)
- Les origines de la technologie (1897)
- La philosophie sociale du XVIIIe siècle et la Révolution (1898)
- Descartes et la morale: Études sur l'histoire de la philosophie de l'action (1925)
