= 1944 Nobel Prize in Literature =

- Johannes V. Jensen
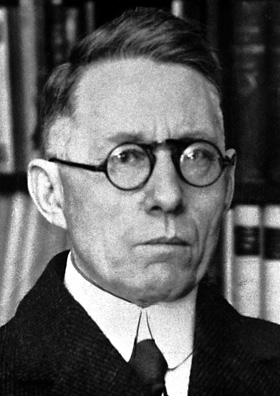
- "for the rare strength and fertility of his poetic imagination with which is combined an intellectual curiosity of wide scope and a bold, freshly creative style."
- Date: 9 November 1944 (announcement); 10 December 1945 (ceremony)
- Location: Stockholm, Sweden
- Presented by: Swedish Academy
- First award: 1901
- Website: Official website

The 1944 Nobel Prize in Literature was awarded to the Danish author Johannes V. Jensen "for the rare strength and fertility of his poetic imagination with which is combined an intellectual curiosity of wide scope and a bold, freshly creative style." He is the fourth Danish recipient of the literary prize.

== Laureate ==
Jensens early works was in the fin-de-siècle pessimism style. He found his own voice as a writer with Himmerlandshistorier ("Himmerland Stories", 1898–1910), comprising a series of tales set in the part of Denmark where he was born. This was followed by the acclaimed historical novel The Fall of the King (1900-1901) centred on the Danish 16th century King Christian II. The novel series Den lange rejse ("The Long Journey", 1908–22), spanning the early history of humanity in six volumes with a focus on evolutionary theory, is regarded as Jensens greatest achievement. In addition to these books, Jensen wrote numerous prose works and essays and was also a prominent poet. His Digte ("Poems", 1906) is regarded as the start of modernist poetry in Denmark.

== Nominations ==
Jensen had been nominated for the Nobel Prize in Literature on 53 occasions since 1925. He was nominated every year between 1931 and 1944. In 1942 the Nobel committee received seven nominations for Jensen, followed by two nominations in 1943 and two nominations in 1944.

In total, the Nobel committee received 24 nominations for 21 writers including Gabriela Mistral (awarded in 1945), Hermann Hesse (awarded in 1946), Enrique Larreta, Johan Huizinga, Georges Duhamel, John Steinbeck (awarded in 1962) and Paul Valéry. Four were newly nominated namely Abol-Gassem E’tessam Zadeh, Luis Nueda y Santiago, Charles Ferdinand Ramuz and Arnulf Øverland. Maria Madalena de Martel Patrício, Henriette Charasson, Elisaveta Bagryana and Gabriela Mistral were the only women nominated.

The authors George Ade, Joaquín Álvarez Quintero, Marc Bloch, Max Brand, Édouard Bourdet, Joseph Campbell, Jean Cavaillès, Irvin S. Cobb, Olive Custance, Eugénio de Castro, Antoine de Saint-Exupéry, Enrique Díez Canedo, Agnes Mary Frances Duclaux, Edith Durham, Benjamin Fondane, Giovanni Gentile, Henri Ghéon, Jean Giraudoux, Philippe Henriot, Max Jacob, Napoleon Lapathiotis, Stephen Leacock, Elsa Lindberg-Dovlette, Filippo Tommaso Marinetti, Kaj Munk, Robert Nichols, Augusta Peaux, Karel Poláček, Armand Praviel, Arthur Quiller-Couch, Miklós Radnóti, Jacques Roumain, Israel Joshua Singer, Ida Tarbell, Florence Trail, Hüseyin Rahmi Gürpınar, Margery Williams, and Harold Bell Wright died in 1944 without having been nominated for the prize.

Official list of nominees and their nominators for the prize
No.	Nominee	Country	Genre(s)	Nominator(s)
1	Elisaveta Bagryana (1893–1991)	Bulgaria	poetry, translation	Stefan Mladenov (1880–1963) (Note: This nomination was originally sent in 1943 but was moved to the nomination list for 1944.)
2	Nikolai Berdyaev (1874–1948)	Soviet Union (Ukraine)	philosophy, theology	Alf Nyman (1884–1968)
3	René Béhaine (1880–1966)	France	novel, short story, essays	Maurice Mignon (1882–1962)
4	Edmund Blunden (1896–1974)	United Kingdom	poetry, essays, biography	Heinrich Wolfgang Donner (1904-1980)
5	Henriette Charasson (1884–1972)	France	poetry, essays, drama, novel, literary criticism, biography	Serge Barrault (1887–1976); Pierre Moreau (1895–1972)
6	Maria Madalena de Martel Patrício (1884–1947)	Portugal	poetry, essays	António Baião (1878–1961)
7	Teixeira de Pascoaes (1877–1952)	Portugal	poetry	João António Mascarenhas Júdice (1898–1957)
8	Georges Duhamel (1884–1966)	France	novel, short story, poetry, drama, literary criticism	Hjalmar Hammarskjöld (1862–1953)
9	Abolhassan E'tesami (1903–1978)	Iran	novel, essays	Issa Sepahbodi (1896–)
10	Vilhelm Grønbech (1873–1948)	Denmark	history, essays, poetry	Sven Lönborg (1871–1959)
11	Hermann Hesse (1877–1962)	Germany; Switzerland	novel, poetry, essays, short story	Anders Österling (1884–1981)
12	Johan Huizinga (1872–1945)	Netherlands	history	Willem van Eysinga (1878–1961)
13	Johannes Vilhelm Jensen (1873–1950)	Denmark	novel, short story, essays	Harry Fett (1875–1962); Carl Adolf Bodelsen (1894–1978)
14	Enrique Larreta (1875–1961)	Argentina	history, essays, drama, novel	Carlos Obligado (1889–1949); Carlos Ibarguren (1877–1956)
15	Gabriela Mistral (1889–1957)	Chile	poetry	Hjalmar Hammarskjöld (1862–1953)
16	Charles Langbridge Morgan (1894–1958)	United Kingdom	drama, novel, essays, poetry	Sigfrid Siwertz (1882–1970)
17	Luis Nueda y Santiago (1883–1952)	Spain	essays	Julio Casares (1877–1964)
18	Arnulf Øverland (1889–1968)	Norway	poetry, essays	Rolv Thesen (1896–1966)
19	Charles Ferdinand Ramuz (1878–1947)	Switzerland	novel, poetry, short story	Sigfrid Siwertz (1882–1970)
20	John Steinbeck (1902–1968)	United States	novel, short story, screenplay	Erik Lönnroth (1910–2002)
21	Paul Valéry (1871–1945)	France	poetry, philosophy, essays, drama	Ernst Paulus Bendz (1880–1966)

== Prize decision ==
Johannes V. Jensen had been nominated for the prize numerous times since 1925 and was considered by the Nobel committee as a strong contender since 1940. Committee chair Per Hallström opposed a prize to Jensen for his modernist tendencies that Hallström found "repulsive" and "brutal". Committee members Anders Österling and Sigfrid Siwertz advocated a prize to Jensen and eventually won support within the Swedish Academy to award him the 1944 Nobel Prize in Literature. The New York Times reported that Anders Österling days before the announcement had revealed that Ernest Hemingway, Willa Cather, John Steinbeck and Gabriela Mistral were among the contenders for the 1944 prize.

== Award ceremony ==
On 10 December 1944 a luncheon was held at the Waldorf-Astoria in New York in place of the customary ceremony in Stockholm. Per Hallström, chairman of the Nobel committee of the Swedish Academy, delivered a lecture on the Nobel Prize laureate in literature that was broadcast the same day. Unable to attend the 1944 award ceremony, Johannes V. Jensen received his prize at Stockholm on 10 December 1945.

At the award ceremony in Stockholm on 10 December 1945 Anders Österling, permanent secretary of the Swedish Academy said:

This child of the dry and windy moors of Jutland has, almost out of spite, astonished his contemporaries by a remarkably prolific production. He could well be considered one of the most fertile Scandinavian writers. He has constructed a vast and imposing literary œuvre, comprising the most diverse genres: epic and lyric, imaginative and realistic works, as well as historical and philosophical essays, not to mention his scientific excursions in all directions.
