= Jeanne Lapauze =

French poet and novelist

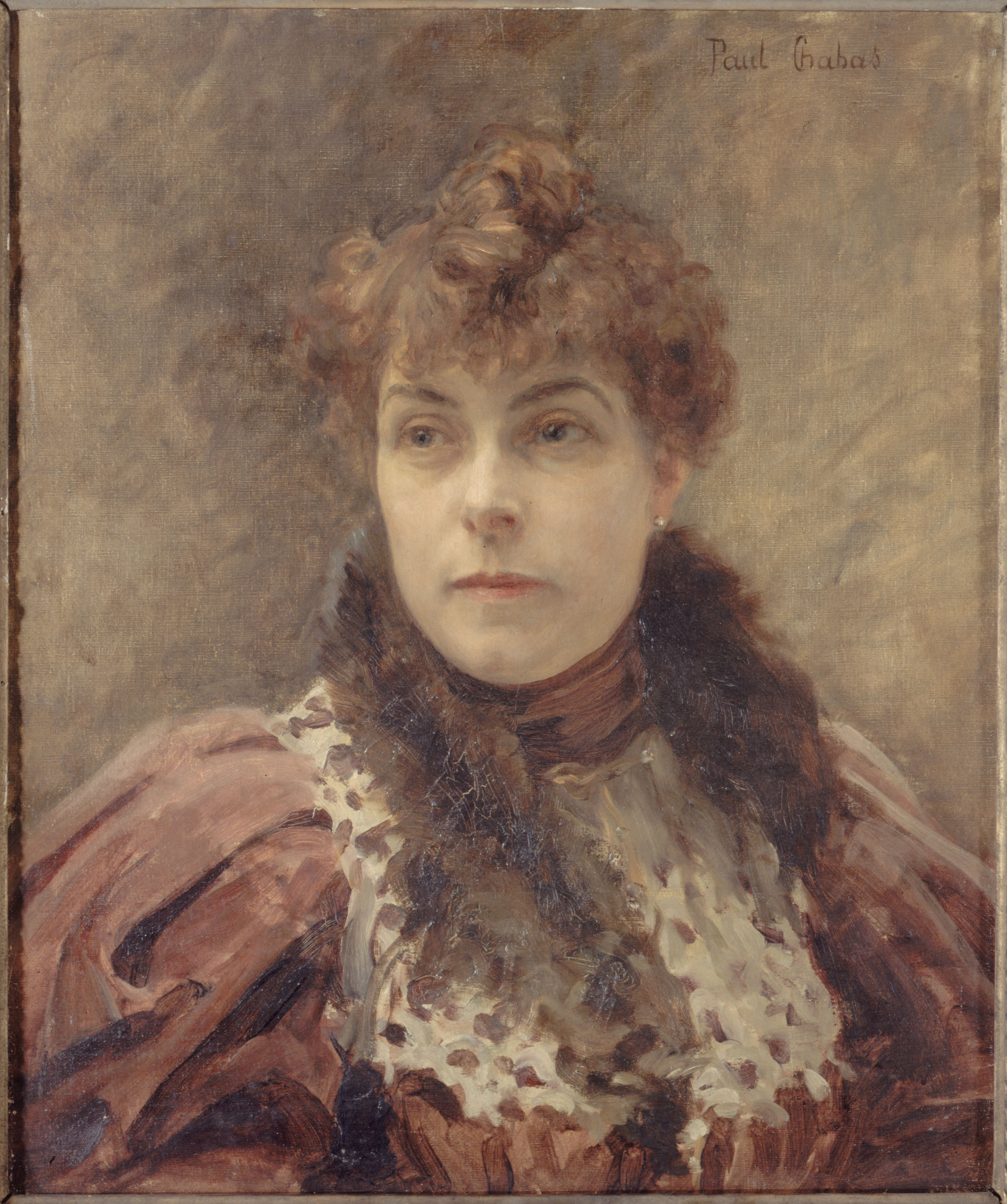
- Portrait of Daniel Lesueur, painted by Paul Émile Chabas
- Born: Jeanne Lapauze; 6 March 1854; Batignolles-Monceau
- Died: 3 January 1921 (aged 66); Paris
- Occupations: Poet; Novelist

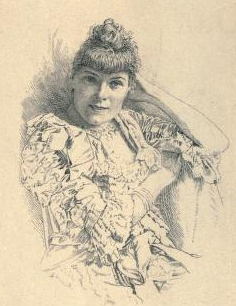
Frontispice of the book Les Poesies by Daniel Lesueur published in 1896 and representing Daniel Lesueur, young girl (1854–1921)

Jeanne Lapauze, née Loiseau (1860–1920) was a French poet and novelist who used the pen name Daniel Lesueur.

== Biography ==
She was born in the vicinity of Paris. Her volume of poems, Fleurs d'avril (1882), was crowned by the Académie française. She also wrote some powerful novels dealing with contemporary life.

Her poems were collected in 1882, Fleurs d'Avril; 1884, Sursum corda !, Great Prize by Académie française; and 1895, Rêves et Visions. She published in 1905 a book on the economic status of women: L'Evolution feminine; and in 1891-1893, a two volume translation of the works of Lord Byron, which was awarded another prize by the Académie.

Her Masque d'amour, a five-act play based on her novel (1904) of the same name, was produced at the Théâtre Sarah Bernhardt in 1905. She received the ribbon of the Legion of Honor in 1900 and 1913, and the Prix Vitet from the French Academy in 1905. She married in 1904 Henry Lapauze, a well-known writer on art.

== Works ==
- Le mariage de Gabrielle, 1882 (novel, édit. Calmann-Lévy), prix Montyon of the Académie françaiseRead online
- Fleurs d’avril, poèmes, 1882 (poésies, edit. Lemerre), prix Montyon of the Académie française
- L’amant de Geneviève, 1883 (novel, Calmann Lévy)
- Marcelle, étude parisienne, 1885 (novel, edit. Lemerre)
- "Sursum corda !" pièce de vers…, 1885 (édit. Lemerre) Grand prix de Poésie de l’Académie française
- Un mystérieux amour, 1886 (novel, edit. Lemerre)
- Amour d’aujourd’hui, 1888 (novel, edit. Lemerre). Read online
- Rêves et visions. Souvenirs; Visions divines; Visions antiques; Sonnets philosophiques; Échos et reflets; Paroles d’amitié; Paroles d’amour. 1889 (edit. Lemerre) Couronné par l’Académie française (prix Archon-Despérouses)
- L’Auberge des Saules, 1890 (novel, edit. Lemerre)
- Névrosée, 1890 (novel, edit. Lemerre).Read online
- Pour les pauvres, prologue dit par Mlle Rachel Boyer… sous la tente Willis, à la Ville-d’Avray le 23 juin 1889, 1890
- Une vie tragique, 1890 (novel, edit. Lemerre)
- Passion slave, 1892 (novel, edit. Lemerre)
- Justice de femme, 1893 (novel, edit. Lemerre)
- Haine d’amour, 1894 (novel, edit. Lemerre)
- À force d’aimer, 1895 (novel, edit. Lemerre)
- Poésies de Daniel Lesueur : Visions divines; les vrais dieux; Visions antiques; Sonnets philosophiques; "Sursum corda !" Souvenirs; Paroles d’amour, 1896 (edit. Lemerre)
- Invincible charme, 1897 (novel, edit. Lemerre)
- Comédienne, 1898 (novel, edit. Lemerre), couronné par l'Académie française (prix de Jouy)
- Lèvres closes, 1898 (novel, edit. Lemerre)
- Au-delà de l’amour, 1899 (novel, edit. Lemerre)
- La Fleur de joie, 1900 (novel, edit. Lemerre)
- Lointaine Revanche, 1900 (2 volumes ), dont :
- L’Or sanglant (1er vol.), 1900 (novel, edit. Lemerre)
- La Fleur de Joie (2° vol.), 1900 (novel, edit. Lemerre)
- Fiancée d’outre-mer. Péril d’amour. Justice mondaine. Une mère, 1901 (edit. Lemerre)
- L’Honneur d’une femme, 1901 (novel, edit. Lemerre)
- Mortel secret, 1902 (2 volumes), including:
- Lys Royal (1er vol.), 1902 (novel, edit. Lemerre)
- Le Meurtre d’une âme (2° vol.), 1902 (novel, edit. Lemerre)
- Le Cœur chemine, 1903 (novel, edit. Lemerre)
- Le masque d'amour, 1904 (2 volumes), including:
- Le Marquis de Valcor (1er vol.), 1904 (novel, edit. Lemerre)
- Madame de Ferneuse (2° vol.), 1904 (novel, edit. Lemerre)
- Le masque d’amour : play in 5 acts and 7 tableaux, 1905 (L'Illustration)
- L’évolution féminine, ses résultats économiques, 1905 (edit. Lemerre)
- La Force du passé, 1905 (novel, edit. Lemerre)
- Calvaire de femme, 1907 (2 volumes), including:
- Fils de l’amant (1er vol.), 1907 (novel, edit. Lemerre)
- Madame l’ambassadrice (2° vol.), 1907 (novel, edit. Lemerre)
- Nietzschéenne, 1907 (novel, edit. Plon).Read online
- Le droit à la force, 1909 (novel)
- Du sang dans les ténèbres, 1910 (2 volumes), including:
- Flaviana princesse (1er vol.), 1910 (novel)
- Chacune son rêve (2) vol.), 1910 (novel)
- Une âme de vingt ans, 1911 (novel)
- Au tournant des jours (Gilles de Claircœur), novel, 1913
- Un foyer du soldat au front. Le foyer du soldat Mary Mather à l’armée du général Humbert, 1919 (monograph)
- Traduction des Œuvres complètes de lord Byron. Traduction nouvelle, précédée d'un essai sur lord Byron (édit. Lemerre, 1891) Les 2 premiers volumes sont couronnés par l'Académie française (prix Langlois); un 3° et dernier volume sortira en 1905 (édit. Lemerre).
- Pour bien tenir sa maison, 1911 (preface by Daniel Lesueur, collection Femina-Bibliothèque)
