= Jacinto Benavente =

Spanish dramatist (1866–1954)

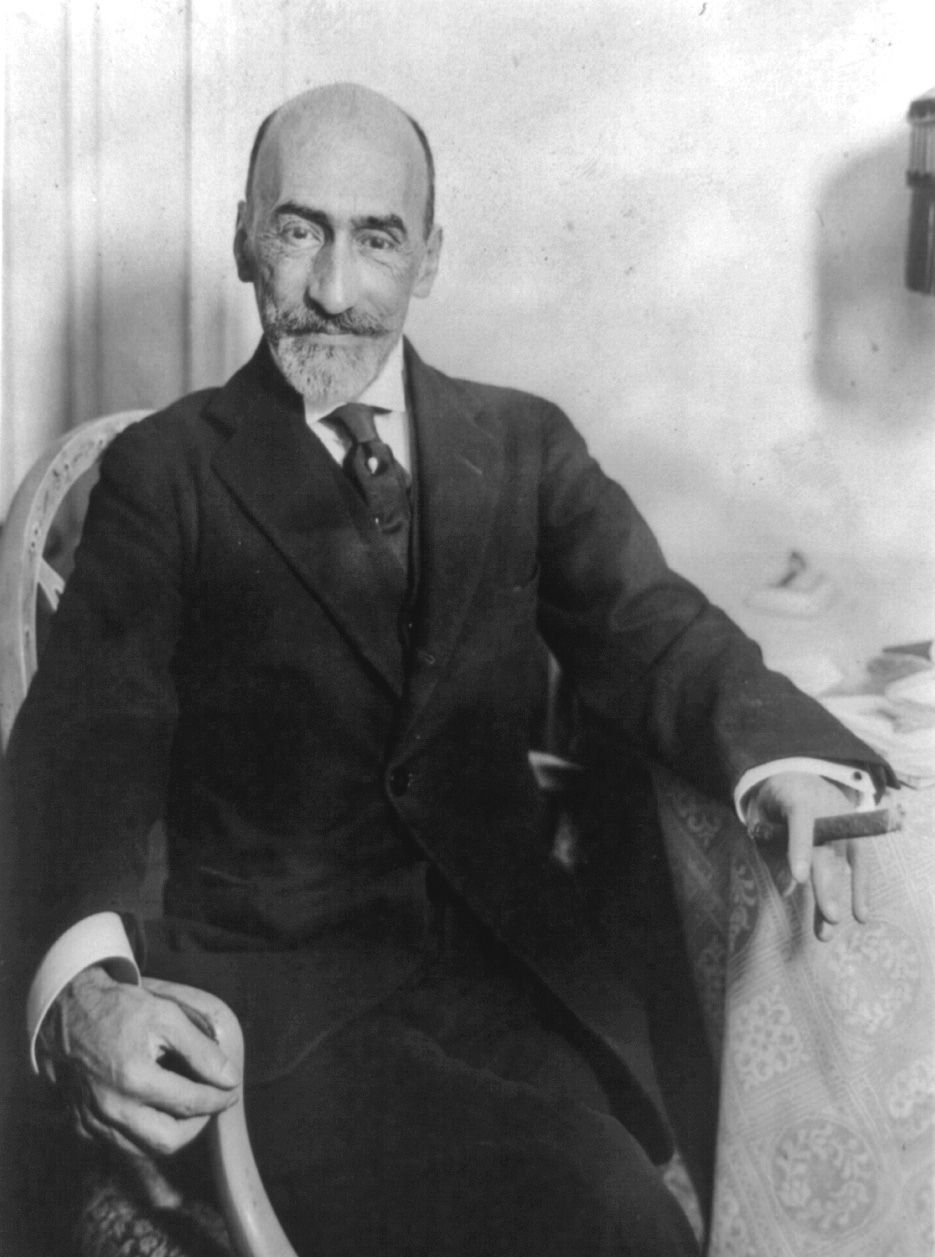
- Born: 12 August 1866; Madrid, Spain
- Died: 14 July 1954 (aged 87); Madrid, Spain
- Writing career
- Notable awards: Nobel Prize in Literature; 1922

Jacinto Benavente y Martínez (Spanish: [xaˈθinto βenaˈβente]; 12 August 1866 – 14 July 1954) was one of the foremost Spanish dramatists of the 20th century. He was awarded the 1922 Nobel Prize in Literature "for the happy manner in which he has continued the illustrious traditions of the Spanish drama".

== Biography ==
Born in Madrid, the son of a celebrated pediatrician, he returned drama to reality by way of social criticism: declamatory verse giving way to prose, melodrama to comedy, formula to experience, impulsive action to dialogue and the play of minds. Benavente showed a preoccupation with aesthetics and later with ethics.

A liberal monarchist and a critic of socialism, he was a reluctant supporter of Francoist Spain as the only viable alternative to what he considered the disastrous republican experiment of 1931–1936. In 1936 Benavente's name became associated with the assassination of the Spanish poet and dramatist Federico García Lorca. This happened when the Nationalist newspapers Estampa, El Correo de Andalucia, and Ideal circulated a fake news story that Lorca had been killed as a reprisal for the Republican murder of Benavente. Benavente died in Aldeaencabo de Escalona (Toledo) at the age of 87. He never married. According to many sources, he was a gay man.

== Principal works ==
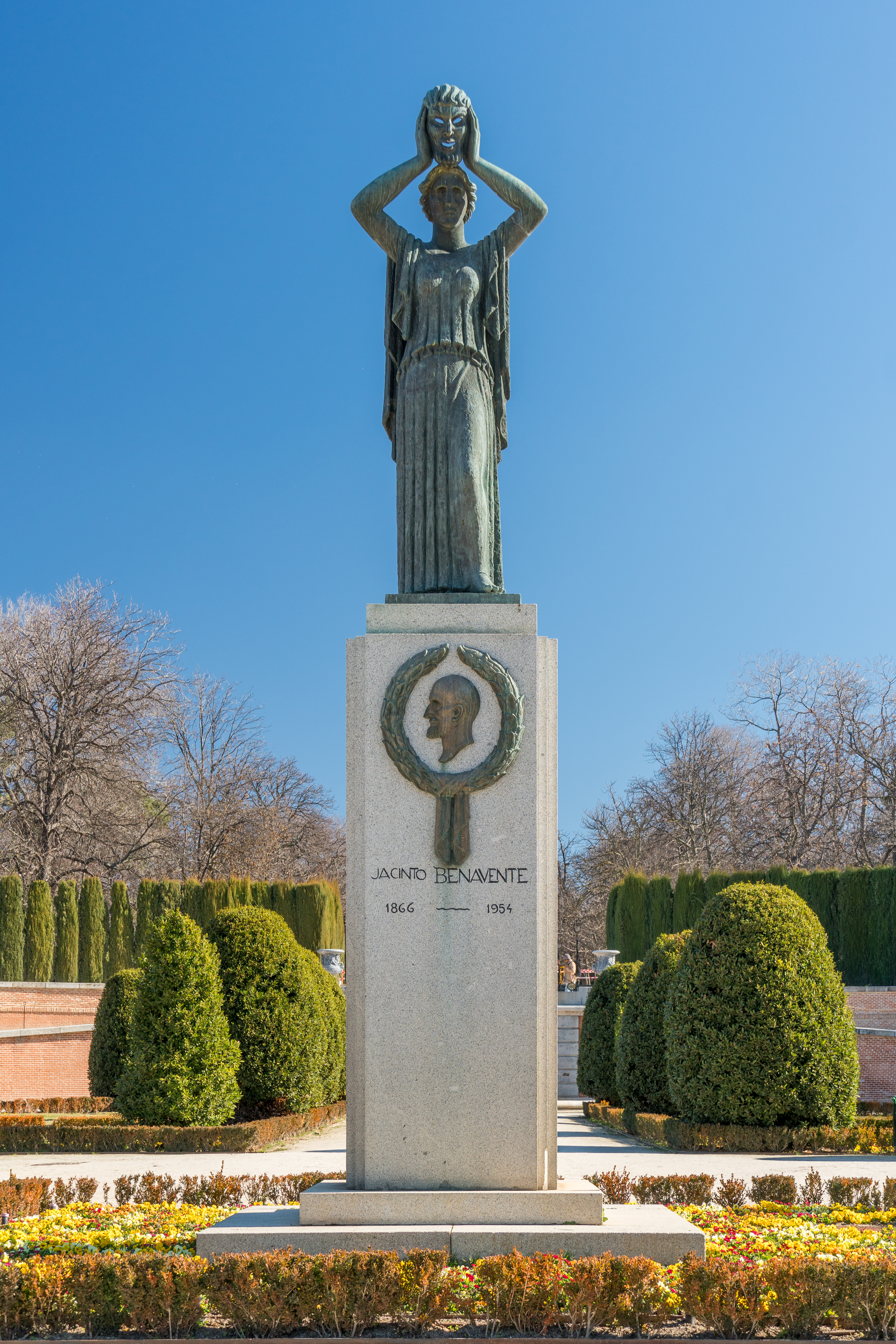
Jacinto Benavente Monument inside Retiro Park in Madrid, Spain

Jacinto Benavente wrote 172 works. Among his most important works are:

- El nido ajeno (Another's Nest, 1894), comedy, three acts.
- Gente conocida (High Society, 1896), satirical scenes of modern life, four acts.
- La Gobernadora (The Governor's Wife, 1901), comedy, three acts.
- La noche del sábado (Saturday Night, 1903), stage romance, five divisions; Imperia is a ballerina and later prostitute who falls in love with Prince Miguel, who will take the throne of Swabia.
- Rosas de otoño (Autumnal Roses, 1905), sentimental comedy, three acts.
- Los intereses creados (The Bonds of Interest, 1907), comedy of masks based on the Italian commedia dell'arte; Benavente's most famous and often performed work.
- Señora ama (The Lady of the House, 1908), rural drama; a penetrating psychological study of a woman jealous of her husband.
- El príncipe que todo lo aprendió en los libros (1909)
- The Unloved Woman (La malquerida), 1913), rural psychological drama, three acts; the basis for the 1921 film The Passion Flower, starring Norma Talmadge.
- La ciudad alegre y confiada (1916), continuation from Los intereses creados.
- Campo de armiño (1916)
- Lecciones de buen amor (1924)
- La mariposa que voló sobre el mar (1926)
- Pepa Doncel (1928)
- Vidas cruzadas (1929)
- Aves y pájaros (1940)
- La honradez de la cerradura (1942)
- La infanzona (1945)
- Titania (1946)
- La infanzona (1947)
- Abdicación (1948)
- Ha llegado Don Juan (1952)
- El alfiler en la boca (1954)
- Hijos, padres de sus padres (Sons, Fathers of Their Parents, 1954)
