= Bertel Gripenberg =

Finland-Swedish poet

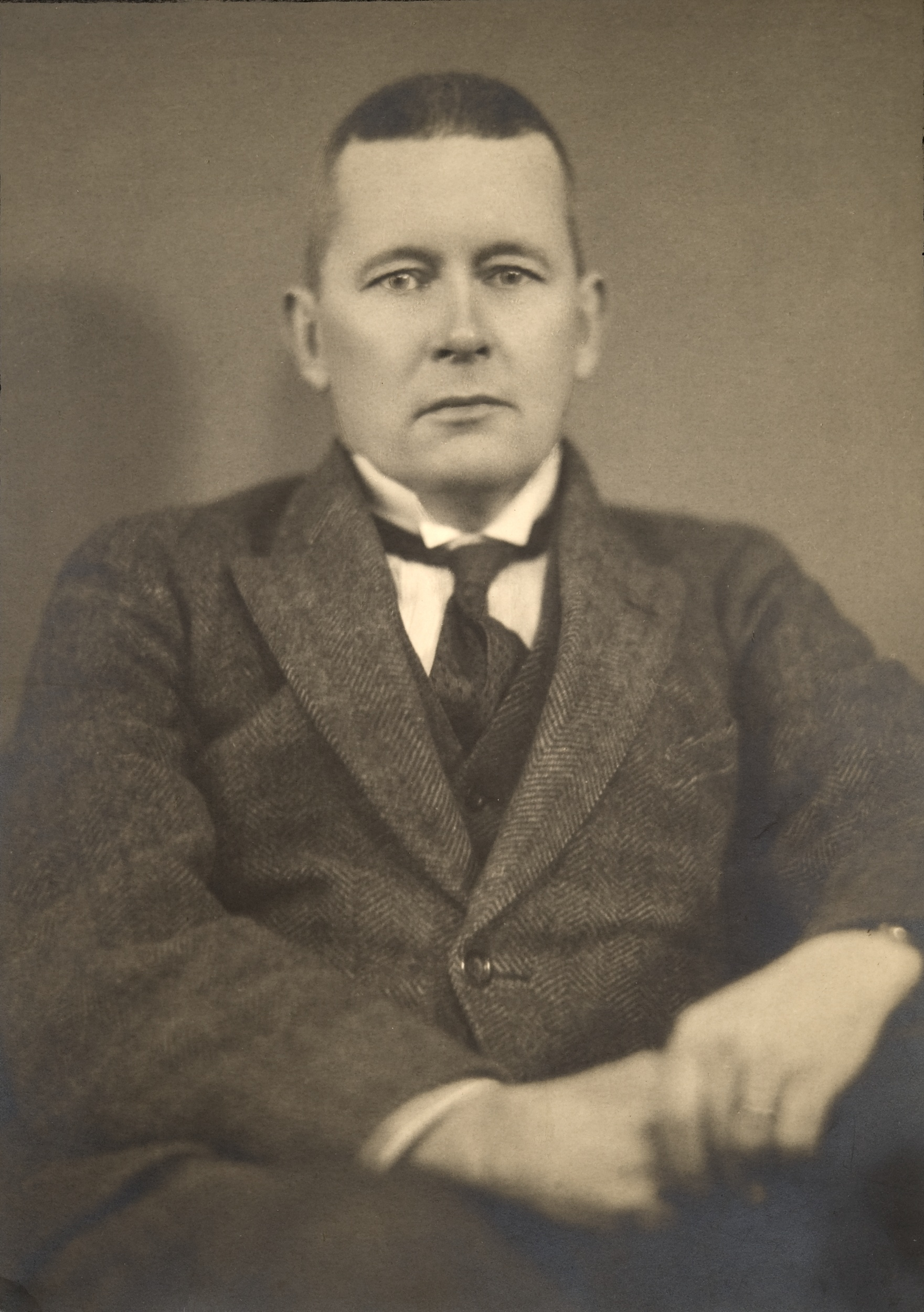
- Gripenberg in the 1920s
- Born: 19 September 1878; Saint Petersburg, Russia
- Died: 6 May 1947 (aged 68); Sävsjö, Sweden
- Occupation: Poet
- Writing career
- Language: Swedish
- Period: 1903—1947

Bertel Johan Sebastian, Baron Gripenberg (19 September 1878 in Saint Petersburg – 6 May 1947) was a Finland-Swedish poet. He was nominated for the Nobel Prize in Literature fourteen times.

== Career ==
His early poetry was inspired by fin de siècle eroticism, which was followed by an interest in ethics in the poetry published between 1908 and 1917. After that came a more militaristic and political period, in collections such as Under fanan (1918), Efter striden (1925) and Den stora tiden (1928). In a fourth and last period Gripenberg's poetry became more introspective.

Gripenberg's 1925 poetry collection Den hemliga glöden, published under the pseudonym Åke Erikson, is a parody of modernist poetry. He also translated English and Finnish works into Swedish. Among his more prominent translations are Johannes Linnankoski's novel The Song of the Blood-Red Flower and Edgar Lee Masters' Spoon River Anthology.

From an early age Gripenberg had a disdain for egalitarian thought and parliamentary democracy, and participated on the White side in the Finnish Civil War. His 1918 poem "Den drömda armén" (The dreamed army) has been interpreted as a prediction of the Winter War. He joined the Lapua Movement but looked down on the Fascist and National Socialist movements which he found to be plebeian. Regardless he enthusiastically supported Germany in the Second World War. He participated in the Peasant March to Helsinki in the summer of 1930, but after that rarely took part in any public political activity.

== Selected works ==
Poetry

- 1903 – Dikter
- 1904 – Vida vägar
- 1905 – Gallergrinden
- 1907 – Rosenstaden
- 1908 – Svarta sonetter
- 1909 – Drifsnö
- 1911 – Aftnar i Tavastland
- 1918 – Under fanan
- 1922 – Kanonernas röst
- 1923 – Efter striden
- 1925 – Den hemliga glöden (under the pseudonym Åke Erikson)
- 1925 – Skymmande land
- 1928 – Den stora tiden
- 1930 – Vid gränsen
- 1933 – Livets eko
- 1941 – Sista ronden
- 1947 – Genom gallergrinden (posthumous)

Prose and drama

- 1909 – Vid mörkrets portar
- 1910 – Det brinnande landet
- 1918 – En dröm om folkviljan
- 1925 – På Dianas vägar

== Accolades ==
- 1913 – Tollanderska priset
- 1916 – De Nios Stora Pris
- 1930 – De Nios Stora Pris
- 1940 – De Nios Stora Pris
