= Robert Eugen Zachrisson =

Robert Eugen Zachrisson, born 15 January 1880 in Karlskrona, Sweden and died 28 July 1937, was a Swedish philologist.

Zachrisson became a student in 1900, Bachelor of Arts in 1902, Licentiate of Philosophy in 1908, PhD and Associate Professor in the English language in 1909, all at the University of Lund. He was from 1910 to 1921 a Lecturer in German and English at the Högre lärarinneseminariet in Stockholm, and was named to the professorship of English in Uppsala in 1911 and in Gothenburg in 1913 as the professor of English at the University of Uppsala. There his students included Rune Forsberg. Zachrisson's efforts in philology consist partly of historically oriented theses, in toponymy and pronunciation history, and of modern grammar and stylistics.

Zachrisson discussed Nordic influences in English place-names in his research, as well as Roman, Celtic and Saxon influence on English, and the etymology of place-names. His further work added to our understanding of the pronunciation rules and history of pronunciation in Modern English from 1400-1700, and especially during Shakespeare's time. In 1930, Zachrisson made a noted effort in the issue of world languages by launching a simplified English spelling system: Anglic. He also founded the journal Studia Neophilologica in 1928. At the time of his death, he was working to create a dictionary of Old English place-names.

== Selected bibliography ==
- A Contribution to the Study of Anglo-Norman Influence on English Place-Names (1909)
- Some Instances of Latin Influence on English Place-Nomenclature (1911)
- Pronunciation of English Vowels 1400-1700 (1913)
- Two Instances of French Influence on English Place-Names (1914)
- Shakespeares uttal (1914)
- Northern English or London English as the Standard Pronunciation ("A Contribution to the History of Standard English"; 1914)
- Engelska stilarter med textprov (1919)
- Tysk, engelsk och internationell tanke (1920)
- Change of ts to ch, ds to dg and Other Instances of Sound-Substitution (1921)
- Engelsk nybörjarbok (1921)
- Sunt förnuft om skolförslaget (1923)
- Lärobok i engelska (1924)
- English River-Names (1926)
- English Pronunciation of Shakespeare's Time (1927)
- Romans, Kelts and Saxons (1927)
- Thomas Hardy (1928)
- Modern engelsk väridsåskådning i litteraturens spegel (1928)
