= Arno Holz =

German naturalist poet and dramatist

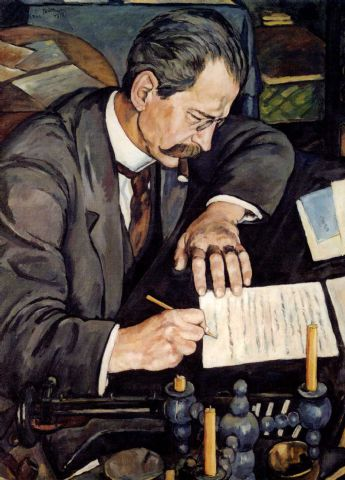
- Born: Rastenburg, East Prussia
- Died: October 1929
- Writing career
- Notable work: Phantasus

Arno Hermann Oscar Alfred Holz (26 April 1863 – October 1929) was a German naturalist poet and dramatist. He is best known for his poetry collection Phantasus (1898). He was nominated for a Nobel prize in literature nine times.

== Life and Works ==
Holz was born in Rastenburg, East Prussia (now Kętrzyn, Poland), the son of pharmacist Hermann Holz and Franziska née Werner. The family moved to Berlin in 1875. After his schooling, Holz worked in 1881 as a journalist but chose a living as a freelance writer. He was beset with financial difficulties for much of his life. He established contacts with the Berlin naturalist club Durch where he met famed writer Gerhart Hauptmann. In 1885 his poetry collection, Buch der Zeit (book of time) won the Schiller Prize. Around this time, Holz was fascinated by Darwinism.

From 1888 onward Holz lived and worked together with translator and writer Johannes Schlaf. Together they developed a theory of "consistent naturalism" in their programmatic text, Art: its Nature and its Laws, wherein they aimed to provide art an exact description and incorporated colloquial elements. They tried, in their description, to eliminate subjectivity from art, to the extent it was scientifically possible, summarized in Holz's formula,

Art = Nature − x

where x is the materials needed to produce art. Ideally, art is to be as close to nature as possible, and it is the artist's responsibility to minimize x in this formula. Holz and Schlaf attempted to apply the theoretical postulate of "consistent naturalism" in their joint works, Papa Hamlet and Die Familie Selicke, plays published under the pseudonym Bjarne P. Holmsen (premiered 1890 in Berlin and Madeburg). The demand that art should be an accurate reproduction of reality lead to new experimental modes of expression – for example, the "second by second style" (German: Sekundenstil) in which social deprivation is described in exact minute detail in real time. Reception of Papa Hamlet was quite varied. Most critics deplored it, but others, including Theodor Fontane, found it contained high artistic value.

Schlaf and Holz quarreled over revenue from the two plays, which was relatively modest, causing a break in their relations. Holz claimed he could have done more and had contributed more artistically to both works. Holz went on to experiment with unrhymed styles breaking traditional rules of form. He claimed works should be determined by "inner rhythm" and free from regular rhyme and versification. He laid down these principles in his writing, Revolution in Poetry (1899).

In 1893 he married Emilie Wittenberg with whom he had three sons.

In 1896 Holz commenced work on a dramatic cycle, Berlin inspired by Zola's series of novels, Rougon-Macquart. His work, Change in Dramatic Time, originally drawn from twenty five separate pieces, remains unfinished in three works: the comedy Socialaristokraten ("Social Aristocrats," 1896) and the tragedies Eclipse (1908) and Ignorabimus (1913). These late dramas failed with contemporary theater audiences; the book editions, in spite of numerous revisions, found few buyers.

In 1898 Holz published his masterpiece, the poetry volume Phantasus, a work in which he displayed his linguistic virtuosity. The work describes the milieu of slighted hungry poets of Holz's own Wedding neighborhood in Berlin. Holz had worked on the poems throughout his creative life, often amending, casting aside, and revisiting his varied texts. A typographical feature of the poetry is that all the lines are centered on an axis giving both a right and left ragged edge (common in the modern day of computers but rare at the time). For example, the following (practically untranslatable) passage about St. George's Church in Rastenburg, from "Childhood paradise"

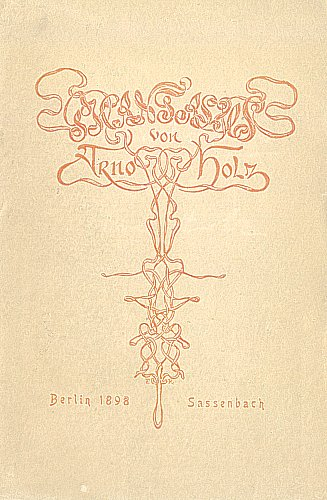
Title page of the 1898 edition of Phantasus with Art Nouveau decoration

...
landfernhin schauenden, landfernhin lugenden, landfernhin
sichtbaren
Burgbelfriedtürme
der massig, der mächtig, der
wuchtig
der
sturmtrotzig, ehrwürdig, bollwerkkühn,
letztzufluchtstark
stolzen,
feldsteinuntermauerten, ziegelstumpfbraunrötlichen,
berghügelkrönenden,
strebepfeilerigen, sternkreuzgewölbigen,
buntfensterigen
Sankt
Georgenkirche.

[... / looking out remotely on the country, peeping out on the country, remotely from the country / visible / castle belfry towers / of massive, of mighty, of / powerful / of / storm defying, venerable, boldly bulwarked / the last refuge / proud / underpinned by fieldstones, dull reddish brown bricked / mountain hill crowning / buttressed, starry cross-vaulted / colorfully windowed / Saint / George's Church]

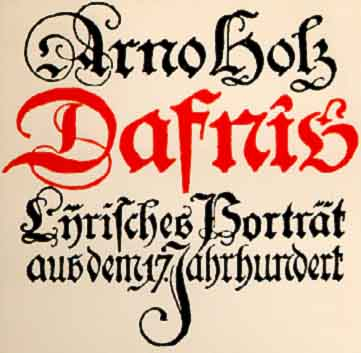
"Dafnis" (1904)

In 1903, he wrote Songs on an old Lute inspired by the poetry of the Baroque era. This volume was later expanded as Dafnis and published by Reinhard Piper, and one of Holz's few financial successes. The poems incorporated in the volume's, design, subject, and layout celebrations of Baroque eating and erotic events. Holz also received recognition for his tragicomedy Traumulus (1904), the first of five he created with his friend Oskar Jerschke. The work was produced on many stages upon its publication and in 1935 it became the basis of a film produced by Carl Froelich starring Emil Jannings in the title role.

Between 1910 and 1929 Holz lived in the Schöneberg district of Berlin. He divorced and remarried in 1926, and is buried in an honored grave at the Friedhof Heerstrasse. Several monuments have been erected in his honor.
