= Paul Ernst (German writer) =

German writer, dramatist, critic, and journalist

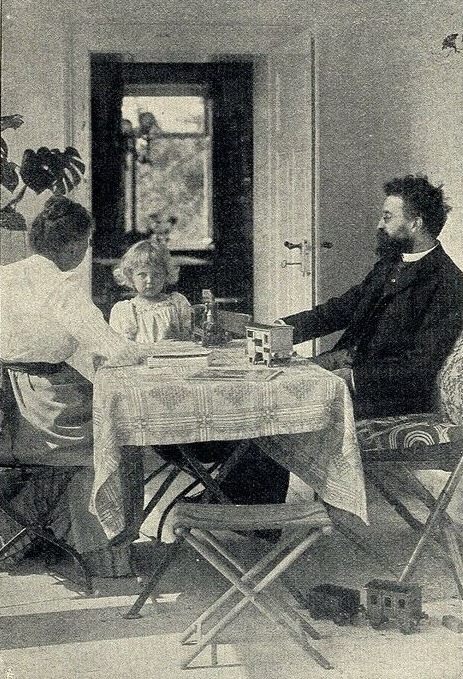
Paul Ernst with his in Weimar, c. 1904

Karl Friedrich Paul Ernst (7 March 1866, Elbingerode – 13 May 1933, Styria) was a German writer, dramatist, critic and journalist.
