= 1928 Nobel Prize in Literature =

Award

- Sigrid Undset
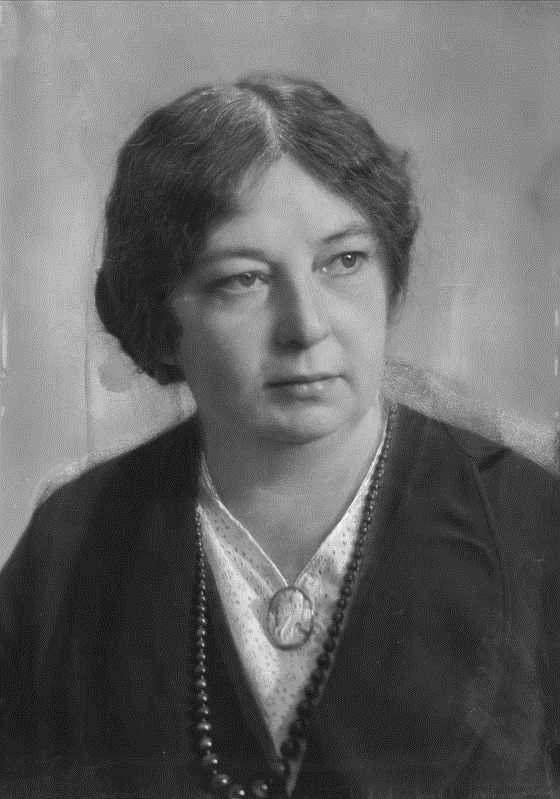
- "principally for her powerful descriptions of Northern life during the Middle Ages."
- Date: 13 November 1928 (Note: The Swedish Academy decided on 13th November 1928 that the 1927 Nobel Prize in Literature should be awarded to Henri Bergson and that this year's Nobel Prize in Literature should be awarded to Sigrid Undset.) (announcement); 10 December 1928 (ceremony)
- Location: Stockholm, Sweden
- Presented by: Swedish Academy
- First award: 1901
- Website: Official website

The 1928 Nobel Prize in Literature was awarded to the Danish-born Norwegian novelist Sigrid Undset (1882–1949) "principally for her powerful descriptions of Northern life during the Middle Ages." She is the third female recipient of the literature prize.

== Laureate ==
Sigrid Undset's writing career started by focusing on strong, contemporary women struggling for emancipation. Inspired by her archeologist father, she later turned to writing about the Middle Ages as seen in Fortællingen om Viga-Ljot og Vigdis ("Gunnar's Daughter", 1909) and tetralogy Olav Audunssøn i Hestviken og Olav Audunssøn og Hans Børn ("The Master of Hestviken", 1925–27). Her best known work is Kristin Lavransdatter (1920–1922),

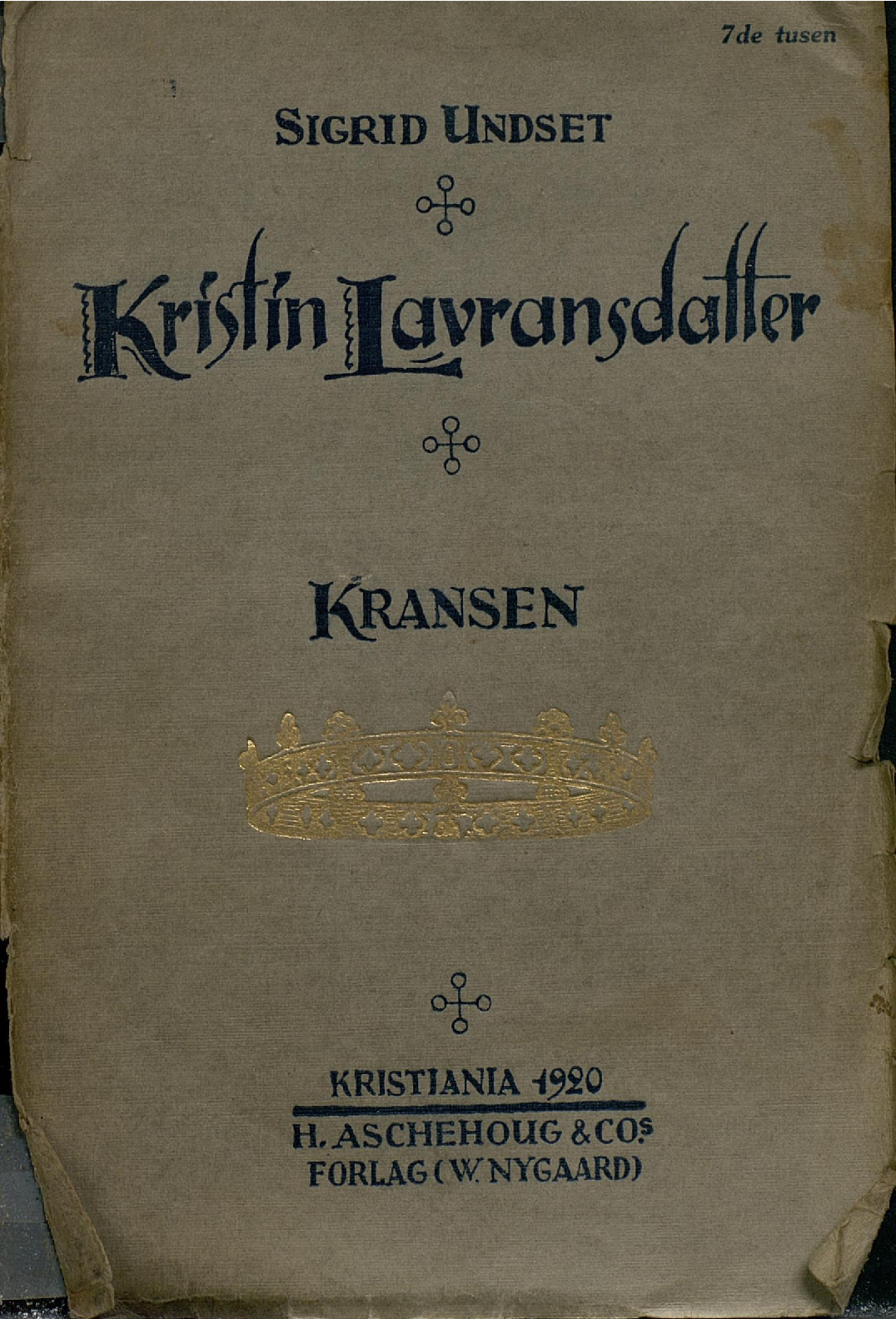
First edition cover of Kristin Lavransdatter: The Wreath by Aschehoug.

which deals with themes of honor, religious faith, and the common life shared by women and men in 15th-century Norway. According to the Swedish Academy, Undset brings to life the medieval times with solid historical knowledge, deep psychological insight, a vivid imagination, and a vigorous language. Being a convert to Catholicism, she expressed her religiosity by writing a biographical novel on St. Catherine of Siena and a hagiographical collection Sagaen om de Hellige ("Saga of Saints", 1934).

== Deliberations ==
=== Nominations ===
Sigrid Undset was only nominated in four occasions (1922, 1925, 1926, and 1928). Her last nomination which led to her being awarded the Nobel prize came from the proposal of the Norwegian psychologist Helga Eng (1875–1966).

In total, the Swedish Academy received 48 nominations for 36 writers. Thirteen of the nominees were newly nominated such as Hans Driesch, Ricarda Huch, Felix Timmermans, Theodor Däubler, Armando Palacio Valdés, Rufino Blanco Fombona, Blanca de los Ríos, Anna de Noailles, and Edith Howes. The highest number of nominations (with three nomination letters each) were for the German writer Paul Ernst and the French philosopher Henri Bergson (awarded for 1927). There were six female nominees: Blanca de los Ríos, Edith Howes, Ricarda Huch, Edith Wharton, Concha Espina de la Serna, and Anna de Noailles.

The authors Vicente Blasco Ibáñez, François de Curel, Robert de Flers, Brian Oswald Donn-Byrne, Edmund Gosse, Avery Hopwood, Oskar Jerschke, Henry Festing Jones, Juan Bautista Justo, Ladislav Klíma, Charlotte Mew, Barry Pain, Frank Ramsey, George Ranetti, José Eustasio Rivera, Max Scheler, Aron Hector Schmitz (known as Italo Svevo), Antonín Sova, Sir George Trevelyan, Paul van Ostaijen, Stanley John Weyman, Adela Zamudio and Elinor Wylie died without having been nominated for the prize.

Official list of nominees and their nominators for the prize
No.	Nominee	Country	Genre(s)	Nominator(s)
1	Rudolf Hans Bartsch (1873–1952)	Austria	novel, short story, essays, drama	Oswald Redlich (1858–1944)
2	Henri Bergson (1859–1941)	France	philosophy	3 professors of history of philosophy; 19 members of the Académie des Sciences Morales et Politiques; 16 members of the Académie Française
3	Rufino Blanco Fombona (1874–1844)	Venezuela	essays, literary criticism	Royal Spanish Academy (Note: Other unrecorded nominations were also made for Rufino Blanco Fombosa.)
4	Georg Bonne (1859–1945)	Germany	essays	professors (Note: Georg Bonne's nominations were made by professors from Kiel, Halle (Saale), Freiburg im Breisgau, and others.)
5	Paul Bourget (1852–1935)	France	novel, short story, literary criticism, essays	René Bazin (1853–1932)
6	Otokar Březina (1868–1929)	Czechoslovakia	poetry, essays	Otokar Fischer (1883–1938) (Note: A. Novak and O. Fischer, as well as other nominating professors, were from the universities in Brno, Prague and Pressburg (now Bratislava), all in Czechoslovakia.); Arne Novák (1880–1939)
7	Olaf Bull (1883–1933)	Norway	poetry	Jens Thiis (1870–1942)
8	Blanca de los Ríos (1859–1956)	Spain	poetry, novel, short story, essays	Leopoldo Eijo Garay (1878–1963) (Note: Blanca de los Rios de Lampérez was nominated by A. Rubió i Lluch and L. Eijo Garay, both members of the Spanish Academy); Antoni Rubió i Lluch (1856–1937)
9	Anna de Noailles (1876–1933)	France	novel, poetry, essays	Tor Hedberg (1862–1931)
10	Theodor Däubler (1876–1934)	Italy; Germany	poetry, essays	Oskar Walzel (1864–1944)
11	Olav Duun (1876–1939)	Norway	novel, short story	Halvdan Koht (1873–1965)
12	Hans Driesch (1867–1941)	Germany	philosophy	Kurt Breysig (1866–1940)
13	Paul Ernst (1866–1933)	Germany	novel, short story, drama, essays	Robert Faesi (1883–1972) (Note: Paul Ernst was nominated by E. Ermatinger and R. Faesi, both professors of German literature at the University of Zurich); Edmund Stengel (1845–1935); Emil Ermatinger (1873–1953)
14	Concha Espina de la Serna (1869–1955)	Spain	novel, short story	Rodolfo Lenz (1863–1938); Fredrik Wulff (1845–1930)
15	Édouard Estaunié (1862–1942)	France	novel, literary criticism	Erik Staaff (1867–1936)
16	James George Frazer (1854–1941)	United Kingdom	history, essays, translation	Martin Persson Nilsson (1874–1967)
17	Maxim Gorky (1868–1936)	Soviet Union	novel, short story, drama, memoir, autobiography, essays, poetry	Tor Hedberg (1862–1931); Verner von Heidenstam (1859–1940)
18	Ivan Grozev (1872–1957)	Bulgaria	drama, poetry, literary criticism	Mikhail Arnaudov (1878–1978)
19	Vilhelm Grønbech (1873–1948)	Denmark	history, essays, poetry	Johannes Pedersen (1883–1977)
20	Arno Holz (1863–1929)	Germany	poetry, drama	German professors (Note: Arno Holz was nominated by a large number of German professors, several of whom were eligible to make a nomination.); Hermann Bahr (1863–1934)
21	Rudolf Maria Holzapfel (1874–1930)	Austria	philosophy, essays	3 members of the Prussian Academy of Arts (Note: Rudolf Maria Holzapfel was nominated by 3 members of the Prussian Academy of Arts. Nominations were also made by professors from Bern, Switzerland and Chicago, Illinois, United States, and others.); Romain Rolland (1866–1944)
22	Edith Howes (1872–1954)	New Zealand	novel, short story, drama, essays, pedagogy	Francis Prendeville Wilson (1874–1950)
23	Ricarda Huch (1864–1947)	Germany	history, essays, novel, poetry	Johannes Sundwall (1877–1966); professors from the universities in Switzerland (Note: Ricarda Huch was nominated by professors from Bern and Freiburg, Jena, Berlin, Erlangen, Göttingen, Leipzig, Heidelberg and Munich, and others.)
24	Johannes Vilhelm Jensen (1873–1950)	Denmark	novel, short story, poetry	Frederik Poulsen (1876–1950)
25	Willem Kloos (1859–1938)	Netherlands	poetry, essays, literary criticism	Albert Verwey (1865–1937)
26	Karl Kraus (1874–1936)	Austria	essays, drama, poetry	Charles Andler (1866–1933)
27	Alf Larsen (1885–1967)	Norway	poetry, essays	Alexander Seippel (1851–1938)
28	Thomas Mann (1875–1955)	Germany	novel, short story, drama, essays	Anders Österling (1884–1981)
29	Armando Palacio Valdés (1853–1938)	Spain	novel, short story, essays	Royal Spanish Academy (Note: Armando Palacio Valdés was nominated by approximately 20 members of the Royal Spanish Academy, and also by a number of professors at Spanish universities.)
30	Kostis Palamas (1859–1943)	Greece	poetry, essays	Verner von Heidenstam (1859–1940)
31	J.-H. Rosny aîné (1856–1940)	France	novel, short story	Romain Rolland (1866–1944); members of Le Comité Rosny (Note: Some members of Le Comité Rosny were eligible to make a nomination.)
32	Felix Timmermans (1886–1947)	Belgium	drama, novel, short story, poetry	Arthur Boon (1883–1938)
33	Sigrid Undset (1882–1949)	Norway	novel, memoir, essays	Helga Eng (1875–1966)
34	Frederik van Eeden (1860–1932)	Netherlands	novel, essays	Gerard Brom (1882–1959)
35	Edith Wharton (1862–1937)	United States	novel, short story, poetry, essays	William Lyon Phelps (1865–1943)
36	Juan Zorrilla de San Martín (1855–1931)	Uruguay	poetry	members of the Academy of Lima and the Academy of Panama

== Prize decision ==
The main contenders for the 1928 Nobel Prize in Literature were Thomas Mann, the Russian author Maxim Gorky and Sigrid Undset. The members of the Nobel committee were divided between the candidates. Committee chairman Per Hallström pushed for a prize to Thomas Mann, but failed to gain support for the proposal. Committee member Anders Österling supported Gorky's candidacy, while other committee members dismissed Gorky for his "raw" and "brutal" writing. Member Henrik Schück was negative towards all three candidates for estetical reasons. Ultimately Undset was the chosen winner, mainly because of the Nobel committee's appreciation of her novel trilogy Kristin Lavransdatter. Thomas Mann was subsequently awarded the 1929 Nobel Prize in Literature.

== Award ceremony ==
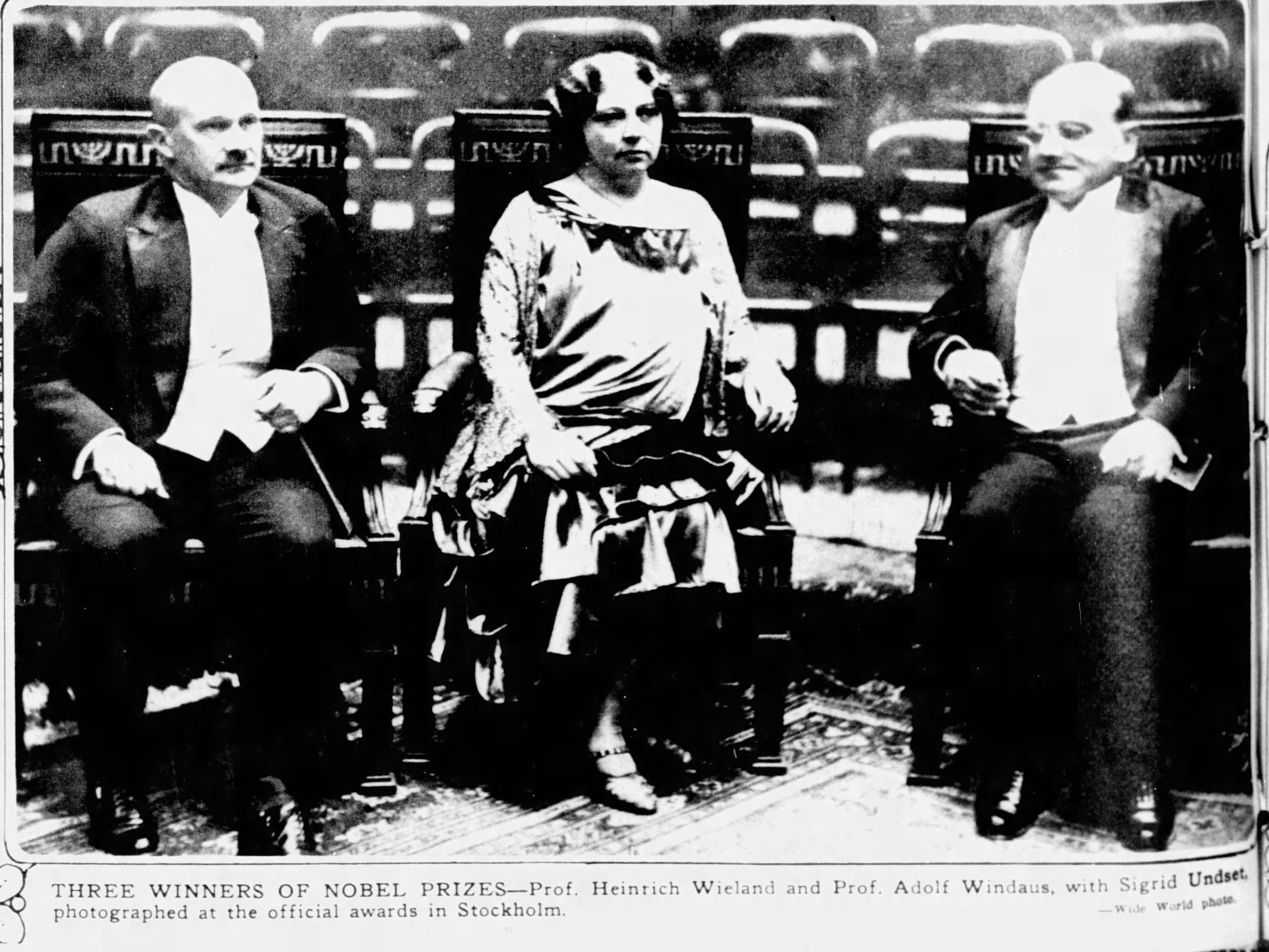
Sigrid Undset at the Nobel prize award ceremony on 10 December 1928.

At the award ceremony in Stockholm on 10 December 1928, Per Hallström of the Swedish Academy said:

Sigrid Undset has received the Nobel Prize in Literature while still in her prime, an homage rendered to a poetic genius whose roots must be in a great and well-ordered spirit.
