= 1927 Nobel Prize in Literature =

Award

- Henri Bergson
- "in recognition of his rich and vitalizing ideas and the brilliant skill with which they have been presented."
- Date: 10 November 1927 (Note: The Swedish Academy decided on 10th November 1927 that the 1926 Nobel Prize in Literature should be awarded to Grazia Deledda and that the current year's Nobel Prize in Literature should be reserved for the following year.) (postponement); 13 November 1928 (announcement); 10 December 1928 (ceremony)
- Location: Stockholm, Sweden
- Presented by: Swedish Academy
- First award: 1901
- Website: Official website

The 1927 Nobel Prize in Literature was awarded to the French philosopher Henri Bergson (1859–1941) "in recognition of his rich and vitalizing ideas and the brilliant skill with which they have been presented." He was the second philosopher to gain the Nobel Prize after Rudolf Christoph Eucken won in 1908.

== Laureate ==
Bergson was educated at the Lycée Condorcet and at the École Normale Supérieure, where he studied philosophy. He developed his philosophy through a series of publications that were well known for their original perspectives on life as well as their effective application of metaphor, imagery, and analogy. In Essai sur les Données Immédiates de la Conscience ("Time and Free Will: An Essay on the Immediate Data of Consciousness", 1889), Bergson proposed the idea that consciousness exists on two levels, the first of which can only be attained by intense introspection, and the second of which is an exterior projection of the first. The notion of time that Bergson had previously proposed in his prior writings was expanded upon and used to investigate living things in L'Évolution Créatrice ("Creative Evolution", 1907). His other principal works include Matière et Mémoire ("Matter and Memory", 1896), Le Rire. Essai sur la Signification du Comique ("Laughter: An Essay on the Meaning of the Comic", 1900) and Les Deux Sources de la Morale et de la Religion ("The Two Sources of Morality and Religion", 1932).

== Deliberations ==
=== Nominations ===
Bergson was not nominated in 1927 but in 1928 was awarded for this year. He received a total of ten nominations beginning in 1912 made Scottish author Andrew Lang. In 1928, he received three separate recommendations from members of the French Academy, members of the Academy of Political and Moral Sciences and professors of history of philosophy.

In total, the Nobel Committee received 29 nominations in 1927 for authors such as Kostis Palamas, Hugo von Hofmannsthal, Thomas Hardy, Guglielmo Ferrero, Rudolf Maria Holzapfel, Olav Duun, Ada Negri and Johannes V. Jensen (awarded in 1944). There were six authors newly nominated namely Cesare Pascarella, Eduard Meyer, Samuel Parsons Scott, Edith Wharton, Édouard Estaunié and Erwin Guido Kolbenheyer. Of the 21 nominees, four were women: Ada Negri, Edith Wharton, Concha Espina de la Serna and Grazia Deledda (awarded for 1926).

The authors Ryūnosuke Akutagawa, Bernhard Alexander, Mikhail Artsybashev, Hugo Ball, Kazimir Barantsevich, Margret Holmes Bates, Martin Stanislaus Brennan, Clara Louise Burnham, John Bagnell Bury, Mabel Collins, Roi Cooper Megrue, James Oliver Curwood, Minnie S. Davis, Robert de Flers, Federico De Roberto, Manuel Díaz Rodríguez, Osório Duque-Estrada, Georges Eekhoud, Adolfo León Gómez, Ricardo Güiraldes, Lesbia Harford, Hubert Harrison, Fukuda Hideko, Jerome K. Jerome, Kang Youwei, Gaston Leroux, Agnes Maule Machar, Harriet Earhart Monroe, Süleyman Nazif, Jessie Penn-Lewis, Stanisław Przybyszewski, Fyodor Sologub, Borisav Stanković, Stephan G. Stephansson, Mary Webb, Philip Wicksteed died in 1927 without having been nominated for the prize.

Official list of nominees and their nominators for the prize
No.	Nominee	Country	Genre(s)	Nominator(s)
1	Olaf Bull (1883–1933)	Norway	poetry	Jens Thiis (1870–1942)
2	Grazia Deledda (1871–1936)	Italy	novel, short story, essays	Henrik Schück (1855–1947)
3	Olav Duun (1876–1939)	Norway	novel, short story	Halvdan Koht (1873–1965)
4	Concha Espina de la Serna (1869–1955)	Spain	novel, short story	Salomon Leopold Rosenberg (1869–1934)
5	Paul Ernst (1866–1933)	Germany	novel, short story, drama, essays	German professors (Note: A number of German professors, some of whom, based on the subjects they represented, were eligible to nominate P. Ernst.)
6	Édouard Estaunié (1862–1942)	France	novel, literary criticism	Erik Staaff (1867–1936)
7	Guglielmo Ferrero (1871–1942)	Italy	history, essays, novel	Georg Wittrock (1876–1957); Gaetano Mosca (1858–1941)
8	Vilhelm Grønbech (1873–1948)	Denmark	history, essays, poetry	Johannes Pedersen (1883–1977)
9	Thomas Hardy (1840–1928)	United Kingdom	novel, short story, poetry, drama	Aage Brusendorff (1887–1932); Robert Eugen Zachrisson (1880–1937)
10	Ferenc Herczeg (1863–1954)	Hungary	novel, drama, essays	Hungarian Academy of Sciences
11	Rudolf Maria Holzapfel (1874–1930)	Austria	philosophy, essays	Romain Rolland (1866–1944); Several professors (Note: A number of North American, Swiss and German professors and authors, some of whom were eligible to make a nomination, joined in the nomination for Holzapfel.)
12	Erwin Guido Kolbenheyer (1878–1962)	Austria	novel, short story, poetry, drama	Austrian professors (Note: E. Kolbenheyer was nominated by professors of aesthetics and history from Vienna, Austria and Tübingen, Germany.)
13	Josip Kosor (1879–1961)	Yugoslavia (Croatia)	novel, poetry, drama	Branislav Petronijević (1875–1954)
14	Eduard Meyer (1855–1930)	Germany	history	Georg Wittrock (1876–1957)
15	Ada Negri (1870–1945)	Italy	poetry, novel, essays	Vittorio Rossi (1865–1938); Giuseppe Gallavresi (1879–1937); Giuseppe Antonio Borgese (1882–1952); Michele Scherillo (1860–1930)
16	Kostis Palamas (1859–1943)	Greece	poetry, essays	Simos Menardos (1872–1933) (Note: The nomination was supported by Anders Österling. The Nobel Prize in Literature for 1926 was reserved. This nomination, originally made in 1926, was carried over to the nominations for 1927.)
17	Cesare Pascarella (1858–1940)	Italy	poetry, essays	Pompeo Gherardo Molmenti (1852–1928); Paolo Boselli (1838–1932); Giovanni Gentile (1875–1944)
18	Samuel Parsons Scott (Note: Scott: "History of the Moorish Empire in Europe" (1904).) (1846–1929)	United States	essays, history, law	Edgar Ewing Brandon (1865–1957)
19	Hugo von Hofmannsthal (1874–1929)	Austria	novel, poetry, drama, essays	Walther Brecht (1876–1950)
20	Edvard Westermarck (1862–1939)	Finland	philosophy, essays	8 members of the Finnish Scientific Society
21	Edith Wharton (1862–1937)	United States	novel, short story, poetry, essays	7 professors at the Yale University

=== Prize decision ===
In November 1927, the Swedish Academy announced that the postponed prize for 1926 was awarded to the Italian writer Grazia Deledda, but that no Nobel Prize in Literature for the year 1927 would be awarded with the following explanation:

"During the selection process, the Nobel Committee for Literature decided that none of the year's nominations met the criteria as outlined in Alfred Nobel's will. According to the Nobel Foundation's statutes, the Nobel Prize can in such a case be reserved until the following year, and this statute was then applied."

During the deliberations for the 1927 prize, the Nobel committee considered the Greek poet Kostis Palamas, but his candidacy was hindered as the committee members were not able to read his poetry in the original language. Hugo von Hofmannsthal were also considered, but the committee found his works too uneven to find support for a recommendation. The committee found recent works by Danish author Johannes V. Jensen to be "overwhelmingly attractive", but the committee had "not found their merits to outweigh the offensive and hurtful features of his earlier production, otherwise remarkable for its imaginative power and immediacy. Should the continued development correspond to the promises that have been made recently, the Committers would be happy to change their position hitherto taken." Johannes V. Jensen was subsequently awarded the 1944 Nobel Prize in Literature.

On 13 November 1928, the Swedish Academy decided that the Nobel Prize for 1927 should be awarded to Henri Bergson "in recognition of his rich and vitalizing ideas and the brilliant skill with which they have been presented", and Sigrid Undset the prize for 1928. Bergson's candidacy had previously, and also in 1928, been dismissed as the committee found it difficult to properly evaluate his work in a field of literature where few other writers were nominated, and their reluctance to recommend non-fiction writers.
