= 1924 Nobel Prize in Literature =

- Wladyslaw Reymont
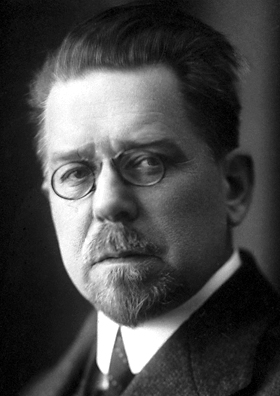
- "for his great national epic, The Peasants"
- Date: 13 November 1924 (announcement); 10 December 1924 (ceremony)
- Location: Stockholm, Sweden
- Presented by: Swedish Academy
- First award: 1901
- Website: Official website

The 1924 Nobel Prize in Literature was awarded to the Polish author Wladyslaw Reymont (1867–1925) "for his great national epic, The Peasants". He was the second Polish recipient of the literature prize after Henryk Sienkiewicz.

== Laureate ==
Wladyslaw Stanislaw Reymont (1867–1925) wrote novels and short stories that was strongly influenced by naturalism. He is best known for Chłopi ("The Peasants", 1904–1909), a novel in four volumes that chronicles peasant life in Poland during the four seasons of the year, for which he specifically was awarded the Nobel prize. An earlier success was the novel Ziemia obiecana ("The Promised Land", 1899), which tells the story of three close friends and ruthless young industrialists: a Pole, a German and a Jew, struggling to build their own factory in the heartless world of the late 19th century labor exploitation. His other well known works include Pielgrzymka do Jasnej Góry ("A Pilgrimage to Jasna Góra", 1895) and Bunt ("The Revolt", 1924)

== Nominations ==
Wladislaw Reymont was first nominated in 1919 by the Polish Academy of Arts and Sciences. It was followed in 1920, 1922 and 1924 wherein he was recommended by Nobel Committee members. In total, the committee received 22 nominations for 18 authors which included Hugo von Hofmannsthal, Guglielmo Ferrero (who earned the three nominations - the highest), Thomas Hardy, Paul Ernst, Stefan Żeromski, Roberto Bracco, Paul Sabatier, George Bernard Shaw (awarded in 1925), . Three of the nominees were newly nominated: Thomas Mann (awarded in 1929), Max Neuburger and Olav Duun. There were two female nominees namely the Italian novelists Grazia Deledda (awarded in 1926) and Matilde Serao.

The authors Marie-Louise-Félicité Angers (known as Laure Conan), Valery Bryusov, Frances Hodgson Burnett, Joseph Conrad, Jacob Israël de Haan, Herman Heijermans, Franz Kafka, Arnold H. S. Landor, Laura Jean Libbey, Lin Shu, Mary Mackay (known as Marie Corelli), Paul Milliet, Edith Nesbit and Gene Stratton-Porter died in 1924 without having been nominated.

Official list of nominees and their nominators for the prize
No.	Nominee	Country	Genre(s)	Nominator(s)
1	Roberto Bracco (1861–1943)	Italy	drama, screenplay	Kristoffer Nyrop (1858–1931); Haakon Shetelig (1877–1955)
2	Grazia Deledda (1871–1936)	Italy	novel, short story, essays	Carl Bildt (1850–1931)
3	Olav Duun (1876–1939)	Norway	novel, short story	Oscar Albert Johnsen (1876–1954)
4	Paul Ernst (1866–1933)	Germany	novel, short story, drama, essays	Professors (Note: Paul Ernst was nominated by professors from Munich, Berlin, Chemnitz and Bonn in Germany, as well as Zürich, Switzerland, and Budapest, Hungary.)
5	Guglielmo Ferrero (1871–1942)	Italy	history, essays, novel	Professors in Geneva; Professors in Neuchâtel; Gaetano Mosca (1858–1941); Gaetano Salvemini (1873–1957); Niccolò Rodolico (1873–1969); Antonio de Viti de Marco (1858–1943)
6	Thomas Hardy (1840–1928)	United Kingdom	novel, short story, poetry, drama	Robert Eugen Zachrisson (1880–1937)
7	Arno Holz (1863–1929)	Germany	poetry, drama, essays	Eugen Wolf (1850–1912)
8	Einar Hjörleifsson Kvaran (1859–1938)	Iceland	novel, poetry, drama, essays	Valtýr Guðmundsson (1860–1928)
9	Thomas Mann (1875–1955)	Germany	novel, short story, drama, essays	Gerhart Hauptmann (1862–1946)
10	Max Neuburger (1868–1955)	Austria	history, essays	Adolf Fonahn (1873–1940)
11	Władysław Reymont (1867–1925)	Poland	novel, short story	Anders Österling (1884–1981)
12	Paul Sabatier (1858–1928)	France	history, theology, biography	Carl Bildt (1850–1931)
13	Matilde Serao (1856–1927)	Italy	novel, essays	Francesco Torraca (1853–1938)
14	George Bernard Shaw (1856–1950)	Ireland	drama, essays, novel	Tor Hedberg (1862–1931)
15	Hermann Türck (1856–1933)	Germany	essays, biography	Rudolf Unger (1876–1942); Wolfgang Golther (1863–1945)
16	Hugo von Hofmannsthal (1874–1929)	Austria	novel, poetry, drama, essays	Walther Brecht (1876–1950)
17	Ludwig von Pastor (1854–1928)	Germany	history	Olof Kolsrud (1885–1945)
18	Stefan Żeromski (1864–1925)	Poland	novel, drama, short story	Richard Ekblom (1874–1959)

== Prize decicion ==
In their report to the Swedish Academy dated 1 September 1924, the Nobel committee proposed that the Nobel Prize for 1924 should be awarded to Polish author Wladislaw Reymont for his novel The Peasants, noting that "Reymont's The Peasants is a book of power and richness that is quite rare in all of recent novel literature, a true prose epic that not only has a high degree of national typicality, but through a large and simple presentation in verse of the living and to some extent soulful earth and the earth's closest children, it reaches traits typical of an entire class of people, and indeed of general human interest."

Committee member Henrik Schück did not agree with the majority of the committee and advocated a prize to the Sardinian-Italian author Grazia Deledda (subsequently awarded the 1926 Nobel Prize in Literature), arguing "I certainly do not want to insist on the provision in Nobel's will that the prize-winning work should be "the most excellent in an ideal direction". By emphasizing this too much, one would certainly exclude many of the most excellent works of world literature. But if one has to choose between two, both of which are, in their own way, of excellent merit, one cannot fail to take into account the donor's purpose. He intended works of literature that would make the reader stronger, happier, more prepared for the work in the service of humanity that he wanted to promote. I have always experienced such a feeling after reading Deledda's novels. But after studying Reymont's I have rather felt depressed, despite all recognition of the author's great talent."

On 13 November 1924, the Swedish Academy decided that that year's Nobel Prize in Literature should be awarded to Wladyslaw Reymont "for his great national epic, The Peasants".

== Presentation ==
As no official award ceremony took place, Per Hallström, chairman of the Nobel committee of the Swedish Academy, wrote a critical essay on Reymont in lieu of a presentation speech. In it he concluded:

To sum up, this epic novel is characterized by an art so grand, so sure, so powerful, that we may predict a lasting value and rank for it, not only within Polish literature but also within the whole of that branch of imaginative writing which has here been given a distinctive and monumental shape.
