= 1929 Nobel Prize in Literature =

Award

- Thomas Mann
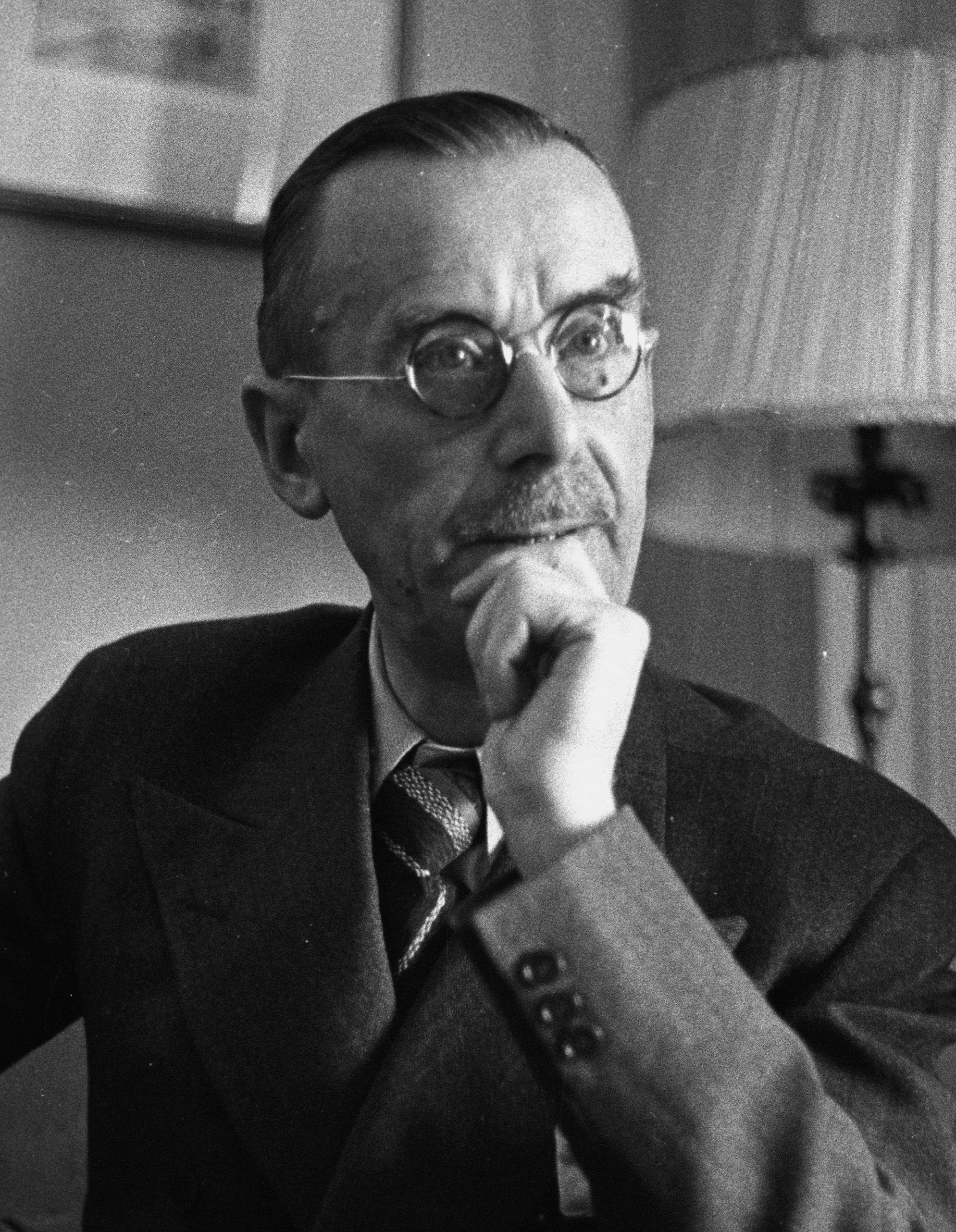
- "principally for his great novel, Buddenbrooks, which has won steadily increased recognition as one of the classic works of contemporary literature."
- Date: 12 November 1929 (announcement); 10 December 1929 (ceremony)
- Location: Stockholm, Sweden
- Presented by: Swedish Academy
- First award: 1901
- Website: Official website

The 1929 Nobel Prize in Literature was awarded to the German author Thomas Mann (1875–1955) "principally for his great novel, Buddenbrooks, which has won steadily increased recognition as one of the classic works of contemporary literature." He is the fourth German author to be awarded the literature prize after Paul von Heyse in 1910.

== Laureate ==
Thomas Mann was a prolific writer of fiction and novels who wrote in a variety of genres. He was a merchant's son and was supposed to inherit the family's grain business in Lübeck, but like his older brother Heinrich, he decided to focus on literature. In 1905, he married Katia Pringsheim, and the couple had six children, four of whom also became significant authors (Erika, Klaus, and Golo). His highly symbolic and ironic epic novels and novellas are noted for their insight into the psychology of the artist and the intellectual. His analysis and critique of the European and German soul used modernized versions of German and Biblical stories, as well as the ideas of Goethe, Nietzsche, and Schopenhauer. His best known oeuvres include Der Tod in Venedig ("Death in Venice", 1912), Der Zauberberg ("The Magic Mountain", 1924), Joseph und seine Brüder ("Joseph and His Brothers", 1933–1943), and Doktor Faustus ("Dr. Faustus", 1947).

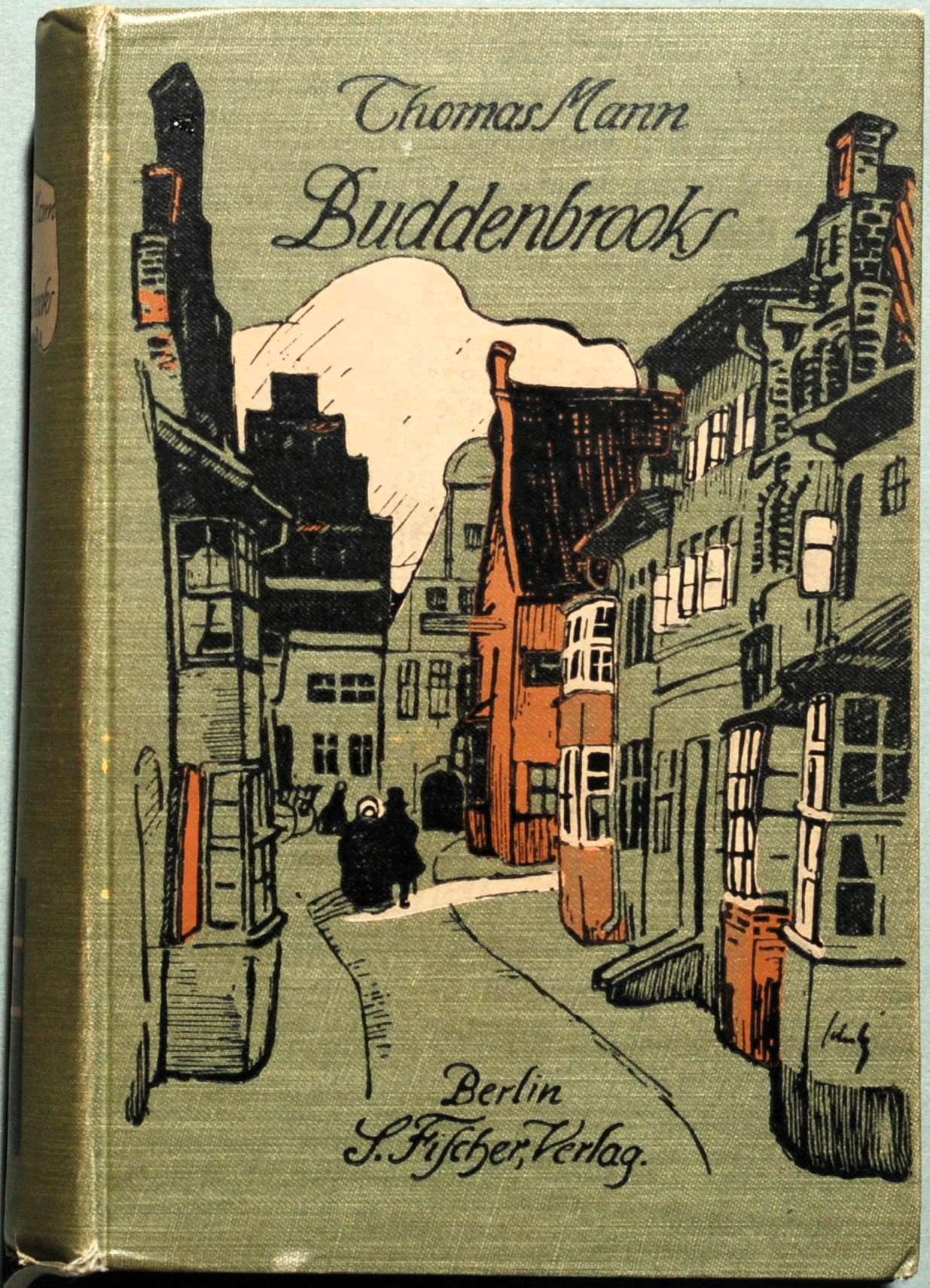
Mann's Buddenbrooks published in 1901.

=== Buddenbrooks ===
Mann won the Nobel Prize primarily because of his breakthrough 1901 novel Buddenbrooks, which chronicles the decline of a wealthy north German merchant family over the course of four generations, incidentally portraying the manner of life and mores of the Hanseatic bourgeoisie in the years from 1835 to 1877. The novel was subtitled "a family's decline [Verfall einer Familie]" in its original language. Although the Nobel award generally recognizes an author's body of work, the Swedish Academy identified it as the principal reason for his prize. The rationale could also be seen as a reference to one of Mann's later works, The Magic Mountain, a coming-of-age story and, together with Buddenbrooks, his most well-known composition.

== Nominations ==
Thomas Mann was only nominated thrice before he was finally awarded in 1929. He was first nominated in 1924 by the 1912 Nobel Prize laureate Gerhart Hauptmann. His 1929 nomination came from the Nobel Committee member Anders Österling (1884–1981). In 1948, Mann was unconventionally nominated again by two Swedish Academy members (H. Gullberg and E. Löfstedt), but his nomination was not considered during the deliberation process due to the reason that he was already a Nobel laureate.

The Swedish Academy received 30 nominations for 24 authors among them Erik Axel Karlfeldt, Kostis Palamas, Johan Bojer, Édouard Estaunié, and Arno Holz. Six of the nominees were first-time nominated namely Stefan George, Edwin Arlington Robinson, Thorton Wilder, Cale Young Rice, Benedetto Croce, and Knud Rasmussen. The Spanish writer Concha Espina de la Serna was the only female nominee.

The authors Olav Aukrust, Katharine Lee Bates, Barbara Baynton, Maurice Bouchor, Bliss Carman, Edward Carpenter, Lucy Clifford, Georges Courteline, Anna Bowman Dodd, Ellen Thorneycroft Fowler, Albert Giraud, Shtjefën Gjeçovi, Alice Stopford Green, Max Lehmann, Liang Qichao, Mary Elizabeth Mann, John Morris-Jones, Jānis Pliekšāns (known as Rainis), Hans Prutz, Grace Rhys, Dallas Lore Sharp, Flora Annie Steel, Vedam Venkataraya Sastry died in 1929 without having been nominated for the prize.

Official list of nominees and their nominators for the prize
No.	Nominee	Country	Genre(s)	Nominator(s) (Note: The asterisks (*) denote nominations that were received after the deadline for 1928 and was moved to 1929.)
1	Rudolf Hans Bartsch (1873–1952)	Austria	novel, short story, essays, drama	Hugo Spitzer (1854–1937)
2	Rufino Blanco Fombona (1874–1844)	Venezuela	essays, literary criticism	Fidelino de Figueiredo (1888–1967)
3	Johan Bojer (1872–1959)	Norway	novel, drama	Thomas Johannes Parr (1862–1935)*; Nathan Söderblom (1866–1931)*
4	Georg Bonne (1859–1945)	Germany	essays	Edmund Hildebrandt (1872–1939); Karl Heldmann (1869–1943)
5	Otokar Březina (1868–1929)	Czechoslovakia	poetry, essays	27 professors (Note: Otokar Březina was nominated by 27 professors from Prague, Brünn (Brno) and Pressburg (now Bratislava), all in former Czechoslovakia.)
6	Benedetto Croce (1866–1952)	Italy	history, philosophy, law	Friedrich Meinecke (1862–1954); Karl Vossler (1872–1949); Julius von Schlosser (1866–1938)
7	Paul Ernst (1866–1933)	Germany	novel, short story, drama, essays	13 professors from Germany, Austria and Switzerland
8	Concha Espina de la Serna (1869–1955)	Spain	novel, short story	numerous professors (Note: Concha Espina's nomination came from Barcelona, Granada, Santiago de Compostela, Valencia and Bordeaux, among others, in 13 separate letters.); Fredrik Wulff (1845–1930) (Note: E. Walberg, professor at Lund, corroborated Fredrik Wulff's nomination of Concha Espina.)
9	Édouard Estaunié (1862–1942)	France	novel, essays	Erik Staaff (1867–1936)
10	Stefan George (1868–1933)	Germany	poetry, translation	Ernst Bertram (1884–1957)*
11	Bertel Gripenberg (1878–1947)	Finland; Sweden	poetry, drama, essays	Nathan Söderblom (1866–1931)*
12	Ivan Grozev (1872–1957)	Bulgaria	drama, poetry, literary criticism	Mikhail Arnaudov (1878–1978)*
13	Arno Holz (1863–1929)	Germany	poetry, drama	412 professors and teachers (Note: A. Holz was nominated by 412 professors and other teachers at German, Austrian, Swiss and other universities and colleges. The nominations were sent by the Faculty of Philosophy at the university in Königsberg, Germany)
14	Rudolf Maria Holzapfel (1874–1930)	Austria	philosophy, essays	3 members of the Prussian Academy of Arts
15	William Ralph Inge (1860–1954)	United Kingdom	theology, essays	Nathan Söderblom (1866–1931)
16	Erik Axel Karlfeldt (1884–1931)	Sweden	poetry	Ivar Alnæs (1868–1956) (Note: Erik Axel Karlfeldt was nominated by D. Seip and I. Alnaes, both members of the Norwegian Academy of Science and Letters.); Didrik Arup Seip (1884–1963)
17	Thomas Mann (1875–1955)	Germany	novel, short story, drama, essays	Anders Österling (1884–1981)
18	Kostis Palamas (1859–1943)	Greece	poetry, essays	Frederik Poulsen (1876–1950)
19	Knud Rasmussen (1897–1933)	Denmark	short story, memoir, essays	William Thalbitzer (1873–1958)
20	Cale Young Rice (1872–1943)	United States	poetry, drama	Edward Franklin Farquhar (1883–1960)*
21	Edwin Arlington Robinson (1869–1935)	United States	poetry, drama	Hjalmar Hammarskjöld (1862–1953)
22	Henrik Schück (1855–1947)	Sweden	literary criticism, essays	Ulrik Anton Motzfeldt (1871–1942)
23	Ludwig von Pastor (1854–1928)	Germany	history	Olof Kolsrud (1885–1945)*
24	Thornton Wilder (1897–1975)	United States	drama, novel, short story	Anders Österling (1884–1981)

=== Prize decision ===
In 1924, when Thomas Mann was first nominated for the prize, the Nobel committee were divided. His candidacy was supported by committee chairman Per Hallström and Anders Österling, while other members had doubts to award Mann. It was decided to await his next work for further deliberations. Following the publication of the novel The Magic Mountain, Mann was nominated again by Österling in 1928, but the Nobel committee concluded that the novel (later widely regarded as Mann's masterpiece) was not as strong as his earlier works. Per Hallström in particular pushed for a prize to Mann, and the following year the committee agreed on that Thomas Mann should be awarded the prize, primarily for the novel Buddenbrooks. The Swedish Academy followed the recommendation and voted for a prize to Mann.

=== Prize announcement ===
The prize decision for 1929 was officially announced by the Swedish Academy on 12 November that year, but according to the New York Times Thomas Mann's name hade been disclosed as the recipient of the award already in mid-September. Other writers speculated to be awarded the 1929 literature prize included British authors John Galsworthy (awarded in 1932) and G. K. Chesterton, Americans Sinclair Lewis (awarded in 1930) and Thornton Wilder, Italian Guglielmo Ferrero, Germans Erich Maria Remarque and Ricarda Huch, and Russian Maxim Gorky.
