= Hiranmoy Ghoshal =

Bengali writer, translator, diplomat and linguist

- Born: August 7, 1908; Calcutta, Bengal, British India (now Kolkata, West Bengal, India)
- Died: September 24, 1969; Warsaw, Poland
- Education: University of Calcutta (BA)
- Occupations: writer, lecturer and diplomat
- Known for: writer, diplomat, translator and linguist
- Movement: Indian independence movement
- Children: 2

Hiranmoy Ghoshal is a Bengali writer, diplomat, translator and linguist from West Bengal, India. He was a lecturer at the University of Warsaw. Ghoshal was a multilingual person who was able to speak 26 languages. He spied for Netaji Subhas Chandra Bose.

== Early life and education ==
He was born on 7 August 1908 in Calcutta (now Kolkata). In 1929, Ghoshal graduated from University of Calcutta with a degree in Philosophy and Romance Studies. He then went England to study law. In 1934, he moved to Poland, where he began working as a lecturer and foreign language teacher at the University of Warsaw. In 1940, he and his fiancé were able to leave Poland for India. During stay in India, he wrote and published memoirs from the September Expedition and his life in occupied Poland. He has been working in the Bombay (now Mumbai) office of the Ministry of Labor and Social Welfare since 1943, where he worked on the issue of Polish refugees.

== Literary career ==
Ghoshal has written nine books in Bengali, two books in English, and numerous short stories, articles and reviews. He has translated many classic works of Polish literature into Bengali, including Henryk Sienkiewicz's Quo Vadis, Władysław Reymont's The Peasants and Bolesław Prus's novel.

== Personal life ==
He married Halina Nowierska. In 1958, a few years after the death of his first wife, he married Halina Kosinkiewicz.

== Death ==
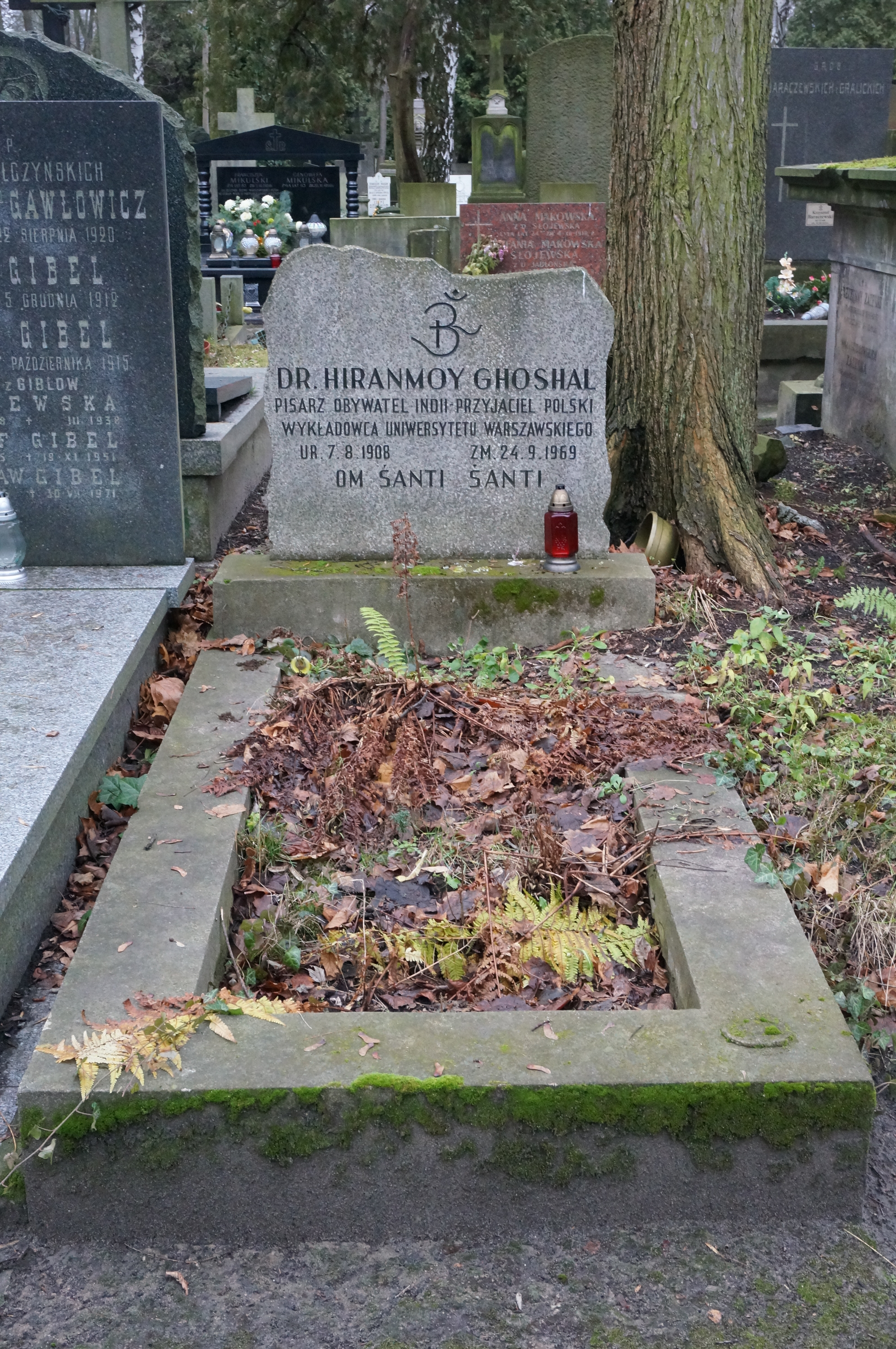
Hiranmoy Ghoshal's grave

He died on 24 September 1969 in Warsaw, Poland. He was buried in Powązki Cemetery. Her daughter recalls that Ghoshal "was under a lot of stress because he was pushed out of the diplomatic service, and he could not digest that insult for the rest of his life."

== Bibliography ==
- Hiranmoy Ghoshal, Księga Walhalli, Wydawnictwo MON, Warszawa 1971.
