= Edith Howes =

NZ teacher, writer, educationalist

Edith Howes MBE
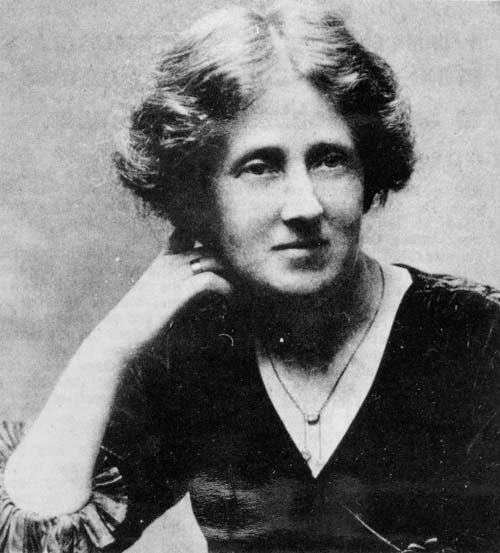
- in the 1900s
- Born: Edith Annie Howes; 29 August 1872; London, England
- Died: 9 July 1954 (aged 81); Dunedin, New Zealand
- Known for: Children's books

Edith Annie Howes MBE (29 August 1872 – 9 July 1954) was a New Zealand teacher, educationalist, and writer of children's literature. She was a Member of the Order of the British Empire and received the King George VI Coronation Medal for her services to literature.

== Family and education ==
She was born in London, England, one of five children of Cecilia Brown and William Howes, a post office clerk and accountant. Her brother George became a noted entomologist.

The family emigrated to New Zealand when she was very young. She attended Kaiapoi Borough School, where she later became a pupil teacher.

== Teaching career ==
In 1893 she completed her training to become a teacher at Christchurch. She taught at several different schools including Ashburton, Wanganui, and Makarewa before becoming the infant mistress at Gore School in 1899. She eventually rose to be headmistress, remaining in that position from 1914 until 1917.

In 1917 she moved to the Wellington Girls' College, where she was the head of the junior department. She stayed in this position until 1919, when she retired from teaching.

Howe was an early advocate for the Montessori method and the philosophy behind kindergartens. She became known as an educational reformer, pushing for a less institutional learning environment featuring smaller class sizes and quieter, more comfortable classrooms. She was a feminist who believed strongly that higher education was critical for women to participate fully in civic life.

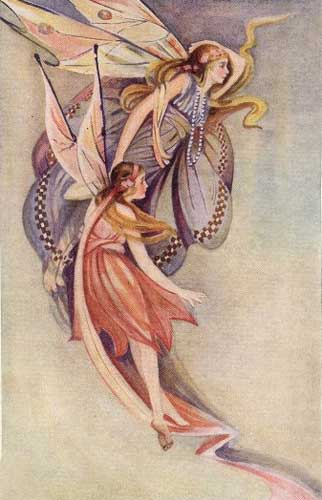
Illustration for Howe's book Wonderwings by Alice Polson

== Writings ==
A recording of "Wonderwings"

Howe began writing children's books around 1910, believing that stories and songs helped children to learn. Although she worked in the genre of fairy tales, she saw that there was not enough written material on scientific subjects available to New Zealand schoolchildren, so she made a point of incorporating scientific information and natural phenomena into her books. For example, in The Cradle Ship (1916) she offered a true account of where babies come from, making the book a minor landmark in sex education for children. She wrote some 30 books altogether, the best-known of which are Fairy Rings (1911) and The Cradle Ship, which was translated into several other languages.

Howe also wrote for adults, including books on education (Tales Out of School; The Great Experiment), plays, and an opera libretto. Her play Rose Lane (1936) won a British Drama League prize.

In 1928, she was nominated for the Nobel Prize in Literature by professor of history Francis Prendeville Wilson of University of New Zealand. The Nobel Committee stated that they have "not found any reason to call for the Nobel Prize" because "the proposal concerns a small educational book for children in a fairly appealing form."

In the 1935 King's Birthday Honours, Howes was appointed a Member of the Order of the British Empire, for public services, and in 1937 she was awarded the King George VI Coronation Medal.

She moved to Dunedin in 1941 and lived there until her death on 9 July 1954.

== Publications ==
- Fairy Rings (1911)
- Where the Bell Birds Chime (1912)
- Maoriland Fairy Tales (1913)
- Stewart Island (1913)
- The Sun's Babies (1910; illustrated by Frank Watkins)
- Buttercups (1914)
- The Cradle Ship (1916; illustrated by Florence Mary Anderson)
- Tales Out of School (1919)
- The Singing Fish (1921)
- Wonderwings and Other Fairy Stories (1921; illustrated by Alice Polson)
- The Rainbow (1922)
- The Dream-Girl's Garden (1923; illustrated by Daisy Osborn)
- Tales of Maori Magic (1928)
- Silver Island (1928; illustrated by Kathleen Coales)
- Safe Going (1931)
- The Great Experiment (1932)
- The Poppy Seed: And Other Nature Stories (1943)
- Riverside Family (1944)
- Marlborough Sounds: The Waters of Restfulness
- The Long Bright Land: Fairy Tales from Southern Seas
