= List of Polish Nobel laureates =

The Nobel Prize

This is a list of Nobel laureates who are Poles (ethnic) or Polish (citizenship). The Nobel Prize is a set of annual international awards bestowed on "those who conferred the greatest benefit on humankind", first instituted in 1901. Since 1903, there have been nineteen Poles who were awarded twenty Nobel Prizes. Poles have been the recipients of all Nobel prize categories: Physics, Chemistry, Physiology or Medicine, Literature, Peace and Economics.

== Laureates ==
Year	Winner	Field	Contribution
1903	Maria Skłodowska Curie	Physics	"for their joint researches on the radiation phenomena discovered by Professor Henri Becquerel"
1905	Henryk Sienkiewicz	Literature	"because of his outstanding merits as an epic writer"
1907	Albert A. Michelson	Physics	"for his optical precision instruments and the spectroscopic and metrological investigations carried out with their aid"
1911	Maria Skłodowska Curie (2nd time)	Chemistry	"for the discovery of the elements radium and polonium, by the isolation of radium and the study of the nature and compounds of this remarkable element"
1924	Władysław Reymont	Literature	"for his great national epic, The Peasants"
1944	Isidor Isaac Rabi	Physics	"for his resonance method for recording the magnetic properties of atomic nuclei"
1950	Tadeusz Reichstein	Medicine	"for their discoveries relating to the hormones of the adrenal cortex, their structure and biological effects"
1977	Andrzej Schally	Medicine	"for their discoveries concerning the peptide hormone production of the brain"
1978	Isaac Bashevis Singer	Literature	"for his impassioned narrative art which, with roots in a Polish-Jewish cultural tradition, brings universal human conditions to life"
1978	Menachem Begin	Peace	"for jointly having negotiated peace between Egypt and Israel in 1978"
1980	Czesław Miłosz	Literature	"who with uncompromising clear-sightedness voices man's exposed condition in a world of severe conflicts"
1981	Roald Hoffmann	Chemistry	"for their theories, developed independently, concerning the course of chemical reactions"
1983	Lech Wałęsa	Peace	"founder of Solidarność; campaigner for human rights"
1992	Jerzy Charpak	Physics	"for his invention and development of particle detectors, in particular the multiwire proportional chamber"
1994	Shimon Peres	Peace	"for their efforts to create peace in the Middle East"
1995	Józef Rotblat	Peace	"for their efforts to diminish the part played by nuclear arms in international politics and, in the longer run, to eliminate such arms"
1996	Wisława Szymborska	Literature	"for poetry that with ironic precision allows the historical and biological context to come to light in fragments of human reality"
2007	Leonid Hurwicz	Economics	“for having laid the foundations of mechanism design theory”
2018	Olga Tokarczuk	Literature	“for a narrative imagination that with encyclopedic passion represents the crossing of boundaries as a form of life”
2024	Victor Ambros (obtained Polish citizenship in 2026)	Physiology or Medicine	"for the discovery of microRNA and its role in post-transcriptional gene regulation"

== Nobel laureates of Polish ancestry ==
- Irène Joliot-Curie (Physics, 1935)
- Julian Schwinger (Physics, 1965)
- Pyotr Kapitsa (Physics, 1978)
- Frank Wilczek (Physics, 2004)
- Michael Kremer (Economics, 2009)
- Jack Szostak (Physiology or Medicine, 2009)
- Robert Lefkowitz (Chemistry, 2012)
- John Hopfield (Physics, 2024)

== See also ==
- List of Nobel laureates
- List of Nobel laureates by country
- List of female Nobel laureates
