= Blanca de los Ríos =

Spanish writer and painter

The Most Excellent Blanca de los Ríos
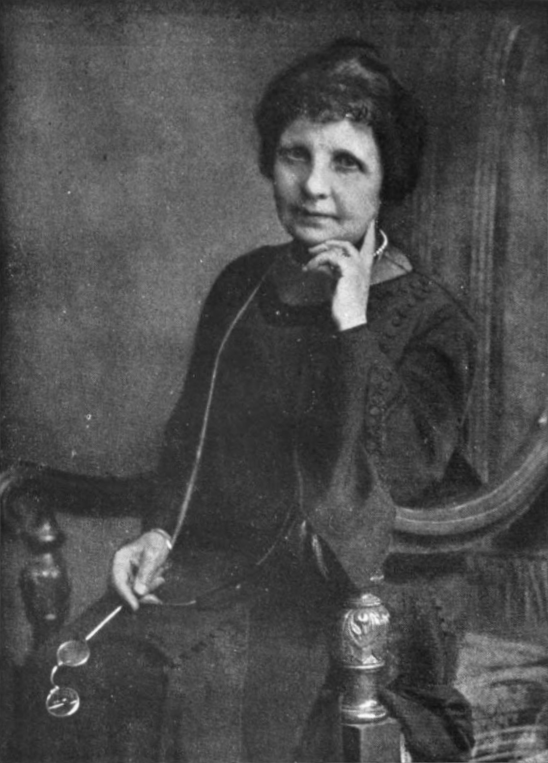
- Born: Blanca de los Ríos Nostench; 15 August 1859; Seville, Spain
- Died: 13 April 1956 (aged 96); Madrid, Spain
- Resting place: Cementerio de San Justo
- Other name: Carolina del Boss
- Occupations: Writer, painter
- Organization: Society of Friends of Portugal
- Title: Member of the Asamblea Nacional Consultiva
- Spouse: Vicente Lampérez y Romea (1892–1923)
- Father: Demetrio de los Ríos
- Awards: Grand Cross of the Order of Alfonso XII (1924); Grand Cross of Alfonso X the Wise (1949)

Blanca de los Ríos Nostench (15 August 1859 – 13 April 1956) was a Spanish writer and painter.

== Life and work ==
Blanca de los Ríos Nostench was an outstanding writer and literary critic, although she remains an obscure figure despite her intense and fruitful efforts. Her work has been translated into almost all European languages. Her birth into a cultured family brought her a broad education, as Consuelo Flecha points out in her 2000 biography of the author: "Surrounded by a family environment of writers, politicians, artists, and doctors, her education benefited from the wealth of stimuli and possibilities that this cultural context provided her with: her father, Demetrio de los Ríos, architect; her maternal grandfather, doctor; her uncles, writers like José Amador de los Ríos; and politicians, were a reference which she knew how to intelligently call on, even though she knew that, as a woman, not all roads were equally easy for her."

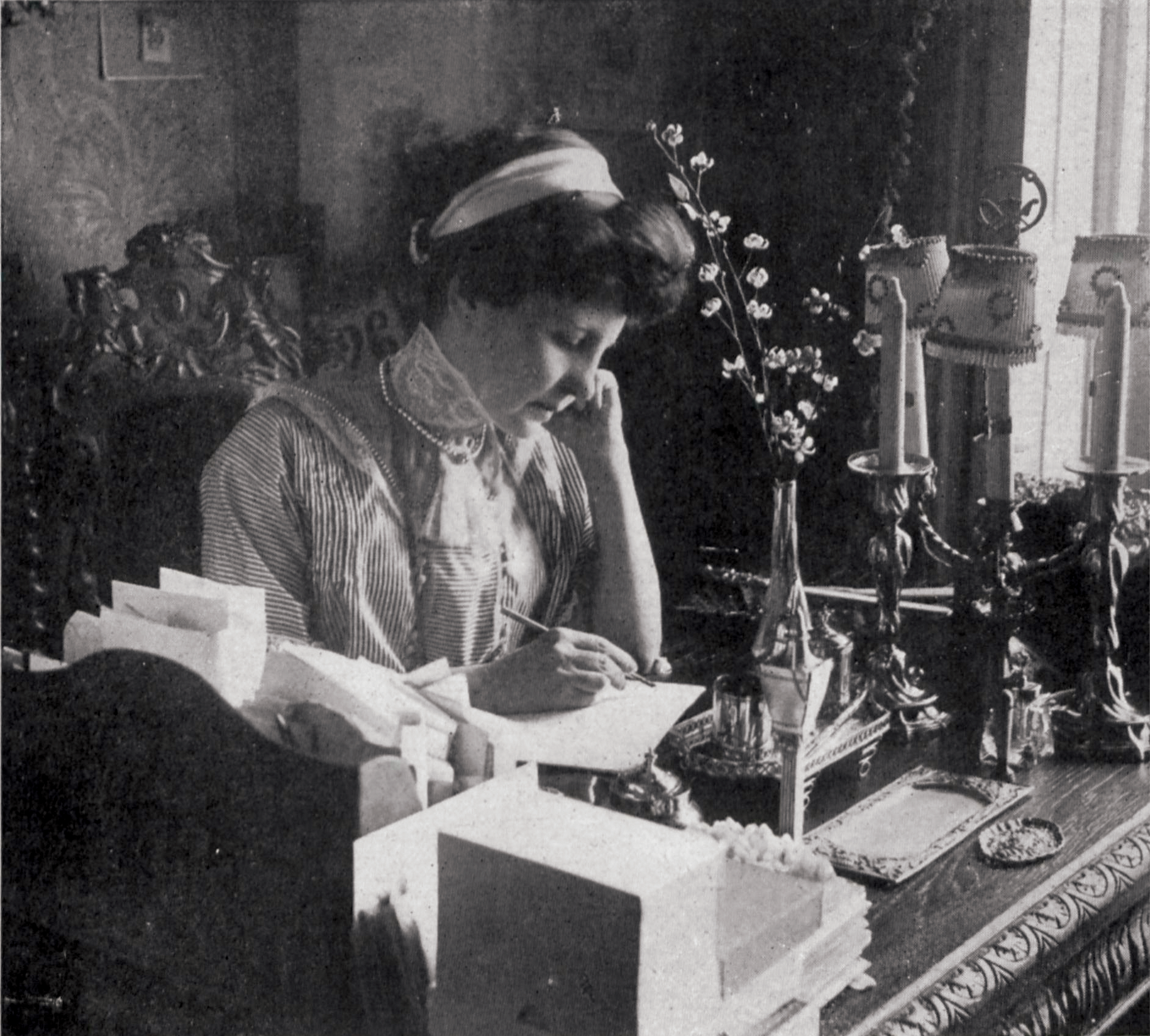
Blanca de los Ríos in Mundo Gráfico

She married Vicente Lampérez y Romea (1861–1923), a well-known architect and archaeologist from Madrid and professor at the Madrid School of Architecture who made restorations and reforms of monuments such as the cathedrals of Cuenca and Burgos, and published important studies on the history of architecture. The move to the capital granted the author direct contact with its literary and intellectual environment and extended her horizons and plans.

Perhaps because of this awareness of the difficulties of being a woman, she hid her identity in her first works for the press, which were published under the name Carolina del Boss, an anagram of her own, although she quickly abandoned this pseudonym to sign as Blanca de los Ríos. A precocious writer, her first novel Margarita was published in 1878, when she was only 16, followed by the poetry collections Los funerales del César (1880), Esperanzas y recuerdos (1881; expanded in 1912), El romancero de Don Jaime El Conquistador, and La novia del marinero (1886). A little later came her novels Melita palma (1901), Sangre española (1902), and La niña Sanabria (1907). During these years she published numerous short stories such as "Las hijas de don Juan", "Madrid goyesco", and "Los diablos azules", and story collections such as La Rondeña (Andalusian tales) and El Salvador (various stories) in 1902, and El tesoro de Sorbas in 1914.

She wrote for periodicals such as El Imparcial, La Época, Nuevo Mundo, El Correo de la Moda, Madrid Cómico, La Ilustración Española y Americana, Blanco y Negro, La Enseñanza Moderna, El Álbum Ibero-Americano, and especially Raza Española, a magazine that she founded and directed from 1918 to its closure in 1930. In this, as in other publications, she conveyed her feminist ideas.

She was a friend of Emilia Pardo Bazán, who had a very good opinion of her as a writer.

She participated as a collaborator in the writing of the Enciclopedia universal ilustrada europeo-americana.

The concern for women and relations between Spain and Latin America were always present in her thoughts, reflected by her participation in various associations and events such as the Americanist Assembly of Barcelona, the Cádiz and Madrid Centers of Hispano-American Culture, the Superior Board of Charity of Madrid, and the Union of Spanish Ladies, in which she advocated for progress in protective measures for women at work. She belonged to the Ateneo de Madrid and was part of the Asamblea Nacional Consultiva from 1927 to 1929 during the dictatorship of Miguel Primo de Rivera.

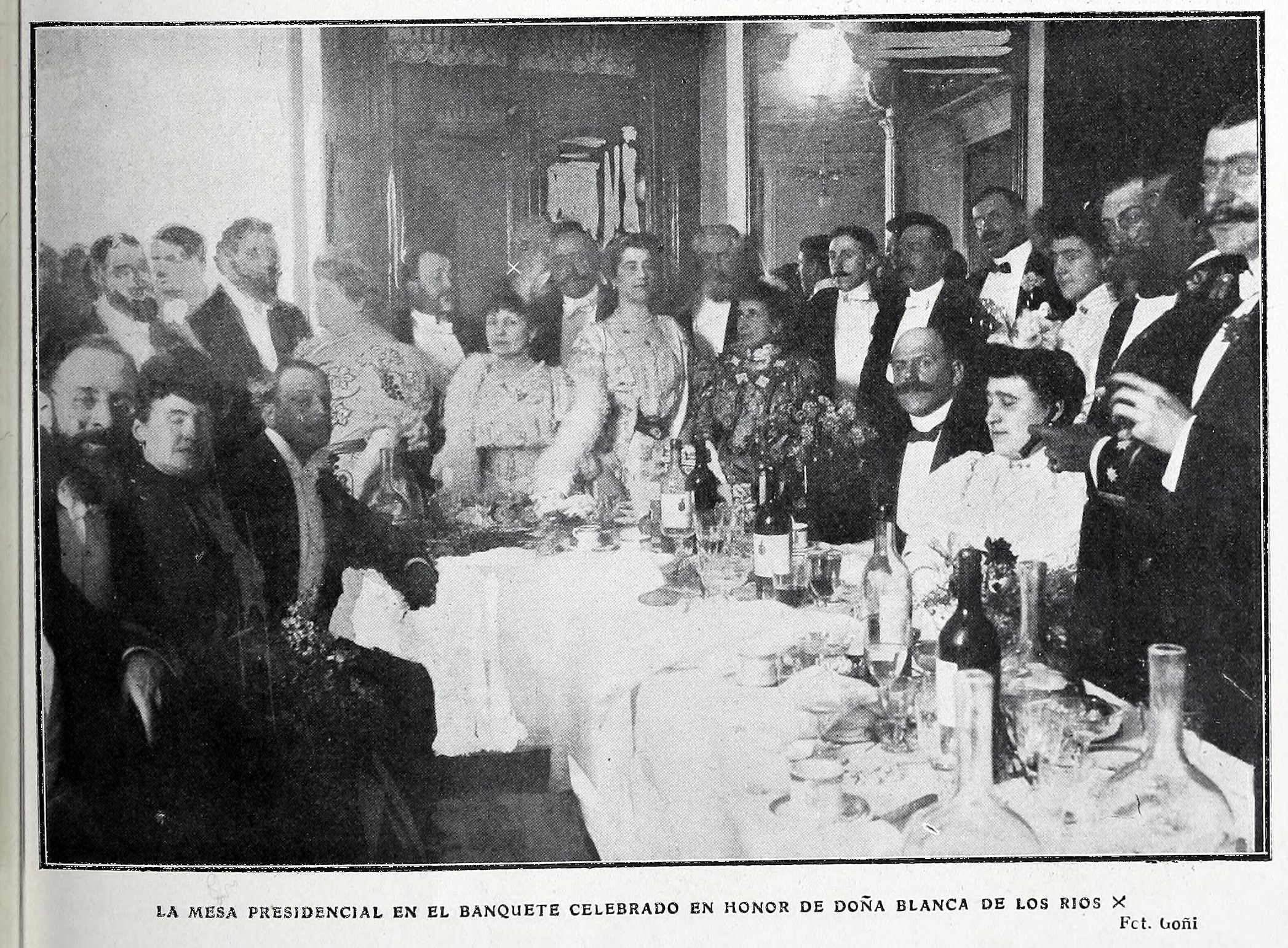
1906 banquet in honor of Blanca de los Ríos

The field in which she was most distinguished, and in which she left the greatest literary legacy, was undoubtedly the study and criticism of literature, in which she took Marcelino Menéndez y Pelayo as her teacher, following the rules of historical research and criticism that he proposed. One of her principal works is Del siglo de Oro, published in 1910, for which Menéndez Pelayo himself wrote the prologue, in which he said of her: "The illustrious lady author of this book does not need anyone to present her to the reader with informal commendations. They would always be inferior to her proven merits and to the just notoriety that she enjoys as an artist of noble lyrical and narrative ingenuity."

Blanca de los Ríos made numerous studies of Tirso de Molina, for which she is today generally blamed, at least in biographical regard, for a lack of documentary rigor. She represented Tirso as an illegitimate son of the Duke of Osuna, something that has been shown to be extremely unlikely. Her Obras completas is viewed much more favorably by critics. This work earned her recognition from the Royal Spanish Academy, which she was not part of despite having been presented as a candidate. During these studies, she discovered the baptismal certificate of Lope de Vega, which until then was believed lost in the 1790 fire of the Church of San Miguel de los Octoes. After making numerous attempts, she discovered it in a private house on Leganitos Street. Some of the church's books had been deposited there and left unharmed, among which she found, forgotten, the baptismal book of the period 1516 to 1573. Other notable texts include those that she published about Calderón de la Barca and his works La vida es sueño y los diez Segismundos de Calderón and Quijote: Sevilla, cuna del Quijote. In 1916 she published a work on Frasquita Larrea, dedicated to the analysis of the contribution of this writer and translator from Cadiz in the context of 19th-century romanticism. She also examined some literary characters with Los grandes mitos de la Edad Moderna: Don Quijote, Don Juan, Segismundo, Hamlet y Fausto. Her Del siglo de Oro also includes an extensive bibliography, in which news is given of the books that were being translated into French, Italian, German, and Danish to be disseminated in those countries.

She also devoted her efforts to the figure and work of Saint Teresa of Ávila, on which she gave various lectures: Influjo de la mística de Santa Teresa, singularmente sobre nuestro grande arte nacional (1913), Santa Teresa de Jesús y su apostolado de amor (1915), Guía espiritual de España (1915), and Ávila y Santa Teresa (1915). For this facet she has been highly praised, with descriptions such as, "As a lecturer Blanca de los Ríos is also an eminent figure by the greatness of the issues she addresses, by the elevation and originality of thought, by the richness of her inexhaustible lexicon, for the elegance of her syntax, both classical and modern, for the nobility and ornamentation of her style, and for her fervent and persuasive elocution."

She received not only the praise of critics but also numerous decorations, among them the Grand Cross of the Order of Alfonso XII (in a tribute presided over by Queen Victoria Eugenie in 1924), the Gold Medal for Merit in Labour (1931), the Grand Cross of Alfonso X the Wise (1949), Colombia's Grand Cross of Boyaca, as well as the recognition of the City of Seville, which named a street for her in 1916.
