= Rhoads Opera House fire =

1908 fire in Boyertown, Pennsylvania

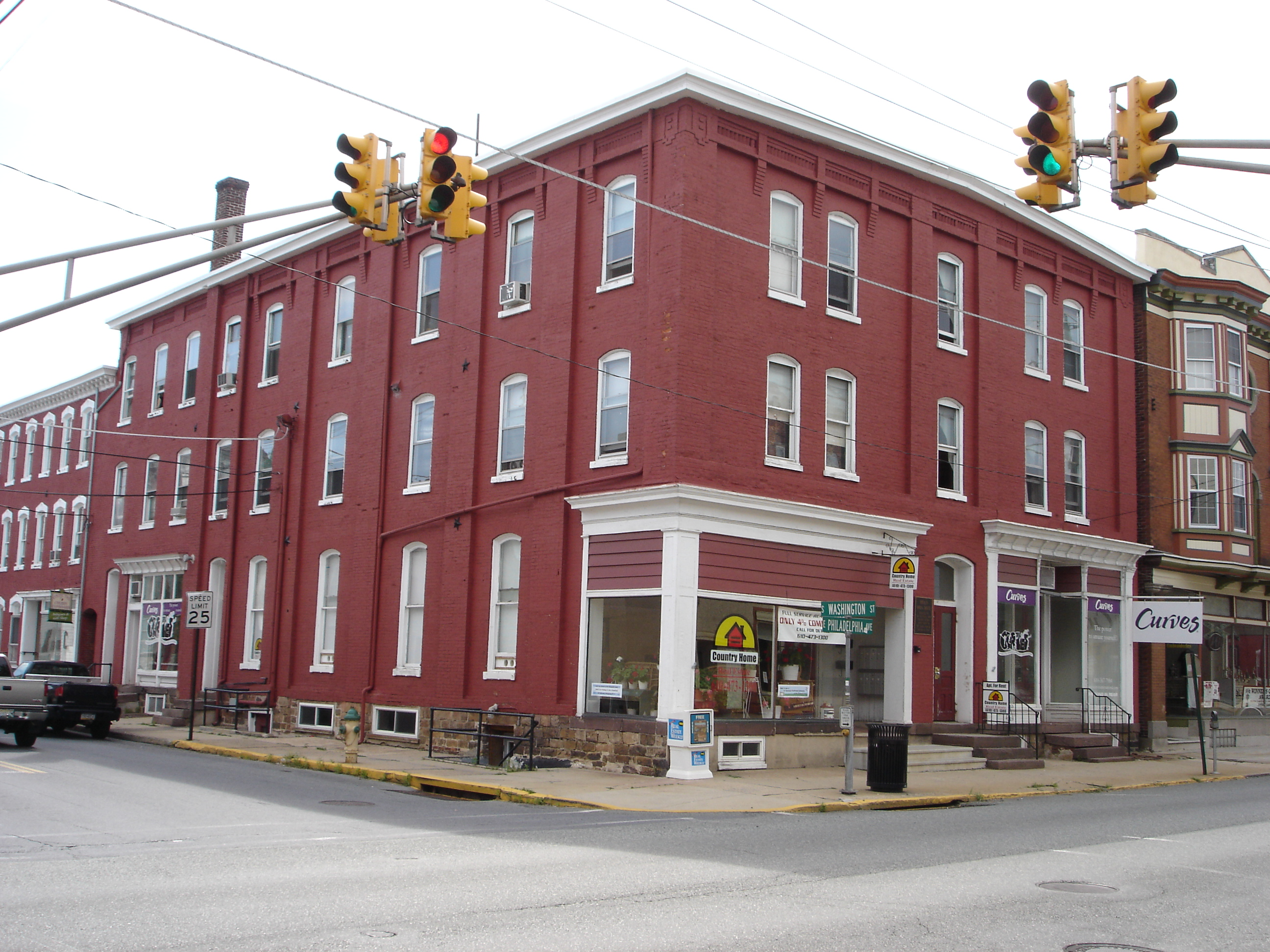
- Building on site of Rhoads Opera House at South Washington Street and East Philadelphia Avenue in Boyertown
- Date: January 13, 1908
- Venue: Rhoads Opera House
- Location: Boyertown, Pennsylvania, U.S.; 40.3318°N 75.6353°W
- Type: Fire
- Cause: Knocked over kerosene lamp
- Deaths: 171

On January 13, 1908, the Rhoads Opera House in Boyertown, Pennsylvania, caught fire during a stage play sponsored by nearby St. John's Lutheran Church. Of the approximately 400 men, women, and children either in attendance or associated with the performance of the play, 171 were killed.

== Building ==
The Rhoads Opera House was not a structure normally described as an opera house. It was a three-story commercial brick building which contained a hardware store and a bank on its first floor, an auditorium (the "opera house") and offices on its second floor, and several meeting rooms and offices on its third floor. The auditorium was a rental facility made available for public and private events such as business meetings, lectures, school graduations, and public entertainment events. The auditorium included a small stage located at the back end of the auditorium. It is doubtful that any opera was ever performed on this stage.

The present day building occupying the same site as the original Rhoads Building, on the corner of Washington Street and Philadelphia Avenue, is somewhat similar in overall appearance to the original structure. The main difference is in the overall height of the building and its second floor windows. In the new building these are approximately six feet tall, in the original building they were closer to eight feet tall. The original auditorium was approximately 12 feet in height, thus accommodating the taller windows. The present day building does not house an auditorium at all, and the second floor is consequentially of a lesser height as are its windows. Additionally, the present day building is not equipped with fire escapes. The original building had three: one on its front façade, one on the Washington Street façade, and one on the opposite side façade. In many other major characteristics the present day building is similar to the original except for certain architectural and decorative details.

The present day building was constructed approximately two years after the fire using fire insurance proceeds the building's owner and prominent Boyertown citizen, Dr. Thomas Rhoads, received as a result of the complete destruction of the original building.

== Fire ==
The play being performed on the night of January 13 was The Scottish Reformation by Harriet Earhart Monroe, who was heavily involved in the production. A slide (magic lantern) show and lecture were presented at intermission to provide historical background for the play. Approximately sixty people were involved in the production, including stagehands and others not actually performing. 312 tickets were sold for the Monday night performance, although there is no certain count of the number actually in attendance, and a number of accounts state that there were many patrons standing.

The fire started when a kerosene lamp being used for stage lighting was knocked over, starting a fire on the stage. In short order, the spreading fire ignited a mixture of lighting gas and oxygen from a malfunctioning stereopticon machine being used to present a magic lantern show at intermission. Audience members waited for the fire to be extinguished by theatre personnel, wasting the precious minutes they needed to escape safely.

The stage and auditorium were located on the second floor and the few emergency exits available were either unmarked or blocked. Two fire escapes were available but were only accessible through latched windows whose sills were located 3.5 feet (1 m) above the floor. Of the approximately 400 men, women, and children either in attendance or associated with the performance of the play, 171 perished in various ways as they tried to escape the conflagration. In the panic to escape, many were crushed in the narrow main entrance stairway, as well as against the jammed main exit swinging doors of the second floor auditorium. In a few instances, entire families were wiped out. One firefighter, John Graver, was also killed while responding to the incident.

== Investigation and legal action ==
Monroe was subpoenaed to appear before the inquest after the fire, but refused to appear. She was accused of employing an inadequately trained young man to operate the stereopticon, but the inquest's jury found her innocent. Private lawsuits were brought against Monroe by the families of several victims. The result of these lawsuits is unclear from surviving records. Monroe's sister, Della Earhart Mayers, was killed in the fire.

== Aftermath ==
According to the Pennsylvania Department of Labor and Industry, Philadelphians contributed relief funds of $18,000. Three morgues were set up and approximately fifteen thousand people attended funerals on a single day. One hundred and five new graves were dug in Boyertown's Fairview Cemetery. Just over $22,000 was received in response to an appeal for contributions toward burial of the dead.

The incident spurred the Pennsylvania legislature into passing new legislative standards for doors, landings, lighting, curtains, fire extinguishers, aisles, and marked exits. All doors were required to open outward and remain unlocked. Governor Edwin Stuart signed Pennsylvania's first fire law on May 3, 1909.

The building of apartments and stores has now been built on the former opera house's site with a plaque commemorating the tragedy.

Memorials

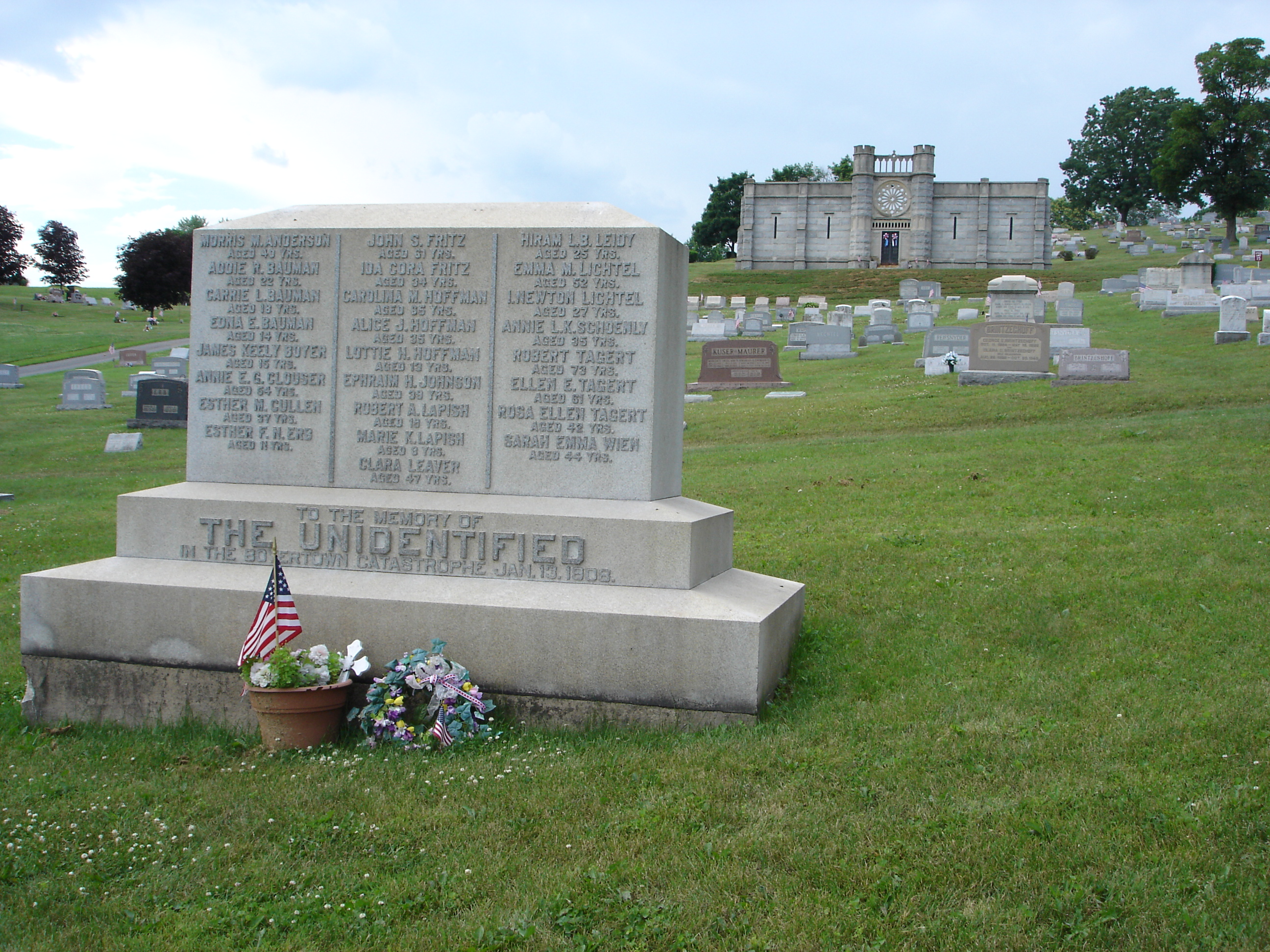
Memorial to the unidentified victims in Fairview Cemetery, Boyertown

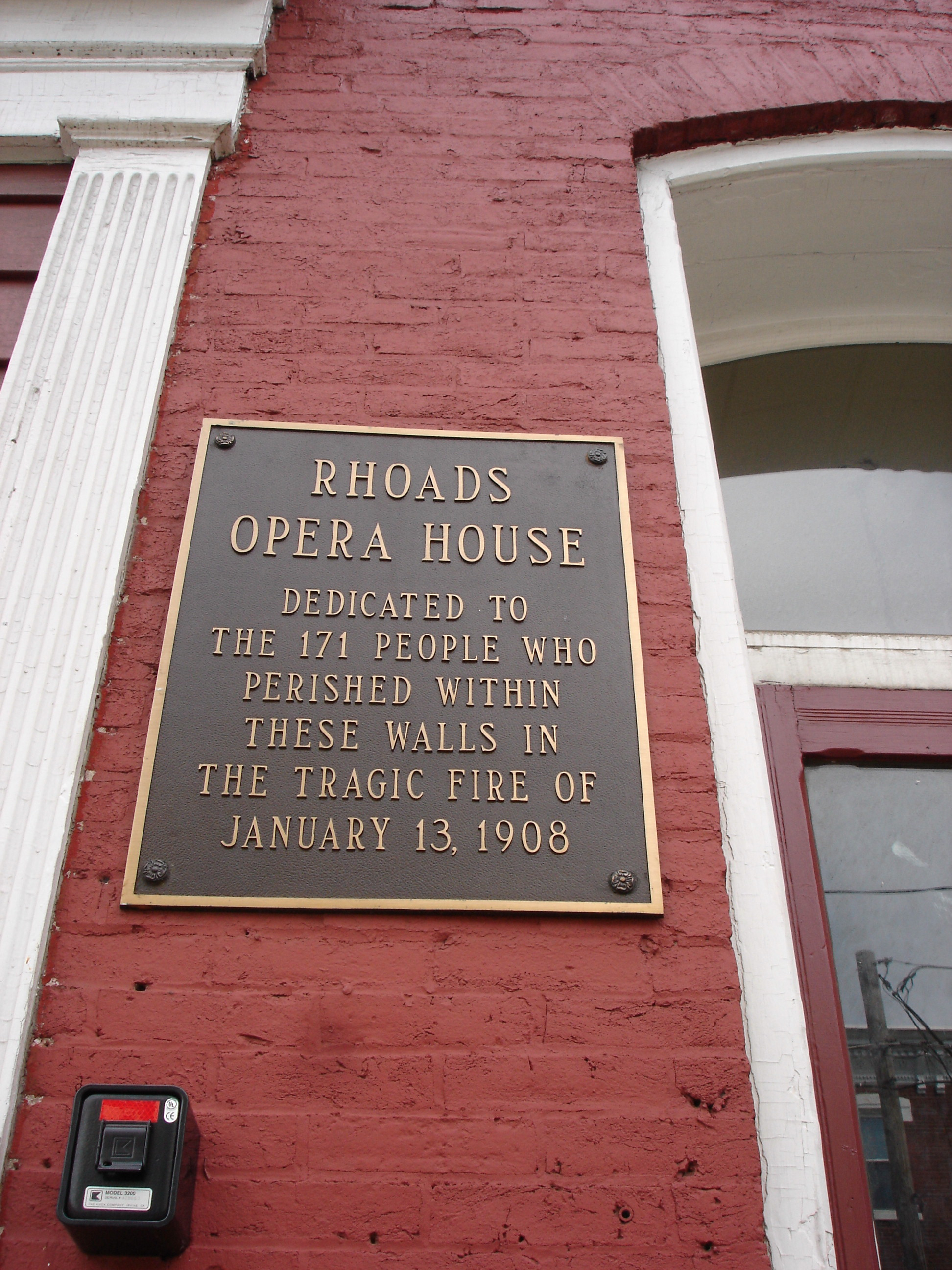
Memorial Plaque on the present day building occupying the site of the former Rhoads Opera House Building
