= History of Spanish photojournalism =

The history of Spanish photojournalism, developed since the beginning of twentieth century, was closely tied to the cultural, historical and political discourse of the time. The Spanish colonisation of Morocco (1912–1956) shaped the photojournalist practices such that, a plethora of photographs were focusing on reaffirming Spain's Islamic past and portraying the ethnic, social and cultural ties of Spain to North Africa. Technical advancements in photography led to a rising interest in photography as publishers began complementing their texts with photographs. During the Civil War (1936–1939) photojournalism served as an objective transcription of the realities of the conflict between the Republican and Nationalist forces and influenced public opinion abroad.

When Francisco Franco rose to power in 1939, photojournalism was constrained by censorship and regulations were put into place to prevent any materials critical of the regime from being circulated. The government controlled the informational input and output and articles and photographs had to be sent for consultation before being published. During this time, photographs mostly featured official events, military parades, government officials or the clergy. A new generation of photographers pushed the boundaries of conventional photojournalism at the beginning of the 1970s. An activist stance and vitality were characteristic of their photographs. After the fall of Francisco Franco in 1975, photojournalism worked as a tool used to advocate for the pro-democracy movement and helped attract international attention in regards to the lack of freedoms and civil liberties.

== Beginning of Spanish photojournalism ==
The emergence of photojournalism in Spain at the beginning of the twentieth century coincided with the colonial campaigns fostered by the country in Northern Africa. The historical context of the time marked by the Spanish colonisation of Morocco (1912–1956) led to a cultural discourse that emphasised the ties of the Moroccan civilisation to Spain and explored the influences of Spain's Islamic past on Spanish culture and society. These ties were represented on the basis of Spain's Islamic past which spanned eight centuries. The discourse, attesting Spanish-Moroccan fraternity, was transposed in visual form through a plethora of photographs evoking the Moorish trace in Spain. In this context, a lot of reflection was done by intellectuals, politicians and artists on the contribution of Spain's medieval past on the national identity of the present.

=== Photographic magazines ===
The development of photojournalism in Spain led to the creation of new photographic magazines like Nuevo Mundo (Madrid, est.1894), Mundo gráfico (Madrid, est.1911), and La Esfera (Madrid, est.1914), all of which were part of the press corporation, Prensa Gráfica, as well as La Unión Ilustrada (1909, Malaga), Blanco y Negro. Other established newspapers, such as ABC, La Libertad, and El Imparcial, began to include photographs to complement their articles in this period. During the first decades of the century, the majority of photojournalists, including those working for newspapers or magazines established later such as Estampa (est.1928, Madrid) and Ahora (est.1930, Madrid) gained notoriety mainly through the work documenting the events that took place during the Rif War (1912–1927).

=== La Unión Ilustrada ===
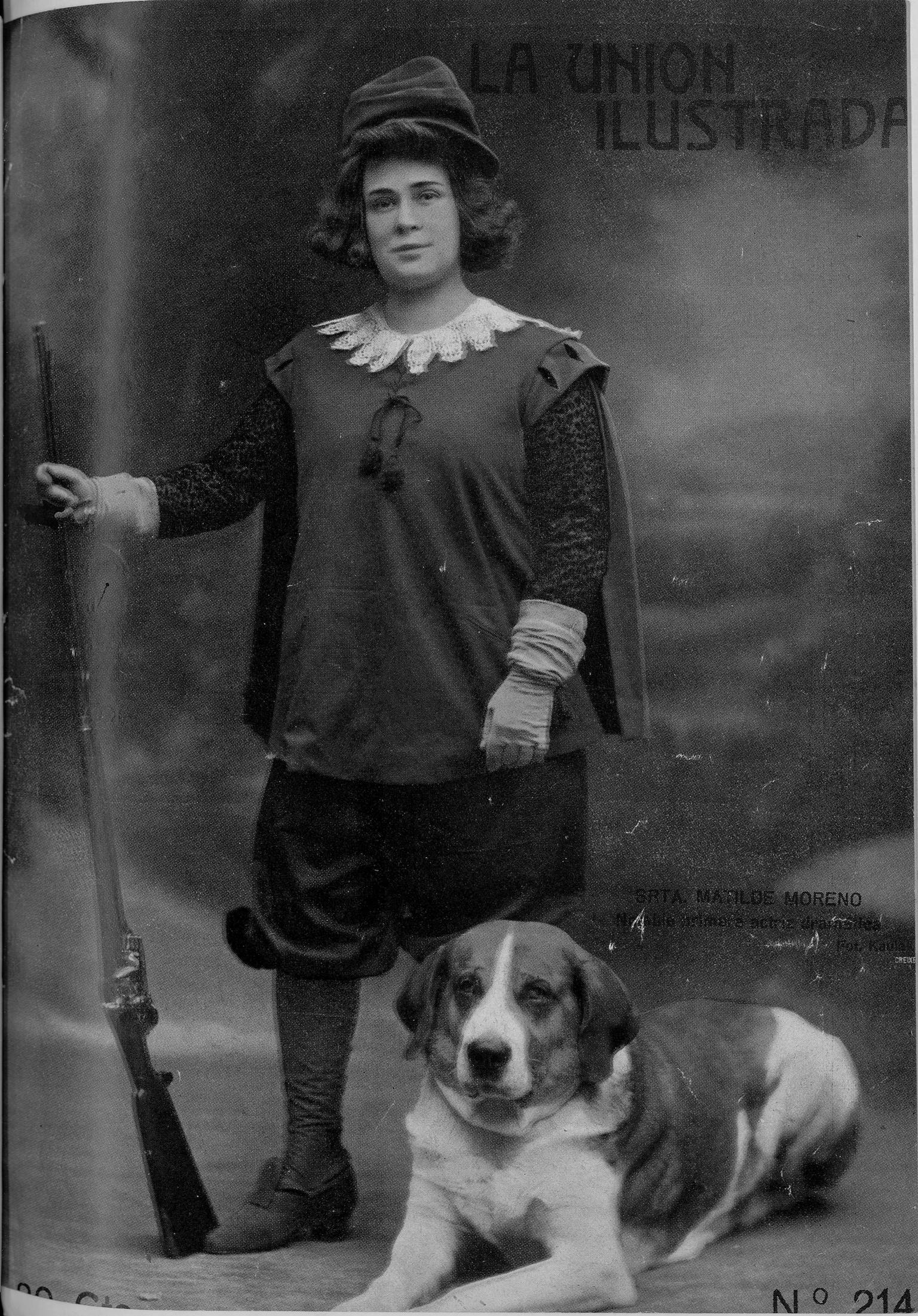
La Unión Ilustrada 19 October 1913. Photograph by Kaulak

La Unión Ilustrada became the most sold graphic magazine in Spain in the first decades of twentieth century; it circulated as a weekly since September 1909 until April 1931. The magazine dedicated the most space to cover conflicts including the War of Melilla in 1909, the Kert campaign (1911–1912), the Spanish protectorate and the Annual Disaster (1921). The magazine was structured in two parts, with the second part, the graphical section, being the most informative. Over 98 photographers worked for this magazine during the conflict and signed their work using their last name or pseudonym.

The readers of La Unión Ilustrada were middle-class and aristocracy, and censorship and high patriotism were present in its language. Themes covered by La Unión Ilustrada include battles, soldiers, wounded and dead people, police, official visits, life in the camps and religion. The language of the magazine becomes more serious and a more alarmist vision of the conflict was represented since the Annual Disaster.

=== Colonial photography ===
Apart from documenting the political and military context, the photojournalist trend of the time, that can be also referred to as colonial photography, involved the use of photographs of women and architecture as key visual representations of Spain's ethnic and cultural legacy and its Islamic heritage. The publications of the early twentieth century were characterised by an ideological inclination shaped by imperialism, seeking to justify the Spanish intervention in Northern Africa but also preserving a national identity that rejected the effects of modernity.

Photojournalism explored the architectural similarities between main cities of the Spanish Protectorate, like Tétouan or Chefchaouen, and Spanish cities with prominent Islamic heritage, like Seville, Granada, Cordoba or Toledo. Both Tétouan and Chafchaouen had Andalusi and Jewish quarters constructed by Muslim and Jewish refugees who settled in the Iberian Peninsula during the fifteenth and sixteenth centuries.

Revista de tropas coloniales was founded in 1924 by General Gonzalo Queipo de Llano and exemplifies the visual discourse of the time in sections such as La España musulmana which included Islamic art and architecture throughout Spain, and Marrueco artístico depicting scenes of Morocco, images of Islamic architectural styles without accompanying texts or captions. Photojournalism during this period mystifies spaces within Spain to provide a reconstruction of the shared medieval past of Spain and North Africa. This occurs in photographic reports of Tetuan published in La Esfera in 1922.

La Esfera targeted a politically conservative audience and provided a positive view of the Spanish colonial ventures in Morocco. Additionally, Mundo gráfico (1916) depicted the 'Moorish streets' of Granada as haunted by exiled kings of al-Andalus "where the tormented and melancholic shadows of the souls of the khalifas still wander". Nuevo mundo (1918) asserted that the cities of Andalusia still retain the mysterious spirit of the Moors. The desire to reconstruct the premodern past will later become associated with the Spanish nationalist movements of the 1930s.

The images of Spanish women tend to be exoticised in images that are reproduced and circulated throughout the nation, having them seen through an Oriental perspective. They portray the perceived ethnic as well as cultural 'Moorish' legacy within Spain. Mundo gráfico photographically reported images of the Alhambra palace and the local gypsies to evoke the "ancient legends" of "Moorish" Spain to its readers. The Rommani community of Spain has also been portrayed so that it affirms the ethnic closeness with the culture over which Spain aims to assert colonial authority. However, the Moorish trace is not restricted to the Romani people or Andalusia and magazines such as Estampa and Ahora depicted other regions of Spain where this traced is preserved.

== Spanish photojournalism during the Civil War (1936–1939) ==
The Civil War was a catalyst for some of the most dramatic imagery of the twentieth century. One of the most iconic photographs titled "Death of a Loyalist Militiaman (1937)" belongs to Robert Capa. Capa along with other photographers such as Gerda Taro, David Seymour, Alec Wainman or Kati Horna are often cited as main representatives of Spanish Civil War photography. Gerda Taro died at the Battle of Brunete in 1937. Kati Horna and Alec Wainman documented the effect of war on the non-combatants. Most of the photographic work of this time was published anonymously, containing only the copyright stamp of the news agency.

Several major news agencies deployed photographers close to the frontlines in the 1930s. These photographers remained involved from the initial uprisings until the collapse of the Second Spanish Republic in April 1939. The Civil War also served as a historical milestone for photojournalism, representing the first war to be photographed in the modern sense as covered by professional photographers, engaging militarily in the front lines and towns under bombardment. Their work was immediately noticed not only in Spanish newspapers and magazines but also circulated abroad.

Advances in photography brought by Rolleiflex and Leica allowed for the close-up action style of war coverage through the visual medium. 35 millimetres film cameras were the equipment primarily used by news photographers in the front lines. Each film allowed for thirty-six photographs before being reloaded. Freed from the use of tripod and low exposure times, photographers could get closer to the action than ever before. This rising interest in photographs of world events led to the increased emergence of picture magazines which primarily covered news through visual images with very little text. Photographs were also a preferred technique in attracting readers, which fuelled an increased interest of publishers to accompany their text with images.

During the course of the twentieth century, photography gained legitimacy as an art form and profession and subject of study. Many news consumers have deemed photographs as more objective than text in depicting the realities of conflicts, while other scholars argue that photojournalism was related to conventional notions of documentary, news, opinion, publicity and propaganda. Generally, it is thought that during the Civil War, photography offered a visual expansion of photojournalist practice, that increased truthfulness of news and attracted advocates for the use of cameras in portraying reality. However, both the Republican and Nationalist parties have used propaganda to advocate their views.

The Civil War gained unprecedented urgency because of the way it was lived and depicted. The intensity of the photographs are fuelled not only by what they depicted but also from the political and ideological historical context out of which they emerged. The photographic work done during the time of the Civil War show the visual representations of the realities of the time and also reflect the rising importance of photography in the dissemination and representation of war.

== Spanish photojournalism during the dictatorship (1939–1975) ==
During the fascist dictatorship (1939–1975) photojournalism was characterised by censorship along with other aspects of media and culture. While it was not possible to publish photographs explicitly critical of the regime, some photojournalists still tried to push the boundaries of their photographic content. After the dictatorship was installed, photojournalism became a tool for promoting a fascist ideology. This was achieved through the government closing or confiscating progressive publications, prior censorship (which remained in place until 1966), through the purge of radical journalists and the creation, in 1941, of a public journalism school. A professional license for journalists was introduced. Photographs and articles were put in circulation nationally and regionally though the government-owned news agency EFE. This owned exclusive contracts with foreign news organisations and controlled the influx of foreign news into Spain as well as the flow of information from Spain. A new press law abolishing censorship was introduced in 1966; however publishers were encouraged to submit periodicals for consultation prior to publication. Newspapers remained controlled until the 1970s with monthly and weekly magazines addressing social, political and cultural issues.

La Vanguardia Española was Spain's largest circulation daily during the dictatorship. Among the most important national-circulation, pro-democracy publications were Triunfo, Cuaderno para el Diálogo and Cambio 16. While editors constantly tested boundaries of permissible information, in many cases editions were confiscated, publications closed or fined and even imprisonment among other sanctions taken against periodicals, editors and journalists. Photography was the most tightly-controlled medium. Historian Lee Fontanella argued that photojournalism did not exist during the Franco period. Franco-era dailies and weeklies largely contained photographs of official events featuring military parades, government officials or the clergy, with photographers being given precise instructions of where to be positioned in regards to the subject. Sports photography, illustrated weeklies and cultural magazines enjoyed more freedom in terms of the photographic composition and topics as they did not directly address political aspects.

During the late 1960s and 1970s advances in technical aspects of photography made photographers mobile and allowed them to photograph events in poor lighting conditions. In the post-Franco era this new approach became the signature of new magazines in Spain, while most of the leading Spanish papers remained traditional in their technique. This difference in approach was to some extent political as some independent photographers used the techniques mentioned to collect evidence or document the activities of the clandestine opposition.

== Spanish photojournalism during the Transition era ==
After the death of Francisco Franco, photojournalism acted as a tool for advocating the establishment of civil rights in a time characterised by an unstable political climate. In the early 1970s, pro-democracy photojournalists and periodicals gave voice and visibility to critics of the government and pushed the boundaries of censorship. Photography historians have noted an activist stance of image-makers in the early 1970s and the vitality of their photographs which broke photojournalist conventions. The appearance of photographs that depicted opposition to the regime in the mainstream media was limited; mostly they were the work of freelancers, self-taught photographers with access to the opposition and to events not covered by the press.

=== Photojournalists in the Transition Era ===
Jodi Socías was one of Spain's leading photojournalists in the Transition era. He was an activist for the trade union Comisiones Obreras which provided him with special access to the labour activists and allowed him to take photographs of interest to the news weekly Cambio 16. Another important figure in photojournalism after the fall of the Franco regime was Paco Elvira. His photographs of police against student activism could not be published until after Franco's death. Manel Armengol was a freelance journalist who was taking photographs to add to his stories; his pictures of demonstrators advocating for the establishment of democracy were later circulated internationally. Pilar Aymerich was a portrait photographer who started documenting the activities of the political opposition in Barcelona and the absence of political freedom.

=== The Demonstration ===
After Franco's death the country's political climate was uncertain. Despite the lack of press freedom, democracy was debated in the press. The opposition called for restoration of civil rights and referendum on the country's political future. Pro-democracy press kept pressure on the government to move towards reform. The pro-democracy demonstrations of 1 and 8 February 1976 in Barcelona were the largest in the city since prior the Civil War, drawing approximately 75,000 participants. Although the authorities denied permission to assemble, the demonstration continued. Police arrived and demonstrators were beaten and put down on the pavement.

Armengol and other colleagues took photographs secretly due to the fear that their equipment would be confiscated or they would face arrest. Armengol recalled using an oversized flak jacket to obscure his camera gear. When taking compromising photographs he hid behind other demonstrators to remain undetected, while Pilar Aymerich draped a newspaper over the camera while photographing. The freelance photographers were marching along the crowd of demonstrators which allowed them to photograph the demonstration with the point of view of both participant and observer.

=== Photographs of Manel Armengol ===
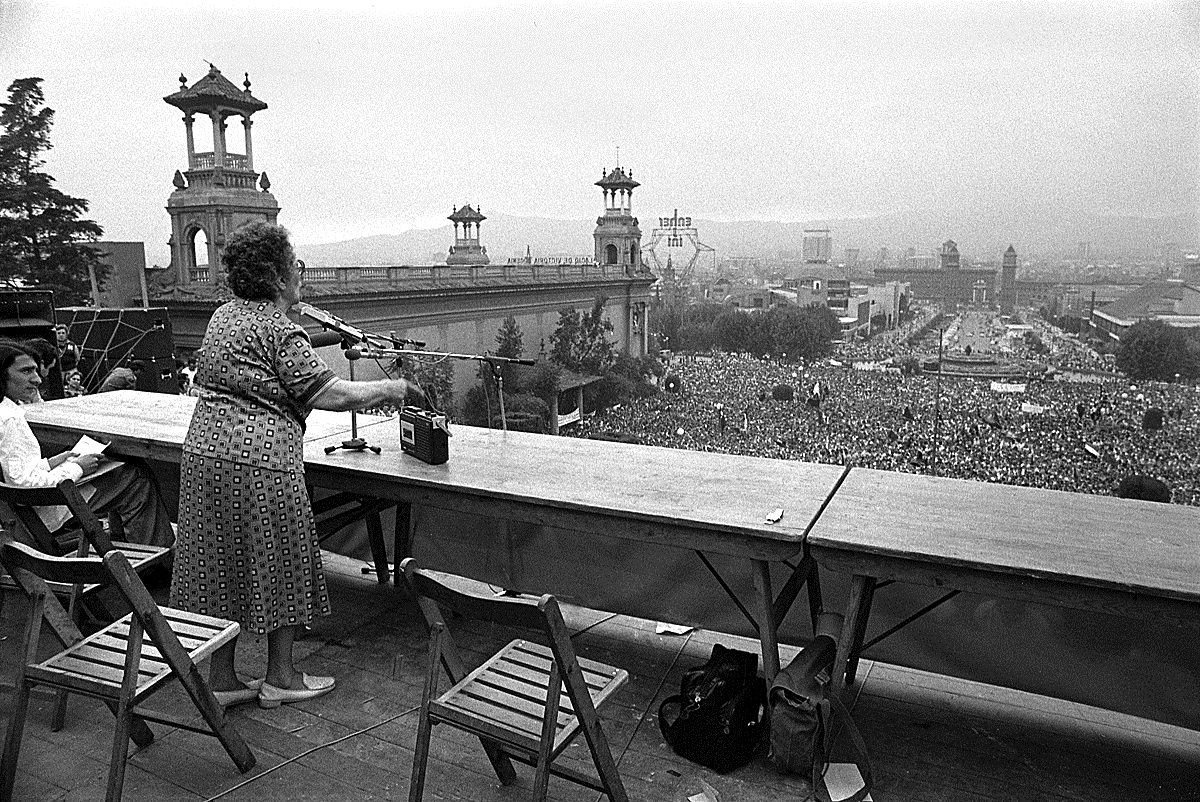
Photograph of Federica Montseny speaking at the historical meeting of the CNT in Barcelona in 1977 by Manel Armengol

One of the first photographs of Armengol during the demonstration shows the police attacking seated demonstrators. His most well-known image shows an old man seated on the ground together with other demonstrators. His hands are raised to his head to protect himself against the blows of the policemen's sticks who surrounded the group of demonstrators. Another image depicts the solidarity between protesters as they are trying to help the old man stand on his feet while the officers continue to approach the protesters with their sticks ready. Not all the pictures depict violence; some of them focus on the tenseness of the situation.

Armengol's proximity to the events enabled him to make well-composed, dynamic pictures. The emphasis on action in progress and the implied perspective emphasise the action of the police rather than those of the protesters. All the aspects conveyed in the photographs serve for the readers to identify with the photographer and with the protesters.

=== International publications ===
A common way to gain public support for the Spanish pro-democracy movement was to get critical photographs and articles published abroad. Armengol sent off his photographs by using the addresses of the publications written on newspapers. Because of the fear that his mails would be intercepted by the Spanish police he went to the Barcelona airport and ask passengers waiting to board to carry his mails.

The New York Times published Armengol's image on 15 February with a caption reading "Spanish Police in Action". The photograph was called upon to illustrate the oppressive methods of the Spanish state and the strength of popular opposition.

Newsweek also published one of Armengol's images captioned "Spanish police batter demonstrators: Down with the Fascist Monarchy", accompanying an article that reports on a demonstration in the Basque Country.

National Police beating demonstrators in Barcelona functions as a reference to the atmosphere in Spain and highlights the biggest threat against democratic change- the right wing commanders of the armed forces. The negative image formed abroad helped the opposition advance their case for the establishment of democracy, political freedoms and civil liberties.

=== Spanish publications ===
Three Spanish publications published the graphic pictures showing police brutality: Mundo Diario (1976), Ciudadano and Por Favor (Marse, 1976).
