= Harriet Earhart Monroe =

American lecturer, educator, writer, theater producer

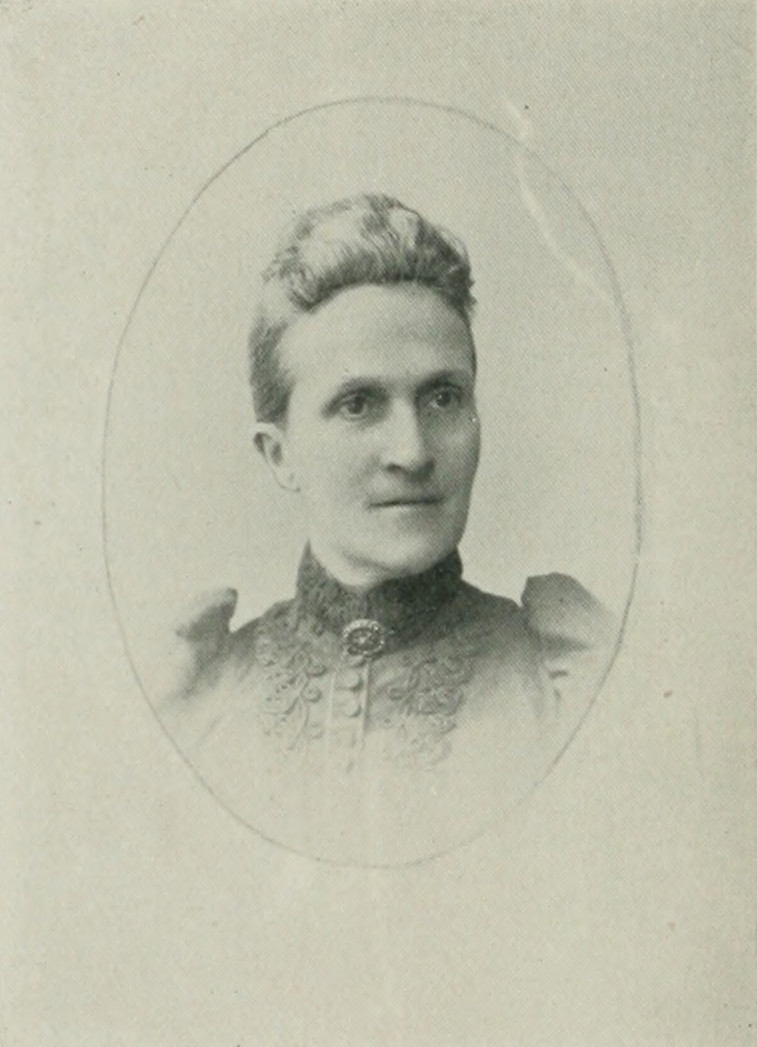
- A woman of the century
- Born: Harriet Earhart; August 21, 1842; Indiana, Pennsylvania, U.S.
- Died: July 17, 1927 (aged 84); Washington, D.C.
- Resting place: Mount Vernon Cemetery, Atchison, Kansas
- Occupations: lecturer, educator, writer, traveling producer of religious stage plays
- Spouse: A. Q. Monroe (m. 1865)
- Writing career
- Notable work: The Scottish Reformation

Harriet Earhart Monroe (August 21, 1842 – July 17, 1927) was an American lecturer, educator, writer, and traveling producer of religious stage plays. She was also well known for her work in Christian psychology and theology. One of her plays was being performed during the Rhoads Opera House fire.

Monroe lectured in large auditoriums from Boston to Omaha, and in the South Atlantic states. She was an active worker in city gospel mission work, in her own church, and in associated charities. She wrote a weekly letter to the Lutheran Observer (Philadelphia and Lancaster, Pennsylvania). Monroe favored woman suffrage.

== Early years and education ==
Harriet Earhart was born in Indiana, Pennsylvania, August 21, 1842. She was the daughter of Rev. David Earhart and Mary W. (Patton) Earhart, of Atchison, Kansas. Her father, a Lutheran minister, went to Kansas as a missionary in 1860. Her siblings were Della E. Earhart Mayers (1857–1908) and Samuel Stanton Earhart (1867–1930).

She was educated by private tutors.

== Career ==
Monroe was a teacher in Kansas when the Civil War broke out, and during that conflict, she went to Clinton, Iowa, where she taught until peace was restored. She returned to Kansas and in 1865, married A. Q. Monroe. Her only daughter, Mabel, died in infancy, and her only son, Eugene E., became president of the Atchinson (Kansas) College Institute (1870–85). In 1870, thrown upon her own resources, she opened a private school in Atchison, which grew rapidly into a collegiate institute with over 200 students in regular attendance. During her thirteen years in that school, she had 2,621 students under her charge. In 1885, her health failed and she was compelled to give up the school.

She then went to Washington, D.C., and until 1887, served as correspondent for a number of western journals. Not liking the personal element in journalism, she decided to enter the lecture field. In that line of effort, she succeeded in a remarkable degree. From May, 1888, to May, 1891, she lectured 60 nights in Philadelphia, 69 nights in Pittsburgh, 16 nights in Washington, and 25 nights in New York City and Brooklyn. Her lectures were on religious, artistic, war, temperance, personal, economic and historical topics. They showed a range of reading and research. Her first book, Past Thirty, was published in 1878. Her Art of Conversation (New York, 1889) found an extraordinary sale. In New Jersey, Delaware, and Pennsylvania, she lectured before teachers' institutes. She visited Europe twice in the preparation of her lectures. Her observations of European school methods were published in various articles. Her permanent home was in Philadelphia.

Monroe spent twelve years in Philadelphia, PA speaking and volunteering at Sunday Breakfast Association. She wrote "Twice Born Men in America" which is an article about the psychological impacts of rescue missions and homelessness in the United States.

=== Rhoads Opera House fire ===
The Rhoads Opera House fire occurred on Monday evening, January 13, 1908 in Boyertown, Pennsylvania. The play, The Scottish Reformation was authored by Monroe sometime prior to 1894. It had been performed a few dozen times at venues in the northeastern states before its final, tragic 1908 performance in Boyertown. She provided the scripts, the stage props and the costumes used in her plays. The sponsor, in this case St. John's Lutheran Church, supplied the performance venue, the actors and the stage hands. Monroe and her sister, Mrs. Della Mayers, rehearsed the production's singers and actors, and directed the play. The profits from the ticket sales were divided between Monroe and the sponsor. A slide (magic lantern) show and accompanying lecture was included at the intermission periods to provide historical background for the stage play.

Approximately 60 persons were involved in the performance of The Scottish Reformation, some of these served non-acting support functions. All actors were either St John's parishioners or Boyertown residents. There were no professional actors in the performance. The play was to be performed twice in Boyertown, once on Monday night and again on Tuesday night. 312 seat tickets were sold for the Monday night performance. The exact number of audience members is unknown because no official entry count was taken. According to a number of written accounts, there were also a large number of standing patrons. However, the figure of 312 is generally used as an approximation of patron attendance in the various renditions of the events of that Monday night. Mrs. Monroe was not present for the fateful Monday night performance. Her sister, Della, perished in the catastrophe.

Monroe was subpoenaed to appear before an official inquest which was held a few weeks after the fire to determine its cause and assess blame. She refused to appear. Although accused of employing an inadequately trained young man to operate the stereopticon slide projector, the inquest's jury found her innocent of any wrongdoing. Private lawsuits were brought against Monroe by the families of several victims. The result of these lawsuits is unclear from the surviving historical records.

== Death ==
Monroe was the paternal aunt of aviator Amelia Earhart. Monroe died on July 17, 1927, in Washington, DC, and is buried in the Mount Vernon Cemetery, Atchison.

== Works ==
- Monroe, Mrs. H. E. (1879). Past thirty. Philadelphia: For the Author. LCCN 07031815.
- Monroe, Harriett Earhart (1889). The art and science of conversation, and treatises on other subjects pertaining to teaching. New York and Chicago: A. S. Barnes & company. LCCN 33039253.
- Monroe, Harriett Earhart (1894). The Scottish Reformation.
- Monroe, Harriet Earhart (1894). The heroine of the mining camp. Philadelphia: Lutheran Publication Society. LCCN 07031816.
- Monroe, Harriet Earhart (1903). Washington, its sights and insights. New York, London: Funk & Wagnalls. LCCN 03010711.
- Monroe, Harriet Earhart (1909). Washington, its sights and insights. New York and London: Funk & Wagnalls company. LCCN 09026652.
- Monroe, Harriet Earhart (1910). History of the life of Gustavus Adolphus II., the hero-general of the reformation. Philadelphia: The Lutheran publication society. LCCN 10025885.
- Monroe, Mrs. Harriet E. (1914). Twice born in men America ... Philadelphia.
- Monroe, Harriet Earhart (1916). Historical Lutheranism : in one hundred questions and answers (10th rev. ed.). Philadelphia: Lutheran Publication Society. LCCN 16024703.
- Monroe, Harriet Earhart (1917). The pageant of Protestantism, celebrating the quadricentennial of the reformation. Philadelphia: The Lutheran Publication Society. LCCN 17006641.
