= Ivar Alnæs =

Norwegian teacher and linguist (1868–1956)

Ivar Johannes Alnæs (October 5, 1868 – April 2, 1956) was a Norwegian teacher and linguist.

Alnæs was born in Fredrikstad, the son of the school principal Jørgen Lauritz Alnæs and Elise Martine Hansen. He was the brother of the composer Eyvind Alnæs. He enrolled in university studies in 1887 and received a candidatus magisterii in 1894. He was an adjunct instructor and senior instructor at the Hammersborg Elementary School in Oslo from 1902 to 1917. From 1918 to 1937 he was the chancellor of Aars and Voss Upper Secondary School. He also taught at the University of Oslo from 1918 onward.

He served as the editor of the journal Den høiere skole (Secondary School) from 1902 to 1913 and was a consultant for the Ministry of Church Affairs on orthographic issues from 1907 onward. From 1913 to 1917 he was a member of the ministry's orthographic committee. He was the head of the National Union of Language and Science Teachers (Norwegian: Filologenes og Realistenes landsforening) from 1922 to 1925 and became a member of the Norwegian Academy of Science and Letters in 1928.

Alnæs published textbooks in English and Norwegian, a book on letters and forms (Brev- og formularbok, 1943), and a Norwegian pronouncing dictionary (Norsk uttaleordbok, 1910). In 1916 he received his PhD with the dissertation Norsk sætningsmelodi, dens forhold til ordmelodien (The Relation of Norwegian Sentence Intonation to Word Intonation).
