= Adolf Fonahn =

Norwegian physician, medical historian and orientalist

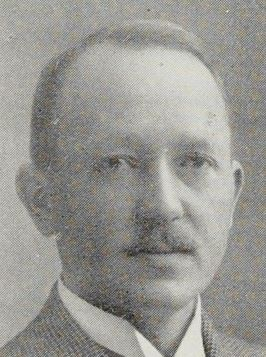
Adolf Fonahn

Adolf Mauritz Fonahn (15 June 1873 – 21 August 1940) was a Norwegian physician, medical historian and orientalist. He is best known for his work including those revolving around Tibetan Buddhism, Leonardo da Vinci's anatomical drawings (where he was one of the first who interpreted Leonardo's mirror writing), early Persian and Arabic medical literature, and more generally the study of medical history and Asian languages.

Fonahn is known for his diverse areas of interest and multitude of his works; these included Zur Quellenkunde der persischen Medizin (Persian Medicine and its Source) published in 1910 in Leipzig, Germany, Orm og ormmidler i nordiske medicinske skrifter fra middelalderen (? Norwegian Medicine from the Middle Ages) published in 1905, Arabic and Latin anatomical terminology: chiefly from the Middle Ages in 1922, A Palmyrene man's Name in Arabic transcription on a surgical bronze instrument in 1920, Japanese ornamented arrow-heads in 1929, and translations of multiple works for Leonardo da Vinci given out in such publications as 24 fogli della Royal Library di Windsor: Cuore: Anatomia e fisiologia (24 sheets of the Windsor Royal Library on heart anatomy and physiology) in 1912.
