= The Peasants =

Novel by Władysław Reymont

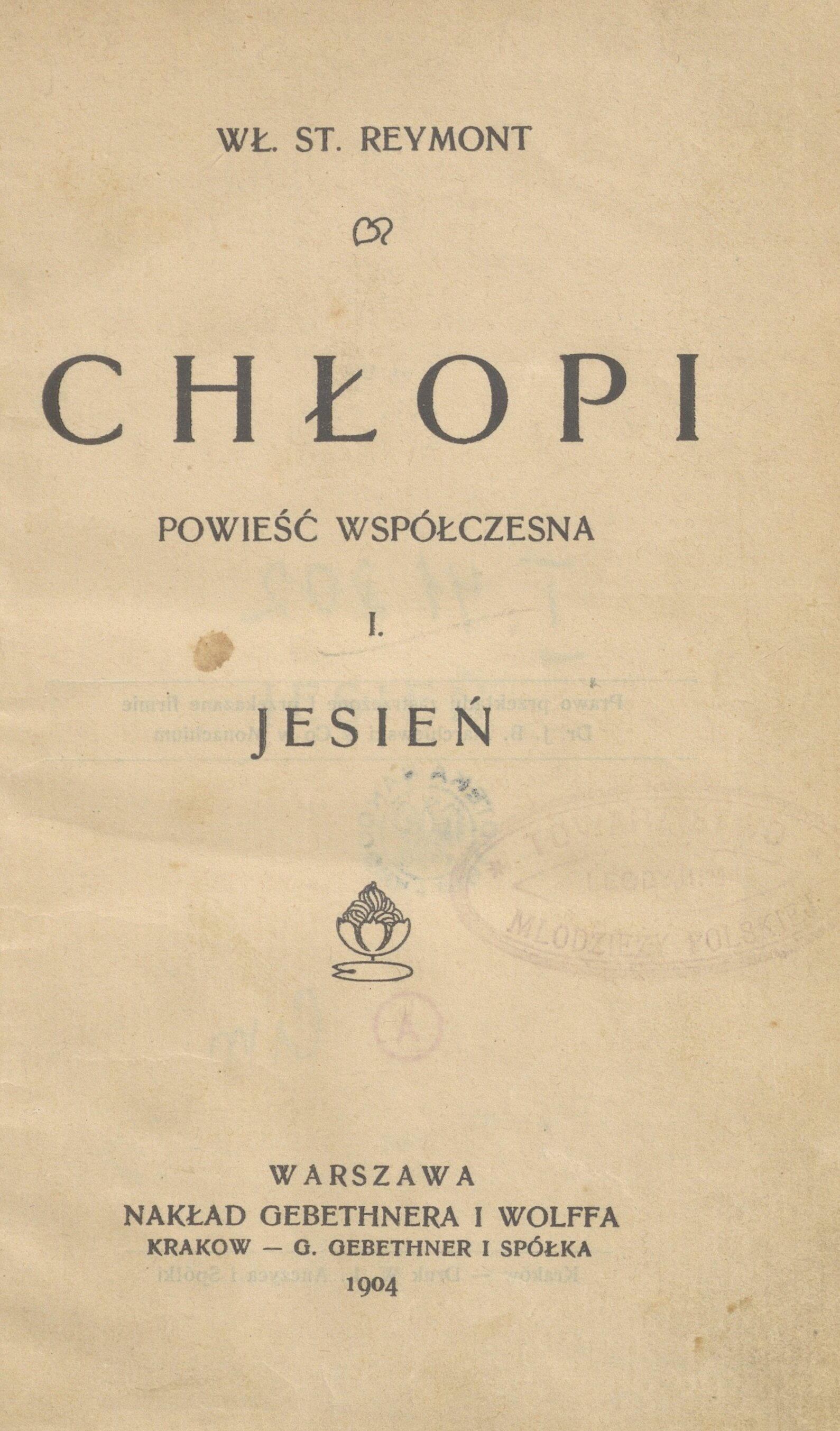
- Title page of the first edition, 1904
- Author: Władysław Reymont
- Original title: Chłopi
- Translator: Michael Henry Dziewicki; Anna Zaranko
- Language: Polish
- Genre: novel
- Set in: Poland, late 19th century
- Publisher: Tygodnik Illustrowany (first parts); Gebethner i Wolff (bound edition)
- Publication date: 1904 (Vol I, II), 1906 (Vol III), 1909 (Vol IV)
- Publication place: Congress Poland
- English publication date: 1924
- Media type: Print: hardback
- Awards: 1924 Nobel Prize in Literature
- Dewey Decimal: 891.8536
- LC Class: PG7158.R4 C5
- Original text: Chłopi at Polish Wikisource

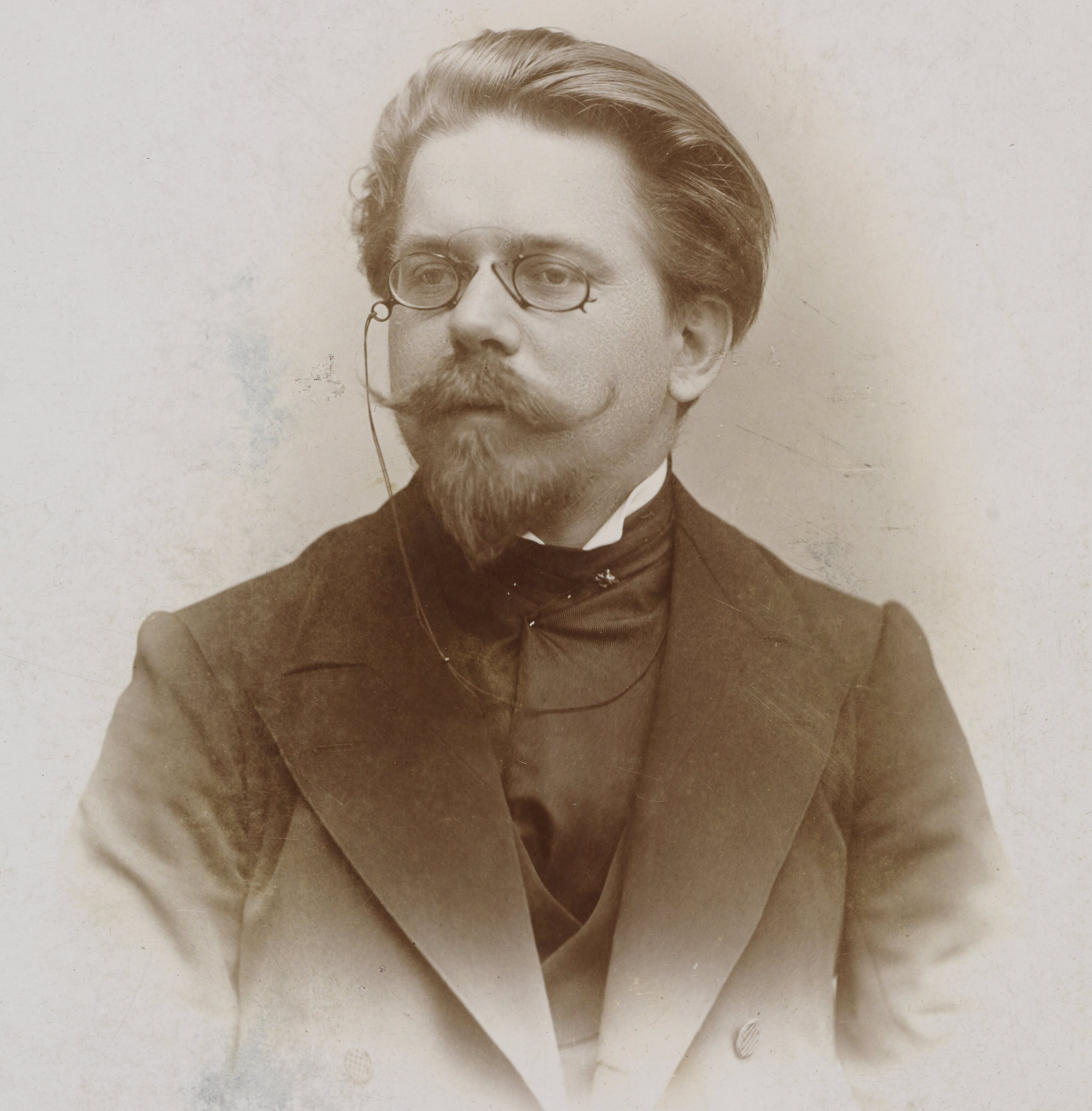
Władysław Reymont, ca 1897

The Peasants (Polish: Chłopi) is a novel written by the Polish author Władysław Reymont in four parts between 1904 and 1909. He started writing it in 1897, but because of a railway accident and health problems, it took seven years to complete. The first parts of the story were published in the weekly magazine Tygodnik Illustrowany. The novel has been translated into at least 27 languages. Władysław Reymont received the 1924 Nobel Prize in Literature for this work.

== Description ==
Each of the four parts represents a season in the life of the peasants – Autumn (published in 1904), Winter (published in 1904), Spring (published in 1906), and Summer (published in 1909). This division underlines the relationship of human life with nature.

== Main characters ==
- Maciej Boryna – the richest man in the village and the main character of the novel.
- Antek Boryna – Maciej's son, husband of Hanka
- Hanka Boryna – Antek's wife and a mother of three children
- Jagna – a beautiful 19-year-old girl and the main female character of the novel.

=== Family Tree and Relationships of Selected Characters at the beginning of the novel ===
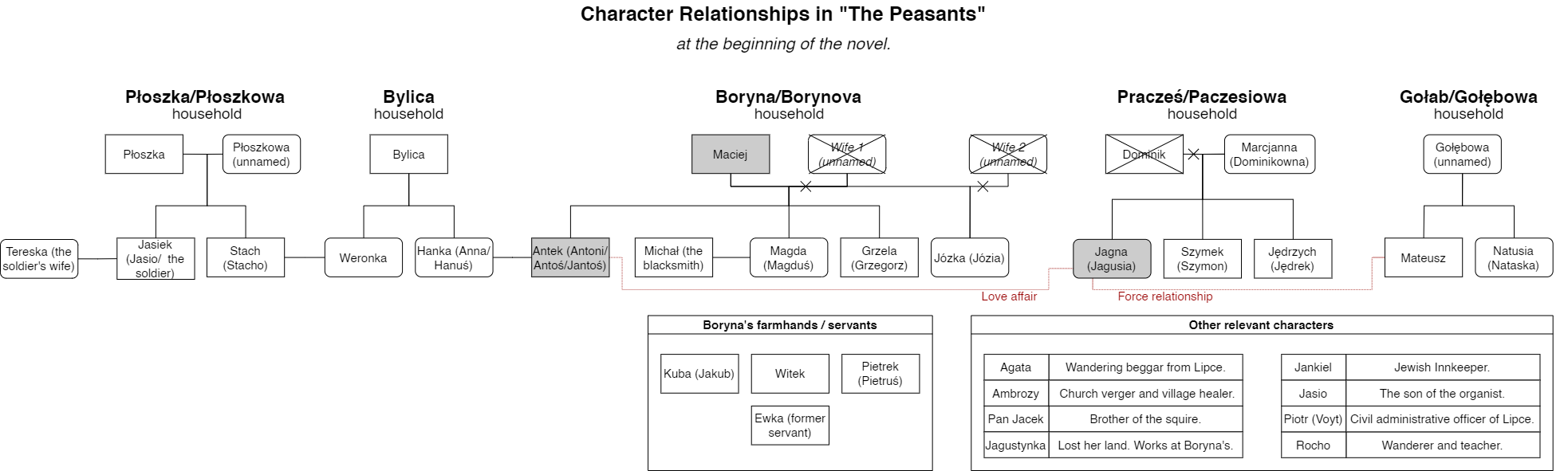
Family Tree and Interfamilial relationships of the characters featured in Władysław Reymont's novel The Peasants. Based on the "List of Selected Character Names" appendix on Anna Zaranko's 2023 English translation of the book.

== Main themes and events ==
- The conflict between Antek and his father which is connected with a piece of land and a beautiful woman – Jagna.
- Hanka's struggle to salvage her marriage and family.
- The poignant story of the farmhand – Jakub.
- The unrest sown by the attentions of assorted men of the village toward Jagna.
- The tension between the peasants and the nobility, over the disputed sale of the peasants' forest.
- The patterns of the peasants' lives closely tracking the seasons.
- The beggar Old Agata and her transit into and out of the village corresponding with the passage of the seasons and the tenacity of life.

== Customs and traditions ==
The Peasants deals not only with the everyday life of people, but also with traditions connected with the most important Polish festivals.
1. Traditions connected with wedding and marriage:

- preparation for a wedding and a marriage
- decoration of a dance-hall
- the cutting of a bride's hair (symbolic of starting a new life)
- the first dance during a wedding is dedicated to bride
- wedding games etc.

2. Traditions connected with Christmas:

- baking cakes, cooking Christmas meals
- selling of holy wafer by carol singers
- Christmas supper
- going to the church for midnight mass

3. Traditions connected with Easter:

- breaking of Lenten fast
- dyeing eggs
- “wet Monday”

4. Traditions connected with everyday life:

- pickling of cabbage
- spinning of wool
- following of folk wisdom to plant agricultural crops

== Art movements included in the novel ==
Impressionism - a style in painting developed in France in the late 19th century that uses colour to show the effects of light on things and to suggest atmosphere rather than showing exact details. In the book we can find impressionism in the descriptions of nature.
Naturalism - a style of art or writing that shows people, things and experiences as they really are. In the book naturalism is used to present everyday life. The most famous fragment of the book when naturalism is shown is when Jakub – the farmhand - is cutting his leg.
Realism - a style in art or literature that shows things and people as they are in real life (detailed descriptions of nature, traditions, everyday life and heroes).
Symbolism - the use of symbols to represent ideas, especially in art and literature (the scene of the Maciej's death, which symbolises a strong relationship between people and nature).

== English translations ==
The novel was first translated into English by Michael Henry Dziewicki and published in 1924.

A new English translation, by Anna Zaranko, was published in November 2022.

== Screen adaptations ==
The Peasants was adapted for the screen in 1922, 1972, 1973, and 2023.

A 1922 film adaptation was directed by Eugeniusz Modzelewski; all copies (even incomplete ones) were lost during WWII.

A 1972 TV miniseries adaptation was directed by Jan Rybkowski, who also directed the 1973 film adaptation.

In 2020, it was announced that an animated film based on the novel was to be released with a full trailer revealed. The film is directed by Dorota Kobiela and, much like her previous film Loving Vincent, the film is entirely rotoscoped with paintings. The world premiere took place at the Toronto International Film Festival on September 13, 2023, in the Special Presentations section.
