= Rudolf Maria Holzapfel =

Austrian philosopher

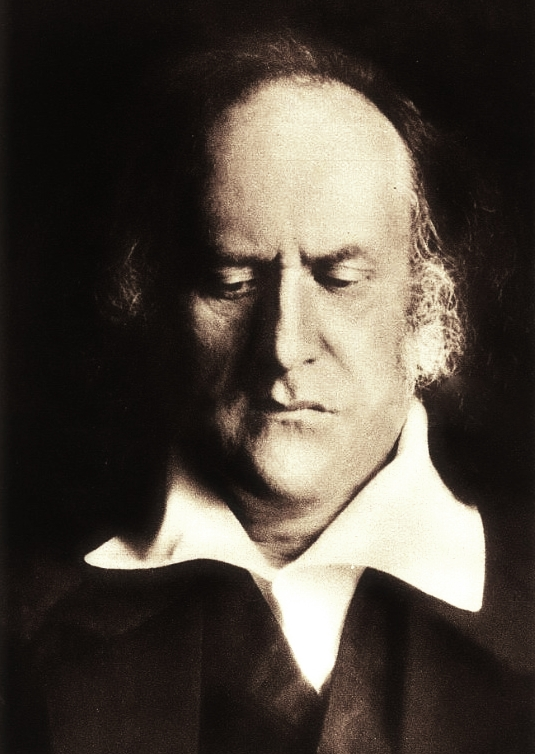
Rudolf Maria Holzapfel

Rudolf Maria Holzapfel (26 April 1874, Kraków – 8 February 1930, Muri bei Bern) was a Polish-born Austrian psychologist and philosopher. He was nominated for the Nobel Prize in Literature six times.

== Literary works ==
- Panidealische Psychologie der sozialen Gefühle, 1901
- Panideal. Das Seelenleben und seine soziale Neugestaltung, 2 vols., new ed., 1923
- Welterlebnis, 2 vols., 1928
- Nachgelassene Schriften, 1932
