= Édouard Estaunié =

French novelist

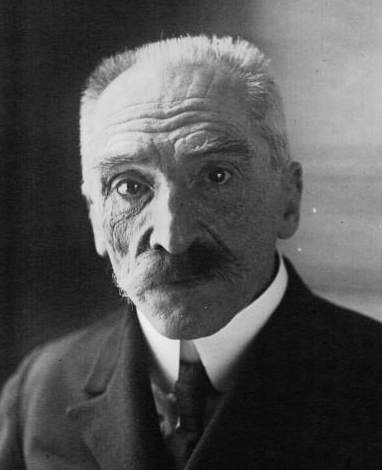
Édouard Estaunié

Édouard Estaunié (4 February 1862 in Dijon – 2 April 1942 in Paris) was a French novelist. Estaunié trained as a scientist and engineer, working at the Post and Telegraph service and training further in Holland, before turning to the novel in 1891. In 1904, he devised the word "telecommunication" in his Traité pratique de télécommunication électrique. He was elected to the Académie française in 1923. He was also a reviewer, critic, and homme de lettres as well as a novelist.

== Biography ==
Estaunié was born on 4 February 1862 in Dijon. His first novels, Un simple and Bonne Dame, published in 1891, were naturalistic works about provincial mores. Many of his works were set in the provinces, especially in Burgundy. His next novel, L'Empreinte (1896), a satire of life at a Jesuit college, was based on his education and reflected Estaunié's anticlerical views.

After his first three works, Estaunié's novels began to focus on everything that is silenced and unspoken in his characters' lives. In this period, spiritual phenomena, such as "the soul, the 'secret life', and solitude", were "the dominating realities in Estaunié's universe"

In 1908, his novel La Vie secrète won the Prix Femina.

He was elected to the Académie française on 15 November 1923, taking the chair formerly occupied by Alfred Capus. He was also the president of the Société des gens de lettres between 1926 and 1929.

Estaunié died on 1 April 1942, in Paris, two months after his 80th birthday.

== Works ==
=== Novels ===
- Un simple (1891)
- Bonne Dame (1891)
- L'Empreinte (1896)
- Le Ferment (1899)
- L'Épave (1891)
- La Vie secrète (prix Femina, 1908)
- Les choses voient (1913)
- Solitudes (stories, 1917)
- L'ascension de M. Baslèvre (1920)
- L'appel de la route (1921). Translated by Ezra Pound in 1923 as The Call of the Road
- L'infirme aux mains de lumière (1923)
- Tels qu'ils furent (1927)
- Madame Clapain (1932)

=== Scientific works ===
- Les sources de l'énergie électrique (1895)
- Traité pratique de télécommunication électrique (télégraphie, téléphonie) (1904)

== Works about Estaunié ==
- Daniel-Rops: Édouard Estaunié, Librairie Félix Alcar, 1931.
- John Charpentier et Francis Ambrière, Estaunié, Paris, Firmin Didot, coll. « Visages Contemporains » (n^{o} 4), 1932.
- Camille Cé, Regards sur l’œuvre d'Édouard Estaunié, Genève, Droz, 1977.
- Georges Cesbron, Edouard Estaunié, romancier de l'être, Paris, Droz, 1977.
- Ruth Eunice Carter Hok, Édouard Estaunié : The Perplexed Positivist, N.Y., King's Crown Press, 1949.

Cultural offices
Preceded by Alfred Capus	Seat 24; Académie française 1923-1942	Succeeded by Louis-Pasteur Vallery-Radot
