= 1969 Nobel Prize in Literature =

- Samuel Beckett
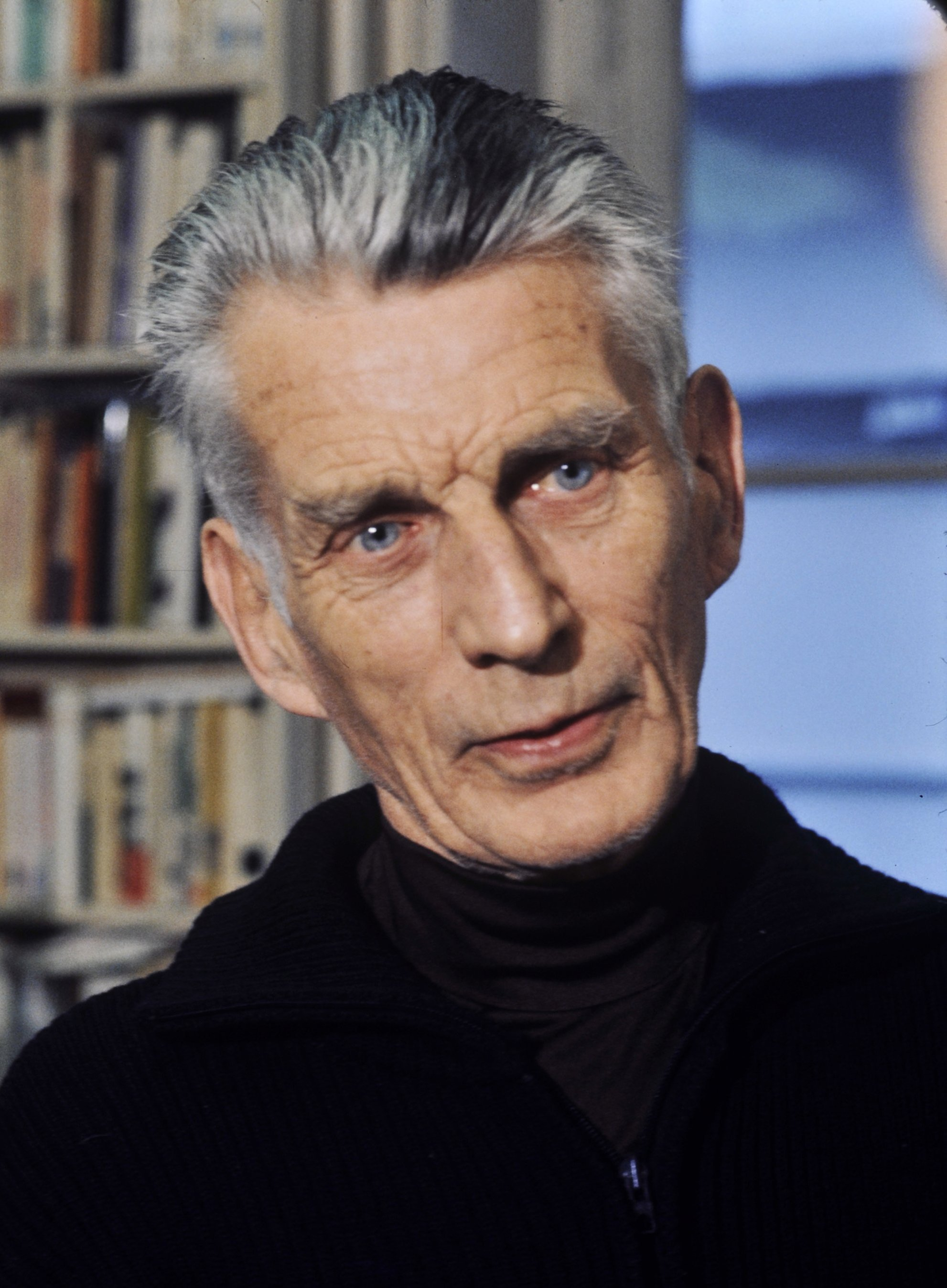
- "for his writing, which - in new forms for the novel and drama - in the destitution of modern man acquires its elevation"
- Date: 23 October 1969 (announcement); 10 December 1969 (ceremony)
- Location: Stockholm, Sweden
- Presented by: Swedish Academy
- First award: 1901
- Website: Official website

The 1969 Nobel Prize in Literature was awarded to the Irish author Samuel Beckett (1906–1989) "for his writing, which - in new forms for the novel and drama - in the destitution of modern man acquires its elevation".

== Laureate ==
Samuel Beckett produced his most important works – four novels, two dramas, a collection of short stories, essays, and art criticism – during an intensely creative period in the late 1940s. He had settled in France and wrote in both French and English. His experiences during World War II – insecurity, confusion, exile, hunger, deprivation – came to shape his writing. In his most famous work, the drama En attendant Godot (Waiting for Godot, 1952), he examines the most basic foundations of our lives with strikingly dark humor. Among his other famous literary works include Krapp's Last Tape (1958), Happy Days (1961) and The Molloy Trilogy (1955–58).

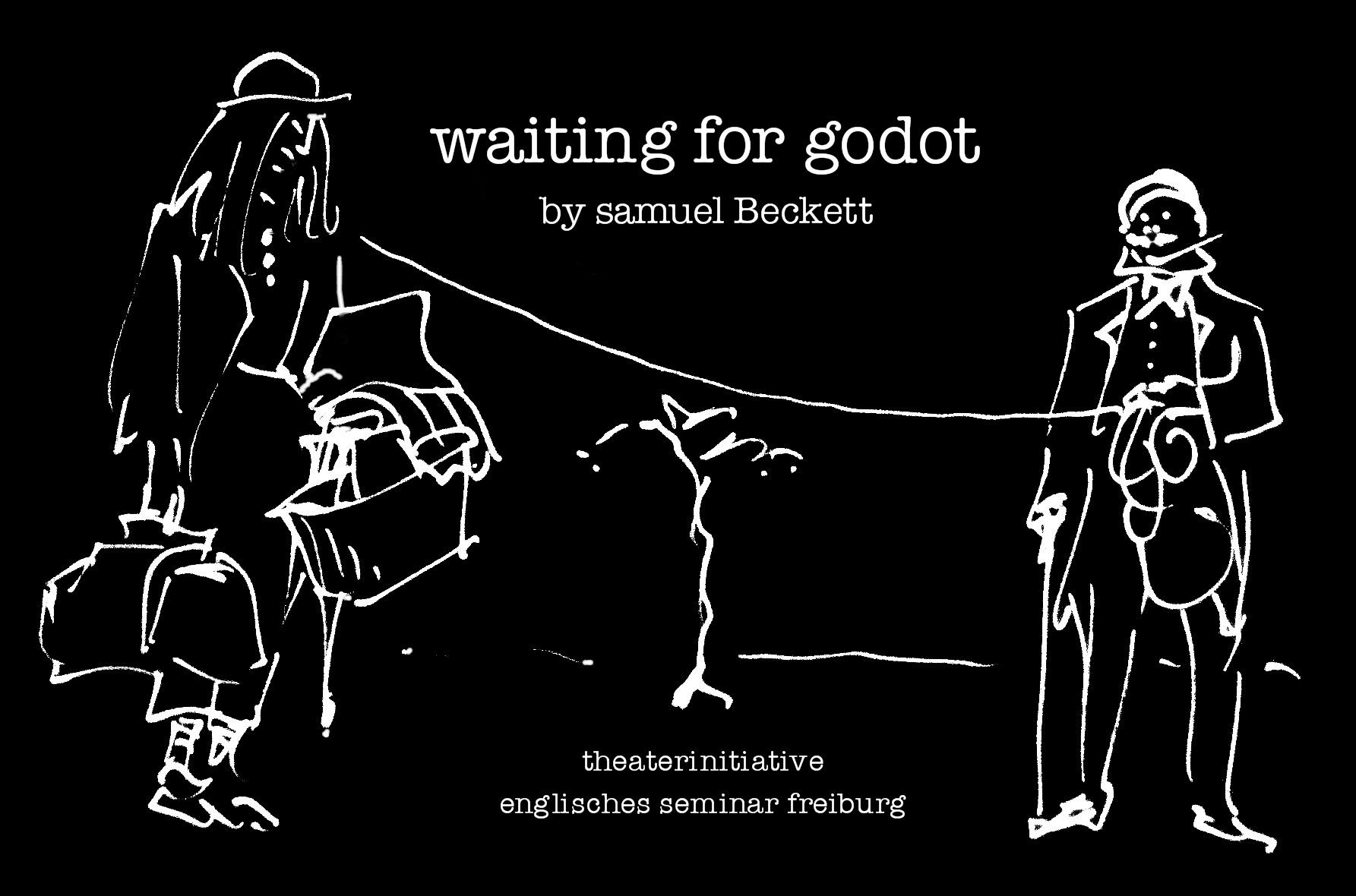
Poster for drama performance of Beckett's Waiting for Godot.

== Deliberations ==
=== Nominations ===
In total, the Swedish Academy received 184 nominations for 103 writers. Samuel Beckett was nominated in 26 occasions since 1957, and received 5 nominations for the 1969 prize with which he was awarded afterwards.

Nominees included were André Malraux, Simone de Beauvoir, Jorge Luis Borges, Pablo Neruda (awarded in 1971), Heinrich Böll (awarded in 1972), Eugenio Montale (awarded in 1975), Günter Grass (awarded in 1999), Jorge Amado, Louis Aragon, Witold Gombrowicz, Vladimir Nabokov, Alberto Moravia, Robert Graves, W. H. Auden and Graham Greene. 30 of the nominees were nominated first-time, among them Aimé Césaire, Aleksandr Solzhenitsyn (awarded in 1970), Arthur Miller, Jacques Maritain, Tawfiq al-Hakim, Edward Albee, Yasushi Inoue and Elias Canetti (awarded in 1981). The nominees who were with the highest number of nominations received – 8 nominations each – were André Malraux, Giuseppe Ungaretti and Tarjei Vesaas. The oldest nominee was Belgian writer Stijn Streuvels (aged 98) and the youngest were Ivan Drach and Hannu Salama (both aged 33 at the time). Five of the nominees were women: Anna Seghers, Nathalie Sarraute, Simone de Beauvoir, Marie Under and Elisaveta Bagryana. The 1951 Nobel laureate Swedish author Pär Lagerkvist nominated his countrymen and colleagues in the Swedish Academy, authors Eyvind Johnson and Harry Martinson who would share the prize in 1974.

The authors Alejandro G. Abadilla, Giovanni Comisso, Ivy Compton-Burnett, Richmal Crompton, Floyd Dell, Harry Emerson Fosdick, Emilio Frugoni, Jack Kerouac, Eugenia Kielland, Norman Lindsay, Erika Mann, Elizaveta Polonskaya, Phraya Anuman Rajadhon, Zoila Ugarte de Landivar, and John Wyndham died in 1969 without having been nominated the prize. The Polish playwright Witold Gombrowicz and Belgian writer Stijn Streuvels died months before the announcement.

Official list of nominees and their nominators for the prize
No.	Nominee	Country	Genre(s)	Nominator(s)
1	Tawfiq al-Hakim (1898–1987)	Egypt	novel, drama, essays, short story, biography	Shawqi Daif (1910–2005)
2	Edward Albee (1928–2016)	United States	drama	Hanspeter Schelp (–)
3	Jorge Amado (1912–2001)	Brazil	novel, short story	Laurent Versini (1932–2021); Jean Subirats (–); Joracy Camargo (1898–1973); Antônio Olinto (1919–2009); Vitorino Nemésio (1901–1978)
4	Jerzy Andrzejewski (1909–1983)	Poland	novel, short story	Kristine Heltberg (1924–2003)
5	Louis Aragon (1897–1982)	France	novel, short story, poetry, essays	Michel Arrivé (1936–2017); Jean Gaudon (1926–2019); André-Marc Vial (1917–1987); Robert Ricatte (1913–1995)
6	Wystan Hugh Auden (1907–1973)	United Kingdom; United States	poetry, essays, screenplay	Francis Scarfe (1911–1986); Hermann Fischer (1932–2018); Douglas Grant (1921–1969)
7	Elisaveta Bagryana (1893–1991)	Bulgaria	poetry, translation	Anna Kamenova (1894–1982)
8	Agustí Bartra (1908–1982)	Spain	poetry, songwriting, translation	Manuel Durán (1925–2020)
9	Samuel Beckett (1906–1989)	Ireland	novel, drama, poetry	Helmut Kreuzer (1927–2004); Martin Price (1920–2010); Wolfgang Clemen (1909–1990); Jan Kott (1914–2001); Christopher Ricks (1933–)
10	Jorge Luis Borges (1899–1986)	Argentina	poetry, essays, translation, short story	Arnold Chapman (1902–1974); Helmut Kreuzer (1927–2004); Manuel Durán (1925–2020); Helen Gardner (1908–1986)
11	Emil Boyson (1897–1979)	Norway	poetry, novel, translation	Asbjørn Aarnes (1923–2013)
12	Heinrich Böll (1917–1985)	West Germany	novel, short story	Hans Schwerte (1909–1999); Karl Theodor Hyldgaard-Jensen (1917–1997); Herbert Morgan Waidson (1916–1988)
13	Michel Butor (1926–2016)	France	poetry, novel, essays, translation	Lars Gyllensten (1921–2006)
14	Elias Canetti (1905–1994)	Bulgaria; United Kingdom	novel, drama, memoir, essays	Keith Spalding (1913–2002)
15	Josep Carner (1884–1970)	Spain	poetry, drama, translation	Manuel Durán (1925–2020)
16	Jean Cassou (1897–1986)	France	novel, essays, literary criticism, poetry, translation	Giannēs Koutsocheras (1904–1994)
17	Paul Celan (1920–1970)	Romania; France	poetry, translation	Ernst Wilhelm Meyer (1892–1969); Dietrich Jöns (1924–2011); Gerhart Baumann (1920–2006); Heinz Politzer (1910–1978)
18	Aimé Césaire (1913–2008)	Martinique	poetry, drama, essays	Union of Finnish Writers
19	André Chamson (1900–1983)	France	novel, essays	Yves Gandon (1899–1975); French Centre – PEN International
20	René Char (1907–1988)	France	poetry	Henri Peyre (1901–1988)
21	Simone de Beauvoir (1908–1986)	France	novel, drama, memoir, philosophy, essays, short story	Henning Fenger (1921–1985)
22	Joseph Delteil (1894–1978)	France	poetry, novel, short story, essays	Charles Camproux (1908–1994)
23	Ivan Drach (1936–2018)	Soviet Union	poetry, literary criticism, drama	Omeljan Pritsak (1919–2006)
24	Carlos Drummond de Andrade (1902–1987)	Brazil	poetry, essays	Artur Lundkvist (1906–1991)
25	Lawrence Durrell (1912–1990)	United Kingdom	novel, short story, poetry, drama, essays	Haydn Trevor Mason (1929–2018)
26	Friedrich Dürrenmatt (1921–1990)	Switzerland	drama, novel, short story, essays	Ernst Wilhelm Meyer (1892–1969); Gustav Siebenmann (1923–2025); Werner Betz (1912–1980)
27	Rabbe Enckell (1903–1974)	Finland	short story, poetry	Carl Fredrik Sandelin (1925–)
28	José Maria Ferreira de Castro (1898–1978)	Portugal	novel	Joracy Camargo (1898–1973); Antônio Olinto (1919–2009); Vitorino Nemésio (1901–1978)
29	Edward Morgan Forster (1879–1970)	United Kingdom	novel, short story, drama, essays, biography, literary criticism	Ian Alexander (1911–1989); Leslie Poles Hartley (1895–1972)
30	Max Frisch (1911–1991)	Switzerland	novel, drama	John Stephenson Spink (1909–1985); Hans Fromm (1919–2008); Andri Peer (1921–1985)
31	Étienne Gilson (1884–1978)	France	philosophy	Pierre Courcelle (1912–1980)
32	Jean Giono (1895–1970)	France	novel, short story, essays, poetry, drama	Edmond Jarno (1905–1985)
33	Witold Gombrowicz (1904–1969)	Poland	short story, novel, drama	Jan Kott (1914–2001)
34	Günter Grass (1927–2015)	West Germany	novel, drama, poetry, essays	Hans Schwerte (1909–1999); Kauko Aatos Ojala (1919–1987); Hans Fromm (1919–2008); Henry Caraway Hatfield (1912–1995); Manfred Windfuhr (1930–)
35	Robert Graves (1895–1985)	United Kingdom	history, novel, poetry, literary criticism, essays	Beatrice White (1908–1995); Sigfrid Siwertz (1882–1970)
36	Graham Greene (1904–1991)	United Kingdom	novel, short story, autobiography, essays	Yves Le Hir (1919–2005)
37	Jorge Guillén (1893–1984)	Spain	poetry, literary criticism	Hans Staub (1931–2022); Jean Bruneau (1921–2001); Manuel Durán (1925–2020); Victor Brombert (1923–); Henri Peyre (1901–1988)
38	Louis Guilloux (1899–1980)	France	novel, short story, memoir	Jean-Bertrand Barrère (1914–1985)
39	Gunnar Gunnarsson (1889–1975)	Iceland	novel, short story, poetry	Johannes Brøndum-Nielsen (1881–1977); Þóroddur Guðmundsson (1904–1972)
40	Hồ Hữu Tường (1910–1980)	Vietnam	essays, short story, translation	Đông Hồ (1906–1969)
41	Vladimír Holan (1905–1980)	Czechoslovakia	poetry, essays	The Czech PEN-Club; Artur Lundkvist (1906–1991)
42	Taha Hussein (1889–1973)	Egypt	novel, short story, poetry, translation	Sheikh Mustafa Al-Amin (1889–1988); Abdel Hamid Gouda al-Sahhar (1913–1974)
43	Yasushi Inoue (1907–1991)	Japan	novel, poetry, short story, essays	Erich Ruprecht (1906–1997)
44	Eugène Ionesco (1909–1994)	Romania; France	drama, essays	Eyvind Johnson (1900–1976)
45	Jarosław Iwaszkiewicz (1894–1980)	Poland	poetry, essays, drama, translation, short story, novel	Józef Trypućko (1910–1983)
46	Mohammad-Ali Jamalzadeh (1892–1997)	Iran	short story, translation	Jes Peter Asmussen (1928–2002)
47	Eyvind Johnson (1900–1976)	Sweden	novel, short story	Pär Lagerkvist (1891–1974)
48	Marcel Jouhandeau (1888–1979)	France	short story, novel	Jean Gaulmier (1905–1997)
49	Pierre Jean Jouve (1887–1976)	France	poetry, novel, literary criticism	Henry Bouillier (1924–2014)
50	Bernhard Karlgren (1889–1978)	Sweden	history, philology, translation	Walter Fuchs (1914–1993)
51	Miroslav Krleža (1893–1981)	Yugoslavia	poetry, drama, short story, novel, essays	Mira Mihelič (1912–1985); Erih Koš (1913–2010); Marijan Matković (1915–1985); Grga Novak (1888–1978)
52	Karl Krolow (1915–1999)	West Germany	poetry, essays, translation	Emil Ernst Ploss (1925–1972)
53	Siegfried Lenz (1926–2014)	West Germany	novel, short story, essays, drama	Ernst Wilhelm Meyer (1892–1969)
54	Claude Lévi-Strauss (1908–2008)	Belgium; France	philosophy, essays	Jean Dubois (1920–2015); Gérard Emmanuel Weil (1926–1986)
55	Väinö Linna (1920–1992)	Finland	novel	Iiro Ilkka Kajanto (1925–1997)
56	Robert Lowell (1917–1977)	United States	poetry, translation	William Alfred (1922–1999)
57	Hugh MacLennan (1907–1990)	Canada	novel, essays	Lawrence Lande (1906–1998)
58	André Malraux (1901–1976)	France	novel, essays, literary criticism	Olov Janse (1892–1985); Émile Benveniste (1902–1976); Georges Matoré (1908–1998); André Lanly (1911–2007); Raymond Weil (1923–1995); Lloyd James Austin (1915–1994); Henry Caraway Hatfield (1912–1995); Henri Peyre (1901–1988)
59	Jacques Maritain (1882–1973)	France	philosophy	Charles Dédéyan (1910–2003)
60	Gustave Lucien Martin-Saint-René (1888–1973)	France	poetry, novel, essays, literary criticism, drama, songwriting, short story	Javier del Granado (1913–1996); René Spaeth (1890–1972); Henri Guiter (1909–1994)
61	Harry Martinson (1904–1978)	Sweden	poetry, novel, drama, essays	Arthur Arnholtz (1901–1973); Pär Lagerkvist (1891–1974)
62	László Mécs (1895–1978)	Hungary	poetry, essays	Watson Kirkconnell (1895–1977)
63	Arthur Miller (1915–2005)	United States	drama, screenplay, essays	Robert Ernest Spiller (1896–1988)
64	Vilhelm Moberg (1898–1973)	Sweden	novel, drama, history	Gunnar Tilander (1894–1973)
65	Eugenio Montale (1896–1981)	Italy	poetry, translation	Egon Huber (1907–1986); Paul Renucci (1915–1976); Frederick Jones (1925–2011); Elie Poulenard (1901–1985); Uberto Limentani (1913–1989)
66	Alberto Moravia (1907–1990)	Italy	novel, literary criticism, essays, drama	Jacques Robichez (1914–1999)
67	Vladimir Nabokov (1899–1977)	Russia; United States	novel, short story, poetry, drama, translation, literary criticism, memoir	Simon Karlinsky (1924–2009)
68	Pablo Neruda (1904–1973)	Chile	poetry	Noël Salomon (1917–1977); Einar Bragi (1921–2005); The Chilean PEN-Club
69	Germán Pardo García (1902–1991)	Colombia; Mexico	poetry	James Willis Robb (1918–2010)
70	José María Pemán (1897–1981)	Spain	poetry, drama, novel, essays, screenplay	Manuel Halcón (1900–1989); Francisco Sánchez-Castañer (1908–1981)
71	Robert Pinget (1919–1997)	France	novel, drama	Artur Lundkvist (1906–1991)
72	Ezra Pound (1885–1972)	United States	poetry, essays	Hans Galinsky (1909–1991)
73	Anthony Powell (1905–2000)	United Kingdom	novel, drama, essays, memoir	Jean Hamard (1920-2012).
74	Raymond Queneau (1903–1976)	France	novel, poetry, essays	T. van den Heuvel (–)
75	Jean Rateau-Landeville (1894–1972)	France	essays	Pierre Flottes (1895–1994)
76	Alain Robbe-Grillet (1922–2008)	France	novel, short story, essays, screenplays	Henry Olsson (1896–1985)
77	Gustave Roud (1897–1976)	Switzerland	poetry, translation	Henri Perrochon (1899–1990)
78	Hans Ruin (1891–1980)	Finland; Sweden	philosophy	Arthur Arnholtz (1901–1973)
79	Hannu Salama (1936–)	Finland	novel, short story, poetry	Osmo Hormia (1926–1983)
80	Nathalie Sarraute (1900–1999)	Russia; France	novel, drama, essays	Lars Gyllensten (1921–2006)
81	Anna Seghers (1900–1983)	East Germany	novel, short story	Heinz Kamnitzer (1917–2001)
82	Jaroslav Seifert (1901–1986)	Czechoslovakia	poetry, memoir, translation	Roman Jacobson (1896–1982)
83	Léopold Sédar Senghor (1906–2001)	Senegal	poetry, essays	Henri Peyre (1901–1988); Jacqueline Duchemin (1910–1988)
84	Ignazio Silone (1900–1978)	Italy	novel, short story, essays, drama	Arthur Ernest Gordon (1902–1989)
85	Claude Simon (1913–2005)	France	novel, essays	Eyvind Johnson (1900–1976)
86	Ton Smerdel (1904–1970)	Croatia	philology, poetry, essays, literary criticism, translation	Christiaan Alphonsus van den Berk (1919–1979)
87	Aleksandr Solzjenitsyn (1918–2008)	Soviet Union	novel, short story, essays	Denzel Carr (1900–1983); Yakov Malkiel (1914–1998); The Swedish PEN-Club
88	Zaharia Stancu (1902–1974)	Romania	poetry, novel, philosophy, essays	Alexandru Philippide (1900–1979); Șerban Cioculescu (1902–1988); Andrei Oțetea (1894–1977); George Ivașcu (1911–1988); Marin Preda (1922–1980); Virgil Teodorescu (1909–1987); Aurel Baranga (1913–1979); Ovid Crohmălniceanu (1921–2000); Dumitru Panaitescu-Perpessicius (1891–1971); Demostene Botez (1893–1973); George Macovescu (1913–2002)
89	Stijn Streuvels (1871–1969)	Belgium	novel, short story	Maurice Gilliams (1900–1982)
90	John Ronald Reuel Tolkien (1892–1973)	United Kingdom	novel, short story, poetry, philology, essays, literary criticism	Richard Ernest Wycherley (1909–1985)
91	Friedebert Tuglas (1886–1971)	Soviet Union	short story, literary criticism	Union of Finnish Writers
92	Pietro Ubaldi (1886–1972)	Italy	philosophy, essays	Academia Santista de Letras
93	Marie Under (1883–1980)	Estonia	poetry	Union of Finnish Writers
94	Giuseppe Ungaretti (1888–1970)	Italy	poetry, essays, literary criticism	Maria Bellonci (1902–1986); Egon Huber (1907–1986); Carlo Bo (1911–2001); Marco Scovazzi (1923–1971); Marcello Gigante (1923–2001); Gianfranco Contini (1912–1990); Oreste Macri (1913–1998); Piero Bigongiari (1914–1997); Giacomo Devoto (1897–1974); Lanfranco Caretti (1915–1995); Domenico De Robertis (1921–2011)
95	Tarjei Vesaas (1897–1970)	Norway	poetry, novel	Carl-Eric Thors (1920–1986); Erik Frykman (1905–1980); Karl-Hampus Dahlstedt (1917–1996); Bror Åkerblom (1908–1984); Sigmund Skard (1903–1995); Elie Poulenard (1901–1985); Harald Noreng (1913–2006); Odd Bang-Hansen (1908–1984)
96	Simon Vestdijk (1898–1971)	Netherlands	novel, poetry, essays, translation	Association of Literary Scholars, Critics, and Writers; Centre Neerlandais – PEN International; Harry Martinson (1904–1978)
97	Gerard Walschap (1898–1989)	Belgium	novel, drama, essays	Marcel Coole (1913–2000); Richard Declerck (1899–1986)
98	Mika Waltari (1908–1979)	Finland	short story, novel, poetry, drama, essays, screenplay	Esko Pennanen (1912–1990)
99	Arnold Wesker (1932–2016)	United Kingdom	drama, novel, essays	Claude Albert Mayer (1918–1998)
100	Patrick White (1912–1990)	Australia	novel, short story, drama, poetry, autobiography	Leslie Rees (1905–2000); Stanley Brogden (1913–2008)
101	Thornton Wilder (1897–1975)	United States	drama, novel, short story	Ernest Lee Tuveson (1915–1996); Robert Halsband (1914–1989)
102	Edmund Wilson (1895–1972)	United States	essays, literary criticism, short story, drama	Robert Brustein (1927–2023)
103	Carl Zuckmayer (1896–1977)	West Germany	drama, screenplay	Herbert Penzl (1910–1995); Karl Hoppe (1892–1973)

=== Prize decision ===
The decision to award Samuel Beckett was controversial within the Swedish Academy. While some members of the Nobel committee was enthusiastic about the idea of awarding Beckett, the Nobel committee chairman Anders Österling had serious doubts that Beckett's writing was in the spirit of Alfred Nobel's will. In 1964 he had argued that he "would almost consider a Nobel prize for him as an absurdity in his own style". Beckett was a leading candidate for the 1968 prize along with André Malraux, W.H. Auden and the Japanese writer Yasunari Kawabata, but was rejected in favour of Kawabata.

The Nobel committee, which in 1969 consisted of Anders Österling, Karl Ragnar Gierow, Lars Gyllensten, Eyvind Johnson, Artur Lundkvist and Henry Olsson, disagreed on the candidates to the extent that no jointly proposal could be presented to the Swedish Academy. Österling proposed André Malraux, with Graham Greene as his second proposal and Giuseppe Ungaretti (possibly shared with Eugenio Montale) as the third proposal. Johnson also proposed André Malraux, with Claude Simon as his second proposal and Patrick White as the third proposal. Gierow, Gyllensten, Lundkvist and Olsson jointly proposed Samuel Beckett, with Lundkvist adding the proposals Patrick White and Claude Simon. In his report Lundkvist opposed the candidacy of André Malraux, arguing that his major works was too far back in time and had lost some of its relevance. Lundkvist also regretted that the candidacies of the négritude-authors Aimé Césaire and Léopold Sédar Senghor had not been taken in consideration by the Nobel committee and recommended them for future consideration.

Despite Österling's reservations Beckett was awarded in 1969. The Nobel committee had received five nominations for Beckett that year, but was split as Österling and one other member supported a prize to André Malraux. Other nominations that year included Simone de Beauvoir, Jorge Luis Borges, Pablo Neruda and Graham Greene. While Österling acknowledged the possibility that behind Beckett's "depressing motives" might lie a "secret defence of humanity", he argued that in the eyes of most readers it "remains an artistically staged ghost poetry, characterised by a bottomless contempt for the human condition". Beckett's main supporter on the committee, Karl Ragnar Gierow, on the other hand, argued that Beckett's "black vision" was "not the expression of animosity and nihilism" but "portrays humanity as we have all seen it, at the moment of its most severe violation", and searches for the depths of degradation because even there, "there is the possibility of rehabilitation". Beckett was awarded and in his award ceremony speech Gierow expanded on his arguments, saying Beckett's work goes "to the depths" because "it is only there that pessimistic thought and poetry can work their miracles".

== Reactions ==
The awarding of the Nobel prize to Samuel Beckett was much noticed in the Irish press. The daily newspapers The Irish Times and The Irish Press both commented on it in editorials, and The Irish Independent recruited a literature professor from the University of Cork to comment on it. In The Irish Times Beckett was described as a literary innovator and a "Master of style in two languages" by writer Alec Reid. In France, the prize decision caused mixed reactions, The Irish Times reported. The Romanian-born playwright Eugene Ionesco said: "I am happy that Beckett has had this prize, because he deserve it." Marcel Archard, a member of the French Academy, said "I am wild with rage, the Swedish Academy has covered itself in ridicule and dishonoured itself through snobbism and the desire to be with-it. Now I understand why Sartre refused the Nobel Prize." Jean Chucenno, another member of the French Academy, said he would "personally have been happy had it been awarded to André Malraux." "However", he added, "the choice of Beckett is a very good choice."

At the time of the prize announcement on 23 October 1969 Beckett resorted in small fishing hamlet in Tunisia. Hearing the news that he had been awarded the Nobel prize, the reclusive Beckett booked another hotel room under a false name to avoid publicity. Beckett's French publisher told the Swedish Ministry for foreign affairs that Beckett refused to comment publicly, meet the press or let his whereabouts be known. Beckett however agreed to meet a team from Sveriges Television at a hotel in Nabeul, but under the premise "no questions". The short and uncommented clip showed a silent Beckett filmed at the hotel and some local surroundings.

In a letter correspondence with the permanent secretary of the Swedish Academy, Karl Ragnar Gierow, Beckett said that he was thankful for the honour, but that he would not come to Stockholm for the award ceremony, or be able to deliver a Nobel lecture. Beckett also declined an invitation from Gierow for a private lunch with the Academy, but that he hoped to meet Gierow in Paris at a later date.

While not rejecting the prize, Beckett did not attend the prize ceremony, nor did he deliver a Nobel lecture. His wife described his reaction to the news that he had been awarded the Nobel Prize in Literature as a "catastrophe". He quickly donated the prize money, much of it to Trinity College Dublin.

== Award ceremony ==
At the award ceremony in Stockholm on 10 December 1969, Karl Ragnar Gierow, permanent secretary of the Swedish Academy said:

the degradation of humanity is a recurrent theme in Beckett’s writing and to this extent, his philosophy, simply accentuated by elements of the grotesque and of tragic farce, can be described as a negativism that cannot desist from descending to the depths. To the depths it must go because it is only there that pessimistic thought and poetry can work their miracles. (...) [Beckett’s pessimism] houses a love of mankind that grows in understanding as it plumbs further into the depths of abhorrence, a despair that has to reach the utmost bounds of suffering to discover that compassion has no bounds. From that position, in the realms of annihilation, rises the writing of Samuel Beckett like a miserere from all mankind, its muffled minor key sounding liberation to the oppressed, and comfort to those in need.

Gierow ended his speech saying that the Swedish Academy regretted that Beckett was not present at the ceremony and that Beckett had chosen his French publisher Jérôme Lindon to accept the award on his behalf. Lindon then received the award from the King of Sweden.
