= 1970 Nobel Prize in Literature =

- Aleksandr Solzhenitsyn
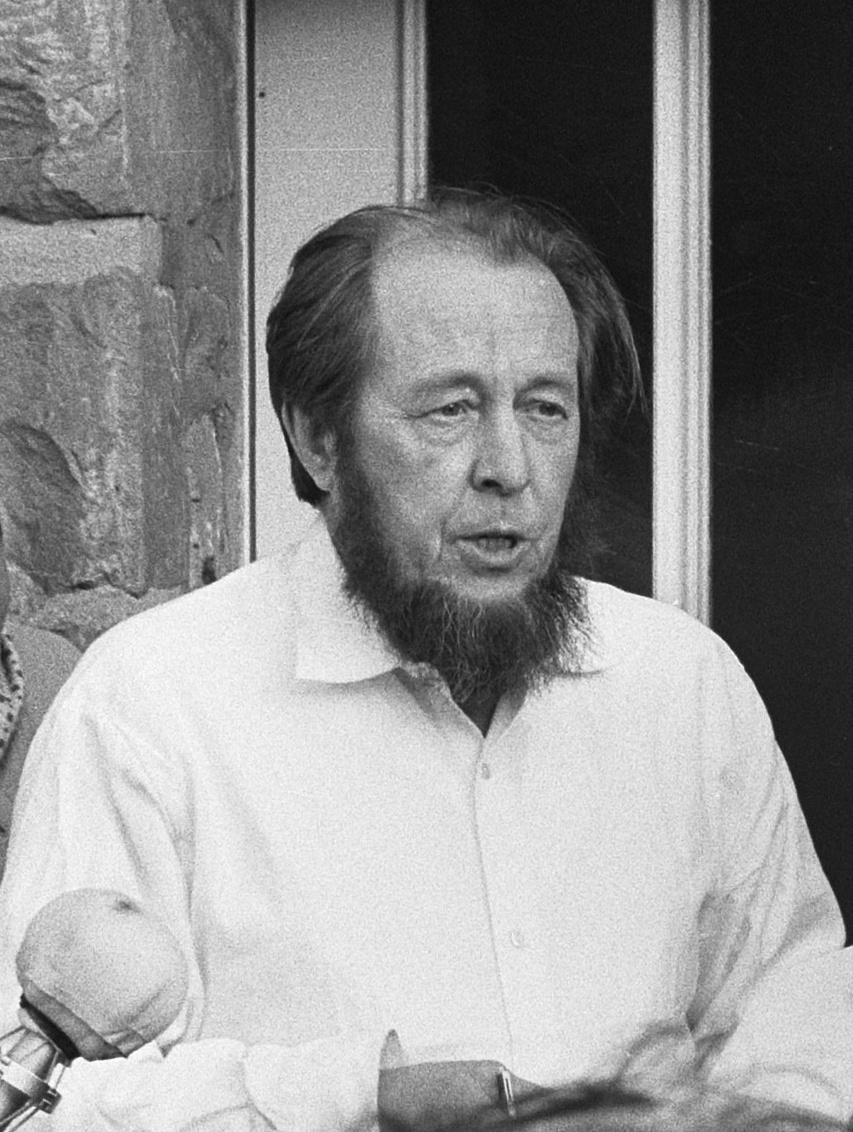
- "for the ethical force with which he has pursued the indispensable traditions of Russian literature."
- Date: 8 October 1970 (announcement); 10 December 1970 (ceremony)
- Location: Stockholm, Sweden
- Presented by: Swedish Academy
- First award: 1901
- Website: Official website

The 1970 Nobel Prize in Literature was awarded to the Soviet-Russian novelist Aleksandr Solzhenitsyn (1918–2008) "for the ethical force with which he has pursued the indispensable traditions of Russian literature." For political reasons he would not receive the prize until 1974. Solzhenitsyn is the fourth Russian recipient of the prize after Ivan Bunin in 1933, Boris Pasternak in 1958 and Mikhail Sholokhov in 1965.

== Laureate ==
Aleksandr Solzhenitsyn's works grew out of Russia's narrative traditions and reflect Soviet society. His debut, Odin den' Ivana Denisovicha ("One Day in the Life of Ivan Denisovich", 1962), and several of his later works, focus on life in the Soviet gulag camps. Solzhenitsyn's books often lack an obvious main character, moving instead between different characters at the center of the plot. This reflects a humanist view of the universality of human experience. Among his famous literary works include Rakovyi korpus ("Cancer Ward", 1966), V kruge pervom ("The First Circle", 1968), Avgust chetyrnadtsatogo ("August 1914", 1971), and Arkhipelag Gulag ("The Gulag Archipelago", 1973).

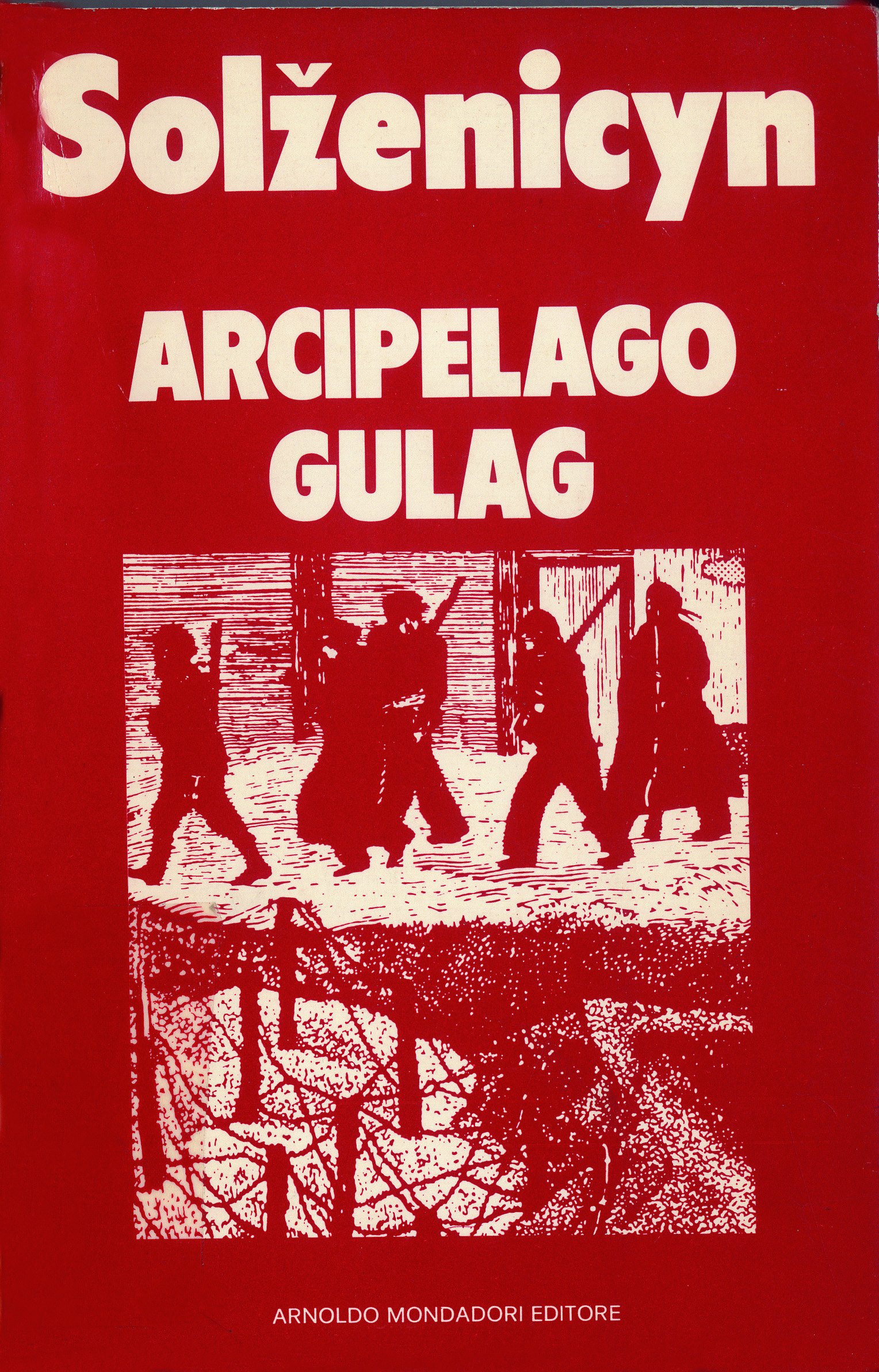
Solzhenitsyn's masterpiece The Gulag Archipelago was published after he received the Nobel Prize.

== Deliberations ==
=== Nominations ===
In total, the Swedish academy received 128 nominations for 77 writers. Solzhenitsyn received 9 nominations starting in 1969 before being awarded the 1970 prize. He received 6 nominations in 1970.

Nominees included were Patrick White (awarded in 1973), Pablo Neruda (awarded in 1971), Heinrich Böll (awarded in 1972), Jorge Luis Borges and Tarjei Vesaas. 25 of the nominees were nominated first-time, among them Paavo Haavikko, Denis de Rougemont, Heðin Brú, Sei Itō, Tatsuzō Ishikawa, Hugo Bergmann, Alexander Lernet-Holenia, Fazıl Hüsnü Dağlarca, Amado Yuzon, Abraham Sutzkever and Mikhail Naimy. Repeated nominees included W. H. Auden, Jorge Amado, Graham Greene, André Malraux, Alberto Moravia, Vladimir Nabokov and Simon Vestdijk. The highest number of nominations were for the Norwegian novelist and poet, Tarjei Vesaas, with 9 nominations. Two of the nominees were women: Marie Under and Victoria Ocampo. The oldest nominee was Scottish writer Compton Mackenzie (aged 87) while the youngest was Finnish author Paavo Haavikko (aged 39). Japanese author Sei Itō and Korean writer Yi Gwangsu were nominated posthumously.

The authors Arthur Adamov, Antonio Abad, Louise Bogan, Vera Brittain, Rudolf Carnap, Fernand Crommelynck, Christopher Dawson, John Dos Passos, Leah Goldberg, Amado V. Hernandez, Richard Hofstadter, Roman Ingarden, B. H. Liddell Hart, John O'Hara, Charles Olson, Orhan Kemal, Máirtín Ó Cadhain, Alf Prøysen, Salvador Reyes Figueroa, Wilbur Daniel Steele, Elsa Triolet, and Fritz von Unruh died in 1970 without having been nominated for the prize. The Norwegian poet Tarjei Vesaas, Catalan writer Josep Carner, Italian poet Giuseppe Ungaretti died months before the announcement.

Official list of nominees and their nominators for the prize
No.	Nominee	Country	Genre(s)	Nominator(s)
1	Jorge Amado (1912–2001)	Brazil	novel, short story	Marcos Almir Madeira (1916–2003); Antônio Olinto (1919–2009)
2	Jerzy Andrzejewski (1909–1983)	Poland	novel, short story	Timo Tiusanen (1936–1985)
3	Wystan Hugh Auden (1907–1973)	United Kingdom; United States	poetry, essays, screenplay	Paul Goetsch (1934–2018); Barbara Hardy (1924–2016)
4	Riccardo Bacchelli (1891–1985)	Italy	novel, drama, essays	Giacomo Devoto (1897–1974); Beniamino Segre (1903–1977)
5	Eugen Barbu (1923–1993)	Romania	novel, short story, screenplay	Alexandru Rosetti (1895–1990)
6	Agustí Bartra (1908–1982)	Spain	poetry, songwriting, translation	Manuel Durán (1925–2020)
7	Hugo Bergmann (1883–1975)	Czechoslovakia; Israel	philosophy	André Neher (1914–1988)
8	Jorge Luis Borges (1899–1986)	Argentina	poetry, essays, translation, short story	Arthur Ernest Gordon (1902–1989); Helen Gardner (1908–1986); Manuel Durán (1925–2020); Edward Hetsel Schafer (1913–1991); Heinrich Bihler (1918–2017)
9	Heinrich Böll (1917–1985)	West Germany	novel, short story	Karl Theodor Hyldgaard-Jensen (1917–1995); Gustav Korlén (1915–2014); Henry Olsson (1896–1985)
10	Heðin Brú (1901–1987)	Faroe Islands	novel, short story, translation	Ólavur Michelsen (1933–1978)
11	Josep Carner (1884–1970)	Spain	poetry, drama, translation	Ramon Aramon i Serra (1907–2000); Émilie Noulet (1892–1978); Jordi Rubió (1887–1982)
12	Aimé Césaire (1913–2008)	Martinique	poetry, drama, essays	Artur Lundkvist (1906–1991)
13	André Chamson (1900–1983)	France	novel, essays	Yves Gandon (1899–1975); Élie Bachas (1903–1986); Armand Lunel (1892–1977)
14	Fazıl Hüsnü Dağlarca (1914–2008)	Turkey	poetry	Herbert Howarth (1900–1971); Yaşar Nabi Nayır (1908–1981)
15	Denis de Rougemont (1906–1985)	Switzerland	philosophy, essays	Jean-Théodore Brutsch (1898–1973)
16	Youssef Durra al-Haddad (1913–1979)	Lebanon	essays, theology	Fouad Boustany (1904–1994)
17	Friedrich Dürrenmatt (1921–1990)	Switzerland	drama, novel, short story, essays	Werner Betz (1912–1980); Karl Siegfried Guthke (1933–)
18	Rabbe Enckell (1903–1974)	Finland	short story, poetry	Carl Fredrik Sandelin (1925–2024); Karl Robert Villehad Wikman (1886–1975)
19	Salvador Espriu (1913–1985)	Spain	drama, novel, poetry	Antoni Comas (1931–1981); Heinrich Bihler (1918–2017)
20	José Maria Ferreira de Castro (1898–1978)	Portugal	novel	Antônio Olinto (1919–2009)
21	Max Frisch (1911–1991)	Switzerland	novel, drama	John Stephenson Spink (1909–1985)
22	Robert Ganzo (1898–1995)	Venezuela; France	poetry, translation, history, essays, drama, biography	André Lebois (1915–1978)
23	Günter Grass (1927–2015)	West Germany	novel, drama, poetry, essays	Manfred Windfuhr (1930–)
24	Graham Greene (1904–1991)	United Kingdom	novel, short story, autobiography, essays	Mary Renault (1905–1983); Esko Pennanen (1912–1990)
25	Jorge Guillén (1893–1984)	Spain	poetry, literary criticism	Manuel Durán (1925–2020)
26	Paavo Haavikko (1931–2008)	Finland	poetry, drama, essays	Timo Tiusanen (1936–1985)
27	William Heinesen (1900–1991)	Faroe Islands	poetry, short story, novel	Harald Noreng (1913–2006)
28	Vladimír Holan (1905–1980)	Czechoslovakia	poetry, essays	Adolf Hoffmeister (1902–1973)
29	Eugène Ionesco (1909–1994)	Romania; France	drama, essays	Louis Alexander MacKay (1901–1982)
30	Tatsuzō Ishikawa (1905–1985)	Japan	novel, essays	Kojiro Serizawa (1897–1993)
31	Sei Itō (1905–1969) (posthumous nomination)	Japan	poetry, essays, novel, short story, translation	Kojiro Serizawa (1897–1993)
32	Eyvind Johnson (1900–1976)	Sweden	novel, short story	Pär Lagerkvist (1891–1974); Henry Olsson (1896–1985)
33	Erich Kästner (1899–1974)	West Germany	poetry, screenplay, autobiography	Gerd Høst-Heyerdahl (1915–2007)
34	Miroslav Krleža (1893–1981)	Croatia; Yugoslavia	poetry, drama, short story, novel, essays	Jara Ribnikar (1912–2007); Marijan Matković (1915–1985)
35	Siegfried Lenz (1926–2014)	West Germany	novel, short story, essays, drama	Johannes Edfelt (1904–1997)
36	Alexander Lernet-Holenia (1897–1976)	Austria	poetry, novel, drama, screenplay	Hilde Spiel (1911–1990)
37	Saunders Lewis (1893–1985)	United Kingdom	poetry, essays, history, literary criticism	John Ellis Caerwyn Williams (1912–1999)
38	Lin Yutang (1895–1976)	China	novel, philosophy, essays, translation	Executive Committee of the Chinese Center – International PEN
39	Compton Mackenzie (1883–1972)	United Kingdom	novel, short story, drama, poetry, history, biography, essays, literary criticism, memoir	Norman Jeffares (1920–2005)
40	Hugh MacLennan (1907–1990)	Canada	novel, essays	Lawrence Lande (1906–1998)
41	Harold Macmillan (1894–1986)	United Kingdom	history, essays, memoir	Carl Becker (1925–1973)
42	André Malraux (1901–1976)	France	novel, essays, literary criticism	Aimo Sakari (1911–2001); Eyvind Johnson (1900–1976); Ernest Lee Tuveson (1915–1996); John Henry Raleigh (1920–2001); Pierre Grappin (1915–1997); Jean Bourrilly (1911–1971)
43	Harry Martinson (1904–1978)	Sweden	poetry, novel, drama, essays	Pär Lagerkvist (1891–1974); Henry Olsson (1896–1985); Arthur Arnholtz (1901–1973)
44	László Mécs (1895–1978)	Hungary	poetry, essays	Watson Kirkconnell (1895–1977)
45	Vilhelm Moberg (1898–1973)	Sweden	novel, drama, history	Harald Noreng (1913–2006)
46	Eugenio Montale (1896–1981)	Italy	poetry, translation	Uberto Limentani (1913–1989)
47	Alberto Moravia (1907–1990)	Italy	novel, literary criticism, essays, drama	Jacques Robichez (1914–1999)
48	Vladimir Nabokov (1899–1977)	Russia; United States	novel, short story, poetry, drama, translation, literary criticism, memoir	Bernard Tervoort (1920–2006)
49	Mikhail Naimy (1889–1988)	Lebanon	poetry, drama, short story, novel, autobiography, literary criticism	Toufic Fahd (1923–2009)
50	Pablo Neruda (1904–1973)	Chile	poetry	Josephine Miles (1911–1985); Artur Lundkvist (1906–1991)
51	Victoria Ocampo (1890–1979)	Argentina	essays, literary criticism, biography	Miguel Alfredo Olivera (1922–2008)
52	Emilio Oribe (1893–1975)	Uruguay	poetry, essays, philosophy	Sarah Bollo (1904–1987)
53	Germán Pardo García (1902–1991)	Colombia; Mexico	poetry	Kurt Leopold Levy (1917–2000)
54	Pandelis Prevelakis (1909–1986)	Greece	novel, poetry, drama, essays	Kariophilēs Mētsakēs (1932–2013)
55	Evaristo Ribera Chevremont (1890–1976)	Puerto Rico	poetry	Ernesto Juan Fonfrías (1909–1990)
56	Hans Ruin (1891–1980)	Finland; Sweden	philosophy	Arthur Arnholtz (1901–1973)
57	Léopold Sédar Senghor (1906–2001)	Senegal	poetry, essays	Artur Lundkvist (1906–1991)
58	Georges Simenon (1903–1989)	Belgium	novel, short story, memoir	Richard Alewyn (1902–1979)
59	Claude Simon (1913–2005)	France	novel, essays	Eyvind Johnson (1900–1976); Lars Gyllensten (1921–2006)
60	Charles Percy Snow (1905–1980)	United Kingdom	novel, essays	Sylvère Monod (1921–2006)
61	Aleksandr Solzjenitsyn (1918–2008)	Soviet Union	novel, short story, essays	Magnus von Platen (1920–2002); Per Wästberg (1933–); Yakov Malkiel (1914–1998); Walther Hinz (1906–1992); Max Rouché (1902–1985); Jacques Proust (1926–2005)
62	Abraham Sutzkever (1913–2010)	Belarus; Israel	poetry	Joseph Leftwich (1892–1984)
63	Friedebert Tuglas (1886–1971)	Estonia	short story, literary criticism	Lassi Nummi (1928–2012)
64	Marie Under (1883–1980)	Estonia	poetry	Lassi Nummi (1928–2012)
65	Giuseppe Ungaretti (1888–1970)	Italy	poetry, essays, literary criticism	Marco Scovazzi (1923–1971)
66	Lluís Valeri i Sahís (1891–1971)	Spain	poetry	Antoni Griera y Gaja (1887–1973)
67	Tarjei Vesaas (1897–1970)	Norway	poetry, novel	Pekka Lappalainen (1925–1981); Erik Frykman (1905–1980); Harry Sandbach (1903–1991); Carl-Eric Thors (1920–1986); Kauko Aatos Ojala (1919–1987); Bror Åkerblom (1908–1984); Sigmund Skard (1903–1995); Odd Bang-Hansen (1908–1984); Harald Noreng (1913–2006)
68	Simon Vestdijk (1898–1971)	Netherlands	novel, poetry, essays, translation	Simon Koster (1900–1989); Dirk de Jong (1910–1974); Jacoba Eggink (1914–1997); Jan Kamerbeek Jr. (1905–1977); Nel Boer-den Hoed (1899–1973); Adriaan Prins (1921–2000)
69	Gerard Walschap (1898–1989)	Belgium	novel, drama, essays	William Pée (1903–1986); Maurice Gilliams (1900–1982)
70	Frank Waters (1902–1995)	United States	novel, essays, memoir, biography	Thomas Lyon (1937–)
71	Sándor Weöres (1913–1989)	Hungary	poetry, translation	Áron Kibédi Varga (1930–2018)
72	Patrick White (1912–1990)	Australia	novel, short story, drama, poetry, autobiography	Hesba Fay Brinsmead (1922–2003); Leslie Rees (1905–2000); Harold Leslie Rogers (1925–1990); Gerald Wilkes (1927–2020); Muriel Clara Bradbrook (1909–1993); Artur Lundkvist (1906–1991)
73	Thornton Wilder (1897–1975)	United States	drama, novel, short story	Charles Bracelen Flood (1930–2014); Peter Wapnewski (1922–2012)
74	Edmund Wilson (1895–1972)	United States	essays, literary criticism, short story, drama	Robert Brustein (1927–2023)
75	Yi Gwangsu (1892–1950) (posthumous nomination)	South Korea	novel, short story	Baek Cheol (1908–1985)
76	Amado Yuzon (1906–1979)	Philippines	poetry, essays	Zhong Dingwen (1914–2012); Emeterio Barcelon Barcelo-Soriano (1897-1978)
77	Carl Zuckmayer (1896–1977)	West Germany	drama, screenplay	Herbert Penzl (1910–1995)

=== Prize decision ===
Alexander Solzhenitsyn had been considered for the prize the previous year. In 1970, five of the six members of the Swedish Academy's Nobel committee supported the proposal that Solzhenitsyn should be awarded the prize. Committee member Artur Lundkvist however opposed a prize to Solzhenitsyn. Lundkvist questioned the artistic value of Solzhenitsyn's work and argued that the Nobel prize in literature should not be a political prize. Lundkvist proposed that the prize for 1970 should be awarded to Pablo Neruda, with Patrick White as his second proposal. Lundkvist argued that "If it is at all possible to compare a poet and an epic writer (...) it appears obvious to me that Solzhenitzyn's work from an artistic perspective can not be mentioned next to Neruda's. Neither does his work stand such a comparison to Patrick White's."

All the other members of the Nobel committee agreed on Solzhenitsyn as the first proposal. Committee member Lars Gyllensten concluded that Solzhenitsyn "with a quantitatively rather small output appears as an impressively richly equipped, complicated and independently conscious author with a rare versatile material and unusual psychological ability of portrayal." The committee had also received several proposals from outside the Swedish Academy that Solzhenitsyn should be awarded the Nobel prize in literature, one such proposal came from the 1952 laureate Francois Mauriac and a number of other prominent French authors and cultural persons. While a majority of the members of the Nobel committee acknowledged that Solzhenitsyn was worthy of the prize, the committee was worried about how the authorities in the Soviet Union would react if Solzhenitsyn was awarded. For this reason the committee presented an alternative proposal with Patrick White and W.H. Auden as the main candidates weeks before the final vote, should it be known that Solzhenitsyn's life was in danger. On the final vote on 8 October 1970 Solzhenitsyn got the majority of the delivered votes from the members of the Swedish Academy.

Another shortlisted candidate for the 1970 prize was André Malraux, who was listed as the second proposal after Solzhentizyn by Nobel committee members Eyvind Johnson and Anders Österling. In a report dated 27 May 1970, Karl Ragnar Gierow said that Malraux was "undeniably worthy of the Nobel prize", if one could overlook what Malraux had achieved and not achieved in recent years. But Gierow argued that Malraux's best work was too far back in time, and the fact that Malraux now was a member of the French government further made it difficult for the Swedish Academy to award him. Gierow also noted that the Nobel committee's dismissal of Graham Greene's long standing candidacy in 1970 was likely to mean that the committee would not further consider Greene as a candidate for the prize, unless Greene returned with works of the same standard as his most acclaimed works of the past.

== Reaction and controversy ==
In 1969, Solzhenitsyn was expelled from the Russian Union of Writers. The following year, he was awarded the Nobel Prize in Literature, which he intentionally did not attend for fear that the USSR would prevent his return afterwards (his works there were circulated in samizdat—clandestine form). After the Swedish government refused to honor Solzhenitsyn with a public award ceremony and lecture at its Moscow embassy, Solzhenitsyn refused the award altogether, commenting that the conditions set by the Swedes (who preferred a private ceremony) were "an insult to the Nobel Prize itself." Solzhenitsyn did not accept the award and prize money until 10 December 1974, after he was deported from the Soviet Union. Within the Swedish Academy, member Artur Lundkvist had argued that the Nobel Prize in Literature should not become a political prize and questioned the artistic value of Solzhenitsyn's work.

Harassed by the Communist party and the KGB, Solzhenitsyn was fearful that if he went to Stockholm to accept the Nobel medal and diploma, he would be stripped of his Soviet citizenship and prevented from coming home. Plans were arranged for the Swedish Academy's permanent secretary, Karl Ragnar Gierow, to give him the award in a Moscow apartment. But when Gierow was refused a Russian visa, Solzhenitsyn expressed his anger in an open letter he released to the press, asking the Swedish Academy to "keep the Nobel insignia for an indefinite period... If I do not live long enough myself, I bequeath the task of receiving them to my son."

In the western world the prize decision was generally positively received. Les Lettres Françaises stated that "The choice of Alexander Solzhenitsyn justifies the existence of the Nobel Prize in Literature".

== Award ceremony ==
At the award ceremony in Stockholm City Hall on 10 December 1970, the permanent secretary of the Swedish Academy Karl Ragnar Gierow said:

"A message about special circumstances seldom travels far and the words that fly round the world are those which appeal to, and help us, all. Such are the words of Alexander Solzhenitsyn. They speak to us of matters that we need to hear more than ever before, of the individual's indestructible dignity. Wherever that dignity is violated, whatever the reason or the means, his message is not only an accusation but also an assurance: those who commit such a violation are the only ones to be degraded by it. The truth of this is plain to see wherever one travels. Even the external form which Solzhenitsyn seeks for his work bears witness to his message. This form has been termed the polyphone or horizontal novel. It might equally be described as a story with no chief character. Which is to say that this is not individualism at the expense of the surroundings. But nor may the gallery of persons act as a collective that smothers the individuals of which it is entirely composed. Solzhenitsyn has explained what he means by polyphonism: each person becomes the chief character whenever the action concerns him. This is not just a technique, it is a creed. The narrative focuses on the only human element in existence, the human individual, with equal status among equals, one destiny among millions and a million destinies in one. This is the whole of humanism in a nutshell, for the kernel is love of mankind. This year's Nobel Prize for Literature has been awarded to the proclaimer of such a humanism."

Solzhenitsyn could not receive the award until four years later. Presenting him the award, Gierow said at the award ceremony on 10 December 1974 :

"Not only for the Swedish Academy but for all of us the ceremony today has a particular significance: we can, finally, hand over to the laureate of 1970 the insignia of his award. Mr Alexander Solzhenitsyn: I have already made two speeches to you. The first one you couldn't listen to, because there was a frontier to cross. The second one I couldn't deliver, because there was a frontier to cross. Your presence here today doesn't mean that the frontiers have at last been abolished. On the contrary, it means that you are now on this side of a border that still exists. But the spirit of your writings, as I understand it, the driving force of your work, like the spirit and force of Alfred Nobel's last will and testament, is to open all frontiers, to enable man to meet man, freely and confidently."

Solzhenitsyn's visit to Stockholm and his presence at the award ceremony in 1974 was much noticed in the Swedish press.

== Nobel lecture ==
Alexander Solzhenitsyn delivered his Nobel lecture at the Swedish Academy on 7 December 1974.
