= 1972 Nobel Prize in Literature =

- Heinrich Böll
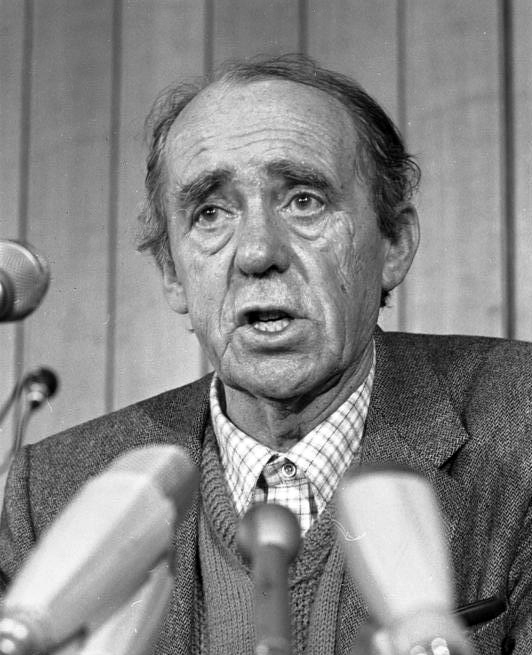
- "for his writing which through its combination of a broad perspective on his time and a sensitive skill in characterization has contributed to a renewal of German literature."
- Date: 19 October 1972 (announcement); 10 December 1972 (ceremony)
- Location: Stockholm, Sweden
- Presented by: Swedish Academy
- First award: 1901
- Website: Official website

The 1972 Nobel Prize in Literature was awarded to the German author Heinrich Böll (1917–1985) "for his writing which through its combination of a broad perspective on his time and a sensitive skill in characterization has contributed to a renewal of German literature." Böll is the fifth German author to be recipient of the prize. (Note: Heinrich Böll is the first German citizen to be awarded the Nobel Prize for Literature since Thomas Mann won it in 1929. Hermann Hesse, born in Germany, was a Swiss citizen when he won the prize in 1946. The late poet Nelly Sachs, who was born in Germany and wrote in German, was honored in 1966, but she was a Swedish subject.)

== Laureate ==
The events of World War II had a significant influence on Heinrich Böll's literature. In his debut novel Der Zug war pünktlich ("The Train Was on Time", 1949) and the short story collection Wanderer, kommst du nach Spa... ("Stranger, Bear Word to the Spartans We...", 1950), he illustrated the folly of war and the pain it causes. Böll published a number of books that critiqued West German society after World War II, such as Gruppenbild mit Dame ("Group Portrait with Lady", 1971). Among his best-known works include Und sagte kein einziges Wort ("And Never Said a Word", 1953), Ansichten eines Clowns ("The Clowns", 1963), and Die verlorene Ehre der Katharina Blum ("The Lost Honour of Katharina Blum", 1974).

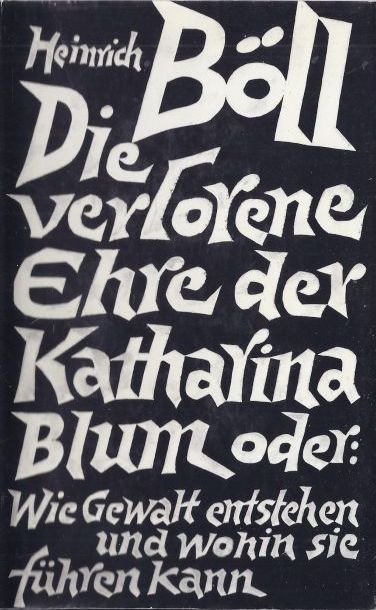
Böll's 1974 novel The Lost Honour of Katharina Blum

== Deliberations ==
=== Nominations ===
In 1972, the Swedish Academy received 158 nominations for 100 writers. Böll started earning nominations for the Nobel Prize in Literature since 1960. In total, he received 29 nominations with the highest number in 1972 which eventually led to his awarding.

Twenty-seven authors were newly nominated such as Philip Roth, Norman Mailer, Bernard Malamud, Nadine Gordimer (awarded in 1991), V. S. Naipaul (awarded in 2001), Francis Stuart, Doris Lessing (awarded in 2007), Alan Paton, Astrid Lindgren, Anthony Burgess, and Sri Chinmoy. The most number of nominations was for the British-American poet W. H. Auden with 10 nominations. The oldest nominee was Compton Mackenzie (aged 89) and the youngest was Philip Roth (aged 39). The Polish-born American poet Jacob Glatstein and Indian novelist Tarasankar Bandyopadhyay were nominated posthumously by Moshe Starkman (1906–1975) and the Academy's Nobel Committee respectively. Five of the nominees were women namely Nadine Gordimer, Doris Lessing, Astrid Lindgren, Anna Seghers, and Marie Under.

The authors Natalie Clifford Barney, John Berryman, Victor Bridges, Fredric Brown, Américo Castro, Michał Choromański, Richard Church, Cecil Day-Lewis, R. F. Delderfield, Jacques Deval, Robert Faesi, Abraham Joshua Heschel, Ernestine Hill, Helen Hoyt, Vera Inber, Norah Lange, Violette Leduc, Laurence Manning, José Nucete Sardi, Kenneth Patchen, Betty Smith, Edgar Snow, Violet Trefusis, Mark Van Doren, and Ivan Yefremov died in 1972 without having been nominated for the prize.

Official list of nominees and their nominators for the prize
No.	Nominee	Country	Genre(s)	Nominator(s)
1	Said Akl (1911–2014)	Lebanon	poetry, philosophy, drama	Association of Cultural Clubs in Lebanon
2	Tawfiq al-Hakim (1898–1987)	Egypt	novel, drama, essays, short story, biography	Ibrāhīm Madkūr (1902–1995); Ḥusnī Farīz (1907–1990)
3	Edward Albee (1928–2016)	United States	drama	Dieter Schaller (1929–2003)
4	Jorge Amado (1912–2001)	Brazil	novel, short story	Marcos Almir Madeira (1916–2003)
5	Louis Aragon (1897–1982)	France	novel, short story, poetry, essays	Jean Gaudon (1926–2019)
6	Wystan Hugh Auden (1907–1973)	United Kingdom; United States	poetry, essays, screenplay	Hans Bielenstein (1920–2015); Thomas Fleming (1927–2017); Charles Bracelen Flood (1930–2014); Paul Goestch (1934–2018); Richard M. Goodwin (1913–1996); Samuel Johnson (1919–2005); Jónas Kristjánsson (1924–2014); Victor Sawdon Pritchett (1900–1997); Denis de Rougemont (1906–1985); Walter Weiss (born 1942)
7	Riccardo Bacchelli (1891–1985)	Italy	novel, drama, essays	Beniamino Segre (1903–1977)
8	Tarasankar Bandyopadhyay (1898–1971) (posthumous nomination)	India	novel, short story, drama, essays, autobiography, songwriting	Nobel Committee
9	Saul Bellow (1915–2005)	Canada; United States	novel, short story, memoir, essays	Elsie Patton (?)
10	Louis Paul Boon (1912–1979)	Belgium	novel, essays, short story, poetry	Renaat Declerck (born 1949); Carel Jules Emile Dinaux (1898–1980)
11	Jorge Luis Borges (1899–1986)	Argentina	poetry, essays, translation, short story	Kurt Leopold Levy (1917–2000); Raimundo Lida (1908–1979)
12	Luis Buñuel (1900–1983)	Spain	screenplay	Lars Forssell (1928–2007)
13	Anthony Burgess (1917–1993)	United Kingdom	novel, poetry, drama, screenplay, autobiography, biography, essays, literary criticism, translation	Artur Lundkvist (1906–1991)
14	Heinrich Böll (1917–1985)	West Germany	novel, short story	Manfred Durzak (born 1938); Karl Hyldgaard-Jensen (1917–1995); Gustav Korlén (1915–2014); Hans Mayer (1907–2001); Gerhard Nickel (1928–2015); Marcel Reich-Ranicki (1920–2013); Herbert Morgan Waidson (1916–1988); Leevi Valkama (1915–2000)
15	Michel Butor (1926–2016)	France	poetry, novel, essays, translation	Leon Samuel Roudiez (1917–2004)
16	Elias Canetti (1905–1994)	Bulgaria; United Kingdom	novel, drama, memoir, essays	Keith Spalding (1913–2002)
17	Aimé Césaire (1913–2008)	Martinique	poetry, drama, essays	Lassi Nummi (1928–2012)
18	André Chamson (1900–1983)	France	novel, essays	Giannēs Koutsocheras (1904–1994); Yves Gandon (1899–1975); Armand Lunel (1892–1977); Jean Mistler (1897–1988); Charles Rostaing (1904–1999)
19	René Char (1907–1988)	France	poetry	Henri Peyre (1901–1988)
20	Suniti Kumar Chatterji (1890–1977)	India	essays, pedagogy, literary criticism	Pratul Chandra Gupta (1910–1990)
21	Sri Chinmoy (1931–2007)	India; United States	poetry, drama, short story, essays, songwriting	Bernard O'Kelly (1927–2005); Norman Holmes Pearson (1909–1975)
22	Austin Clarke (1896–1974)	Ireland	poetry, drama, novel, memoirs	Kenneth Deale (1907–1974); Desmond Clarke (1907–1979)
23	Fazıl Hüsnü Dağlarca (1914–2008)	Turkey	poetry	Yaşar Nabi Nayır (1908–1981)
24	Denis de Rougemont (1906–1985)	Switzerland	philosophy, essays	Suzanne Deriex (born 1926)
25	Friedrich Dürrenmatt (1921–1990)	Switzerland	drama, novel, short story, essays	Werner Betz (1912–1980); Herbert Penzl (1910–1995); Kázmér Géza Werner (1900–1985); Elisabet Hermodsson (1927–2017)
26	Odysseas Elytis (1911–1996)	Greece	poetry, essays, translation	Artur Lundkvist (1906–1991)
27	Rabbe Enckell (1903–1974)	Finland	short story, poetry	Eeva Kilpi (born 1928); Carl-Eric Thors (1920–1986)
28	Salvador Espriu (1913–1985)	Spain	drama, novel, poetry	Antoni Comas i Pujol (1931–1981)
29	Max Frisch (1911–1991)	Switzerland	novel, drama	Elisabet Hermodsson (1927–2017)
30	Romain Gary (1914–1980)	Lithuania; France	novel, essays, literary criticism, screenplay	Walther Hinz (1906–1992)
31	Jacob Glatstein (1896–1971) (posthumous nomination)	Poland; United States	poetry, essays, literary criticism	Moshe Starkman (1906–1975)
32	William Golding (1911–1993)	United Kingdom	novel, poetry, drama, essays	Nobel Committee
33	Nadine Gordimer (1923–2014)	South Africa	novel, short story, essay, drama	Artur Lundkvist (1906–1991)
34	Julien Gracq (1910–2007)	France	novel, drama, poetry, essays	Georges Matoré (1908–1998)
35	Günter Grass (1927–2015)	West Germany	novel, drama, poetry, essays	Henry Caraway Hatfield (1912–1995); Emil Ernst Ploss (1925–1972); Manfred Windfuhr (born 1930)
36	Julien Green (1900–1998)	France	novel, autobiography, essays	Johannes Edfelt (1904–1997)
37	Graham Greene (1904–1991)	United Kingdom	novel, short story, autobiography, essays	Heinrich Böll (1917–1985); Mary Renault (1905–1983)
38	Paavo Haavikko (1931–2008)	Finland	poetry, drama, essays	Lassi Nummi (1928–2012)
39	William Heinesen (1900–1991)	Faroe Islands	poetry, short story, novel	Harald Noreng (1913–2006)
40	Joseph Heller (1923–1999)	United States	novel, short story, drama, screenplay	Artur Lundkvist (1906–1991)
41	Vladimír Holan (1905–1980)	Czechoslovakia	poetry, essays	Nobel Committee
42	Taha Hussein (1889–1973)	Egypt	novel, short story, poetry, translation	Ibrāhīm Madkūr (1902–1995)
43	Gyula Illyés (1902–1983)	Hungary	poetry, novel, drama, essays	Lars Gyllensten (1921–2006); Artur Lundkvist (1906–1991)
44	Eugène Ionesco (1909–1994)	Romania; France	drama, essays	Johannes Söderlind (1918–2001)
45	Roman Jakobson (1896–1982)	Russia; United States	essays	Jean Dubois (1920–2015)
46	Eyvind Johnson (1900–1976)	Sweden	novel, short story	Pär Lagerkvist (1891–1974)
47	Ferenc Juhász (1928–2015)	Hungary	poetry	Artur Lundkvist (1906–1991)
48	Erich Kästner (1899–1974)	West Germany	poetry, screenplay, autobiography	Johann Maier (1933–2019)
49	Miroslav Krleža (1893–1981)	Croatia; Yugoslavia	poetry, drama, short story, novel, essays	Nobel Committee
50	Manbohdan Lal (?)	India		Udai Narain Tewari (?)
51	Philip Larkin (1922–1985)	United Kingdom	poetry, novel, essays	Jørgen Læssøe (1924–1993)
52	Siegfried Lenz (1926–2014)	West Germany	novel, short story, essays, drama	Nobel Committee
53	Doris Lessing (1919–2013)	United Kingdom	novel, short story, memoirs, drama, poetry, essays	Artur Lundkvist (1906–1991)
54	Saunders Lewis (1893–1985)	United Kingdom	poetry, essays, history, literary criticism	John Ellis Caerwyn Williams (1912–1999)
55	Lin Yutang (1895–1976)	China	novel, philosophy, essays, translation	Peng Yao (?)
56	Astrid Lindgren (1907–2002)	Sweden	novel, short story, drama, screenplay	Klaud Doderer (born 1925); Josef Stummvoll (1902–1982)
57	Väinö Linna (1920–1992)	Finland	novel	Eeva Kilpi (born 1928); A. Sakari (?)
58	Stanislaus Lynch (1907–1983)	Ireland	poetry, essays	Desmond Clarke (1907–1979)
59	Compton Mackenzie (1883–1972)	United Kingdom	novel, short story, drama, poetry, history, biography, essays, literary criticism, memoirs	Norman Jeffares (1920–2005)
60	Hugh MacLennan (1907–1990)	Canada	novel, essays	Lawrence Lande (1906–1998)
61	Harold Macmillan (1894–1986)	United Kingdom	history, essays, memoirs	Carl Becker (1925–1973)
62	Norman Mailer (1923–2007)	United States	novel, short story, poetry, essays, biography, drama, screenplay	Artur Lundkvist (1906–1991)
63	Bernard Malamud (1914–1986)	United States	novel, short story	Lars Gyllensten (1921–2006)
64	André Malraux (1901–1976)	France	novel, essays, literary criticism	Lloyd James Austin (1915–1994); Jean Guéhenno (1890–1978); Jan Kott (1914–2001); Jac Mey (?); John Henry Raleigh (1920–2001); Laurent Versini (1932–2021)
65	Frederick Manfred (1912–1994)	United States	novel, essays	Wayne Shafer Knutson (born 1926); John J. Timmerman (1908–2004)
66	Gabriel Marcel (1889–1973)	France	philosophy, drama	Charles Dédéyan (1910–2003)
67	Gustave Lucien Martin-Saint-René (1888–1973)	France	poetry, novel, essays, literary criticism, drama, songwriting, short story	Henri Guiter (1909–1994)
68	Harry Martinson (1904–1978)	Sweden	poetry, novel, drama, essays	Pär Lagerkvist (1891–1974)
69	László Mécs (1895–1978)	Hungary	poetry, essays	Watson Kirkconnell (1895–1977)
70	Veijo Meri (1928–2015)	Finland	novel, short story, poetry, essays	Osmo Hormia (1926–1983)
71	Vilhelm Moberg (1898–1973)	Sweden	novel, drama, history	Harald Noreng (1913–2006)
72	Eugenio Montale (1896–1981)	Italy	poetry, translation	Carlo Bo (1911–2001); Lanfranco Caretti (1915–1995); Uberto Limentani (1913–1989)
73	Alberto Moravia (1907–1990)	Italy	novel, literary criticism, essays, drama	Jacques Robichez (1914–1999)
74	Sławomir Mrożek (1930–2013)	Poland	drama, essays	Kauko Aatos Ojala (1919–1987)
75	Vidiadhar Surajprasad Naipaul (1932–2018)	Trinidad and Tobago; United Kingdom	novel, short story, essays	Artur Lundkvist (1906–1991)
76	Mikhail Naimy (1889–1988)	Lebanon	poetry, drama, short story, novel, autobiography, literary criticism	Joseph Bassila (?)
77	Pak Dujin (1916–1998)	South Korea	poetry	Baek Cheol (1908–1985)
78	Alan Paton (1903–1988)	South Africa	novel, autobiography, essays	Astley Cooper Partridge (1901–?)
79	José María Pemán (1897–1981)	Spain	poetry, drama, novel, essays, screenplay	Juan de Contreras y López de Ayala (1893–1978)
80	Ezra Pound (1885–1972)	United States	poetry, essays	Hans Galinsky (1909–1991)
81	Pandelis Prevelakis (1909–1986)	Greece	novel, poetry, drama, essays	Kariophilēs Mētsakēs (1932–2013)
82	Henri Queffélec (1910–1992)	France	novel, short story, screenplay	Edmond Jarno (1905–1985)
83	Evaristo Ribera Chevremont (1890–1976)	Puerto Rico	poetry	Washington Lloréns (1899–1989); Ernesto Juan Fonfrias (1909–1990)
84	Yannis Ritsos (1909–1990)	Greece	poetry, songwriting	Per Wästberg (born 1933)
85	Philip Roth (1933–2018)	United States	novel, short story, memoirs, essays	Artur Lundkvist (1906–1991)
86	Georges Schéhadé (1905–1989)	Lebanon	poetry, drama, novel	Joseph Bassila (?); Camille Aboussouan (1919–2013); Fouad Boustany (1904–1994)
87	Arno Schmidt (1914–1979)	West Germany	novel, short story, biography, essays	Nobel Committee
88	Anna Seghers (1900–1983)	East Germany	novel, short story	Heinz Kamnitzer (1917–2001); Volker Klotz (1930–2023)
89	Léopold Sédar Senghor (1906–2001)	Senegal	poetry, essays	Lassi Nummi (1928–2012)
90	Claude Simon (1913–2005)	France	novel, essays	Nobel Committee
91	Zaharia Stancu (1902–1974)	Romania	poetry, novel, philosophy, essays	Miguel Ángel Asturias (1899–1974); Victor Eftimiu (1889–1972)
92	Francis Stuart (1902–2000)	Ireland	novel, short story, poetry, essays	Desmond Clarke (1907–1979)
93	Abraham Sutzkever (1913–2010)	Belarus; Israel	poetry	Joseph Leftwich (1892–1984)
94	Marie Under (1883–1980)	Estonia	poetry	Lassi Nummi (1928–2012)
95	Gerard Walschap (1898–1989)	Belgium	novel, drama, essays	Maurice Gilliams (1900–1982); Willem Pée (1903–1986)
96	Patrick White (1912–1990)	Australia	novel, short story, drama, poetry, autobiography	Muriel Clara Bradbrook (1909–1993); Leslie Rees (1905–2000); Harold Leslie Rogers (1925–1990); Eila Pennanen (1916–1994)
97	Elie Wiesel (1928–2016)	Romania; United States	novel, memoirs, essays, drama	André Neher (1914–1988)
98	Thornton Wilder (1897–1975)	United States	drama, novel, short story	Wolfgang Clemen (1909–1990)
99	Vũ Hoàng Chương (1915–1976)	South Vietnam	poetry, drama	Thanh Lãng (1924–1978)
100	Aaron Zeitlin (1898–1973)	Belarus; Israel	drama, short story, essays, literary criticism	Moshe Starkman (1906–1975)

=== Prize decision ===
In 1972, the Nobel committee consisted of author, critic and permanent secretary of the Swedish Academy Karl Ragnar Gierow (chair), author and critic Johannes Edfelt, author Lars Gyllensten, author Eyvind Johnson, author and critic Artur Lundkvist and author and critic Anders Österling. The reports from members of the committee made public fifty years later reveal that the committee for the 1972 Nobel Prize in Literature firstly focused on awarding an author from the field of German literature.

Heinrich Böll had been considered for the prize by the Nobel committee since the first time he was nominated in 1960. The publication of Gruppenbild mit Dame in 1971, a year when Böll was not nominated for the prize, strengthened his candidacy, and in 1972 the Nobel committee proposed that Böll should be awarded the prize. A shared prize between Böll and Günter Grass was proposed by the committee. The other final candidates were the Italian poet Eugenio Montale and Australian novelist Patrick White.

Karl Ragnar Gierow said in his report that his evaluation emphasized "tactical evaluation rather than literary valuations". While saying that Eugenio Montale's work to him appeared as the "artistically maturest and most essential", Gierow did not want to place Montale first among the candidates but argued that German literature for long had been neglected by the Nobel committee and that there were now two serious candidates in Heinrich Böll and Günter Grass, and also mentioned Siegfried Lenz. Gierow listed Böll as his first proposal, a shared prize to Böll and Grass as his second proposal, White as the third and Montale as the fourth proposal. Committee member Lars Gyllensten made a similar proposal in his report, saying that Böll was the strongest candidate but that a shared prize with Grass could also be well motivated. Committee member Artur Lundkvist agreed that the German literature was "highly worthy to be recognised" and supported the committees recommendation of Böll as the first proposal, while saying that he would put Patrick White's work ahead of Böll's. Academy member Lars Forssell also preferred Patrick White, saying in a letter to committee chair Karl Ragnar Gierow that "Böll is not really a great writer. He has for example not the same scope as Thomas Mann. He is just pretending. That said I don't think he is an absolutely unworthy recipient of the prize, now that Grass has become more pretentious and odd. I just wish his candidacy could rest, if not in peace but at least this year."

== Reactions ==
The choice of Heinrich Böll was controversial for political reasons. As chairman of PEN International, Böll had been accused of supporting the Red Army Faction and the chairman of the Austrian PEN resigned in protest over Böll being awarded the Nobel prize. Böll was also accused of being compliant towards the regime in the Soviet Union, where the freedom of speech for writers were oppressed.

Böll himself said to the Swedish newspaper Svenska Dagbladet "I am happy and surprised, but also worried about the fame that comes with the Nobel prize."

== Award ceremony speech ==
At the award ceremony in Stockholm on 10 December 1972, Karl Ragnar Gierow, permanent secretary of the Swedish Academy, said:

He who attempts to seize in a single grasp the bountiful and very varied authorship of Heinrich Böll finds himself holding an abstraction. Through these writings – begun twenty years ago and culminating in last year’s novel Gruppenbild mit Dame – there runs, however, a twin theme that might serve as such a synoptic abstraction. This could be phrased: The homeless and the aesthetics of the humane. (...)

He writes about what every human being seeks in order to lead a human life, in little things as in great, about “das Wohnen, die Nachbarschaft und die Heimat, das Geld und die Liebe, Religion und Mahlzeiten”, to quote his own enumeration. With its whole register from satire and high-spirited parody to deep suffering, this is a form of passionately engaged aesthetics and it also contains his literary program. He who sets out to portray the bare necessities of life keeps both feet on the ground. (...)

The renewal of German literature, to which Heinrich Boll’s achievements witness and of which they are a significant part, is not an experiment with form – a drowning man scorns the butterfly stroke. Instead it is a rebirth out of annihilation, a resurrection, a culture which, ravaged by icy nights and condemned to extinction, sends up new shoots, blossoms and matures to the joy and benefit of us all. Such was the kind of work Alfred Nobel wished his Prize to reward.

== Nobel lecture ==
Böll delivered a Nobel lecture entitled An Essay on the Reason of Poetry on May 2, 1973 at the Swedish Academy. In his lecture, he said:

"Art is always a good hiding-place, not for dynamite, but for intellectual explosives and social time bombs. Why would there otherwise have been the various Indices? And precisely in their despised and often even despicable beauty and lack of transparency lies the best hiding-place for the barb that brings about the sudden jerk or the sudden recognition."
