= Cleonice Berardinelli =

Brazilian Lusitanist (1916–2023)

- Born: Cleonice Serôa da Motta Berardinelli; 28 August 1916; Rio de Janeiro, Brazil
- Died: 31 January 2023 (aged 106); Rio de Janeiro, Brazil
- Awards: Grand Cross of the Order of Prince Henry; Commander of the Order of Prince Henry; Grand Cross of the Military Order of Saint James of the Sword; Commander of the Military Order of Saint James of the Sword

Academic background
- Education: University of São Paulo; Federal University of Rio de Janeiro
- Thesis: Poesia e Poética de Fernando Pessoa

Academic work
- Discipline: Romance studies
- Institutions: Federal University of Rio de Janeiro; Pontifical Catholic University of Rio de Janeiro; Catholic University of Petrópolis; Rio Branco Institute
- Main interests: Portuguese literature

Cleonice Serôa da Motta Berardinelli (28 August 1916 – 31 January 2023) was a Brazilian university professor and expert in Portuguese literature. A highly respected Lusitanist, she was elected to the Brazilian Academy of Letters in 2009.

== Life and career ==
Berardinelli graduated in 1938 with a degree in Romance studies from the University of São Paulo and was an assistant to renowned professors of Portuguese literature, first in São Paulo with Fidelino de Figueiredo and later at the Federal University of Rio de Janeiro with Martins Moreira Thiers, where she initially taught as an associate professor. Her 1959 dissertation is titled "Poesia e Poética de Fernando Pessoa" (Poetry and Poetics of Fernando Pessoa).

Berardinelli was an expert on Luís de Camões and Fernando Pessoa, but also published important studies and critical editions on Vicente Anes Joeira, the poetry of José Régio, the theater of Gil Vicente, and António Ribeiro Chiado. She taught at the Federal University of Rio de Janeiro from 1944 (retired in 1987), at the Pontifical Catholic University of Rio de Janeiro (retired 2006) from 1963, and at the Catholic University of Petrópolis from 1961. From 1961 to 1963 she was Professor of Portuguese Language and Literature at the Rio Branco Institute, in 1985 Visiting professor at the University of California, Santa Barbara, and in 1987 and 1989 Visiting professor at the University of Lisbon.

She died on 31 January 2023 at the age of 106 in Rio de Janeiro.

== Honors ==
Berardinelli was inducted into the Brazilian Academy of Letters in Rio de Janeiro on December 16, 2009. She succeeded Antônio Olinto as the sixth holder of seat number 8, named after Cláudio Manuel da Costa. and was the oldest living member of the academy until her death at the age of 106 in January 2023.

From 1975 she was a corresponding member of the Lisbon Academy of Sciences .

== Works ==
=== Writings on Pessoa ===
- Fernando Pessoa: Obras em prosa. Introdução e notas de Cleonice Berardinelli. Aguilar, Rio de Janeiro 1975. (10th edition, Nova Aguilar, Rio de Janeiro 2004).
- Fernando Pessoa: Alguma Prosa. Seleção, Introdução e notas de Cleonice Berardinelli. Aguilar, Rio de Janeiro 1976. (6th edition, Nova Fronteira, Rio de Janeiro 2001).
- Fernando Pessoa. Poemas. Nova Fronteira, Rio de Janeiro 1980. (10th edition, 2002).
- Álvaro de Campos. A passagem das horas. Edição crítica. Imprensa Nacional-Casa da Moeda, Lisboa 1988.
- Poemas de Álvaro de Campos. Edição crítica com Introdução, notas e Aparato Genético. Imprensa Nacional-Casa da Moeda, Lisboa 1990.
- Poemas de Álvaro de Campos. Fixação do texto, Introdução e Notas de Cleonice Berardinelli. Nova Fronteira, Rio de Janeiro 1999.
- Fernando Pessoa: Outra vez te revejo. Lacerda Editores, Rio de Janeiro 2004.
- Mensagem de Fernando Pessoa. Organização de Cleonice Berardinelli e Maurício Matos. Edição preparada segundo o exemplar de 1934 corrigido pelo punho do poeta. 7 Letras, Rio de Janeiro 2008.

=== Writings on Camões ===
- Estudos Camonianos. MEC, Ministério da Educação e Cultura/FCRB, Fundação Casa de Rui Barbosa, Rio de Janeiro 1973. (Erweiterte Neuausgabe: Nova Fronteira, Rio de Janeiro 2000).
- Sonetos de Camões. Edição crítica, introdução e notas. Centre Culturel Portugais, Rio de Janeiro 1980.

=== Other literary studies writings and edited volumes ===
- Cantigas de trovadores medievais em português moderno. Organizações Simões, Rio de Janeiro 1953.
- Mário de Sá-Carneiro: Poesia. Antologia, com introdução e notas. Agir, Rio de Janeiro 1958. Erweiterte Neuausgabe: 2005, ISBN 85-220-0681-4 (Eingeschränkte Vorschau in der Google-Buchsuche).
- Auto de Vicente Anes Joeira. Reprodução fac-similar das duas edições quinhentistas, introdução, leitura crítica anotada e índices de palavras. Instituto Nacional do Livro, Rio de Janeiro 1963.
- João de Deus: Poesia. Antologia, com introdução e notas. Agir, Rio de Janeiro 1967.
- Autos de António Ribeiro Chiado. Edição crítica com Introdução e notas. Bd. 1. Instituto Nacional do Livro, Rio de Janeiro 1968. Zusammen mit Ronaldo Menegaz.
- Antologia do Teatro de Gil Vicente. Com introdução e notas. Grifo, Rio de Janeiro 1971. (3. Auflage. Nova Fronteira, Rio de Janeiro 1984).
- Gil Vicente: autos. Antologia, com introdução e notas. Agir, Rio de Janeiro 1974.
- Estudos de Literatura Portuguesa. Imprensa Nacional-Casa da Moeda, Lisboa 1985.
- Antologia da poesia de José Régio. Nova Fronteira, Rio de Janeiro 1985.
- Os melhores poemas de Bocage. Seleção. Global Editora, São Paulo 1987. (3. Auflage 2000).
- Teatro de António Ribeiro Chiado. Edição de Cleonice Berardinelli e Ronaldo Menegaz. Lello & Irmão-Editores, Porto 1994.

== Festschrifts ==
- Gilda Santos (Org.): Cleonice. Clara em sua geração. Homenagem à professora Cleonice Berardinelli. Ed. UFRJ, Rio de Janeiro 1995, ISBN 85-7108-120-4.
