= Stanislaus Lynch =

Irish writer (1908–1983)

- Born: 25 March 1908; Ballyjamesduff, County Cavan, Ireland
- Died: 15 June 1983 (aged 75); Dunsany, County Meath, Ireland
- Occupation: Writer

Stanislaus Lynch (25 March 1908 – 15 June 1983) was an Irish author, poet, journalist, hunter and broadcaster. His work was part of the literature event in the art competition at the 1948 Summer Olympics.

Lynch is the only Irish writer to be awarded two Olympic Diploma and Medal for The Literature of the Chase at the London Games in 1948 and Helsinki in 1952. In 1972, he was nominated for the Nobel Prize in Literature by Irish literary critic Desmond Clarke.

== Life and career ==
Lynch was born in Ballyjamesduff on 25 March 1908, to Thomas, an auctioneer and spirit merchant, and Sarah Lynch. He received his education at Castleknock College in Dublin.

As a journalist, he wrote for The Irish Field, The Irish Times, the Irish Tourist Board and numerous international journals. Both England and Ireland published his poetry and prose, including his famous Rhymes of an Irish Huntsman, A Hunting Man's Rambles and Echoes of the Hunting Horn. He not only wrote but also worked as a broadcaster for an Irish radio station, where he covered the Royal Dublin Horse Show and other equestrian events. He also hunted throughout Ireland and across Europe and won numerous prizes for show jumping, and was a significant poppy trader to the United States and England in the 1950s and 1960s.

Lynch became gravely unwell after leaving the 1952 Olympics and was transported to Helsinki from the ship he was taking home. There, he had to have surgery for a ruptured intestinal ulcer. In his later years, he lived at his residence in Dunsany near Tara. He died on 15 June 1983 and is buried in Skryne in County Meath.

== Legacy ==
On February 21, 2019, an event to honor the life and works of Stanislaus Lynch was held in Cavan County Museum in Ballyjamesduff.

== Publications ==
- Rhymes of an Irish Huntsman (Country Life Limited, 1937)
- Echoes of the Hunting Horn (Devin-Adair Company, 1940)
- From Foal to Tally-Ho (Dundalgan Press, 1948)
- Hounds are Running! (Golden Eagle Books, 1948)
- A Hunting Man's Rambles (George Ronald Books, 1951)
- Hunting Poems: Hoof-prints on Parchment (Irish Tatler, 1952)
- In Search of the Kerry Beagle, edited by Noel Mullins (2008)

== See also ==
- List of Irish Nobel laureates and nominees
