= Desmond Clarke (disambiguation) =

Desmond Clarke (1942–2016) was an Irish author and professor of philosophy.

Des or Desmond Clarke may also refer to:

- Desmond Clarke (writer) (1907–1979), Irish writer and librarian
- Des Clarke (comedian) (born 1981), Scottish stand-up comedian, television and radio presenter
- Des Clarke (Neighbours), a fictional character in the Australian soap opera Neighbours

== See also ==
- Desmond Clark (disambiguation)
