= Fidelino de Figueiredo =

Portuguese literary scholar

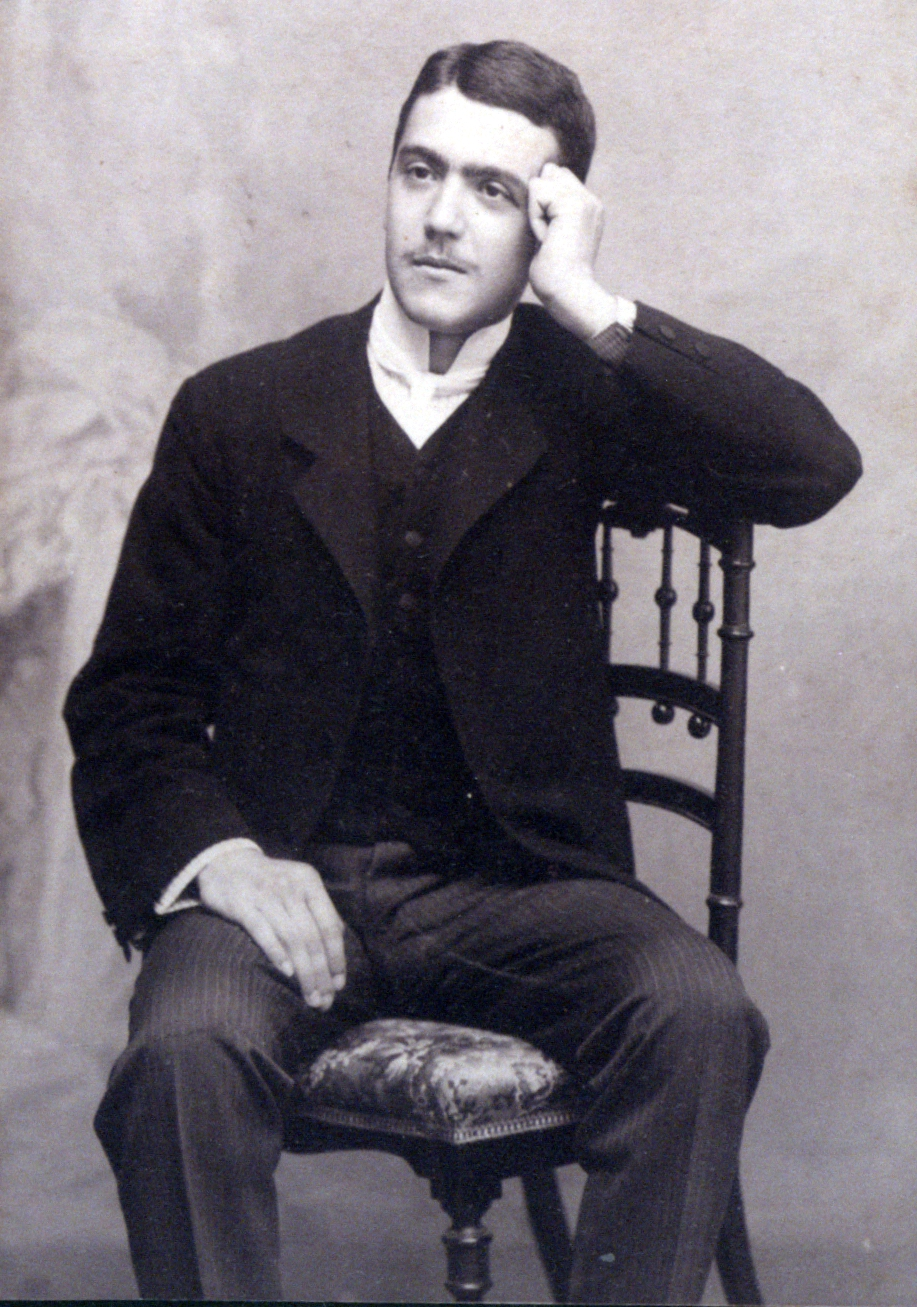
Fidelino de Figueiredo

Fidelino de Sousa Figueiredo was a Portuguese literary scholar. He was born in 1889, in Lisbon, and died in 1967. After graduating from university in 1910, he worked at the Ministry of National Education and was twice appointed director of the National Library of Lisbon, between 1918–19 and 1927. However, university teaching led him to live abroad for about a decade and a half, primarily in Brazil.

He was a member of numerous internationally renowned Institutes and Academies. He contributed to the national and foreign press, acting as editor of some of the most prestigious periodicals of his time, such as El Debate, from Madrid, O Jornal, from Rio de Janeiro, and the North American Land and Freedom, among other newspapers and magazines. He was director of Revista de História, between 1912 and 1917. He specialized in the fields of history and literary criticism, publishing, in the first decades of the 20th century, works of great importance on the history of classical, romantic and realist Portuguese literature. As a scholar of culture in general and literature in particular, some of his investigations are considered essential works for the understanding of Portuguese language and literature.

He was forced to go into exile in November 1927, after the establishment of the military dictatorship. He took refuge in Spain, later becoming a professor and researcher of recognized merit in several American and European universities. He then extended the scope of his analysis to wider domains such as Iberian comparative literature, the study of the 16th century epic, and the historical and methodological analysis of literary criticism. In Brazil, where he lived for several years until his return to Portugal, he directed, between 1938 and 1954, the magazine Letras and exercised a decisive influence on later scholars of Portuguese literature teaching figures such as Cleonice Berardinelli.

His literary estate, including a vast quantity of correspondence, is deposited at the University of Sao Paulo, where he taught. Throughout his literary life, he was awarded several prizes and distinctions. Perhaps the most important was given to him in 1941, in Japan, for his essay "The Japanese in Portuguese Literature", which won the Tokyo International Literary Competition.
