= Desmond Clark (disambiguation) =

Desmond Clark is an American football player.

Desmond Clark may also refer to:

- J. Desmond Clark (1916–2002), British archaeologist
- Des Clark (born 1972), Australian rugby league player
- Desmond Clark (mayor) on List of mayors and lord mayors of Melbourne

== See also ==
- Desmond Clarke (disambiguation)
