= Catholic University of Petrópolis =

Private university in Petrópolis, Brazil

- Universidade Católica de Petrópolis
- Coat of arms of the university
- Other names: UCP
- Motto: Non excidet
- Motto in English: Not be extinguished
- Type: Private, non-profit
- Established: December 21, 1961
- Religious affiliation: Roman Catholic Church
- Chancellor: Dom Filippo Santoro
- Rector: José Luiz Rangel Sampaio Fernandes
- Vice rector: José Maria Pereira
- Location: Petrópolis, Rio de Janeiro, Brazil
- Campus: Urban
- Colors: Orange and blue
- Website: www.ucp.br

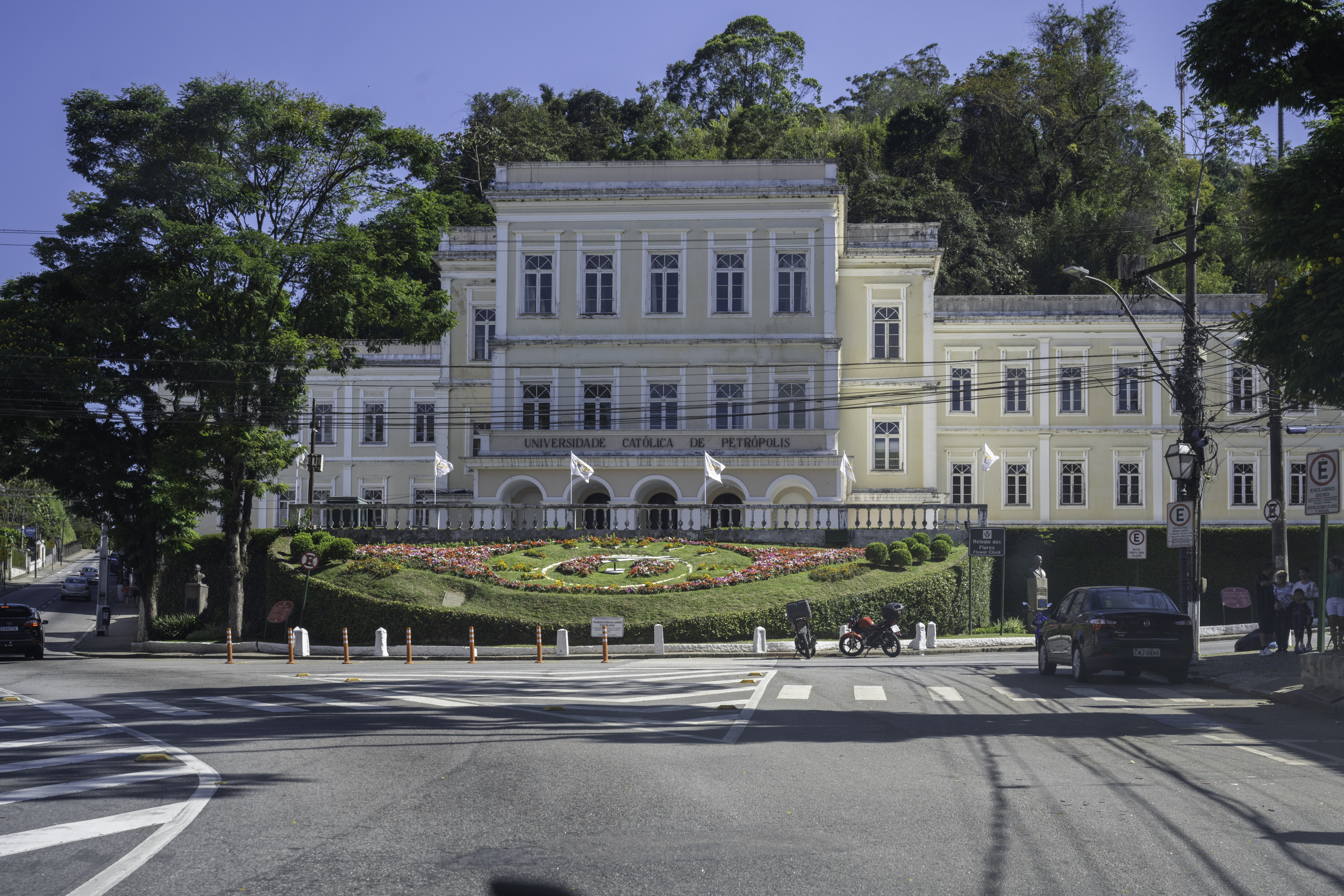
Barão do Amazonas Campus

The Catholic University of Petrópolis (Portuguese: Universidade Católica de Petrópolis, UCP) is a private and non-profit university in Petrópolis — the capital of the State of Rio de Janeiro for nine years and the largest city of the highlands of the state. It is maintained by the Catholic Archdiocese of Petrópolis. The university had the highest score in the state of Rio de Janeiro in the National Student Performance Exam assessment for the bachelor's degree in Physiotherapy (undergraduate) and the third highest score in the bachelor's degree in Biomedicine (undergraduate). With that result, UCP is the best evaluated private university in the state in the respective courses. UCP Law School is one of the only ones recommended by the National Bar Association of Brazil in the region.

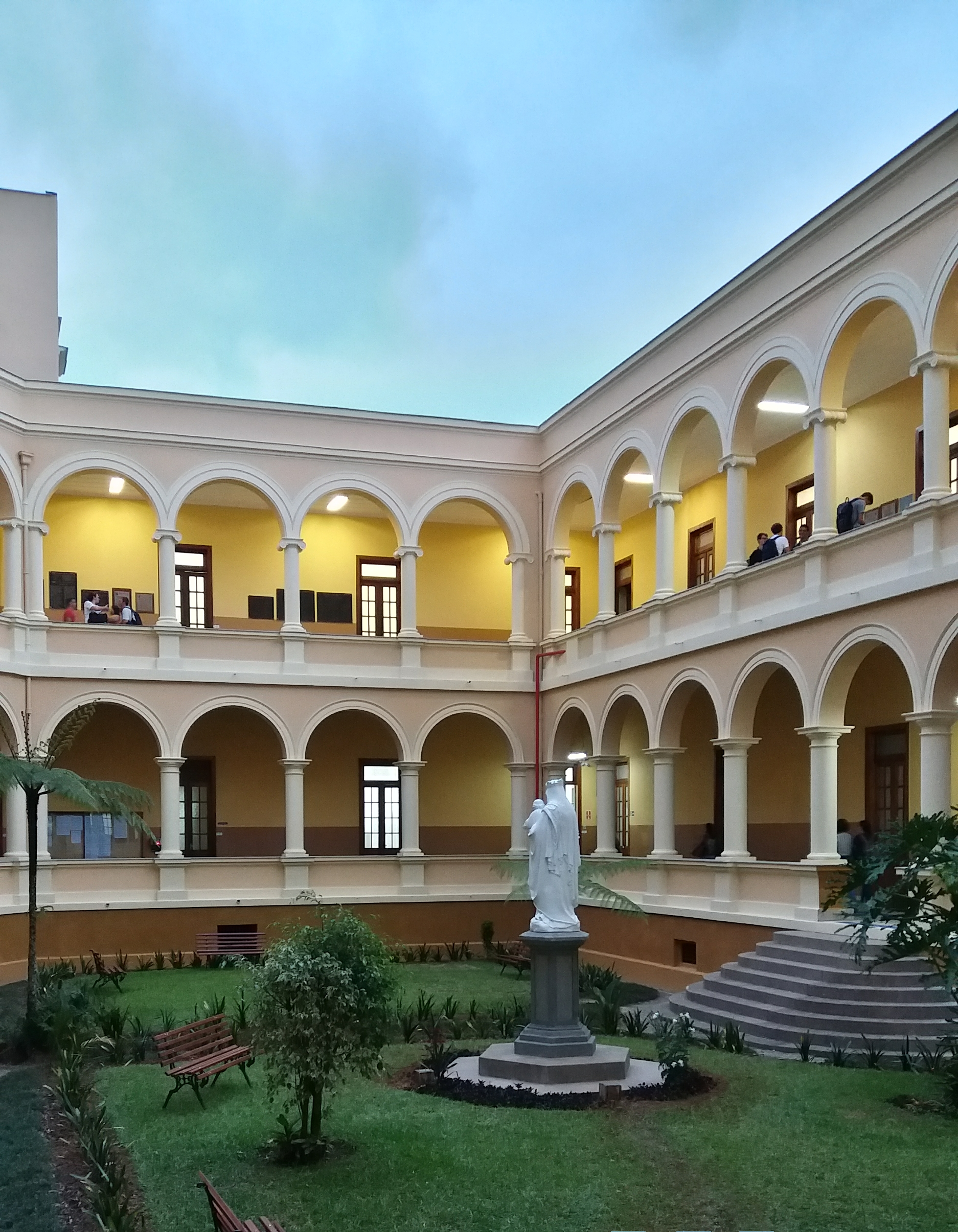
Benjamin Constant Campus

== Unities and courses ==
=== Undergraduate Degree ===
Faculty	Course	Campus
Center of Engineering and Computing (CEC)	Architecture and urbanism	Barão do Amazonas
Center of Engineering and Computing (CEC)	Civil engineering	Barão do Amazonas
Center of Engineering and Computing (CEC)	Electrical engineering	Barão do Amazonas
Center of Engineering and Computing (CEC)	Mechanical engineering	Barão do Amazonas
Center of Engineering and Computing (CEC)	Computer engineering	Barão do Amazonas
Center of Engineering and Computing (CEC)	Control and Automation engineering	Barão do Amazonas
Center of Engineering and Computing (CEC)	Production engineering	Barão do Amazonas
Center of Engineering and Computing (CEC)	Petroleum engineering	Barão do Amazonas
Center of Engineering and Computing (CEC)	Mechatronics Engineering	Barão do Amazonas
Legal Science Center (CCJ)	Law	Benjamin Constant
Center for Applied Social Sciences (CCSA)	Administration (Business)	Benjamin Constant
Center for Applied Social Sciences (CCSA)	Accountancy	Benjamin Constant
Center for Applied Social Sciences (CCSA)	Economic sciences	Benjamin Constant
Center for Applied Social Sciences (CCSA)	Communication	Benjamin Constant
Center for Applied Social Sciences (CCSA)	Marketing	Benjamin Constant
Center for Applied Social Sciences (CCSA)	International relations	Benjamin Constant
Center for Applied Social Sciences (CCSA)	Logistics	Benjamin Constant
Health Sciences Center (CCS)	Biomedicine	Barão do Amazonas
Health Sciences Center (CCS)	Physical therapy	Barão do Amazonas
Health Sciences Center (CCS)	Psychology	Barão do Amazonas
Health Sciences Center (CCS)	Physical education	Barão do Amazonas
Center of Theology and Humanities (CTH)	Philosophy	Benjamin Constant
Center of Theology and Humanities (CTH)	Pedagogy (education)	Benjamin Constant
Center of Theology and Humanities (CTH)	History	Benjamin Constant
Center of Theology and Humanities (CTH)	Languages	Benjamin Constant
Center of Theology and Humanities (CTH)	Theology	Benjamin Constant
Center of Theology and Humanities (CTH)	Music	Benjamin Constant (UCP Music School)

== Admission ==
For undergraduate admission to UCP two exams are used: ENEM and its own vestibular test.
