= Lusitanian studies =

Study of Portuguese language and literature

Lusitanian studies is a branch of linguistics concerned with the Portuguese language and literature, and is also known as Portuguese philology. The name derives from the Latin name for Portugal, Lusitania, and thus from the Roman province of the same name which encompassed large parts of present-day Portugal. Together with Hispanic studies, French studies, and Italian studies, it forms the core disciplines of Romance studies.

Lusitanian studies exists in various countries around the world. The International Association of Lusitanists (AIL) has members from more than 30 countries. Their biannual journal, Veredas, publishes research on the literature and culture of Portuguese-speaking countries. Another academic journal, the Journal of Lusophone Studies, is published by the American Portuguese Studies Association.

Many academic and research programs are supported by Portugal's Instituto Camões.

Outside of countries with Portuguese as an official language, there are Lusophone communities in Asia, including in India (Goa), Indonesia (East Timor), and China (Macau).

== Sub-areas ==
Named and divided according to geographical and linguistic aspects, Lusitanian studies deal with the following subfields:

- Afro-Lusitanian studies deals with the Portuguese language on the African continent (Angola, Cape Verde, Equatorial Guinea, Guinea-Bissau, Mozambique, São Tomé and Príncipe, and others).
- Brazilian studies focuses on the language and literature of Brazil.
- Galician studies examines Galician as spoken in Spain, which is closely related to Portuguese.
- Creolistics deals, among other things, with the mixing of Portuguese with indigenous and other colonial languages.
- Portuguese studies is a relatively new term for the academic study of the language and literature of mainland Portugal, which was previously often used synonymously with the term Lusitanian studies.

== See also ==
- Community of Portuguese Language Countries
