= Jean Dubois (linguist) =

French linguist, grammarian and lexicographer

- Born: 17 August 1920; Paris, France
- Died: 15 April 2015 (aged 94); Aix-en-Provence, France
- Occupations: Linguist; Grammarian; Lexicographer

Academic background
- Academic advisor: Robert-Léon Wagner

Academic work
- Doctoral students: Luce Irigaray

Jean Dubois (French: [ʒɑ̃ dybwa]; 17 August 1920 – 15 April 2015) was a French linguist, grammarian and lexicographer.

== Publications ==
- 1960: Dictionnaire de la langue française classique, in collaboration with René Lagane, preface by P. Clarac, with grammatical index, Librairie classique Belin, reprinted under the title Dictionnaire du français classique, in collaboration with Alain Lerond, Larousse, 1971.
- 1962: Le vocabulaire politique et social en France de 1869 à 1872 à travers les œuvres des écrivains, les revues et les journaux, thesis for the doctorat ès lettres, Éditions Larousse.
- 1962: Étude sur la dérivation suffixale en français moderne et contemporain. Essai d'interprétation des mouvements observés dans le domaine de la morphologie des mots construits, complementary thesis for the doctorat ès lettres, Larousse.
- 1964:Nouveau dictionnaire étymologique et historique, with Henri Mitterand (refonte du Dictionnaire étymologique de A. Dauzat), Larousse.
- 1965: Grammaire structurale : nom et pronom, Larousse.
- 1965:Grammaire structurale : le verbe, Larousse.
- 1967: Dictionnaire du français contemporain, with René Lagane, Georges Niobey, Didier and Jacqueline Casalis, Henri Meschonnic, Larousse, reprinted in 1980 as Dictionnaire du français contemporain illustré (DFC).
- 1969: Grammaire structurale : la phrase et les transformations, Larousse.
- 1970: Éléments de linguistique française, with Françoise Dubois-Charlier, Larousse.
- 1971: Introduction à la lexicographie : le dictionnaire, with Claude Dubois, Larousse.
- 1973: La nouvelle grammaire du français, with René Lagane, Larousse.
- 1973: Dictionnaire de linguistique, with Mathée Giacomo, Louis Guespin, Christiane Marcellesi, Jean-Baptiste Marcellesi, Jean-Pierre Mevel, Larousse.
- 1975: Lexis, dictionnaire de la langue française, under the direction of J. Dubois, with Cl. Kannas, J. P. Mevel, S. Hudelot, etc., Larousse, reprinted and augmented under the title Lexis, Larousse de la langue française, 1979.
- 1976: Grammaire de base, Larousse.
- 1978: Dictionnaire du français langue étrangère Niveau 1, with F. Dubois-Charlier, Larousse.
- 1979: Dictionnaire du français langue étrangère Niveau 2, with F. Dubois-Charlier, Larousse.
- 1982: Larousse de l'orthographe, with F. Dubois-Charlier, Larousse, new title Nouveau Larousse de l'orthographe in 1994.
- 1986: Dictionnaire du français au collège, Larousse.
- 1988: Petit dictionnaire de la langue française, collection Références, Larousse.
- 1993: Dictionnaire de poche de la langue française, with F. Dubois-Charlier, J.P. Mevel, Hachette.
- 1993: Dictionnaire électronique des verbes français, with F. Dubois-Charlier.
- 1994: Les verbes français, with F. Dubois- Charlier, Larousse.
- 1995: Dictionnaire électronique des mots français, with F. Dubois-Charlier, Aix-en-Provence.
- 1995: Dictionnaire électronique des affixes (préfixes et suffixes), with F. Dubois-Charlier, Aix, 1995.
- 1995: Dictionnaire électronique des locutions, Aix, 1995.
- 1999: La dérivation suffixale, with F. Dubois-Charlier, Nathan.
- 2000: Dictionnaire des suffixes en français, with F. Dubois-Charlier, Aix.
- 2001: Composition et préfixation, with F. Dubois-Charlier, Aix.
- 2002: Structures verbales, with F. Dubois-Charlier, Aix.
- 2004: Locutions en français, with F. Dubois-Charlier, Aix.
- 2005: Adjectifs en français, with F. Dubois-Charlier, Aix.
- 2005: Dictionnaire étymologique et historique du français, refonte totale du Nouveau Dictionnaire étymologique, with Henri Mitterand and collaboration of F. Dubois-Charlier, Larousse.
- 2006: Le nombre en français, with F. Dubois-Charlier, Aix.

== Bibliography ==
- Lexique, syntaxe et analyse automatique des textes. Hommage à Jean Dubois, Danielle Leeman and Serge Meleuc, Université Paris X-Nanterre, 1996 (LINX 34–35).
- Empirie, théorie, exploitation. Le travail de Jean Dubois sur les verbes français, Danielle Leeman and Paul Sabatier († 1913), in: Languages 179–180, 2010.
- Le Monde 23. April 2015
- Franz Josef Hausmann, Was ist und was soll ein Lernwörterbuch? Dictionnaire du français contemporain compared with the Petit Robert", in: Zeitschrift für französische Sprache und Literatur 84, 1974, (p. 97–129).
