= Elisabet Hermodsson =

Swedish writer, poet, composer, and artist

Elisabet Hermodsson (20 September 1927 – 11 May 2017) was a Swedish writer, poet, composer and artist. She became well known in the 1970s for poetry inspired by second-wave feminism.

Hermodsson was born in Gothenburg.
