= Michał Choromański =

Polish writer and playwright

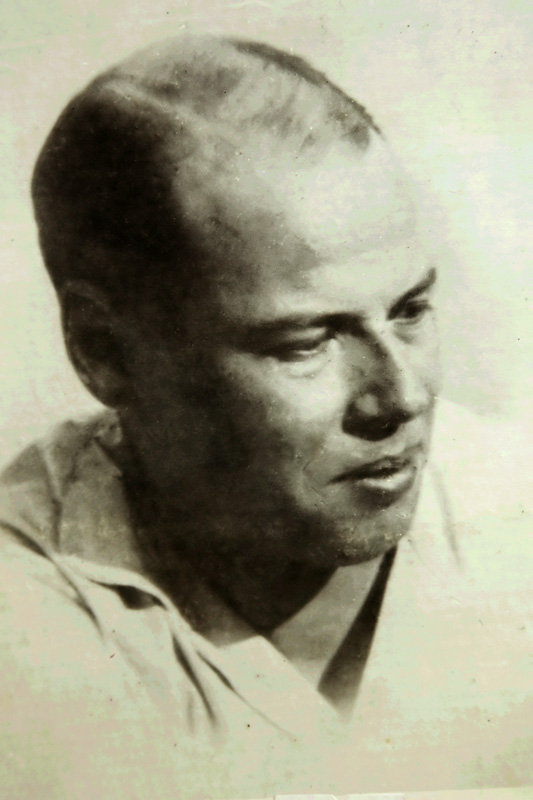
- Born: 22 June 1904; Kropyvnytskyi (then Yelisavetgrad), Ukraine
- Died: May 14, 1972 (aged 67); Warsaw, Poland
- Known for: Writer, playwright, translator
- Notable work: Zazdrość i medycyna

Michał Choromański (9 June O.S. 1904 – 14 May 1972), was a Polish writer, playwright and translator. He is best known for his novelistic studies of psychological states.

== Early life and education ==
Michał Choromański was born in Yelisavetgrad (now Kropyvnytskyi), into a Polish doctor's family as the son of biologist Konstanty Choromański, who died during World War I. He spent his childhood and youth in Yelisavetgrad and attended the high school and the Technical School of Economics, and was writing his first poems in Russian. Experiencing chaos and the horrors of revolutionary Russia, Choromański moved from Yelisavetgrad first to Warsaw and then to Podhale in 1924. He studied pedagogy and psychology and as a 17-year-old started working as a tutor, paramedic and hospital administrator, drawing teacher and literary director of a workers' club and wrote reviews for a suburban newspaper. He was also interested in painting and created portraits. He fell ill from ankle tuberculosis, caused by stress and misery, but was able to avoid leg amputation and was treated in spas.

=== Popular books ===
- Biali bracia (1931)
- Zazdrość i medycyna (1932), screened (1973)
- Opowiadania dwuznaczne (1934)
- Szpital Czerwonego Krzyża (printed in „Czas” 1937, separate edition 1959)
- Prolegomena do wszelkich nauk hermetycznych (1958)
- Schodami w górę, schodami w dół (1965), screened (1988)
- Dygresje na temat kaloszy (1966)
- Makumba, czyli drzewo gadające (1968)
- W rzecz wstąpić (1968)
- Słowacki wysp tropikalnych (1969)
- Głownictwo, moglitwa i praktykarze (1969)
- Kotły Beethovenowskie (1970)
- Różowe krowy i szare scandalie (1970)
- Miłosny atlas anatomiczny (1972)
- Memuary (1976, cześniej drukowane w „Przekroju”)
- Opowiadanie wariackie (1979)
- Skandal w Wesołych Bagniskach (1993); filmed as the Polish comedy horror Horror w Wesołych Bagniskach (1995)
