= Henri Mitterand =

French academic and writer (1928–2021)

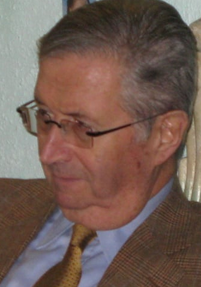
- Born: 7 August 1928; Vault-de-Lugny, France
- Died: 8 October 2021 (aged 93); Paris, France
- Occupations: Professor; Writer

Henri Mitterand (7 August 1928 – 8 October 2021) was a French academic, author, critic, and editor. He was a specialist on the works of Émile Zola, one of the founders of sociological criticism in France.

== Biography ==
Mitterand graduated from the École normale supérieure with a degree in literature in 1948 and became an associate professor at the school in 1951. He was Pensionary of the Fondation Thiers from 1952 to 1955 and earned a doctorate in literature in 1959. He was a professor at Paris 8 University Vincennes-Saint-Denis from 1968 to 1978, at Sorbonne Nouvelle University Paris 3 from 1978 to 1990, and at Columbia University from 1989 to 2004. He was a professor emeritus at Sorbonne Nouvelle and Columbia and had also taught at Saarland University, Stanford University, the University of Toronto, the Université du Québec à Montréal, the Università degli Studi di Napoli "L'Orientale", and Philadelphia University. He lectured at over seventy universities across Europe, North America, North Africa, the Middle East, and India.

Mitterand devoted many of his books and articles to the works of Émile Zola, as well as other writers of the 19th and 20th Centuries. He compiled Zola's Œuvres complètes. From 1964 to 1987, he directed Les Cahiers naturalistes, devoted to the life and study of the works of Zola and the history of the Dreyfus affair. He received several prizes from the Académie Française and was a member of multiple academies and societies.

Henri Mitterand died in Paris on 8 October 2021 at the age of 93.

== Publications ==
=== Editions ===
- Les Rougon-Macquart
- Œuvres complètes
- Carnets d'enquêtes : Une ethnographie inédite de la France (1987)
- Lettres croisées de Paul Cézanne et Émile Zola (1858-1887) (2016)

=== On Zola ===
- Album de la Pléiade : Émile Zola (1963)
- Zola et le Naturalisme (1986)
- Zola - L'histoire et la fiction (1990)
- Zola - La vérité en marche (1995)
- Sous le regard d'Olympia 1840-1870 (1999)
- L'Homme de Germinal 1871-1893 (2000)
- L'Honneur 1893-1902 (2001)
- Passion Émile Zola. Les délires de la vérité (2002)
- Les Manuscrits et les dessins de Zola (2002)
- Le Paris de Zola (2008)
- Zola tel qu'en lui-même (2009)
- Autodictionnaire Zola (2012)
- Lectures de Zola (2015)
- On croit comprendre le monde avec ça ! Entretiens mémoriels avec Henri Mitterand (2021)
- Zola, la mort du père (2021)

=== On French literature ===
- La Lecture sociocritique du texte romanesque (1972)
- Le Discours du roman (1980)
- L’Illusion réaliste. De Balzac à Aragon (1994)
- La littérature française du xxe siècle (1996)
- Le Roman à l’œuvre. Genèse et valeurs (1998)
- Lire/Délire Zola

=== Grammatical and linguistic works ===
- Les Mots français (1963)
- Nouveau dictionnaire étymologique et historique (1964)
- A B C de grammaire française (1969)
- Le Regard et le Signe (1987)

=== On art ===
- Camille Pissarro. Turpitudes sociales (2009)

== Distinctions ==
- Prix Georges-Dupau (1969)
- Prix Dumas-Millier (1978)
- Prix Pierre-de-Régnier (1983)
- Prix de la biographie de l'Académie française (2003)
