= Antônio Olinto =

Brazilian writer and translator (1919–2009)

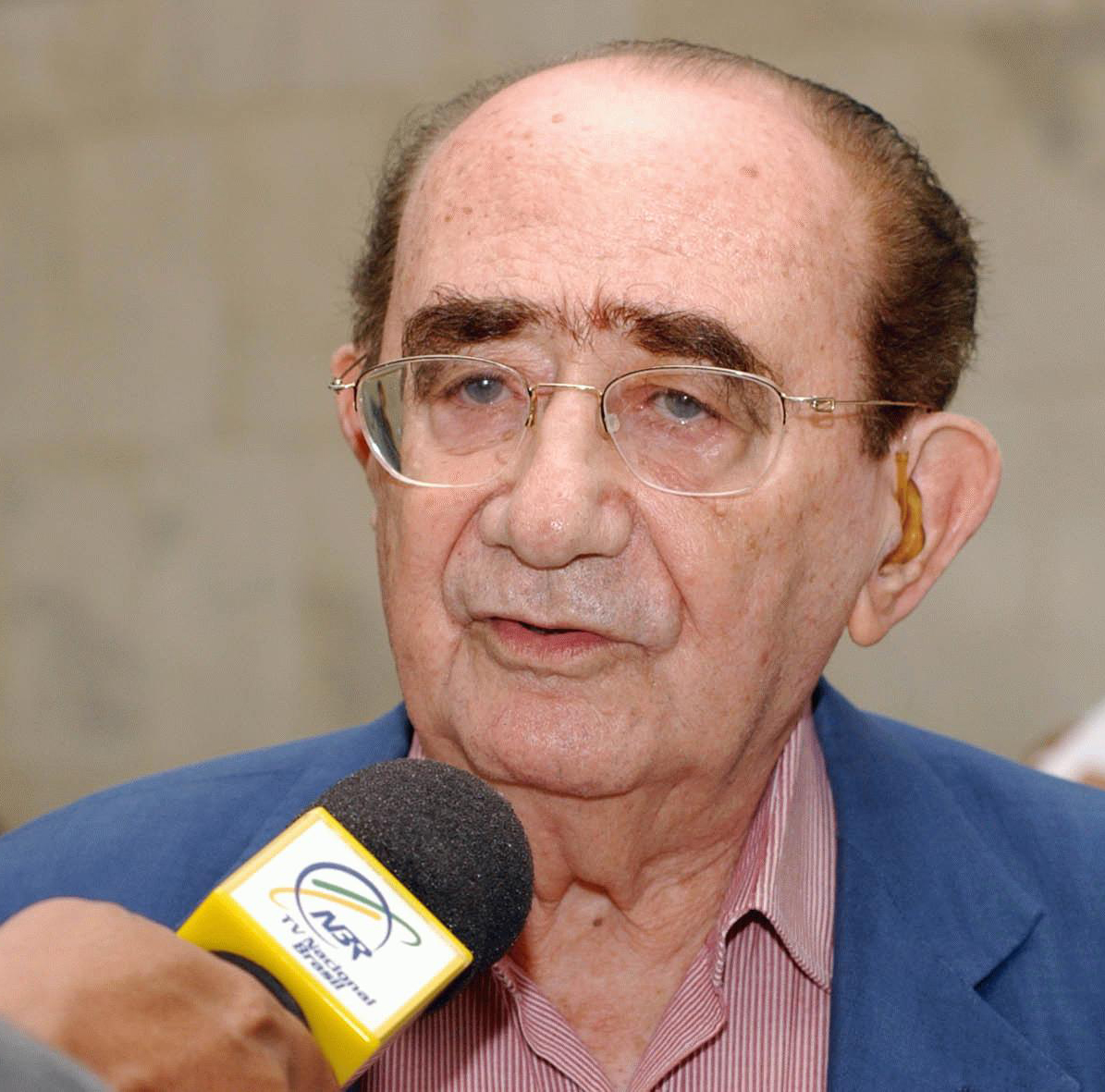
- Olinto in 2003
- Born: Antônio Olinto Marques da Rocha; 10 May 1919; Ubá, Minas Gerais, Brazil
- Died: 12 September 2009 (aged 90); Rio de Janeiro City, Rio de Janeiro, Brazil
- Occupations: Novelist; poet; essayist; literary critic; translator

Antônio Olinto Marques da Rocha (Ubá, MG - May 10, 1919 – Rio de Janeiro, RJ - September 12, 2009) was a Brazilian writer, essayist and translator.

Among his work are included poetry, novels, literary criticism, political analysis, children's literature and dictionaries.

He occupied the 8th chair of the Brazilian Academy of Letters from 1997 until his death in 2009.

Preceded by Antônio Callado	Brazilian Academy of Letters - Occupant of the 8th chair 1997 — 2009	Succeeded by Cleonice Berardinelli
