= Arthur E. Gordon =

American archaeologist and classical philologist (1902-1989)

Arthur Ernest Gordon (October 7, 1902 -- May 11, 1989) was an American classical philologist and epigraphist.

== Life and career ==
Born in Marlborough, Vermont, Gordon studied classical philology at Dartmouth College, receiving his bachelor's degree in 1923. He continued his studies at the American Academy in Rome. In 1925 he became a lecturer in Latin at Dartmouth College and in 1928 at Western Reserve University. He received his Ph.D. from Johns Hopkins University in 1929, where he worked with Tenney Frank, and afterwards briefly taught Latin and Ancient History at the University of Vermont. Gordon was invited to the University of California at Berkeley as Sather Professor for 1929, and upon the recommendation of Frank, the Classics Department appointed Arthur as Assistant Professor of Latin in 1930, where he taught for 40 years, and served as its chairman from 1953 to 1959. During his 1948/1949 sabbatical, Gordon received a fellowship at the American Academy in Rome. In 1952 he was president of the Philological Association of the Pacific Coast. From 1955 to 1956 he was a Guggenheim Fellow and Fulbright Fellow. After retiring, Gordon taught at college in Ashland, Ohio and at Ohio State University.

He was married to Joyce Anna Stiefbold, who appeared as co-author in some of his publications.

Gordon applied his knowledge of Latin inscriptions to Latin grammar, the precise knowledge of which was the focus of his teaching. Gordon was also involved in the publication of Latin inscriptions in the Corpus Inscriptionum Latinarum.

== Publications ==
- Quintus Veranius, consul A.D. 49; a study based upon his recently identified sepulchral inscription (Berkeley: University of California Press, 1952)
- With Joyce Gordon, Album of Dated Latin Inscriptions, (Berkeley: University of California Press, 1958-1965) 7 volumes.
- Illustrated Introduction to Latin Epigraphy (Berkeley: University of California Press, 1983) ISBN 978-0520050792

== Sources ==
- William S. Anderson, "Gordon, Arthur Ernest". Ward W. Briggs (ed.), Biographical Dictionary of North American Classicists (Westport: Greenwood Press, 1994), pp. 226–228 ISBN 0-313-24560-6
- University of California: In Memoriam, originally written 1989 (last accessed 2 April 2020)
