= Maurice Gilliams =

Flemish writer and poet

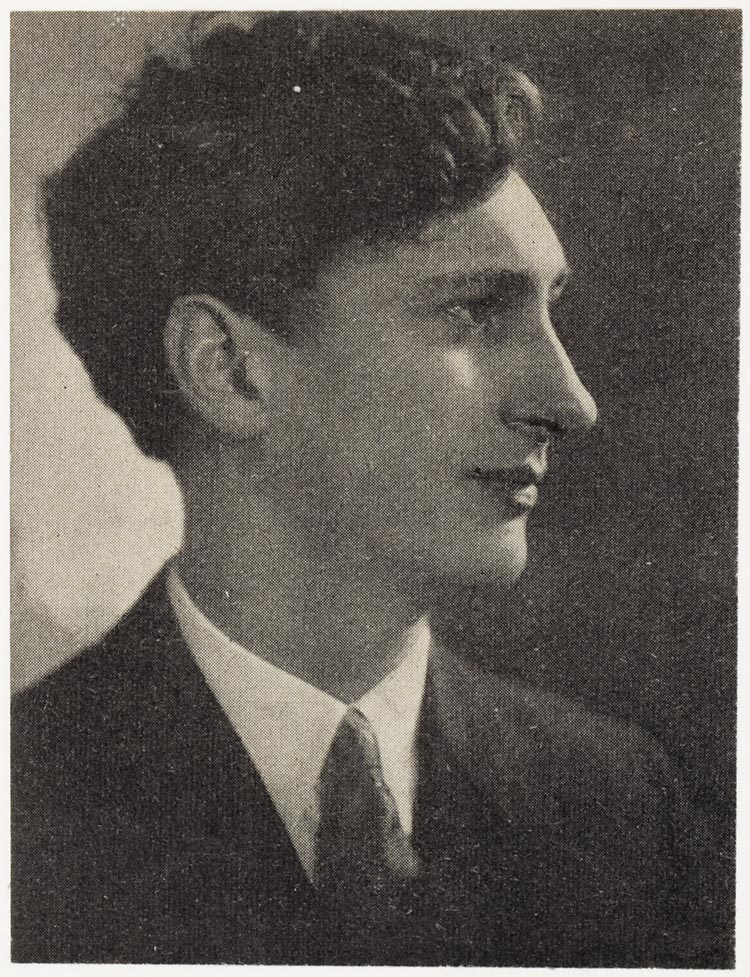
- Born: 20 July 1900; Antwerp
- Died: 18 October 1982 (aged 82); Antwerp
- Occupations: writer, librarian
- Writing career
- Notable works: Elias, or the struggle with the nightingales
- Website: www.mauricegilliams.nl

Maurice, Baron Gilliams (Antwerp, 20 July 1900-Antwerp, 18 October 1982) was a Flemish writer and poet.

== Life and work ==
Gilliams was the son of printer Frans Gilliams, and he learned to be a typographer. On 27 August 1935, he married Gabriëlle Baelemans, but they separated soon thereafter, although a divorce would not take place until 1976 due to the resistance of Gabriëlle. On 26 April 1976 he married Maria Eliza Antonia de Raeymaekers.

He worked for the company of his father and he lectured on typography at the Vakschool voor Kunstambachten of Roger Avermaete in Antwerp. In 1947, he became a member of the Koninklijke Academie voor Nederlandse Taal- en Letterkunde of which he became director in 1954. In September 1955, he started working as scientific librarian of the Koninklijk Museum voor Schone Kunsten in Antwerp. From 1960 until 1975, he was secretary of the Koninklijke Vlaamse Academie voor Taal- en Letterkunde in Ghent.

His breakthrough as writer came with his autobiographical novel Elias of het gevecht met de nachtegalen (E: Elias or the fighting with the nightingales) at the age of 35.

Maurice Gilliams always wrote autobiographically, generally concerning his failed marriage and his lost youth. He wrote both to poems and prose. After his death the Maurice Gilliamsprijs was established. In the garden of the Elzenveld in Antwerp stands a statue of him by Rik Poot.

== Bibliography (English transl.) ==
- Maurice Gilliams: Elias, or the struggle with the nightingales. Translated by André Lefevere. Los Angeles, Sun & Moon Press, 1995.
- Maurice Gilliams: The bottle at sea. The complete poems. Translation & introd. by Marian de Vooght. København, Green Integer, 2006. ISBN 978-1-933382-82-1
- Collected works, Vita Brevis (1975).

== Awards ==
- 1969 - Constantijn Huygensprijs for his entire oeuvre
- 1972 - Driejaarlijkse Staatsprijs for his career as a writer
- 1980 - Doctor honoris causa at the University of Ghent
- 1980 - Prijs der Nederlandse Letteren

== See also ==
- Flemish literature

== Sources ==
- Maurice Gilliams (Pandora) (in Dutch)
- Maurice Gilliams (Mysitehome) (in Dutch)
- Maurice Gilliams (Kunstbus) (in Dutch)
- Elias of het gevecht met de nachtegalen (Parels uit de DBNL) (in Dutch)
