= Desmond Clarke (writer) =

Irish librarian and writer

- Born: 1907; Dublin, Ireland
- Died: 1979 (aged 71–72)
- Occupation: Literary critic
- Writing career
- Genre: Non-fiction

Desmond Clarke (1907 – 25 May 1979) was an Irish librarian, writer and former president of the Library Association of Ireland. Clarke was the biographer of various Irish figures including Arthur Dobbs, Thomas Prior, and Marie-Louise O'Murphy.

== Life ==
He was born in Dublin, where his family had moved from County Mayo. He was librarian of the Royal Dublin Society for many years. He was editor of An Leabharlann, journal of the Library Association of Ireland.

== Works ==
- Thomas Prior, 1681-1751, Founder of the Royal Dublin Society (Dublin: RDS, 1951)
- Arthur Dobbs, Esquire, 1689-1765: Surveyor-general of Ireland, Prospector and Governor of North Carolina (London: Bodley Head 1958)
- The Ingenious Mr Edgeworth (London: Oldbourne 1965)
- The Changing Face of Literature: A Discussion and Evaluation of Developments over the Past Fifty Years: Proceedings of the 38th International P.E.N. Congress (Dublin: PEN Center 1972)
- The Life and Loves of Marie Louise O'Morphi (Belfast: Blackstaff Press, 1979)

=== As editor ===
- RDS: The Royal Dublin Society 1731-1981 (Dublin: Gill & Macmillan 1981)
- Clarke, Desmond, ed. (1985). Ireland in Fiction: A Guide to Irish Novels, Tales, Romances and Folklore. Part II. Cork: Royal Carbery.
