= Lawrence Lande =

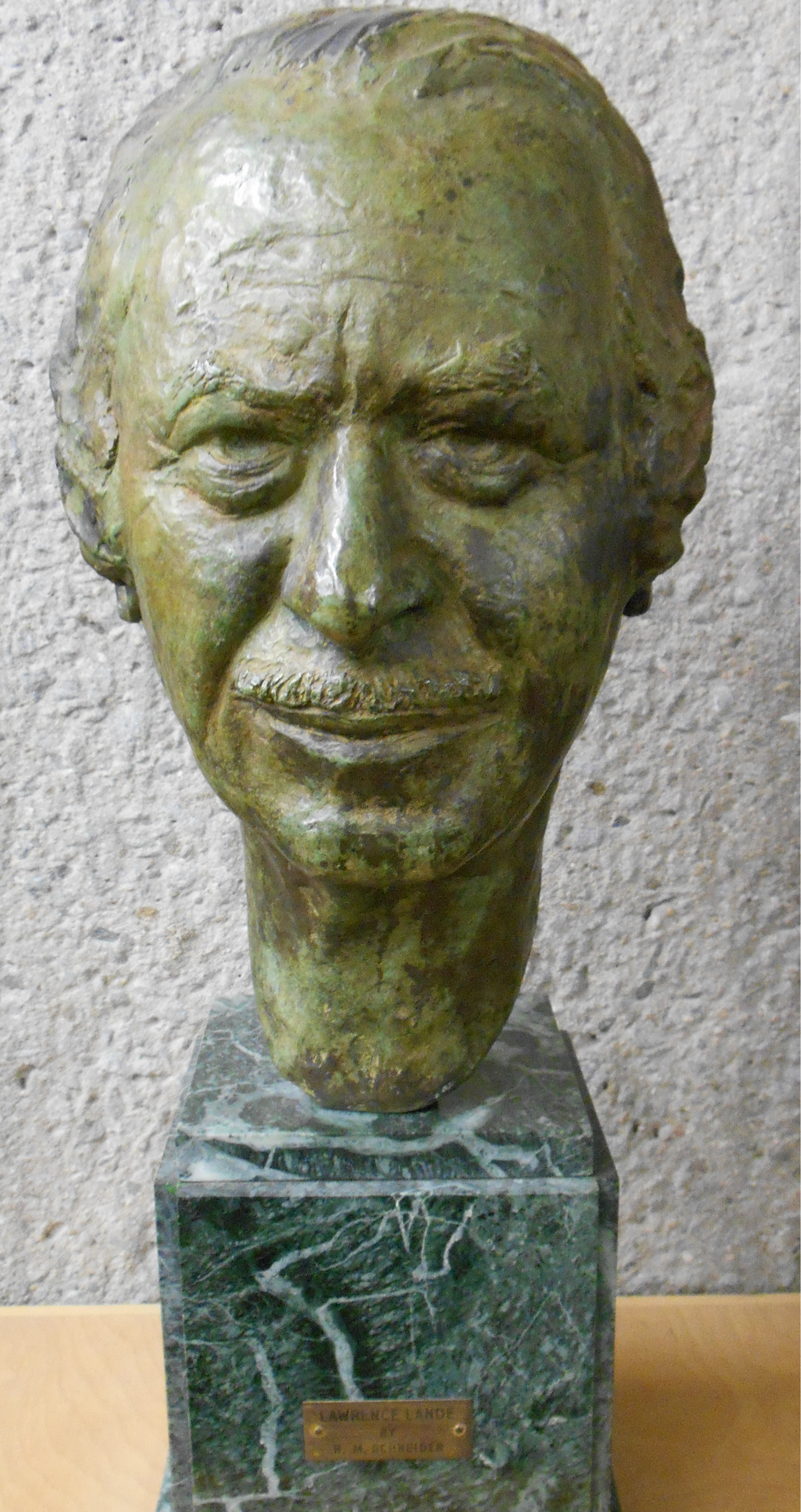
- A sculpture of Lawrence Lande in McGill University, Montreal, Quebec, Canada
- Born: November 11, 1906
- Occupation: Author

Lawrence M. Lande, OC (November 11, 1906 – 1998) was a writer, bibliophile, bibliographer, and collector of books and manuscripts. He donated a book collection of early Canadiana to McGill University. Library and Archives Canada considered him one of the greatest collectors of Canadian books and manuscripts.

Lande devoted his life to collecting books and manuscripts, and to bestowing his collections upon favorite institutions. His habit as a collector was to gather material thematically, and then to catalog it in lavishly illustrated and bound volumes. Typically, the catalogues included a special section presenting important manuscript material transcribed and published for the first time. The books were printed in tiny editions, and distributed to friends, colleagues, and libraries.

In 1988 he was honored with the Sir Thomas More Medal for Book Collecting, "Private Collecting for the Public Good," by the University of San Francisco Gleeson Library and the Gleeson Library Associates.

== Lande Canadiana Collection at McGill University ==
The original part of the Lande Canadiana Collection was acquired in 1965 and comprised some 2300 items. To this original donation, several additions were made between 1965 and 1975, both by gift and purchase. The Lande Collection now consists of some 12,000 items, including pamphlets, maps, prints (among them over fifty early views of Montreal), periodicals, government documents, and broadsides, as well as books.

The Lande Collection contains material on the discovery and exploration of Canada, and its historical development to the end of the nineteenth century. Outstanding among the descriptions of early discoveries are Thevet's Les singularitez de la France antarctique, autrement nommée amerique...(1558) and Wytfliet's Histoire universelle des Indes orientales et occidentales'...(1605), which has some of the earliest maps of Canada. The Jesuit Relations, of which the Collection holds thirteen seventeenth-century editions, are an invaluable primary source for the study of the early French Regime in Canada.

Among other areas of concentration are the search for the Northwest Passage and Arctic exploration, the controversy over Confederation, and early Canadian imprints. One of the highlights of this last group is the first book printed in Montreal, Fleury Mesplet's Réglement de la Confrerie de l'adoration perpétuelle du S. Sacrement et de la bonne mort (1776).

An insight into early Canadian social history is provided by the personal narratives of such travellers as Kalm, Lambert, Weld, Heriot, Landmann, Bonnycastle and by the more than 200 ephemeral items which include broadsides, circulars and sheet music.

== Specialist Subjects ==
One of the most prominent characters featured in Lande's manuscript collections was the 18th-century economist and father of modern finance John Law (1671-1729). Published in the 1980s, Lande's catalogues of 18th-century commerce, trade and exploration contain descriptions of thousands of books, manuscripts, documents and ephemera related to politics, the development of paper money in Europe and North America in the 18th century and draw heavily on his collection of John Law related manuscripts.

The John Law collections build on the methods he established in his instrumental catalogue of Canadiana. He also had an extensive collection of William Blake manuscripts. His collections on Moravian missions to Labrador and on Canadian music, on Martin Buber, and on the American fur trade indicate the variety and extended scope of Lande's interests.

Among correspondence, manuscript compositions, photographs and other records pertaining to L. Lande's fonds at Library and Archives Canada there's an autograph manuscript of the canon Freu Dich Des Lebens by Ludwig van Beethoven, dedicated to T.F. Molt.
