= Fred O'Donovan (actor) =

Irish actor, director and producer

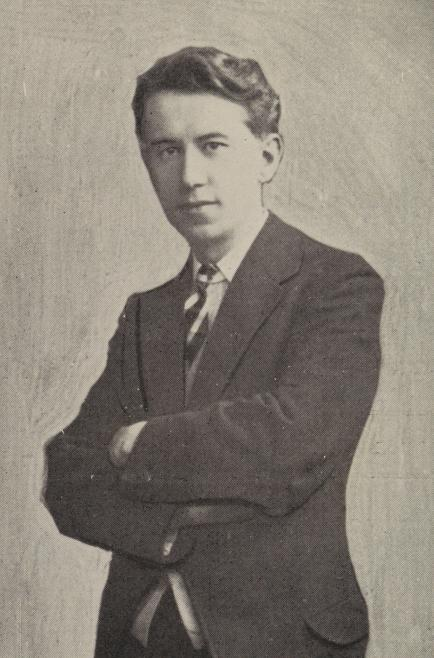
- Born: Dublin, Ireland
- Died: London, England
- Occupation: Actor

Fred O’Donovan (1884–1952) was an Irish actor, early film maker, theatre manager and pioneer of television drama production. For many years he gave the definitive portrayal of the title character in J.M. Synge's The Playboy of the Western World, as well as other prominent roles at Dublin’s Abbey Theatre. He was manager of the Abbey for a time, and appeared in and directed films, television, and on the stage in Britain and abroad before becoming a producer/director in the BBC’s fledgling television service both before and after World War II.

== Early life and career ==
He was born in Dublin in 1884 as Frederick George Saunders. His father was a coachbuilder. He attended the protestant Diocesan Intermediate School, and worked for a time in a land office. He joined the company of the Abbey Theatre in 1908, and was promptly cast in the lead part in The Man Who Missed the Tide, taking the stage name Fred O’Donovan.

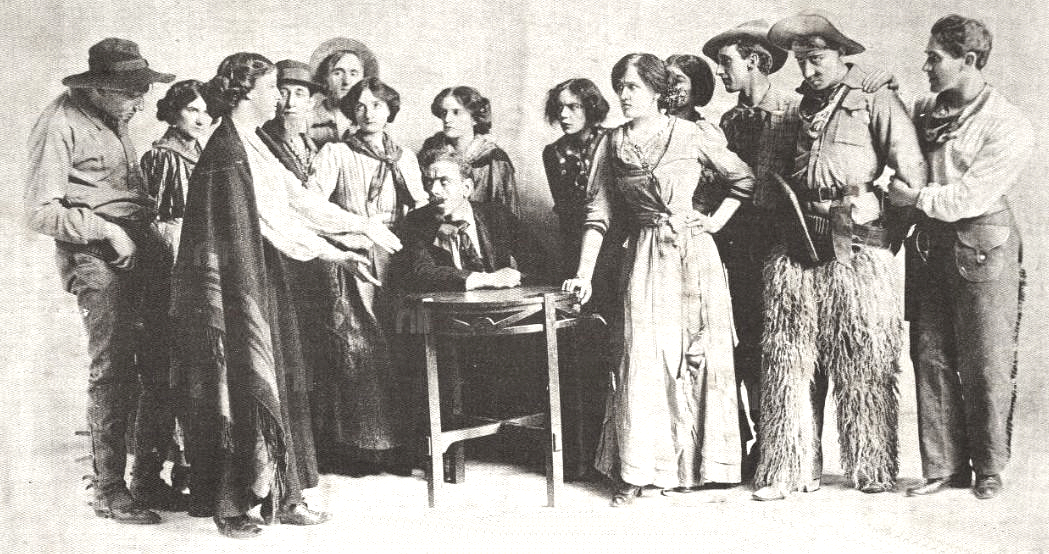
The cast of Blanco Posnet 1913. O'Donovan is second from right, J.M. Kerrigan is extreme right.

The next year he took over the title role in The Playboy of the Western World from W.G. Fay as the Abbey company appeared at the Court Theatre in London. The same year the Abbey was premiering Bernard Shaw's one-act The Shewing-Up of Blanco Posnet because the censor had banned it from London theatres on the grounds of blasphemy, and O'Donovan took the leading part of an American cowboy. He often said it was his favorite role.

In 1911 O'Donovan was again starring in The Playboy of the Western World when the company embarked on its first American tour. Some Irish-Americans objected to the play as disrespectful towards Ireland and there were protests in Boston and New York. Some rioters were arrested, and in Philadelphia not only were rioters arrested but the company were as well, charged with presenting plays likely to corrupt public morals. The charges were later dropped.

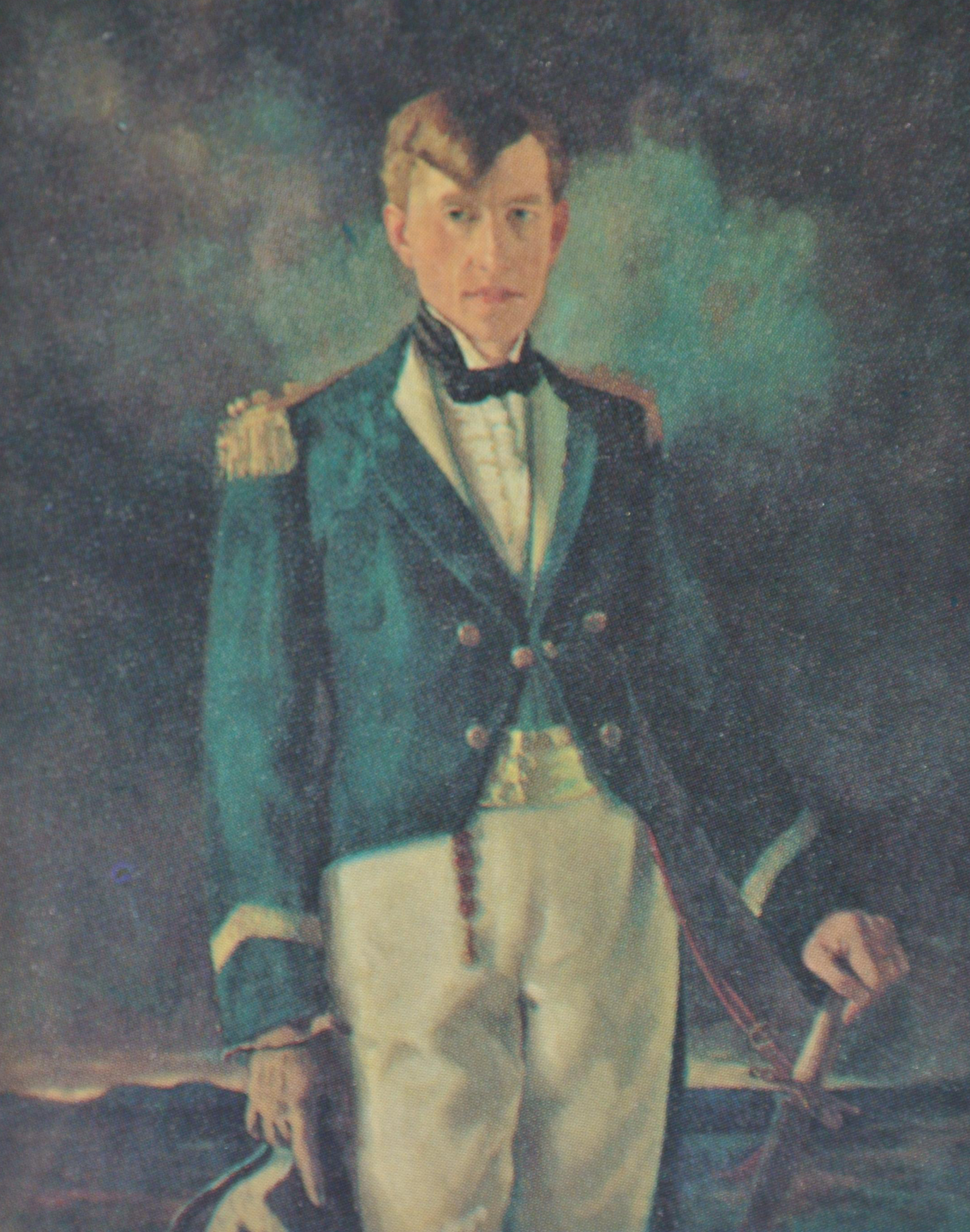
Painting of O'Donovan as Robert Emmet by James Sleator RHA (1915)

O'Donovan continued to appear with the Abbey company in Ireland and England in such plays as Deirdre of the Sorrows, The Countess Cathleen and The Workhouse Ward as well as revivals of the Playboy while taking leading parts in Maurice Harte, The Whiteheaded Boy, John Bull’s Other Island and Man and Superman. He played the revolutionary Robert Emmet in The Dreamers by Lennox Robinson. An oil painting of him in this part hangs in the Abbey Theatre.

== Cinema ==
In 1916 there were plenty of cinemas in Ireland but the (silent) films were nearly all either American or made by American companies visiting Ireland. The Film Company of Ireland was started to change that. O'Donovan, J.M. Kerrigan, O'Donovan’s wife Nora Clancy, and other actors were recruited from the Abbey with the proviso that the work would not interfere with their appearances on stage. The company’s first production was O'Neil of the Glen, a love story directed by Kerrigan with O'Donovan playing the villain. At its opening in Dublin in August, critics and audiences were delighted with the homegrown content. Bioscope commented,

The film, which was expected to prove a good draw, actually surpassed all anticipations, a record being established for the week, and queues being the rule every evening.

Encouraged by the public reaction, Film Company of Ireland proceeded to make a series of comedies in which O'Donovan and the others appeared, followed by a drama, The Eleventh Hour. The next year Kerrigan moved to the United States and O'Donovan took on directing, first the comedy Rafferty’s Rise in which he also took the lead part of a constable. Next he starred in and directed When Love Came to Gavin Burke. Irish Limelight published a detailed description of a day spent at the film shoot, including a cartoon by Frank Leah of O'Donovan directing. The company's next step was to take a major leap forward in ambition: a full-length adaptation of Knocknagow, Charles Kickham's epic novel set in the time of the Irish famine and land clearances in the 19th Century, that was published in 1873. O'Donovan directed and took a supporting role. Commented the critic in the Cavan Anglo-Celt:

With a true appreciation of the artistic, the various degrees of tone have been lifted from the novel, and placed on the screen just as Kickham would have done it himself. The happy peasantry, the prowess of the youth at the hurling match, the hammer-throwing contest, the unexpected "hunt", the love scenes and the comedy – the life as it was before the agent of the absentee landlord came like a dark shadow on the scene, and with crowbar and torch, laid sweet Knocknagow in ruins – all were depicted by the very perfect actors who made up the cast.

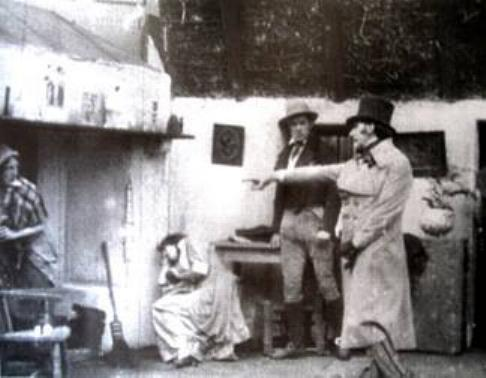
Knocknagow scene 1918

Irish Limelight described the film as a “triumphant” commercial success and pointed up its popularity in the United States. The Dublin Evening Telegraph reported that it was shown for three weeks in Boston and “took more money than the much ‘boosted’ Birth of a Nation”.

Nearly all FCOI's films have since been lost with the exception of Knocknagow, which can be seen on You Tube and at festivals. The Australian online journal Screening the Past has a special issue devoted to Knocknagow with a comprehensive selection of articles and links. O'Donovan made no more silent films and FCOI ceased operations in 1920.

== Managing ==
The management of the Abbey Theatre has been in turmoil for much of its existence. W. B. Yeats and Lady Gregory presided over the Abbey but found it a constant struggle to find the right person to handle the day-to-day workings of the theatre. In March 1917 they decided to ask O'Donovan to take over as manager. He accepted, and also proceeded to assume the directing of the plays, including the first performances of The Lost Leader, Blight and The Parnellite. Peter Kavanagh describes this period:

During his tenure as manager the public showed more active interest than ever before in the Abbey Theatre. There was even a profit to show, although a small one.

A notable event was O'Donovan's bringing on to the company F.J. McCormick, who was to become one of the Abbey’s all-time great stars.

By late 1918 O'Donovan was thinking of moving on. He wanted more money, and was irritated by interference, specifically from Yeats’s newly-married wife Georgie who with no theatre experience would look on at rehearsals and go to Yeats with criticisms. In March 1919 O'Donovan resigned, and several of the longer-serving members of the company left with him. They toured together for a time, and then O'Donovan decided to move to England.

== Moving On ==
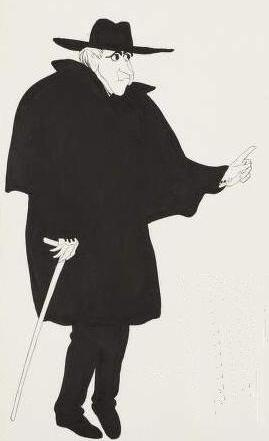
Cartoon by Grace Plunkett of O’Donovan as Father Keegan in John Bull’s Other Island.

Through the 1920s and 1930s O'Donovan appeared in, directed or produced over 80 plays in London. He also toured the British Isles and Southern Africa. In addition to the well-known Irish plays he took the opportunity of increasing his scope. O'Donovan played Aguecheek in Twelfth Night in 1922 and Lopahin in The Cherry Orchard in 1925, both in London. He was also Sir Lucius O’Trigger in The Rivals on BBC radio in 1935. He directed Donald Wolfit and appeared himself in The Moon in the Yellow River. The Times pointed to his portrayal of Father Keegan in Shaw’s John Bull’s Other Island as especially memorable. This was at the Court Theatre in 1921. St John Ervine's Mixed Marriage deals with sectarian strife in Northern Ireland. The Manchester Guardian described O'Donovan’s performance as the labour leader John Rainey: “[He] has a commanding presence. There is about him a dreadful sincerity. Greatly played, as he is here, he is intolerance incarnate.”

Of O'Donovan as Joxer Daly in Juno and the Paycock in 1929, the same critic said: “His portrayal of the furtive sycophant is quintessential."

Of his performance in And So To Bed, The Times commented, “His richness of voice and gesture and his sly fun as Samuel Pepys remain in the memory as something perfect of their kind.” In 1927 the New York impresario Lee Shubert engaged O'Donovan and an entire company, including O'Donovan’s (third) wife Joyce Chancellor, to take the boat to New York and stage the play there. However, after one week’s tryout in Connecticut Shubert decided to replace O'Donovan with an American actor and O'Donovan and Chancellor headed home.

He also worked in film. In Ourselves Alone, about the Irish independence struggle, he played a barman at a pub where the IRA kept its weapons. He had a brief part as a detective in Alfred Hitchcock’s Young and Innocent. Other films included The Vicar of Bray, The House of the Spaniard and General John Regan.

== Critical acclaim ==
Cyril Cusack cited O'Donovan as one of “the greats”. Of a revival of the Playboy in 1925, the Manchester Guardian commented:

O’Donovan still reveals the exquisite marriage of realism and romance which the Abbey Theatre created. He can tell you of the hog in the ditch and the Lady Helen in Paradise with an equally persuasive tone. The audience is lifted, as it were, from the middens of County Mayo to the loftier slopes of Parnassus and hardly knows that it has been translated.

From Ireland’s Abbey Theatre by Lennox Robinson:

Fred O’Donovan from the moment of his first appearance on the stage was an actor par excellence. I don't mean to say that he didn't improve and enrich himself, that he didn’t go from strength to strength, but he didn’t have to grope and stumble for a couple of years as so many players have to do. Barry [Fitzgerald] had to grope and stumble and then suddenly shine out.

During the Abbey’s 1911 US tour O'Donovan was interviewed in his dressing room at Maxine Elliott's Theatre by a journalist from the New York World. This was published under the headline "Aim of Irish Players". In this O'Donovan said,

We seek first of all to act truthfully. Simplicity and naturalness of acting are but a means to obtain that end. There must of course be selection of and emphasis in acting to make the essentials stand out with sufficient boldness to carry the dramatist’s thought into the mind of the audience, but we seek to use as little exaggeration as possible. There is a great danger to the actor in exaggerating, [in that] he will unintentionally heighten his exaggeration, for effect or for applause, until the essential truthfulness of his portrayal becomes lost.

== Television ==
In 1936 the BBC launched the first high-definition television service in the world. It transmitted two hours of TV a day from Alexandra Palace, a Victorian exhibition hall in north London, to a range of about 25 miles around the capital. Drama was to be a major constituent of the programming. O'Donovan was cast in one of the first plays, The Workhouse Ward by Lady Gregory. The Times commented:

Here was a play finely acted and admirably suited to the television screen because of its intimate atmosphere. We were in the workhouse ward with the two old vagabonds and we could note every emotion fluttering across the features of Fred O’Donovan or Harry Hutchinson as they quarrelled deliciously together. It was the whole play, visual and aural, in a way that sound alone can never be.

Once the technology of sending pictures through the ether had been invented, a whole new expertise had to be devised: how to make television programs. The medium was quite different from motion pictures, and even more different from radio and live theatre. The pioneer program makers found themselves inventing their own profession as they went along.

Plays were especially difficult. Everything was live, as there was no video recording, so the filmmaker’s “cut and retake” was out. There could be several cameras, and the director could switch between them during the action, but in the early days this was rather slow because it had to be a “mix” from one shot to another since there was no way of switching instantaneously like a film cut.

So the directors had to work out in detail in advance how the set would be constructed in the studio, how the movement of the actors would be “blocked”, and how the cameras would move around to get the desired sequence of shots. All this had to be done with only two studios. The directors and the engineers often found themselves disagreeing over how something should be done.

In early 1938 the BBC hired O'Donovan as a drama producer, a job now termed "director", and he set rapidly to learn an entirely new job. His first broadcast was Sean O’Casey's one-act comedy The End of the Beginning. His second was Yeats’s mystical verse play Deirdre. The Times wrote that it was “staged by Mr Fred O’Donovan in the style of an ancient saga come to life, beautiful to look at and to listen to, remote and not too strange.”

One of O’Donovan’s cast in Deirdre, playing the part of the Dark-faced Messenger, was Robert Adams, an actor from British Guiana, who soon after starred in The Emperor Jones by Eugene O’Neill, becoming the first black actor to play a leading dramatic role on the new medium of television.

Early on O'Donovan devised a scheme which Denis Johnston describes:

[O'Donovan would] build a house in the center of the studio, with double-sided doors and flats, and as his players moved with beautiful continuity from one room to another, the cameras would pick them up, each in turn, shooting from the outside in. Very nice indeed, until a camera started to act up, and you found that you couldn’t get another one into its place, because of all the scenery in the way.

In October 1938 The Times critic wrote:

Mr Sean O’Casey’s Juno and the Paycock was beautifully presented on the television screen for the first time last week by Mr Fred O’Donovan. Skilful use of the mobility of the cameras allowed shots to be taken of the adjoining room, and of the street door, and of the funeral procession passing by. The future of television seems to lie in extending the stage in this way, and emancipating the production from stage conventions.

After a time O'Donovan came up with the idea of eliminating the mixing between cameras by using only one: dollying up and down from close-up to long shot, walking the actors in and out of vision when they happened to have a line coming, sometimes for as much as 10 or 15 minutes. Commenting on this “One Camera” technique Michael Barry said, “By reducing the mechanical complication to a minimum he obtained a smoothness and a serenity that became the O’Donovan hallmark upon the screen.”

O'Donovan himself told the Radio Times: "Mind you, this means much more work at rehearsals and it is more exacting in that the cast have to be grouped to suit the camera position, but I do contend that this method makes for a smoother and sometimes more polished performance."

Many more plays followed, including the much-anticipated The Fame of Grace Darling, about the Victorian heroine who, with her lighthousekeeper father, saved thirteen people from a shipwreck in 1838. The Observer described O'Donovan’s production of General John Regan as “the most laughter-provoking thing that television has yet given.”

With the start of World War II in September 1939 the television service was closed down, partly so enemy bombers could not radiolocate on the transmissions and partly for the engineers to work on radar. O'Donovan transferred to radio drama as an actor and producer, working on along with much else a selection from Tristram Shandy and the BBC's first family serial, The Robinson Family. In 1944 he was given a leave of absence to appear in The Last of Summer in the West End, with Fay Compton, directed by John Gielgud.

Following the allied victory television started up again in 1946 and O'Donovan returned to Alexandra Palace. Asa Briggs describes continuing doubts and indeed suspicion among radio broadcasters about the value of television, nevertheless the service strove to grow, and by 1950 over 30 hours of programs a week were being transmitted and between 30% and 50% of the British population were within range. O'Donovan was nothing if not ambitious in his choice of plays to televise. Along with Eugene O’Neill’s Anna Christie and Shaw’s Candida came Sierra’s The Kingdom of God and Yeats’s perplexing The Player Queen. He made time to appear in a film Another Shore, directed by Charles Crichton.

In total O'Donovan directed 68 shows on BBC television, and acted in 25 more. None of his television work survives - it was all done before the invention of video recording. There would be a sample, were it not for one wrinkle. One of O'Donovan's most notable productions was The Scarlet Pimpernel, in 1950. The Manchester Guardian said “The cramping limitations of television dissolved a little before Fred O'Donovan's clever production." It was decided to preserve the piece and a film camera was set up in front of a monitor. The next day came an irate phone call from the movie mogul Sir Alexander Korda, who claimed to own the film rights for the story, and demanded that the BBC's footage be destroyed. It was.

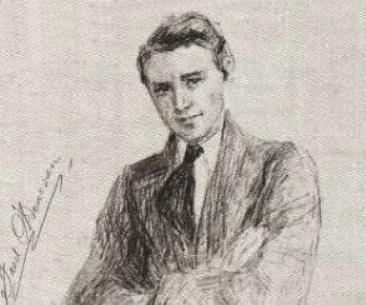
Drawing by John Butler Yeats, New York 1911

In 1951 O'Donovan began having health problems. The following year he was invited to Paris to demonstrate his one-camera technique and direct an adaptation of Rebecca. A few weeks after returning he entered hospital in Northwood for surgery on an obstructed intestine. He contracted pneumonia, and died on 19 July 1952, aged 68. He was cremated at Golders Green Crematorium and his ashes were scattered there.

== Personal life ==
He was married three times, first in 1912 to Lilian Golding, who acted with the Abbey and in several films from FCOI as Nora Clancy. Later that decade O'Donovan started a liaison with Muriel Jameson, daughter of a Dublin journalist. The two were living in England when they had a son, Paul, who was born in 1920. Lilian/Nora sued for divorce, and O'Donovan and Jameson married in 1922. Muriel died of pulmonary tuberculosis in 1924, aged 25. In 1927 O'Donovan married the Irish actress Joyce Chancellor, with whom he had a daughter, Joyceann. Flying Officer Paul Saunders was killed in action with the RAF in World War II.

== Postscript ==
Lennox Robinson tells how he was on a trip to London in 1931 when Hazel Lady Lavery invited him to a luncheon at which one of the guests would be the Labour Prime Minister Ramsay MacDonald. O'Donovan was in a play of Robinson’s in London at the time and on hearing about this he exclaimed that of all people in the world MacDonald was the one he wanted to meet. An invitation was forthcoming. What transpired between actor and statesman history does not relate.

== Sources and further reading ==
- Who Was Who in the Theatre 1912-1976 (1978) Gale Research.
- Hunt, Hugh (1979) The Abbey, Ireland’s National Theatre, 1904-1979. Gill & Macmillan, Dublin.
- Robinson, Lennox (1951) Ireland’s Abbey Theatre, a history, 1899-1951 Sidgwick & Jackson, London
- Kavanagh, Peter (1950) The Story of the Abbey Theatre Devin-Adair, New York.
- Mikhail, E.H. ed. (1988) The Abbey Theatre: Interviews and Recollections. Macmillan
- Barr, Charles (2016) "Fred O'Donovan: not just Knocknagow"
- Rockett, Kevin et al. (1988) Cinema and Ireland, Syracuse University Press.
- Cain, John. (1992) The BBC: 70 Years of Broadcasting. BBC London.
- Johnston, Denis (1992) “Is this an art or a toy?” in Orders and Desecrations. Lilliput Press.
- Briggs, Asa (1985) The BBC - The First Fifty Years. Oxford
- Wyver, John (2017) "Exploring the Lost Television and Technique of Producer Fred O’Donovan", Historical Journal of Film, Radio and Television, 37:1, 5-23, DOI:
- Wyver, John (2011) "Introducing Fred O'Donovan"
- Jacobs, Jason (2000) The Intimate Screen. Oxford
