= The Clancy Name =

1908 play by Lennox Robinson

The Clancy Name is a 1908 play by Irish playwright Lennox Robinson. It was his first produced play. It was produced under the name SL Robinson.

== Production history ==
The play was first produced by the Abbey Theatre in 1908.

The play was produced by the Abbey Theatre in August 1924 for 7 performances as part of a double bill with The Two Shepherds by Gregorio Martinez Sierra. The production was directed by Michael J. Dolan.

The play was produced by the Abbey Theatre in December 1942 for 13 performances. The production was directed by Frank Dermody.
