= Ken Starr (disambiguation) =

Ken Starr (1946–2022) was an American lawyer, educational administrator, and federal judge.

Ken Starr or Kenneth Starr may also refer to:

- Kenn Starr, American rapper
- Kenny Starr (born 1952), American country singer
- Kenneth I. Starr (born 1943/1944), American former certified public accountant and disbarred attorney

== See also ==
- Kenneth Sarr (1895–1967), Irish writer and judge
