= Dolly Robinson =

Irish artist and theatre designer (1901–1977)

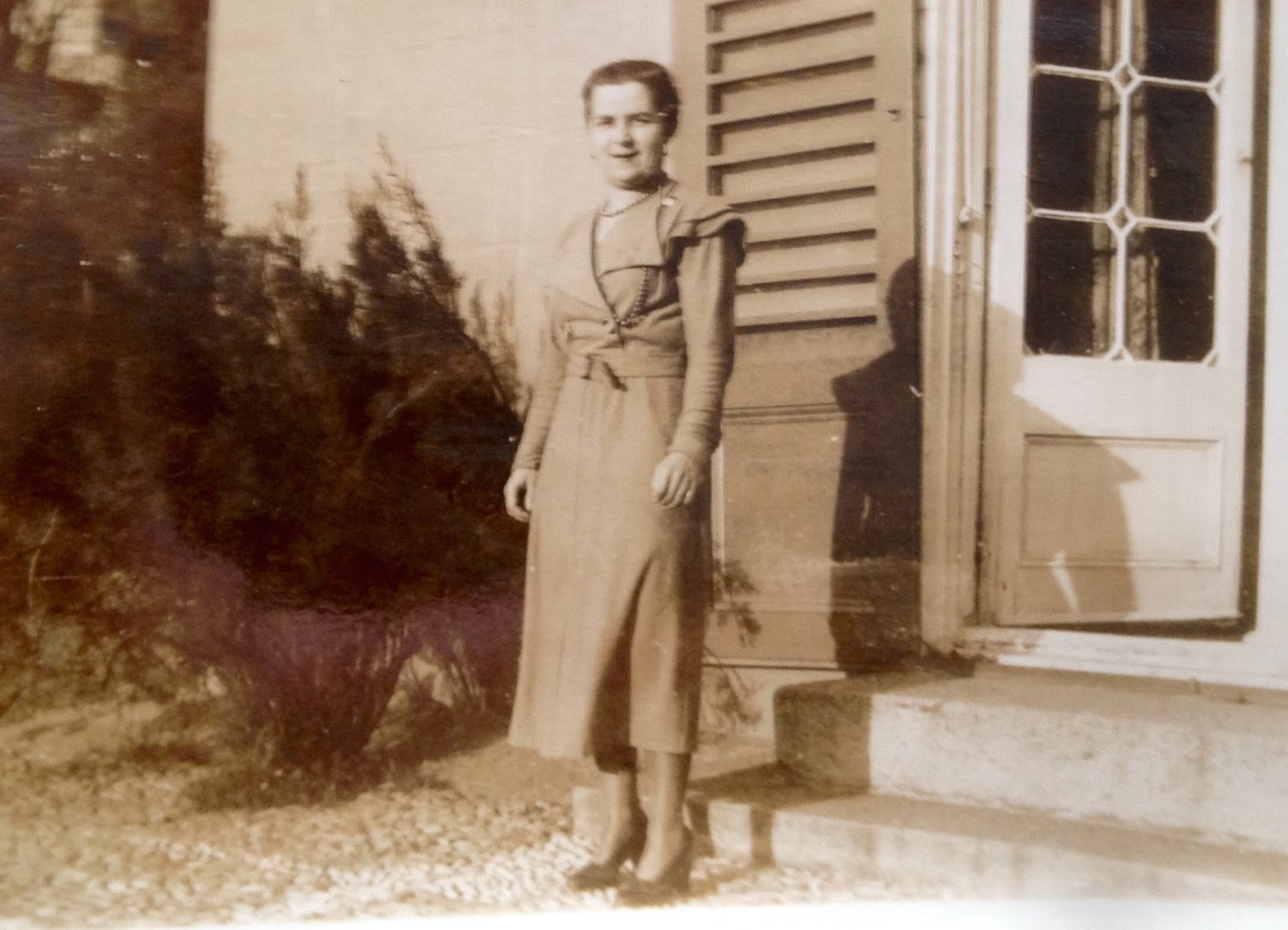
- Dolly Robinson in Cannes, 1937
- Born: Dorothy Travers Smith; 26 October 1901; Dublin
- Died: 4 November 1977 (aged 76)
- Education: Chelsea College of Arts
- Known for: Artist, theatrical costumer and designer
- Spouse: Lennox Robinson (m. 1931)

Dolly Robinson (born Dorothy Travers Smith; 26 October 1901 – 4 November 1977) was an Irish artist and theatre designer.

== Early life ==
Dolly Robinson was born Dorothy Travers Smith in Dublin on 26 October 1901. She was the daughter of Richard Travers Smith MD, FRCPI and Hester (née Dowden). Her maternal grandfather was Edward Dowden, a noted literary critic. Robinson initially studied art with Estella Solomons, going on to attend Chelsea College of Arts in London, living with her mother at Cheyne Gardens.

== Career ==
She moved into theatre design, and in 1926 designed the set of the Abbey Theatre's staging of The Emperor Jones by Eugene O'Neill. In 1927 the Abbey commissioned her again to design the costumes for George Bernard Shaw's Caesar and Cleopatra. As a result of this work the Abbey commissioned her to produce set and costume designs, and she worked with the Theatre continuously between 1927 and 1935.

For the Abbey's first attempt at a Shakespeare play, King Lear, in 1928, Travers Smith futurist designs were employed. She also worked on Yeats' Fighting the Waves, for which Ninette de Valois was the choreographer, and on Fedelma, as well as on G. B. Shaw's John Bull's Other Island, and on future husband Lennox Robinson's Ever the Twain. In Robinson's autobiography, he recalled Travers Smith working with Norah McGuinness on the design for Plays for Dancers. She showed one work in the Royal Hibernian Academy in 1936 and had a solo show in 1938.

Robinson established her studio, nicknamed "the grimery", on North Frederick Street, Dublin. Harry Clarke's studio was on the same street, and Robinson also became friends with Thomas MacGreevy and the Yeats family. She believed that she had inherited some psychic ability, and practised automatic writing. W. B. Yeats incorporated one of her spirits, Thomas of Odessa, into his poem Vision. Yeats gave her the nickname "Chinatown" owing to her slightly Asian looks. Yeats said to her in 1929 'you combine aesthetic sensitivities and novelty with a grasp of the necessities of the stage'. Micheál Mac Liammóir described her in his autobiography as 'easy to know, bubbling with good nature, barbed with wit.'

Robinson designed the costumes for two Abbey productions by Yeats in 1934: The resurrection and The king of the clock tower. In 1936, she exhibited with the Royal Hibernian Academy for the only time with Bungalows. She exhibited 49 works, including numerous Irish landscapes, at 7 St Stephen's Green in 1938. In 1943 she exhibited Donegal in March at the Irish Exhibition of Living Art. Robinson was a member of the Dublin United Arts Club, organising exhibitions. She was the curator for the Joyce Museum, Sandycove for a short period in the 1960s.

== Marriage and later life ==
She married Lennox Robinson on 8 September 1931 in the Chelsea registry office, with the couple honeymooning in America as the Abbey toured there. Upon their return to Dublin, they settled into Sorrento Cottage, Dalkey. Due to Lennox's homosexuality and alcoholism, the marriage was an unhappy one. The couple had no children. Robinson also drank excessively. The couple left Sorrento Cottage around 1949, and moved to a flat on Longford Terrace, Monkstown. Robinson died on 4 November 1977 in a Dublin nursing home. She was buried at St Patrick's Cathedral, Dublin with her husband.

The Crawford Art Gallery holds her 1935 painting Cordyline palms, and a charcoal drawing of her by Margaret Clarke. The correspondence of Robinson and Lennox is among the collections in the Library of Trinity College Dublin.
