= Seven Days to Noon =

1950 British film by John Boulting and Roy Boulting

- Theatrical release poster
- Directed by: John Boulting; Roy Boulting
- Written by: Paul Dehn (story); James Bernard (story); Frank Harvey (screenplay); Roy Boulting (screenplay)
- Produced by: John Boulting; Roy Boulting
- Starring: Barry Jones; Olive Sloane; André Morell; Sheila Manahan; Hugh Cross
- Cinematography: Gilbert Taylor
- Edited by: John Boulting; Roy Boulting
- Music by: John Addison
- Production companies: London Film Productions; Boulting Brothers
- Distributed by: British Lion Films
- Release dates: 30 October 1950 (UK); 18 December 1950 (USA)
- Running time: 96 minutes
- Country: United Kingdom
- Language: English

Seven Days to Noon (also known as Ultimatum) is a 1950 British political thriller film directed and produced by John and Roy Boulting and starring Barry Jones, Olive Sloane and André Morell. It was written by Frank Harvey and Roy Boulting based on a story by Paul Dehn and James Bernard.

The British Prime Minister is blackmailed by a man who has stolen a nuclear weapon and threatens to destroy London.

== Plot ==
In 1950, one Monday, the British Prime Minister receives a letter from a man who says he has stolen a nuclear weapon and will destroy the centre of London next Sunday at noon, unless the British government declares that the country is going to stop making such devices. The letter is signed "Professor Willingdon", which is the name of the senior researcher at Britain's atomic weapons development facility, the fictitious Wallingford Research Centre; Detective Superintendent Folland of Scotland Yard's Special Branch is charged with investigating whether the letter is a fraud or represents a genuine threat.

At the Research Centre, Folland finds that Willingdon has gone missing, as has a (fictitious) UR12 nuclear bomb, which is small enough and light enough for an individual to carry. He recruits Stephen Lane, Willingdon's assistant, to help with the search, and they go to Willingdon's house. Neither Lane, nor Willingdon's wife or daughter, Ann, had noticed anything unusual in the Professor's recent behavior, but troubling notes are found among his papers which, coupled with some remarks he made to the local vicar, who is the last person known to have spoken with Willingdon, indicate he had come to believe that his life's work was being used by the government for evil purposes.

On Tuesday, Willingdon, who is carrying the bomb around with him in a Gladstone bag, sees his picture in the newspaper (though it is not stated why he is wanted), so he has a barber shave off his moustache before looking for a place to stay. He rents a room from Mrs Peckett, but spooks her by pacing around his room all night. After he has left the next morning, she sees an article about the hunt for someone who is killing landladies, so she calls the police. A quick-thinking constable realises the description matches Willingdon, and a car is sent to the boarding house. Willingdon returns, but he sees the police car parked outside the building and is able to make a quiet getaway.

Willingdon throws away his overcoat and goes to a pawn shop to buy another one. There, he meets Goldie, an actress whose best days are behind her, and her dog, Trixie. The trio are reunited that evening when Trixie gets away from Goldie and leads her to Willingdon. They go to a pub and, when it closes for the night, Goldie invites Willingdon to her apartment, as he has no lodgings. He sleeps on her spare bed and leaves before she wakes up in the morning.

The recent unscheduled Cabinet meetings and indications of an impending mass mobilisation have not gone unnoticed by the press. By Thursday, rumours of war are circulating and there is a growing crowd outside 10 Downing Street, so the Prime Minister decides to finally make a statement over the radio. He reveals the threat and announces an evacuation of the 12 square miles around Parliament, to begin the next morning. When this is complete Army units will begin a search of central London, beginning at the edge of the evacuation area and moving towards the centre.

Goldie sees one of the increasing number of posters with Willingdon's face on it and goes to the police. When she gets home to pack for the evacuation, she finds Willingdon waiting for her—the ever-intensifying search has made him nervous, so he has decided to hold Goldie hostage in her apartment, saying he will blow up the bomb prematurely if she calls for help.

The evacuation (of people, as well as important cultural artifacts) proceeds smoothly. When the systematic military search reaches Goldie's street on Saturday night, Willingdon escapes out a window. Shortly before noon on Sunday, he is found, praying in a church that was seriously damaged during The Blitz. Folland and Lane rush over, bringing Ann to try to talk Willingdon out of his plan. He says it is too late to change his mind, but she sees his bag across the room and calls for help. Willingdon is restrained and Lane begins to defuse the bomb. Screaming that it is "Too late", Willingdon breaks free, runs from the church, and is killed by a nervous soldier. As the clock strikes twelve, Lane finishes disarming the UR12. Goldie, who is on Westminster Bridge attempting to hitch a ride to Aldershot hears the all-clear sirens and heads for home.

== Main cast ==
- Barry Jones as Professor John Willingdon
- Olive Sloane as Goldie Phillips
- André Morell as Superintendent Folland
- Sheila Manahan as Ann Willingdon, Professor Willingdon's daughter
- Hugh Cross as Stephen 'Steve' Lane
- Joan Hickson as Mrs Emily Georgina Peckett, a landlady
- Ronald Adam as the Rt Hon Arthur Lytton, Prime Minister
- Marie Ney as Mrs Willingdon, Professor Willingdon's wife
- Wyndham Goldie as Reverend Burgess, the vicar of Wallingford
- Russell Waters as Detective Davis
- Martin Boddey as General Willoughby
- Frederick Allen as himself, a BBC radio announcer
- Victor Maddern as Private Jackson
- Geoffrey Keen as Alf, the loudmouth in the pub
- Merrill Mueller as himself, the American NBC radio commentator in London
- Joss Ackland as Young Policeman at the Police Station (uncredited)
- Jean Anderson as Mother at Railway Station (uncredited)
- Ernest Clark as Barber (uncredited)
- Maurice Colbourne as Ministry Official (uncredited)
- Colin Douglas as soldier in house search (uncredited)
- Sam Kydd as soldier in house Search (uncredited)
- Bruce Seton as Brigadier Grant (uncredited)
- Marianne Stone as woman in phone box (uncredited)
- Ian Wilson as sandwich-board Man (uncredited)

== Production ==
The film was based on a story by journalist Paul Dehn and musician James Bernard, neither of whom was a screenwriter at the time. Roy Boulting produced and edited, and John Boulting directed (although in the credits, both brothers are credited with performing all three tasks). The brothers described the story as "Guy Fawkes in modern dress", and deliberately did not cast any stars in the leads, as they felt the story would be more believable that way. During filming, John Boulting said: "We don't want any stars. They would be a positive hindrance. Those old familiar faces, and old familiar tricks and gestures, would entirely destroy the illusion we have created. Only my brother and I know the full story of Seven Days to Noon. Even our players haven't seen the entire script. We're keeping it secret until it's ready for sale."

Production began in July 1949, with the cooperation of the War Office and the police. Location filming took place in London over several weeks, including at Westminster Bridge, Lambeth Grove, and Trafalgar Square Underground station; walkie-talkies were used to help control traffic on the bridge. For the film, Gilbert Taylor was influenced by the photography of The Naked City (1948).

In a sequel to the film André Morell again portrayed Superintendent Folland in High Treason (1951).

== Critical reception ==
The film performed reasonably well at the box office. It was one of a string of financially successful films from Alexander Korda's production and distribution companies following a series of flops.

Variety said: "Barry Jones' interpretation of the scientist is intelligent. His clearly defined portrait of the man no one understands is a moving piece of acting. ... The actors are aided by a first-rate script. Dialog is consistently pithy, with few chances for laughs overlooked, despite the seriousness of the theme."

Monthly Film Bulletin wrote: "Seven Days to Noon is a first class thriller with a theme of alarming topicality. The script does not make the mistake of opening on too high a note of excitement, and the transition from the common sense routine work of the opening scenes to the high tension of the last day of the hunt is admirably achieved."

In The Spectator Virginia Graham said: "Mr Barry Jones and Miss Olive Sloane give outstanding performances, the script is both witty and wise, and if, perhaps, the London Police do not emerge with flying colours, flags can be run up for all other participants in this giant game of hide and seek".

In British Sound Films: The Studio Years 1928–1959 David Quinlan rated the film as "very good", writing: "Suspenseful thriller with a sense of urgency in every foot."

Leslie Halliwell said: "Persuasively understated suspense piece which was subsequently much copied, so that it now seems rather obvious."

== Awards ==
The film received the Academy Award for Best Story (Paul Dehn and James Bernard) at the 24th Academy Awards (1952).

== DVD release ==
The film was released on DVD in 2008.
