= Another Shore =

1948 film by Charles Crichton

- Film poster
- Directed by: Charles Crichton
- Written by: Kenneth Reddin (story); Walter Meade (screenplay)
- Produced by: Michael Balcon; Ivor Montagu
- Starring: Robert Beatty; Moira Lister; Stanley Holloway
- Cinematography: Douglas Slocombe
- Edited by: Bernard Gribble
- Music by: Georges Auric
- Production company: Ealing Studios
- Distributed by: General Film Distributors (UK)
- Release date: 20 December 1948 (UK)
- Running time: 77 minutes
- Country: United Kingdom
- Language: English
- Budget: £180,936
- Box office: £35,371 (UK)

Another Shore is a 1948 Ealing Studios comedy film directed by Charles Crichton. It stars Robert Beatty as Gulliver Shields, an Irish customs official who dreams of living on a South Sea island; particularly Rarotonga. It is based on the 1947 novel by Kenneth Sheils Reddin, an Irish judge.

== Plot ==
The opening credits initially say "a comedy" but this is changed to "a tragedy". The orchestra plays Molly Malone as credits roll on a background of shamrocks telling the viewer that the setting is Ireland.

Gulliver Sheils has left his career with the Revenue Commissioners in Dublin due to receiving a small pension. He spends every day but Sunday sitting at a park bench in St Stephen's Green hoping to help a fallen wealthy elderly person who will reward him with enough money to finance his one way trip to Rarotonga where he will spend the remainder of his days lolling about in the South Seas. On Sunday he loafs on an Irish beach fantasising about living in Rarotonga. There he meets an attractive Anglo-Irish woman named Jennifer. She becomes intrigued that Gulliver is the first man to ignore her.

The next week, a refined Scottish gentleman, Alastair McNeil sits next to him for some minutes before going to a bar. Gulliver goes to a different bar. A very quiet one. He reads a newspaper article about a car crash on Grafton Street; he realises that that location would give him a better opportunity for his scheme. He then goes to the street and waits for the next accident, but when two women crash he declines to be a witness. He waits a week on the courtroom steps .. the woman eventually sees him .. they had met before on a beach. He goes to meet her later in a bar with her friends.

He resumes his stance on the steps of the bank on Grafton Street but is harassed due to his continual presence. Acquiring a small performing dog from an ill street busker partly resolves this. He is happy when the next accident happens: an old lady is hit by a car while crossing. He helps her hoping for a reward but is only given a luncheon voucher.

The girl Jennifer passes somewhat tipsy and asks him to call a taxi. He joins her and they go to her palatial home. Over dinner he at last explains his plan. In his mind, he will rescue and they will reward him with an amount of money to get him to the South Seas. She clearly likes him but he runs off.

He returns to his position on Grafton Street. The next accident is a Rolls-Royce hitting a boy on a bicycle. The man (the same man who earlier sat by him in the park) in the car claims the greater injury. They go to a bar together. They appear to have parallel dreams except Gulliver seeks Rarotonga and the man wishes Tahiti. They meet a third time in a lawyers office when the man goes to bewail the loss of his wife: running away with his chauffeur. A plan to go together to the South Seas is formulated to the dismay of Jennifer.

On the way to the boat their car crashes on Grafton Street. Gulliver breaks his arm. Jennifer arrives and her friend Yellow takes Gulliver's place on the trip. Gulliver stays with Jennifer who he marries with Gulliver returning to his job.

== Main cast ==
- Robert Beatty as Gulliver Sheils
- Moira Lister as Jennifer
- Stanley Holloway as Alastair McNeil, the rich man
- Michael Medwin as "Yellow" Bingham
- Sheila Manahan as Nora
- Fred O'Donovan as Coghlan
- Maureen Delany as Mrs Gleeson
- Dermot Kelly as Boxer
- Irene Worth as Bucsy Vere-Brown
- Bill Shine as Bats Vere-Brown
- Muriel Aked as Old lady
- Wilfrid Brambell as Arthur Moore, the lawyer
- Michael J. Dolan as Twiss

== Production ==
Another Shore was filmed on location in Dublin in Ireland.

== Reception ==
=== Critical ===
The Monthly Film Bulletin wrote: "The acting is good generally, but Stanley Holloway is more outstanding than most of the rest of the cast. The rowdy carnival-fair scene rather spoils the film, and the young man's dream of the islands points a little to the ridiculous. The comedy and the serious side do not blend very well, but Robert Beatty's dry humour is very clever. The film is very ably produced and directed."

=== Box office ===
The film earned distributor's gross receipts of £35,371 in the UK of which £24,804 went to the producer. The film made a loss of £155,900.
