= Hester Dowden =

Irish medium (1868–1949)

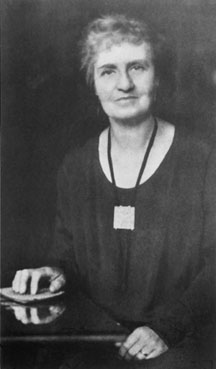
- Hester Dowden
- Born: 1868; Dublin, Ireland
- Died: 1949 (aged 80–81)
- Occupations: Spiritualist; Author
- Known for: Mediumship; Occultism
- Spouse: Dr. Travers Smith
- Children: Dorothy Travers Smith

Hester Dowden (1868–1949), also known as Hester Travers Smith, was an Irish spiritualist medium who is most notable for having claimed to contact the spirits of Oscar Wilde, William Shakespeare and other writers. Dowden's writings were published by various authors. She wrote Voices from the Void (1919), an account of her life as a medium, and Psychic Messages from Oscar Wilde (1924).

Dowden was the daughter of the Irish literary scholar Edward Dowden. She used both her maiden name and her married name Hester Travers Smith. Her husband was a prominent Dublin physician. Dowden was closely linked to the Irish literary world through her father, knowing, among others W. B. Yeats and Bram Stoker. She was probably the model for the medium in Yeats's play, The Words upon the Window Pane. Her daughter, the Abbey Theatre stage designer Dorothy Travers-Smith, married the playwright Lennox Robinson. Though she wrote only two books under her own name, her writings provided the basis for approximately twelve books published by other authors.

== Early life ==
Dowden had intended to become a musician. In 1891 she moved to London to study music, but was forced to travel back to Dublin to look after her father when her mother died. When her father remarried in 1895, Dowden clashed with his new wife. Within a few months she had moved out of the house to marry Dr. Travers Smith. The marriage was not a success. The couple eventually separated and were divorced in 1916. They had one son, Edward Travers Smith, and one daughter, Dorothy Travers Smith. Dowden moved back to London, becoming a professional medium in 1921.

== Mediumship claims ==
Dowden claimed to communicate via various spirit guides, "Peter" (an Irish-American rogue), "Eyen" (an ancient Egyptian priest), "Astor" (also another medium's guide), "Shamar" (a Hindu), and finally "Johannes." The last was an ancient Jewish neo-Platonist who lived 200 years before Jesus.

She was closely associated with William Fletcher Barrett, the psychical researcher. She was also responsible for introducing Geraldine Cummins to mediumship.

Dowden set up as a professional medium after she became convinced of her powers. In Voices from the Void she claimed that the spirit of Hugh Lane, who had drowned in the sinking of the Lusitania, spoke to her before she knew of his death in the disaster. Her son-in-law Lennox Robinson and a vicar were present when the communication came through. However, Lane's death had been reported in the papers that very day. Dowden claimed not to have read them.

=== Oscar Wilde ===
Dowden claimed to communicate with the spirit of Oscar Wilde and published her "conversations" in 1923. According to her, Wilde revealed that he was unable to read in the spirit world and had to see through the eyes of living people, "Over the whole world have I wandered, looking for eyes by which I might see. . . . Through the eyes out of the dusky face of a Tamal girl I have looked on the tea fields of Ceylon, and through the eyes of a wandering Kurd I have seen Ararat and the Yezedes. . . . It may surprise you to learn that in this way I have dipped into the works of some of your modern novelists." He also gave his views on the work of these recent writers, including George Bernard Shaw, of whom Wilde said, "I have a very great respect for his work. After all, he is my fellow-countryman. We share the same misfortune in that matter. I think Shaw may be called the true type of pleb. He is so anxious to prove himself honest and outspoken that he utters a great deal more than he is able to think. He is ever ready to call upon his audience to admire his work, and his audience admires it from sheer sympathy with his delight." He opined that John Galsworthy was the best modern dramatist. He dismissed Thomas Hardy as a "harmless rustic" but admired George Meredith for his appreciation of beauty. He loathed James Joyce's novel Ulysses, which was a "great bulk of filth" and "heated vomit".

She claimed Wilde also demonstrated that he had no homosexual inclinations, but instead revealed his utter adoration of womankind. "My sensations were so varied with regard to your sex, dear lady, that you would find painted on my heart – that internal organ so often quoted by the vulgar – you would find every shade of desire there, and even more... Women were ever to me a cluster of stars. They contained for me all, and more than all, that God has created." Dowden also received a new play, entitled Is it a Forgery?, from Wilde, which was written in the spirit world.

James Joyce read the book and parodied the conversations with Wilde in Finnegans Wake, in which Wilde spouts gibberish to a medium, "Tell the woyld I have lived true thousand hells. Pity, please, lady, for poor O.W. in this profundust snobbing I have caught. Nine dirty years mine age, hairs hoar, mummeries failend, snowdrift to my elpow, deff as Adder. I askt you, dear lady, to judge on my tree by our fruits. I gave you of the tree."

=== Francis Bacon ===
After Dowden was consulted by Alfred Dodd, a writer who wanted to prove that Francis Bacon was the true author of the works attributed to William Shakespeare, Dowden claimed to communicate with Bacon via her spirit guide "Johannes". According to Dowden, the spirits confirmed Dodd's theory, which he published in 1943.

Dowden was later contacted by Percy Allen who wanted to prove that Shakespeare's works were written by Edward de Vere, Earl of Oxford, not Bacon. On this occasion the "spirits" confirmed Allen's views. It was "revealed" that Oxford was the leader of a collaborative effort among poets and scholars to create the works. Another "revelation" was that Oberon in A Midsummer Night's Dream was a portrait of Henry Wriothesley, 3rd Earl of Southampton, who was in fact the illegitimate son of Oxford and Queen Elizabeth I.

The "spirit of Bacon" told Allen that he had been misquoted when Dowden had received the messages she passed on to Dodd, but that Dowden was not to blame because another spirit had garbled the message on that occasion. Dowden's biographer Edmund Bentley later confirmed that Allen's was the final and true revelation, that from his teenage years Allen had been destined to be the bearer of the ultimate truth: "a plan had been worked out by spirit people interested in his earthly life that he should be the means of finally unravelling the great mystery of Shakespeare's origin and work." These events forced Allen to stand down as president of the Oxfordian organisation the Shakespeare Fellowship.

=== World War II leaders ===
In 1941 Dowden, who was living in Chelsea, London at the time, claims to have received messages from "Johannes" commenting on the personalities of the principal national leaders during World War II. These were conveyed to the writer Peter Fripp as analyses of the motives and actions of Hitler and Stalin, Churchill and Roosevelt. Seen from the spirit-world, Dowd claimed Hitler was not evil but rather "a man whose stars threw him into the world with vast disadvantages, with overwhelming ambition sweltering in his soul, and with an infinite capacity for receiving influences and suggestions from our side." She maintained that, open to spirit influence, Hitler was a passive recipient of dangerous spirits working on his "colossal egotism" so that he became a conduit for evil. Stalin, in contrast, was described by her as "crafty and careful" rather than egotistic. Churchill, she claimed, "can be hot-headed, full of zeal and enthusiasm, and, at the same time, never lose his balance in the least." Roosevelt, she said, is an "intricate personality" who is "affectionate, and has a genuine love for the human race. He is not fond of adventure, as Churchill is, but he would not shirk risks if he felt they might set things in the right direction."
