= Sheila Manahan =

Irish actress (1924–1988)

- Manahan in Seven Days to Noon
- Born: 1 January 1924; Dublin, Ireland
- Died: 29 March 1988 (aged 64); London, England
- Occupation: Actress
- Years active: 1948–1988
- Spouse(s): James Stafford Northcote (m. 1949; div. 1961) Fulton Mackay (m. 1961; died 1987)

Sheila Manahan (1 January 1924 – 29 March 1988) was an Irish actress on stage and screen. She was associated with the Abbey Theatre in Dublin in the 1940s, and had supporting roles at least ten films between 1948 and 1965. She also acted in radio productions and television programs.

== Early life ==
Manahan was born in Dublin on New Year's Day in 1924, the daughter of Captain John Manahan. She attended Scoil Mhuire, and was bilingual in Irish and English. She began acting in plays as a teenager.

== Career ==
Manahan was an actress with the Abbey Theatre in Dublin during World War II. In 1948 she was in the original cast of Christopher Fry's The Lady's Not For Burning, in London. In 1952 she starred in Margaret Macloud's comedy Quest in London. On radio she acted in Sean O'Casey plays.

Among her film roles were Shelah Flaherty in Saints and Sinners (1949), Ann Willingdon in Seven Days to Noon (1950), Rose Moresby (sister to Jean Simmons's character and wife to William Hartnell's character) in Footsteps in the Fog (1955), Esther's mother in The Story of Esther Costello (1957), and Mrs. Jenkins in Only Two Can Play (1962), with Peter Sellers and Mai Zetterling. On television, she was in an adaptation of Frank O'Connor's 1939 story "First Confession", broadcast on Thirty-Minute Theatre in 1969. Her last television role was as Peter Blake's mother in Dear John.

== Personal life ==
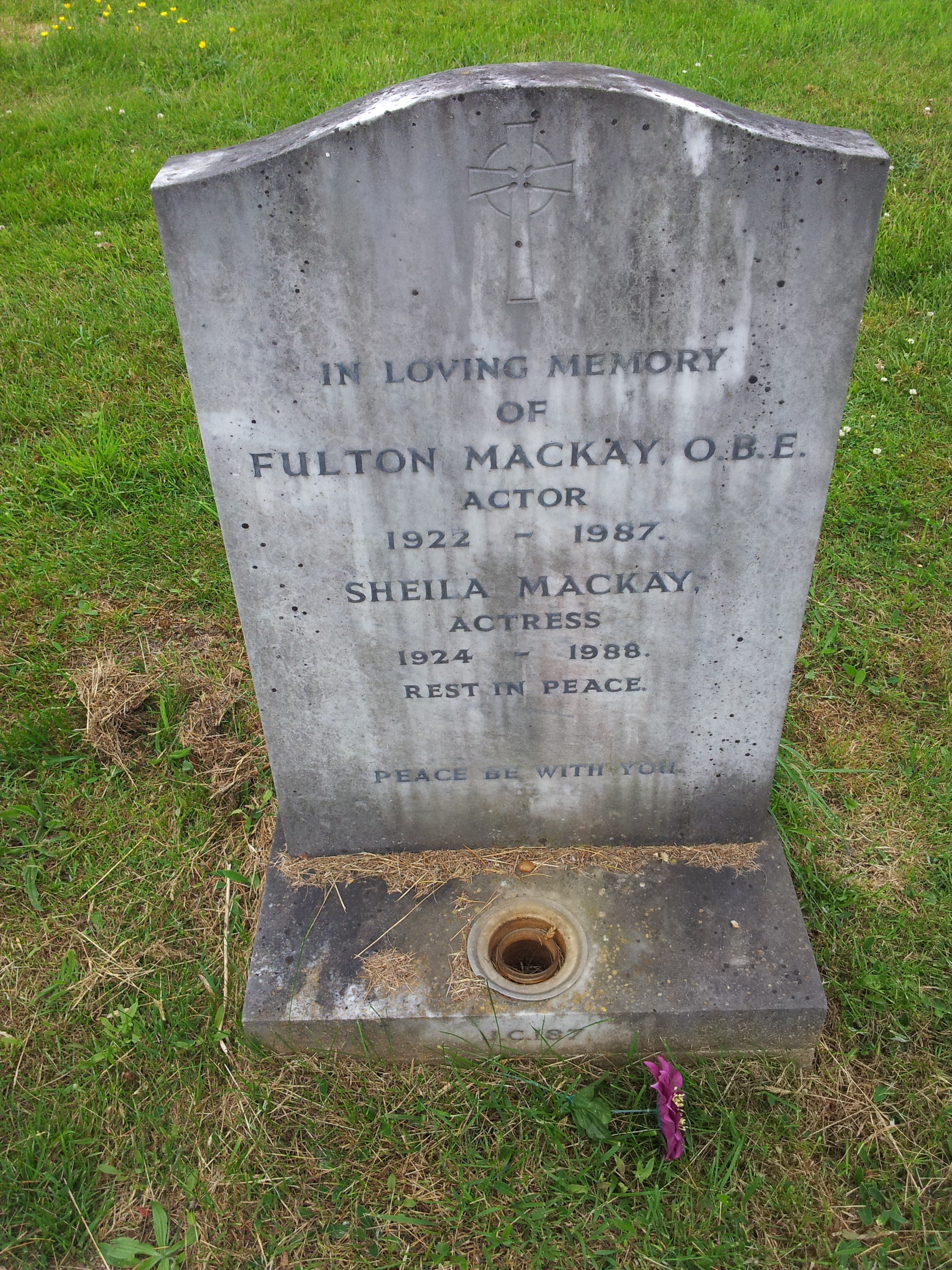
Manahan and her husband Fulton Mackay's grave in East Sheen Cemetery, Richmond upon Thames, London

Manahan married film technician James Stafford Northcote in 1949; they divorced in 1961. In 1961 she married her second husband, the Scottish actor Fulton Mackay. "They were an incredible welcoming, inclusive couple", recalled actor Brian Cox in 2022. "They were like my real family, my surrogate parents in many ways." Her husband died from stomach cancer in 1987 at the age of 64, and she died from colon cancer in west London on 29 March 1988, also at the age of 64. They are buried together in East Sheen Cemetery in southwest London.

== Filmography ==
=== Film ===
Year	Title	Role
1948	Another Shore	Nora
1949	Saints and Sinners	Shelah Flaherty
1950	Seven Days to Noon	Ann Willingdon
1955	Footsteps in the Fog	Rose Moresby
1956	The Last Man to Hang	Senior sister
1957	Seven Waves Away	Woman on raft
1957	The Story of Esther Costello	Esther's mother
1962	Only Two Can Play	Mrs Jenkins
1965	Young Cassidy	first neighbour

=== Television ===
Year	Title	Role	Notes
1960	The Secret Kingdom	Anne Byron	8 episodes
1962	Probation Officer	Iris Carson	1 episode
1964	Dixon of Dock Green	Mrs. MacBride	Episode: "Facing the Music"
1965	The Scales of Justice	Jean Turner	Episode: "The Material Witness"
1967-1968	Market in Honey Lane	Sarah Bush	7 episodes
1970	A Family at War	Mrs. McDermott	Episode: "Is Your Journey Really Necessary?"
1975	Churchill's People	Alice Campsie	Episode: "The Derry Boys"
