= Frank Leah =

- Born: 1886; Stockport
- Died: 1972 (aged 85–86)
- Occupation: Cartoonist, animator, painter

Frank Leah (1886-1972) was an illustrator, caricaturist and newspaper art editor based in Dublin, Ireland.

== Career ==
Caricature of Fred O'Donovan (actor) by Frank Leah (1917)

He worked for multiple Dublin newspapers and periodicals including the Weekly Freeman, Evening Telegraph, and the short-lived cinema and theatre publication The Irish Limelight. In 1917 he was the animator of the early Irish animated film, Ten Days' Leave.

He made portraits of many well-known Dublin personalities and famous Irish people including Michael Collins, Arthur Griffith and Éamon De Valera.

== Early life ==
Leah was born in 1886 in Stockport, England into a working class family, and was the eldest of many siblings. He sold his first cartoon at the age of 12 and left home at 15.
