= Zhang Yingtai =

Taiwanese writer and professor

Chang Ying-Tai
- 張瀛太
- Born: 1965 (age 60–61)
- Education: National Taiwan University (PhD)
- Occupations: Novelist, Professor
- Employer(s): National Taiwan University of Science and Technology
- Notable work: "To All the Boys We Loved Before", "The Bear Whispers to Me", "My Tibetan Lover"
- Awards: Lennox Robinson Literary Award (2015)

Chang Ying-Tai (Chinese: 張瀛太; pinyin: Zhāng Yíngtài; born 1965) is a Taiwanese novelist and a professor in the Department of Humanities and Social Sciences at the National Taiwan University of Science and Technology (NTUST). She devoted effort to pursue her career as a writer and worked diligently on literature. During her early life, she had to overcome family upheavals and financial challenges resulting from unemployment after completing graduate school degrees. These experiences and life struggles have influenced her diverse writing styles and contributed to her current achievements.

As a writer, Chang's works have received numerous awards. Her writing style is versatile, encompassing genres from romance to thrillers, historical fiction to fantasy, and humor to irony. In addition, Chang addresses a variety of concerns in her writings, including topics related to the environment, adolescence, and issues related to identity recognition.

Chang, a Chinese professor, was inspired by engineering students and chose to pursue her career at the National Taiwan University of Science and Technology. She builds good relationships with students, which is exemplified in an anecdote involving a student who used Classical Chinese to write a leave of absence request. She has published works such as Hunting the Oroqen (Chinese: 鄂倫春之獵), a short story about a researcher of Oroqen culture, and the short story collection Tibetan Lover (Chinese: 西藏愛人). In 2015, she received the Lennox Robinson Literary Award in Ireland.

Chang's publications encompass a wide range of genres, including novels, plays, essays, and newspaper columns. Her autobiographical campus novel, "To All the Boys We Loved Before" (Chinese: 花笠道中), explores the friendship between two girls and the love triangle involving two girls and one boy, along with the stories of other characters. Chang also created a micro-movie adaptation of this novel, which she uploaded to her YouTube channel in 2012.

Chang has actively participated in numerous national and local literary competitions. One of her novels, The Bear Whispers to Me (Chinese: 熊兒悄聲對我說), received the first Taipei International Book Fair Award and the Irish Lennox Robinson Literary Award.

== Early life and education ==
=== Early life ===
Chang Ying-Tai was born in 1965. In her early years, she aspired to emulate the qualities of Guanyin Bodhisattva. However, during her adolescence, she shifted her ambition toward becoming an artist. Despite her aspirations, her father did not support her personal pursuit, as he believed it might not be a wise choice for her future career. Following the completion of her master's degree, she encountered unemployment and had to rely on scholarships to pursue her career as a writer.

=== Education ===
==== 1995-2001 ====
Chang earned her Ph.D. in Chinese literature from National Taiwan University. Her areas of study encompass aesthetics, prose, scripts, modern literature, modern poetry, and Western novels. For instance, her master's thesis titled "The Aesthetics of Painting and Significance of Kuo Hsi's 'The Lofty Message of Nature' and Han Cho's 'Complete and Pure Theories of Landscape Painting'" was published in 1993. She also published her doctoral thesis, "The Study of Chu Si-Ning's Novels," in 2001. Additionally, she made substantial contributions to the Journal of Liberal Arts and Social Sciences at the National Taiwan University of Science and Technology.

== Career: Author ==
=== Notable works and achievements ===
Chang is known for her notable works, which include novels such as To All the Boys We Loved Before, The Rose with A Thousand Faces, The Zither Player of Lost Kingdom, and The Bear Whispers to Me. She has also authored collections of short novels, including The Unstoppable Spring and My Tibetan Lover. In addition to her literary work, Chang has ventured into the realm of film scripts, contributing to projects like The Big Shot and Méng (also known as Our Commitment). Chang's work has received numerous prestigious awards, including the Lennox Robinson Literary Award in 2015, making her the first Taiwanese writer to win a literary prize in Ireland. Her literary prowess, imagination, and talent left a lasting impression on the judges and were seen as a reflection of the spirit of the late Lennox Robinson. Additionally, her writing consistently earns recognition, with frequent appearances on the shortlist of the Frankfurt Book Fair and acknowledgment as the Best Taiwanese Fiction.

=== Writing styles ===
According to the Lennox Robinson Literary Award committee, Chang's writing styles encompass a wide array of categories and topics. She has dabbled in historical fiction, fantasy, romance, and thrillers. Her choice of themes ranges from environmental conservation to historical skepticism, from the exploration of youthful emotions to encounters in foreign lands. Additionally, she frequently infuses her work with mythical elements.

One of her notable works, The Bear Whispers to Me, weaves a story involving bears, children, childhood, secrets, and myths. This narrative delves into the themes of humanity's impact on nature and its creatures.

Furthermore, romance is a recurring theme in Chang's works. In The Rose with A Thousand Faces, she blends historical events with daring imagination. The story revolves around a girl with the code name "Russian Rose", who is both a spy and the clandestine lover of Zhou Enlai and Chiang Kai-shek. The plot intricately weaves puzzles and intrigue around her character.

In To All the Boys We Loved Before, Chang explores the joys and sorrows of lost youth, including themes of friendship, first love, and the struggle to chart one's future. The novel showcases Chang's prowess in articulating these delicate emotions in her writing.

Chang is also recognized for her ability to craft romantic encounters and depict meaningful moments and moments of hesitation in life against the backdrop of foreign lands. In addition to My Tibetan Lover, The Unstoppable Spring narrates the story of a boy meeting a girl in a foreign country.

=== Identity recognition ===
Su Wei-Zhen, an associate professor in the Department of Chinese Literature at National Cheng Kung University, discusses issues of identity recognition in Chang's My Tibetan Lover. The story follows a female photographer who becomes disillusioned with her life in the city. She frequently travels to Tibet and assumes different Tibetan identities, shifting between her own Han nationality and that of the Tibetans. However, her perspective changes when she meets actor Ni-ma, who serves as a reflection for the photographer. Through her relationship with Ni-ma, the heroine ultimately achieves self-recognition.

== Career: Professor ==
Chang obtained her Ph.D. in Chinese Literature from National Taiwan University and currently serves as a distinguished professor in the Department of Humanities and Social Sciences at National Taiwan University of Science and Technology.

In an official interview published by NTUST, Chang explained her decision to join Taiwan Tech. She was drawn to Taiwan Tech's emphasis on pragmatism and practical work, which she considers vital for creative endeavors. Chang previously taught in the Chinese department of another national university, where she was impressed by the performance of science and engineering students. In her fiction class, she found the students from the electrical engineering department to be proficient and enthusiastic.

== Publications ==
Chang writes a wide variety of publications, including novels, short novels, plays, essays, columns and journals. As a novelist, her first-published novel is Floating Nest (巢渡). To All the Boys We Loved Before (花笠道中) is her autobiographical campus novel published in 2012. Further, her novels, Floating Nestle and The Bear Whispers to Me (熊兒悄聲對我說), had been translated into other languages than Mandarin Chinese. In addition, being a play writer, she wrote Our Commitment (盟) in 1998 and The Big Shot (大人物) in 2006.

=== To All the Boys We Loved Before ===
==== Outline ====
Starting writing from 1995, Chang's To All the Boys We Loved Before is a campus novel that based on her own experience. The main storyline concerned the friendship between two girls and the love triangle between two girls and one boy. Together with the plots of other characters, this novel depicted the love and hatred and the development of seven senior high school students into adulthood. After a few years, everything changed; destiny brought all of them together again.

==== Love triangle ====
The two best friends, Sun Wei-Ching and Du Hua-Li, had been classmates since they were six. It was said that Du was like Sun's bodyguard, and Sun was like Du's babysitter. However, their inseparability began to be eliminated at the age of seventeen because they fell in love with the same boy, Liang Bi-Chuan. Their friendship collapsed, and they fought with each other over Liang.

==== Development into adulthood ====
Born in different family backgrounds, all of the seven characters had their own characteristics and uniqueness. They were in a dilemma and paradoxes of "society", "family", and "self-identity" during the period of growing up to adulthood. With compromise, fear, impulse, contemptuousness, anxiety, etc., fate finally brought them to their own life and future. The truth dawned on them, and they became mature enough to embrace reality and their destiny.

==== Main characters ====
1. Sun Wei-Ching (宋徽青): The narrator of To All the Boys We Loved Before. Being characterized as attentive and gentle, she had pronouns such as "white" and "swallow" in the novel. Her father left without a word. Thus, she and her mother were under others' roofs and couldn't be independent when she studied at her senior high.
2. Du Hua-Li (杜花笠): Sun's best friend. She always stood out from the crowd and was an overly chivalrous girl. In contrast with Sun, she represented "black" and "crow". Withdrawn from many schools and transferred to many schools, she once said, "being isolated logically and rationally, this is what the noblest crane does ".
3. Liang Bi-Chuan (梁碧川): The classmate and crush of Sun and Du. His mother died, and his older sister left his family behind. He relied on the profits of his father's stall to survive.
4. Yuan Cheng-Chiu (袁澄秋)
5. Chu Sheng-Hua (朱湛華)
6. Hsiao Tsung-Hao (蕭從浩)
7. Chiang Yu-Chu (姜有橘)

== Awards and honors ==
=== Beginnings and early triumphs (1993-1996) ===
Chang embarked on her literary journey during her college years, actively participating in various literary competitions sponsored by newspapers and national awards. In 1993, she achieved her first notable milestone by receiving an award in the college novel category at the 11th National Student Literary Awards.(全國學生文學獎).

=== Emergence and Recognition (1996-2013) ===
Between 1993 and 2013, Chang's literary prowess flourished.Her short story "Floating Nest" received the second Fucheng Literary Award (府城文學獎) in 1996 and was subsequently published as a book in 2004 Her novel "My Tibetan Love" won the 21st United Daily Literary Award in 1999. Chang's award-winning short story, "A Libellula Flew" (飛來一朵蜻蜓花), was chosen as the Annual Novel Award (年度小說獎) by Jiuge Publishing House (九歌出版社) in 2000.

=== Versatility and continued success (2013-Present) ===
In 2013, Chang's semi-autobiographical novel "To All the Boys We Loved Before" was chosen as the Film and Television Focus Recommendation (影視焦點推薦書) by the Ministry of Culture and the Taipei International Book Fair (台北國際書展). In 2015, "The Bear Whispers to Me" was translated into English and received the Lennox Robinson Literary Award in Ireland.
