= The Shewing-Up of Blanco Posnet =

1909 play by George Bernard Shaw

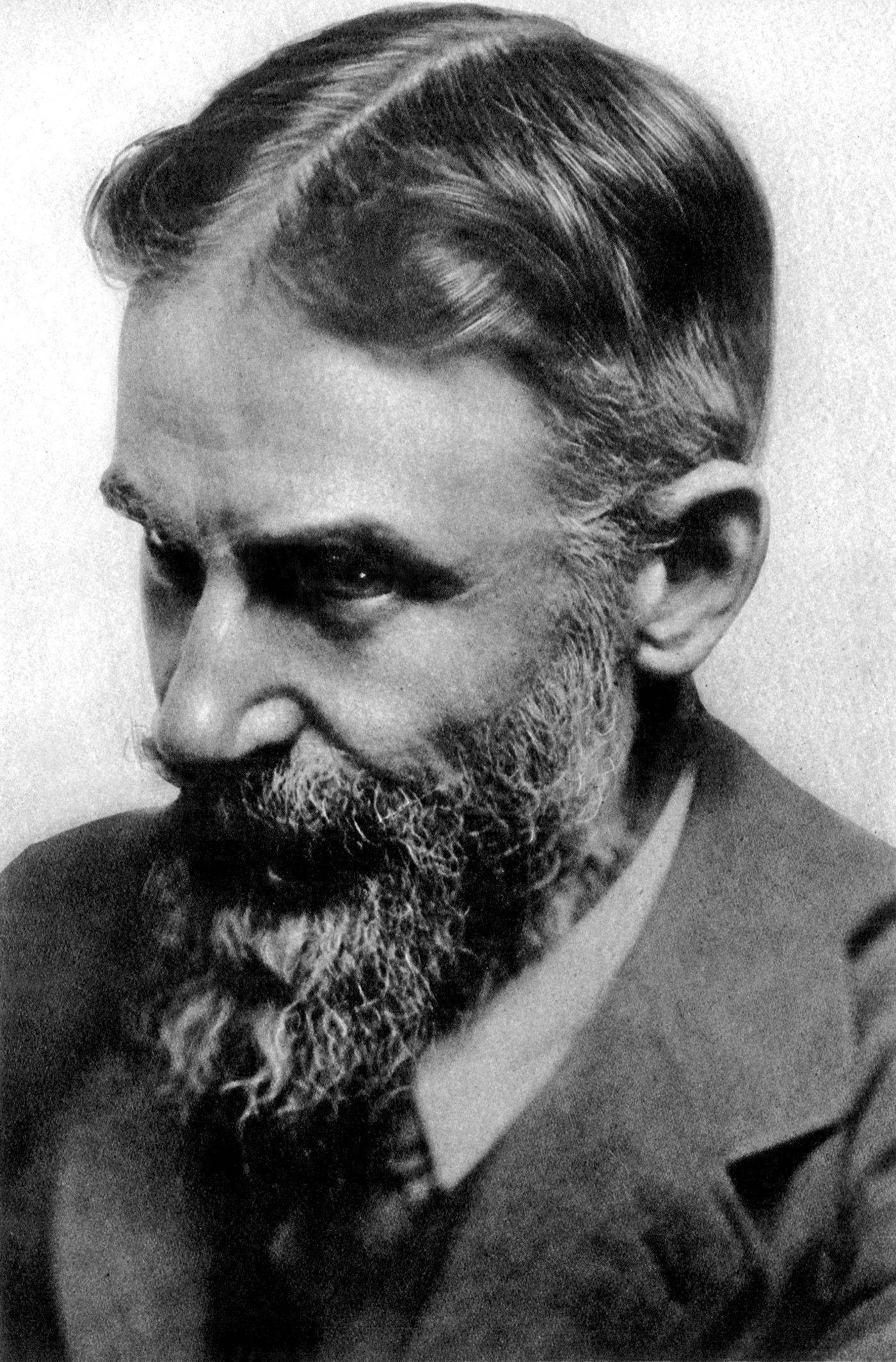
- Original language: English
- Written by: George Bernard Shaw
- Subject: A man is saved from hanging by a prostitute
- Genre: "Crude Melodrama"
- Setting: A pioneer town in the American West

Premiere
- Date: 10 April 1909
- Place: Liverpool by Abbey Theatre (of Dublin)

The Shewing-Up of Blanco Posnet: A Sermon in Crude Melodrama is a one-act play by George Bernard Shaw, first produced in 1909. Shaw describes the play as a religious tract in dramatic form.

In 1909 Shaw jousted with governmental censorship, as personified by The Examiner Of Plays, an agency acting under the auspices of the Lord Chamberlain. The outcome, unsatisfactory to Shaw, is reviewed minutely in the Preface to this play, which had been refused a license to perform because of statements made by the protagonist about God, which were thought to violate the blasphemy law in force at the time.

== Characters ==
- Babsy
- Lottie
- Hannah
- Jessie
- Emma
- Elder Daniels
- Blanco Posnet
- Strapper Kemp
- Euphemia "Feemy" Evans
- Sheriff Kemp
- Foreman of jury
- Nestor
- Waggoner Joe
- The Woman

== Plot summary ==
The play is set in the American West. Blanco Posnet, a local drunk and reprobate, is brought before the court accused of stealing a horse belonging to the Sheriff. He had been found walking along a road out of town after having left his brother's house in the early hours of the morning. The same night the horse had gone missing from his brother's stable. His accusers assume he has sold or concealed the horse. Blanco says they can't convict him without evidence that he ever had the horse. He also says he was owed some jewellery belonging to his mother, which had been bequeathed to him, but his brother had refused to hand it over. Even if he did take the horse he did so as payment for the debt his brother owed. Unfortunately he was unaware that the horse was merely being stabled by his brother, but belonged to the Sheriff. His brother, a reformed drunkard who is now a church Deacon, lectures Blanco on morality and judgement, but Blanco ridicules his brother's view of God.

Feemy, the local prostitute, is called to witness. She says that she saw Blanco riding off on the horse. Blanco says that her word cannot be trusted, as she is a woman of low character and she admits she was drunk at the time; in any case she has a grudge against him because - unlike members of the jury he can name - he had no interest in her services. The jury are outraged and strongly inclined to convict Blanco. At this point news arrives that the horse has been found. A woman had used it to take her sick child to the nearest doctor. The woman is brought to the court. She says she was given the horse by a man who was about to pass her on it on the road as she was carrying her dying child. She had pleaded with the man to allow her to take the horse. The judge asks her to name the man, but she absolutely denies that Blanco was the man who gave her the horse. She says that the man who did give it to her evidently did so in the knowledge that on foot he would probably be caught and could be hanged. It is clear to everyone that Blanco gave her the horse, but she cannot bring herself to name him if it will mean his conviction and inevitable hanging. Feemy takes the stand again and says she was lying about having seen Blanco. She never saw him on the horse. Blanco is released. He offers to marry Feemy in thanks for what she did, but she rejects him. Blanco says he'll buy drinks for everyone in the saloon and offers to shake Feemy's hand. She accepts.

== Production and censorship ==
The play was originally to have been performed in one of Herbert Beerbohm Tree's After Noon Theatre productions at His Majesty's Theatre. However, the censor demanded changes to the text because the statements made by Blanco Posnet about God were thought to contravene the Blasphemy law. Shaw refused to alter the text, insisting that the views expressed were absolutely central to the meaning of the play.

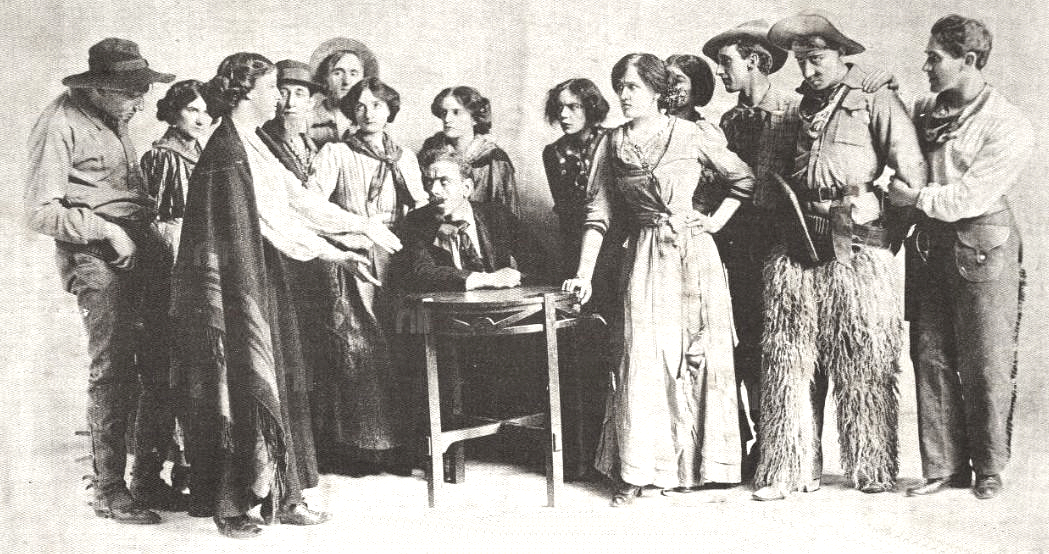
The Abbey Theatre cast of Blanco Posnet, c. 1912. Fred O’Donovan in the title role is second from right. The other names are on the website of the University of Victoria.

The Theatres Act 1843 only applied to the vicinities of London, Oxbridge, and royal residences, and not at all in Ireland. Shaw suggested that the play could be performed at the Abbey Theatre in Dublin. The play was accepted. Despite pressure from the Dublin Castle administration to stop the production, it went ahead. Shaw refused to make any of the changes requested by the censor, but did make two changes in the play at the suggestion of Lady Gregory, as he believed they were improvements, but they had nothing to do with the issues raised by the censorship. The Abbey players' first public performance was in Liverpool on 10 April 1909. Its Dublin premiere on 25 August 1909 played to "a packed house", including James Joyce, who was reviewing it for the Trieste newspaper Piccolo della sera (and was "mightily unimpressed" by it). W. B. Yeats had been keen to put on the play to emphasise that culture in Ireland could be more liberal-minded than England. Before the first performance he gave a speech saying,

The root of the whole difference between us and England in such matters [as censorship] is that though there might be some truth in the old charge that we are not truthful to one another here in Ireland, we are certainly always truthful to ourselves. In England they have learned from commerce to be truthful to one another, but they are great liars when alone. The English censor exists to keep them from finding out the fact. He gives them incomplete arguments, sentimental half-truths, and above all he keeps dramatists from giving them anything in sudden phrases that would startle them into the perception of reality.

The Abbey production transferred to London for two private performances (which were legal) at the Aldwych Theatre on 5 and 6 December 1909 under the auspices of the Incorporated Stage Society.

The play was later performed to the general public at the recently founded, amateur, People's Theatre, Newcastle upon Tyne (than called the Clarion Dramatic Society), in September 1911, and again in April 1912, when it formed part of a double-bill with Shaw's How He Lied to Her Husband. This play marked the beginning of a long association between Shaw and the People's Theatre, where several more productions of it took place between March 1913 and June 1930, with a final revival in January 1951.

== Meaning ==
Shaw claimed that "this little play is really a religious tract in dramatic form", the plot being less important than the debate about morality and divinity that occurs between the characters. He was using the folksy language and quirky insights of his principal character to explore his version of the Nietzschean concept that modern morality must move "beyond good and evil". Shaw took the view that God is a process of continual self-overcoming: "if I could conceive a god as deliberately creating something less than himself, I should class him as a cad. If he were simply satisfied with himself, I should class him as a lazy coxcomb. My god must continually strive to surpass himself." When he heard that Leo Tolstoy had shown an interest in the ideas expressed in the play, he wrote a letter to him explaining his views further:

You will see that my theology and my explanation of the existence of evil is expressed roughly by Blanco. To me God does not yet exist; but there is a creative force constantly struggling to evolve an executive organ of godlike knowledge and power: that is, to achieve omnipotence and omniscience; and every man and woman born is a fresh attempt to achieve this object...To my mind, unless we conceive God as engaged in a continual struggle to surpass himself--as striving at every birth to make a better man than before--we are conceiving nothing better than an omnipotent snob.

Shaw's friend and biographer Archibald Henderson summarises the meaning of the play as follows:

In spite of its apparently flippant title and mining camp language it is the most sincerely religious of plays. It is, in small compass, a narration of the workings of that religion which Shaw first projected in The Dream in Hell [Don Juan in Hell]. The problem of evil is the result of the imperfection of the striving and incomplete God. Like Dick Dudgeon [in The Devil's Disciple], Blanco becomes an instrument in the hands of some higher force: against his reason he finds himself impelled to save a child. "There's no good and bad," says Posnet in his puncheon-bench sermon; "but by Jiminy, gents, there's a rotten game, and there's a great game. I played the rotten game; but the great game was played on me; and now I'm for the great game every time. Amen."

Henderson, who was American, found Shaw's attempts to depict the West unconvincing to the point of absurdity, "To an American, familiar with the scenes and conditions described, the superficial pseudo-realism of the play is grotesque in its unreality", but the central idea was effective — the attempt to represent an original idea of God forming in the mind of a "crude" person at the edge of civilisation: "It is a study of the sudden impact of the idea of a primitive God upon the mind of a crude cowboy". James Joyce in his review for Il Piccolo della sera said he agreed with Shaw's own subtitle, the play was "a sermon in crude melodrama...the art is too poor to make it convincing as drama". He thought Shaw was showing himself up as bombastic sermoniser. Shaw had a gloriously "profane and unruly past. Fabianism, vegetarianism, prohibitionism, music, painting, drama--all the progressive movements in art and politics--have had him as champion. And now, perhaps some divine finger has touched his brain, and he, in the guise of Blanco Posnet, is shewn up".
