= Saints and Sinners (1949 film) =

1949 British film by Leslie Arliss

- Directed by: Leslie Arliss
- Written by: Paul Vincent Carroll; Leslie Arliss; Mabbie Poole
- Based on: play by Paul Vincent Carroll
- Produced by: Leslie Arliss; Tom D. Connochie
- Starring: Kieron Moore; Christine Norden; Sheila Manahan
- Cinematography: Osmond Borrodaile
- Edited by: David Newhouse
- Music by: Philip Green
- Production company: London Film Productions
- Distributed by: British Lion Films(U.K.); Lopert (U.S.A.)
- Release date: 15 August 1949
- Running time: 87 minutes
- Country: United Kingdom
- Language: English
- Box office: £98,061 (UK)

Saints and Sinners is a 1949 British comedy drama film directed by Leslie Arliss and starring Kieron Moore, Christine Norden and Sheila Manahan. It was written by Paul Vincent Carroll, Arliss and Mabbie Poole.

== Premise ==
The film follows life in small Irish town, where a man is wrongly accused of theft.

== Cast ==
- Kieron Moore as Michael Kissane
- Christine Norden as Blanche
- Sheila Manahan as Sheila Flaherty
- Michael J. Dolan as Canon
- Maire O'Neill as Ma Murnaghan
- Tom Dillon as O'Brien
- Noel Purcell as Flaherty
- Pamela Arliss as Betty
- Edward Byrne as Barney Downey
- Sheila Ward as clothing woman
- Eric Gorman as Madigan
- Eddie Byrne as Norreys
- Liam Redmond as O'Driscoll
- Tony Quinn as Berry
- Cecilia McKevitt as Maeve
- Sheila Richards as Eileen O' Hara
- Anita Bolster as Julia Ann Kermody

== Production ==
It was filmed on location in and around Carlingford, Co. Louth, Ireland. There was some difficulty with Ireland's Actors' Equity over the hire of actors.

== Reception ==
The Monthly Film Bulletin wrote: "The film contains some admirable photography of beautiful scenery, and is directed with an eye for building up character studies that are certainly effective, thanks to two outstanding performances by Maire O'Neill and Michael Dolan as Ma Murnaghan and the Canon. The romantic side of the picture is less successful, though Kieron Moore as Michael and Christine Norden and Shiela Manahan as Blanche and Shelah do what they can with unsatisfactory material. But the film as a whole remains a curious mixture of Irish whimsy and suburban trimmings."

Kine Weekly wrote: "The picture takes itself much less seriously than Odd Man Out, but even so a stronger acid could have been used in the etching of its widely assorted Irish types. At times the plot tends to ramble, but, despite its shortcomings, it has moments, which include flood and fire spectacle, and a moral, As for its technical presentation, the authentic backgrounds are artistically composed and the camera work is more than adequate."

Picturegoer wrote: "There is a deal of charm about yin this story of a small Irish silage, and certainly quite a lot of originality. Its greatest asset is, however, the character drawing."

Picture Show wrote: "Attractively staged, with authentic and charming Irish backgrounds, this romantic comedy-drama relates how a pipe-smoking village prophetess foretells the end of the world, with astonishing reactions on the villagers. Maire O'Neill as Ma, the Prophetess, and Michael Dolan as the priest make their scenes glow with rich humour."

Variety wrote: "An Irish village steeped in tradition and superstition provides an interesting setting for this story of simple folk who find it difficult to resist temptation and keep to the straight and narrow pei. Production and script match the simplicity of the theme. Appeal is limited for the U.S. market. Production relies entirely on local characterizations. The touch of glamor which comes from the arrival of an American woman on the scene is out of keeping with the story. Kieron Moore has a typical h-man part, which he performs with vigor, but Christine Norden has little more to do than look attractive. Sheila Manahan gives a pleasing, sympathetic study as Michael's girl-friend, and Michael Dolan stands out as the understanding canon."
