= Michael J. Dolan =

Irish actor (1884–1954)

- Born: 1884
- Died: 21 October 1954 (aged 70); Dublin, County Dublin, Ireland
- Occupations: Film and stage actor
- Years active: 1900s–1950s

Michael J. Dolan (1884 – 21 October 1954) was an Irish actor known for Scrooge (1951), Captain Horatio Hornblower (1951) and Saints and Sinners (1949).

Dolan was a distinguished actor with the Abbey Theatre for many years where he appeared in many productions, and in December 1923 he took over management from Lennox Robinson. During that time he was stage manager, general manager and director. His career with the Abbey can be seen in the Abbey Theatre Archives.

During his acting career he appeared in numerous plays by Irish playwright Teresa Deevy, all of them Abbey Theatre productions: The King of Spain's Daughter (1936), Katie Roche which toured to the Arts Theatre Cambridge, England and Temporal Powers (1937), The King of Spain's Daughter (1939), Katie Roche (1949), and Katie Roche(1953) which was played at the Queen's Theatre, Dublin pending the rebuilding and enlargement of the Abbey Theatre.

Dolan died in Dublin on 21 October 1954, at the age of 70.

== Playography ==
- The King of Spain's Daughter - 1936
- Katie Roche - 1937
- Temporal Powers - 1937
- The King of Spain's Daughter - 1939
- Katie Roche - 1949
- Katie Roche - 1953

== Filmography ==
Year	Title	Role	Notes
1948	Another Shore	Twiss	Film debut
1949	Saints and Sinners	Canon	
1951	Talk of a Million	Tubridy	
1951	Captain Horatio Hornblower	Surgeon Gundarson	
1951	Scrooge	Spirit of Christmas Past	Final film role
