= Drama at Inish =

Comic play by Lennox Robinson

Drama at Inish is a comic play by the Irish writer Lennox Robinson which was first performed at the Abbey Theatre, Dublin on 6 February 1933. The storyline of the play serves as a parody of the plots and atmosphere of the plays being performed within it.

== Plot ==
The play is set in Inish, a small Irish seaside resort town, in the early 1930s. The dull routine of the town is plunged into chaos by the arrival of a repertory company led by the De la Meres, a husband and wife team of actor-managers, who have been contracted to take over the local theatre for a season. They plan to put on plays by Chekhov, Ibsen and Strindberg to improve the minds of the townspeople.

Surprisingly, the plays prove to be a success, and the theatre is constantly sold out. This appears to validate the De La Meres in their view that given the opportunity to see great art ordinary people will respond. This burst of success comes after many years of struggle for the company who have been travelling from one small town to another, and revives their hopes of one day performing in Dublin or London. Their affected manners and programme of intellectual plays, however, gradually irritate their hosts in the hotel where they are staying. Around the town, meanwhile, acts of criminality and passion break out in the previously sleepy area all of which are in some way connected with the theatre. The spate of strange behaviour even draws the attention of journalists from Dublin who are after the secret of the disturbances without realising the theatre is the cause of them.

The series of strange occurrences climaxes in the local TD voting against the government, and triggering its collapse, after being inspired by An Enemy of the People. This proves the last straw and the actors are asked to leave by the hotel owners. The play ends with a circus being engaged to replace the actors for the remainder of the season.

== Later productions ==
The play was produced by the Edinburgh Gateway Company in 1957.

== Is Life Worth Living? ==
This play was staged under the alternative title of Is Life Worth Living? at the Mint Theater, New York City, August 19 through October 18, 2009.
