= Kenneth Sarr =

Irish author and judge (1895–1967)

Kenneth Sheils Reddin (born John Kenneth Sheils Reddin; 1895 – 17 August 1967) known by the pen name Kenneth Sarr, was an Irish author and judge.

== Biography ==
Reddin was born in Dublin to John [J. J.] and Annie Reddin. He attended Belvedere College, Clongowes Wood College, and from 1910 Scoil Éanna, where Thomas McDonagh and Patrick Pearse were formative influences. His first pseudonym was Kenneth Esser (from "Kenneth S. R.") later shortened to Kenneth Sarr. He joined the Irish Volunteers and was interned after the Easter Rising. Literary figures often met at J.J. Reddin's house and Kenneth was associated with the Irish Theatre Company in Hardwicke Street, where his brothers Kerry and Norman acted. He attended University College Dublin and qualified as a solicitor. He was a member of the United Arts Club and sometime President of the Irish PEN Club. He visited James Joyce in Paris several times, first with a gift of Olhausen's black pudding, later at a PEN congress. Joyce, during his father's final illness, telegraphed Reddin's brother Dr Kerry Reddin about his treatment.

Reddin supported the Anglo-Irish Treaty and his father's house in Artane was burned in the Irish Civil War. In 1922 he was appointed a District Court judge based in Mullingar, later moving to the Newbridge and then Dublin districts. In court he wore what Terry De Valera called "his self-designed headdress like a black biretta". As well as writing plays and novels, he collected humorous anecdotes from his judicial work intended for a book to be called Laughter in My Court. In 1941 he objected to an article in PEN's magazine which he said was "propaganda, attacking the neutrality of Eire, and that all we wanted was to be left alone". In 1948, Erina Brady appointed him President of her short-lived Dublin Dance Theatre Club.

He retired from the bench on 19 March 1965.

His papers are held by the Kenneth Spencer Research Library at the University of Kansas.

Works written by Kenneth Sarr / Kenneth Reddin
Work	Year	Type	Notes
The Changeling	1920	Play	A two-act allegory produced by the Irish Theatre Company. The premiere was postponed a week from Bloody Sunday and the audience was "meagre" due to the curfew then in force.
"In a Sinn Fein Court"	1922	Article	In The Belvederian
The Passing	1924	Play	Subtitled "A tragedy in one act". Produced by the Abbey Theatre on 9 December 1924. Won the drama prize at the 1924 Tailteann Games. Its subject matter, a prostitute with an idiot son, was condemned by some viewers.
Old Mag	1924	Play	Subtitled "A Christmas play in one act". Produced by the Abbey Theatre on 22 December 1924.
The white bolle-trie	1927	Novel	Subtitled "A wonder story". A children's story.
Somewhere To The Sea	1936	Novel	A roman a clef set around the truce ending the Irish War of Independence.
Another Shore	1945	Novel	adapted in 1948 into an Ealing comedy of the same name. Published in the United States as Young man with a dream.
"A Man called Pearse"	1945	Article	In Studies.
