= Lennox Robinson =

Irish dramatist and poet (1886–1958)

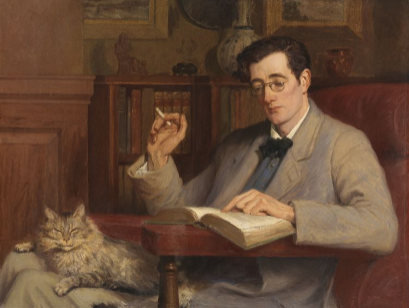
- Born: 4 October 1886; Douglas, County Cork, Ireland
- Died: 15 October 1958 (aged 72); Ireland
- Occupations: Dramatist; poet; theatre producer; theatre director
- Spouse: Dorothy Travers Smith (m. 1931)

Esmé Stuart Lennox Robinson (4 October 1886 – 15 October 1958) was an Irish dramatist, poet and theatre producer and director who was involved with the Abbey Theatre.

== Life ==
Robinson was born in Westgrove, Douglas, County Cork and raised in a Protestant and Unionist family in which he was the youngest of seven children. His father, Andrew Robinson, was a middle-class stockbroker who in 1892 decided to become a clergyman in the Church of Ireland in the small Ballymoney parish, near Ballineen in West Cork. A sickly child, Robinson was educated by private tutor and at Bandon Grammar School. In August 1907, his interest in the theatre began after he went to see an Abbey production of plays by W. B. Yeats and Lady Gregory at the Cork Opera House. He published his first poem that same year. His play, The Cross Roads, was performed in the Abbey in 1909 and he became manager of the theatre towards the end of that year. Shortly after joining the Abbey Theatre, he was sent to London for three months to train under George Bernard Shaw as his assistant while he was directing Misalliance. He resigned in 1914 as a result of a disastrous tour of the United States but returned in 1919. He was appointed to the board of the theatre in 1923 and continued to serve in that capacity until his death, his Abbey career and production involvement can be found in the Abbey archives

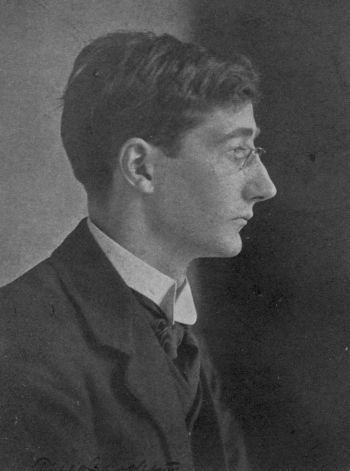
Lennox Robinson

As a playwright, Robinson showed himself as a nationalist with plays like Patriots (1912) and Dreamers (1915). On the other hand, he belonged to a part of Irish society which was not seen as fully Irish. This division between the majority native Irish (Roman Catholics) on one side and the Anglo-Irish (Protestants) on the other can be seen in a play such as The Big House (1926), which depicts the burning of a Protestant manor home by the IRA. Robinson's most popular plays were The Whiteheaded Boy (1916), The Big House and Drama at Inish (1933).

Other plays included Crabbed Youth and Age (1924), The Far Off Hills (1928), and Church Street (1935). Drama at Inish, which was presented in London and on Broadway as Is Life Worth Living?, was revived as part of the 2011 season at the Shaw Festival (Niagara-on-the-Lake, Ontario, Canada), with Mary Haney as Lizzie Twohig. Robinson's fiction includes Eight Short Stories (1919). In 1931 he published a biography of Bryan Cooper, who had recently died. In 1951, he published Ireland's Abbey Theatre, the first full-length history of the company.

He published an edited edition of Lady Gregory's diaries in 1947. In 1958 he co-edited (with Donagh MacDonagh) The Oxford Book of Irish Verse'.. He was also a director and producer, in 1930 he produced a play by Irish playwright Teresa Deevy called The Reapers and in 1931 he was co-director of A Disciple along with W. B. Yeats and Walter Starkie.

== Personal life ==
Robinson married artist Dorothy Travers Smith, the Abbey Theatre stage designer. Their correspondence is in the Library of Trinity College Dublin. Dorothy Travers-Smith's mother was spiritualist Hester Dowden, the daughter of Irish literary scholar Edward Dowden.

He is buried in St. Patrick's Cathedral. The Abbey Players wished to attend the service but, after having been told by the Archbishop that any Catholic setting foot in the Cathedral or graveyard would be committing a mortal sin, only one attended.

== Lennox Robinson Literary Award ==
Awarded annually at the Lennox Robinson Literary Festival, held in Douglas, Cork; first awarded in 2014.

- 2015 winner - Chang Ying-tai (張瀛太)
- 2014 winner - Eoghan Harris

== Dramatic works ==
- The Clancy Name (1908)
- The Cross Roads (1909)
- Harvest (1910)
- The Lesson of his Life (1911)
- Patriots (1912)
- The Dreamers (1915)
- The Whiteheaded Boy (1916)
- The Lost Leader (1918)
- The Round Table (1922)
- Crabbed Youth and Age (1922)
- Never the Time and the Place (1924)
- The White Blackbird (1925)
- The Big House (1926)
- The Far-Off Hills (1928)
- Ever the Twain (1929)
- The Reapers (1930)
- A Disciple (1931)
- Drama At Inish (1933)
- Church Street (1934)
- All's Over Then? (1935)
- When Lovely Woman (1936)
- Killycreggs in Twilight (1937)
- Bird's Nest (1938)
- Roly Poly (1940) - adapted from Guy de Maupassant's story Boule de Suif
- Forget-Me-Not (1941)
- The Lucky Finger (1948)

== See also ==
- List of Irish Nobel laureates and nominees

== Sources ==
- Igoe, Vivien. A Literary Guide to Dublin. ISBN 0-413-69120-9
- Selected Plays - Lennox Robinson. Chosen and Introduced by Christopher Murray (Colin Smythe, 1982). ISBN 0-86140-087-9
