= 1938 Nobel Prize in Literature =

- Pearl Sydenstricker Buck
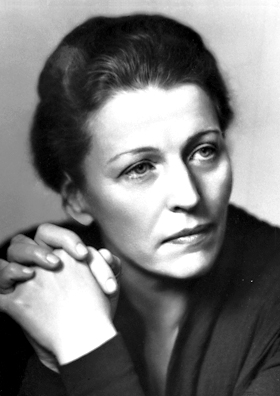
- "for her rich and truly epic descriptions of peasant life in China and for her biographical masterpieces."
- Date: 10 November 1938 (announcement); 10 December 1938 (ceremony)
- Location: Stockholm, Sweden
- Presented by: Swedish Academy
- First award: 1901
- Website: Official website

The 1938 Nobel Prize in Literature was awarded to the American author Pearl S. Buck (1892–1973) "for her rich and truly epic descriptions of peasant life in China and for her biographical masterpieces." Buck was the first female American to be awarded the Nobel Prize and the third American recipient following Eugene O'Neill in 1936 and Sinclair Lewis in 1930. She was also the fourth woman to receive the prize.

== Laureate ==
Pearl Buck's first novel, East Wind: West Wind, was published in 1930, which narrates about a Chinese woman, Kwei-lan, and the changes that she and her family undergo. It was followed then by trilogy that brought her major literary breakthrough: The Good Earth (1931), Sons (1932), and A House Divided (1935), which is a saga about the Wang family. The books were highly acclaimed and very popular during the 1930s receiving other literary prizes such as the 1932 Pulitzer Prize for Fiction. The recurring theme in Buck's many novels is everyday life in China wherein she describes a rich gallery of characters, trapped between tradition and modernity.

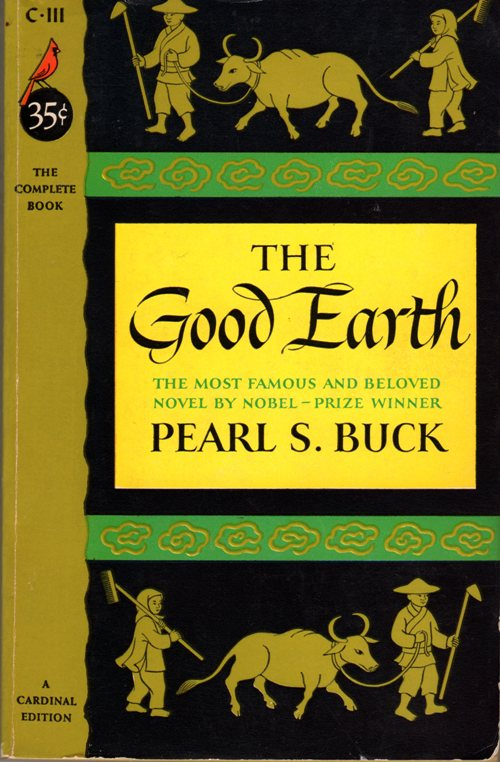
The Good Earth was the best-selling novel in the United States in both 1931 and 1932 and was influential in Buck's winning the Nobel Prize for Literature in 1938.

== Deliberations ==
=== Nominations ===
Pearl Buck had not been nominated before for the prize, making her one of the laureates who won on a rare occasion when they have been awarded the Nobel Prize in Literature the same year they were first nominated. She received 4 four nominations all from members of the Swedish Academy.

In total, the academy received 47 nominations for 29 writers among them the American novelist Margaret Mitchell, Finnish writer Frans Eemil Sillanpää (awarded in 1939), Danish writer Johannes V. Jensen (awarded in 1944), Hermann Hesse (awarded in 1946), Czech author Karel Čapek, Norwegian writer Johan Falkberget, British author Aldous Huxley, Greek poet Kostis Palamas, Croatian author Ivana Brlić-Mažuranić, Italian philosopher Benedetto Croce, and Finnish writer Sally Salminen.

The authors Lascelles Abercrombie, Samuel Alexander, Serafín Álvarez Quintero, Alexander Amfiteatrov, Ernst Barlach, Nagendranath Basu, Rudolf G. Binding, Sarat Chandra Chattopadhyay, Gabriele D'Annunzio, Isabelo de los Reyes, C. J. Dennis, Paola Drigo, Zona Gale, Edmund Husserl, Muhammad Iqbal, Aleksandr Ivanovich Kuprin, Leopoldo Lugones, Osip Mandelstam, Momčilo Nastasijević, Henry Newbolt, Millosh Gjergj Nikolla (known as Migjeni), Branislav Nušić, Olivia Shakespear, William Stern, Alfonsina Storni, César Vallejo, Owen Wister and Thomas Wolfe died in 1938 without having been nominated for the prize. Croatian writer Ivana Brlić-Mažuranić died weeks before the announcement.

Official list of nominees and their nominators for the prize
No.	Nominee	Country	Genre(s)	Nominator(s)
1	Mark Aldanov (1886–1957)	Soviet Union; France	biography, novel, essays, literary criticism	Ivan Bunin (1870–1953)
2	Ivana Brlić-Mažuranić (1874–1938)	Yugoslavia (Croatia)	novel, short story	Albert Bazala (1877–1947); Gavro Manojlović (1856–1939)
3	Pearl Buck (1892–1973)	United States	novel, biography, autobiography, essays	Henrik Schück (1855–1947); Sven Hedin (1865–1952); Torsten Fogelqvist (1880–1941); Bo Bergman (1869–1967)
4	Henriette Charasson (1884–1972)	France	poetry, essays, drama, novel, literary criticism, biography	Serge Barrault (1887–1976)
5	Sanjib Kumar Chaudhuri (1902–)	India	law, philology	Mahmud Hasan (1897–)
6	António Correia de Oliveira (1878–1960)	Portugal	poetry	Antero de Figueiredo (1866–1953)
7	Benedetto Croce (1866–1952)	Italy	history, philosophy, law	Johan Nordström (1891–1967)
8	Karel Čapek (1890–1938)	Czechoslovakia	drama, novel, short story, essays, literary criticism	Josef Janko (1869–1947) (Note: Karel Čapek was also nominated by 10 other professors of history and literature at Charles University, Prague.)
9	Maria Madalena de Martel Patrício (1884–1947)	Portugal	poetry, essays	António Baião (1878–1961)
10	Olav Duun (1876–1939)	Norway	novel, short story	Paal Berg (1873–1968); Halvdan Koht (1873–1965); Torstein Høverstad (1880–1959)
11	Johan Falkberget (1879–1967)	Norway	novel, short story, essays	Fredrik Paasche (1886–1943); Richard Beck (1897–1980)
12	Mohammad Habib Khan (?) (probably Mohammad Habib (1895–1971))	Afghanistan (or India)	history	Per Hallström (1866–1960) (Note: This nomination was a pro forma nomination.)
13	Jarl Hemmer (1893–1944)	Finland	poetry, novel	Hjalmar Hammarskjöld (1862–1953)
14	Hermann Hesse (1877–1962)	Germany; Switzerland	novel, poetry, essays, short story	Sigfrid Siwertz (1882–1970); Anders Österling (1884–1981)
15	Aldous Huxley (1894–1963)	United Kingdom	novel, short story, essays, poetry, screenplay, drama, philosophy	Wilhelm Keilhau (1888–1954)
16	Johannes Vilhelm Jensen (1873–1950)	Denmark	novel, short story, essays	7 Danish and Norwegian nominators (unnamed); Carl Adolf Bodelsen (1894–1978); Francis Bull (1887–1974)
17	Rudolf Kassner (1873–1959)	Austria	philosophy, essays, translation	Carl Jacob Burckhardt (1891–1974)
18	Veikko Antero Koskenniemi (1885–1962)	Finland	poetry, essays	Aapeli Saarisalo (1896–1986)
19	Ramón Menéndez Pidal (1869–1968)	Spain	philology, history	Gunnar Tilander (1894–1973)
20	Margaret Mitchell (1900–1949)	United States	novel	Sven Hedin (1865–1952)
21	Kostis Palamas (1859–1943)	Greece	poetry, essays	3 members of the Athens Academy of Science
22	Robert Ritchie Racey (1873–1956)	Canada	novel, essays	Arthur Leonard Phelps (1887–1970)
23	Valdemar Rørdam (1872–1946)	Denmark	poetry, essays	Ejnar Thomsen (1897–1956); Henrik Pontoppidan (1857–1943)
24	Sally Salminen (1906–1976)	Finland	novel, essays, autobiography	Henrik Schück (1855–1947)
25	Karl Schönherr (1867–1943)	Austria	drama, short story, poetry	Kaarle Sanfrid Laurila (1876–1947)
26	Frans Eemil Sillanpää (1888–1964)	Finland	novel, short story, poetry	Jalo Kalima (1884–1952); Yrjö Hirn (1870–1952); Aarno Maliniemi (1892–1972); Lauri Cederberg (1881–1943); Kurt Reinhold Melander (1858–1941); Juho Kusti Paasikivi (1870–1956)
27	Herman Teirlinck (1879–1967)	Belgium	novel, poetry, essays, drama	Hjalmar Hammarskjöld (1862–1953)
28	Arthur van Schendel (1874–1946)	Netherlands	novel, short story	Cornelis Gerrit Nicolaas de Vooys (1873–1955); 2 Dutch professors (unnamed) (Note: The two professors were from Leiden and Amsterdam, Netherlands.)
29	Stijn Streuvels (1871–1969)	Belgium	novel, short story	Fredrik Böök (1883–1961)

=== Prize decision ===
In their deliberations for the 1938 Nobel Prize in Literature, the Nobel committee failed to agree on one candidate. As the year before, three committee members, Hjalmar Hammarskjöld, Fredrik Böök and committee chairman Per Hallström, advocated a prize to the Flemish Belgian writer Stijn Streuvels. Committee member Torsten Fogelqvist divergently argued that Streuvels best works were too far back in time and proposed that Pearl Buck should be awarded, while Anders Österling proposed Hermann Hesse (subsequently awarded the 1946 Nobel Prize in Literature). Spanish philologist and historian Ramón Menéndez Pidal were also recommended as a candidate for the prize.

Pearl Buck was considered to be awarded for her biographical works and the novel The Good Earth. In the Nobel committee's report to the Swedish Academy dated 8 September 1938, chairman Per Hallström wrote: "The expert opinion expresses lively admiration for the author's biographies of her parents, the missionary couple, in China, and is inclined to grant these two books a truly classic rank and a corresponding prospect of lasting life, something that is rare enough in contemporary fiction. Alongside them, a couple of novels about Chinese peasant fates also stand out as decidedly remarkable through authenticity and richness of the depiction and rare knowledge and insight into a world little known to Western readers and very difficult to access. Already as a feat of discovery, they are significant, and they contain passages of high poetic value. As literary works of art, however, the two biographies are incomparable to anything else in Pearl Buck's oeuvre."

On 10 November 1938 the Swedish Academy decided that that year's Nobel Prize in Literature should be awarded to Pearl Buck "for her rich and truly epic descriptions of peasant life in China and for her biographical masterpieces".

== Reception ==
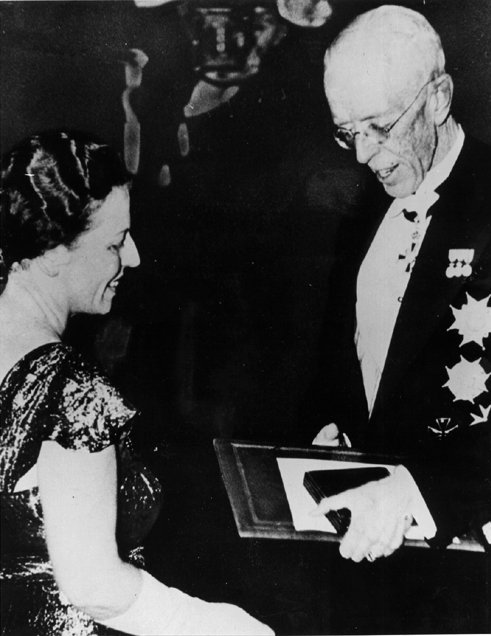
Pearl S. Buck receives the Nobel Prize for Literature from King Gustav V of Sweden in the Stockholm Concert Hall in 1938

In 1938, the Nobel Prize committee in awarding the prize said:

By awarding this year's Prize to Pearl Buck for the notable works which pave the way to a human sympathy passing over widely separated racial boundaries and for the studies of human ideals which are a great and living art of portraiture, the Swedish Academy feels that it acts in harmony and accord with the aim of Alfred Nobel's dreams for the future.

In her speech to the academy, she took as her topic "The Chinese Novel." She explained, "I am an American by birth and by ancestry", but "my earliest knowledge of story, of how to tell and write stories, came to me in China." After an extensive discussion of classic Chinese novels, especially Romance of the Three Kingdoms, All Men Are Brothers, and Dream of the Red Chamber, she concluded that in China "the novelist did not have the task of creating art but of speaking to the people." Her own ambition, she continued, had not been trained toward "the beauty of letters or the grace of art." In China, the task of the novelist differed from the Western artist: "To farmers he must talk of their land, and to old men he must speak of peace, and to old women he must tell of their children, and to young men and women he must speak of each other." And like the Chinese novelist, she concluded, "I have been taught to want to write for these people. If they are reading their magazines by the million, then I want my stories there rather than in magazines read only by a few."

== Reactions ==
The 1938 Nobel Prize is one of the most criticized in the prize's history because Buck's later works generally were not considered to be of the literary standard of a Nobel laureate. According to novelist Irving Wallace, he was told by Sven Hedin that Buck "scarcely bowled over the academy". Ten of the eighteen members voted against her, but Hedin and Selma Lagerlöf later changed their minds thus awarding her the prize.

The American literary critic Norman Holmes Pearson referred to the Swedish Academy's choice as reducing the Nobel to the "hammish" level of the Pulitzer Prize and commented: "Thank heavens I have seen no one who has taken it seriously." Referring to Buck's widely quoted comment when she received the Nobel news – "I don't believe it... That's ridiculous. It should have gone to Dreiser" – Pearson responded: "Nuts to her, say I, I think that was putting it mildly." Lists of American writers besides Theodore Dreiser whom contemporaries mentioned as more deserving of the Nobel than Pearl Buck included Henry James, Sherwood Anderson, Willa Cather, and John Dos Passos.
