= Claude Rains =

English and American actor (1889–1967)

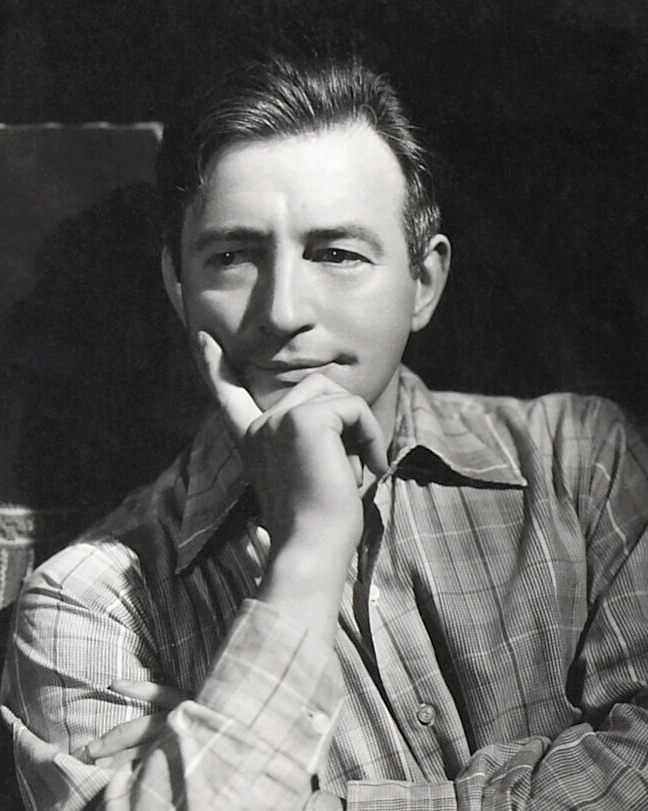
- Rains in 1938
- Born: William Claude Rains; 10 November 1889; London, England
- Died: 30 May 1967 (aged 77); Laconia, New Hampshire, US
- Citizenship: UK; US (after 1939)
- Education: Royal Academy of Dramatic Art
- Occupation: Actor
- Years active: 1900–1965
- Spouses: Isabel Jeans (m. 1913; div. 1915) Marie Hemingway (m. 1920; div. 1920) Beatrix Thomson (m. 1924; div. 1935) Frances Propper (m. 1935; div. 1956) Agi Jambor (m. 1959; div. 1960) Rosemary Clark Schrode (m. 1960; died 1964)
- Children: 1
- Father: Fred Rains
- Military career
- Allegiance: United Kingdom
- Branch: British Army
- Service years: 1914–1919
- Rank: Captain
- Units: London Scottish; Bedfordshire Regiment
- Conflicts: First World War

William Claude Rains (10 November 1889 – 30 May 1967) was an English and American character actor whose career spanned almost seven decades. He was the recipient of numerous accolades, including four Academy Award nominations for Best Supporting Actor, and he is considered one of the screen's great character stars who played cultured villains during the Golden Age of Hollywood.

The son of a stage actor, Rains began acting onstage in his native London in the 1900s. He became a leading thespian on the West End and an acting teacher at the Royal Academy of Dramatic Arts. He moved to the United States in the late 1920s and became a successful Broadway star, before making his American film debut as Dr. Jack Griffin in The Invisible Man (1933). He went on to play prominent roles in such big-screen productions as The Adventures of Robin Hood (1938), Mr. Smith Goes to Washington (1939), The Wolf Man (1941), Casablanca (1942), Kings Row (1942), Phantom of the Opera (1943), and Notorious (1946).

In 1951, he won the Tony Award for Best Actor in a Play for his performance in Darkness at Noon. He continued to work as a prominent character actor in films, notably as Mr. Dryden in Lawrence of Arabia (1962) and his final role in the Biblical epic The Greatest Story Ever Told (1965).

In 1960, he received a star on the Hollywood Walk of Fame for his contributions to the film industry. Richard Chamberlain described him as "one of the finest actors of the 20th century," while Bette Davis considered him one of her favorite co-stars.

== Early life ==
William Claude Rains was born on 10 November 1889 at 26 Tregothnan Road in Clapham, London. His parents were Emily Eliza (née Cox) and stage actor Frederick William Rains. He lived in the slums of London. Rains was one of 12 children, of whom all but four died while still infants. His mother took in boarders to support the family. Rains grew up with a Cockney accent and a speech impediment.

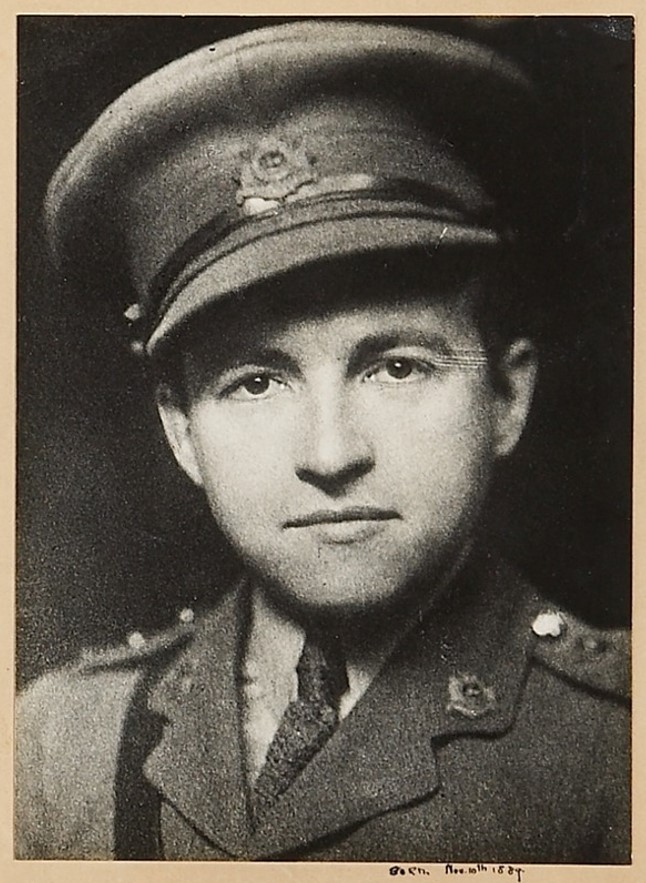
Rains in his captain's uniform during the First World War

Because his father was an actor, the young Rains spent time in theatres and was surrounded by actors and stagehands. There, he observed actors and the day-to-day running of a theatre. He made his stage debut at age 10 in the play Sweet Nell of Old Drury at the Haymarket Theatre, so that he could run around onstage as part of the production. He slowly worked his way up, becoming a call boy (telling actors when they were due onstage) at His Majesty's Theatre and later a prompter, stage manager, understudy, and then moving on from smaller parts with good reviews to larger, better parts.

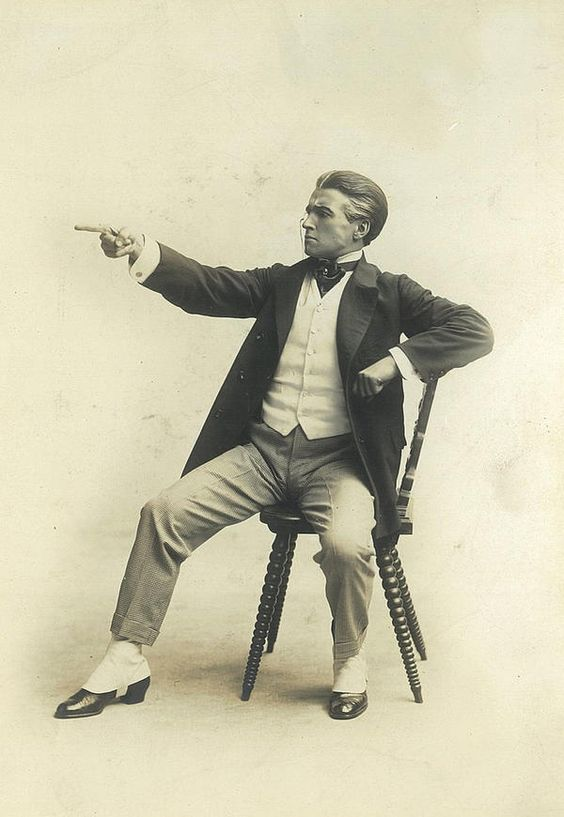
A 23-year-old Rains in one of his early theatre roles, 1912

== Early career and military service ==
Rains moved to the United States in 1912 for the opportunities that were being offered in the New York theatres. At the outbreak of World War I in 1914, though, he returned to England and was commissioned into the British Army's London Scottish regiment, alongside fellow actors Basil Rathbone, Ronald Colman, Herbert Marshall, and Cedric Hardwicke. In November 1916, Rains was involved in a gas attack at Vimy, which resulted in his permanently losing 90% of the vision in his right eye, as well as suffering vocal cord damage. He never returned to combat, but continued to serve with the Transport Workers Battalion of the Bedfordshire Regiment, in which he was commissioned as a temporary lieutenant on 9 May 1917. In March 1918, he was promoted to temporary captain, the rank he held at the end of the war. On 8 October 1918, he was appointed as adjutant, and continued to serve in that role until March 1919.

After his return to civilian life, Rains remained in England and continued to develop his acting talents, which were recognised by Sir Herbert Beerbohm Tree, the founder of the Royal Academy of Dramatic Art. Tree told Rains that to succeed as an actor, he would have to get rid of his Cockney accent and speech impediment. With this in mind, Tree paid for the elocution books and lessons that Rains needed to help him change his voice. Rains eventually shed his accent and speech impediment after practising every day. His daughter Jessica, when describing her father's voice, said, "The interesting thing to me was that he became a different person. He became a very elegant man, with a really extraordinary Mid-Atlantic accent. It was 'his' voice, nobody else spoke like that, half American, half English, and a little Cockney thrown in." Soon after changing his accent, he became recognised as one of the leading stage actors in London. At age 29, he made his film debut, playing the role of Clarkis in his only silent film, the British film Build Thy House (1920).

During his early years, Rains taught at the Royal Academy of Dramatic Arts. John Gielgud and Charles Laughton were among his students.

== Career ==
In London theatre, he achieved success in the title role of John Drinkwater's play Ulysses S. Grant, the follow-up to the same playwright's Abraham Lincoln. Rains portrayed Faulkland in Richard Brinsley Sheridan's The Rivals, presented at London's Lyric Theatre in 1925. He returned to New York City in 1927 and appeared in nearly 20 Broadway roles, in plays including George Bernard Shaw's The Apple Cart and dramatisations of The Constant Nymph and Pearl S. Buck's novel The Good Earth (as a Chinese farmer).

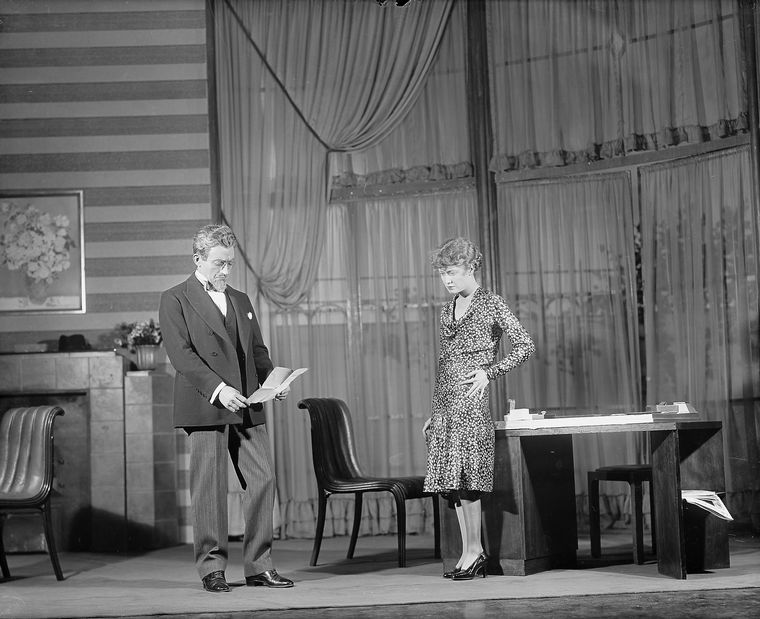
Rains with Mary Kennedy in Camel Through the Needle's Eye on Broadway, New York City, 1929

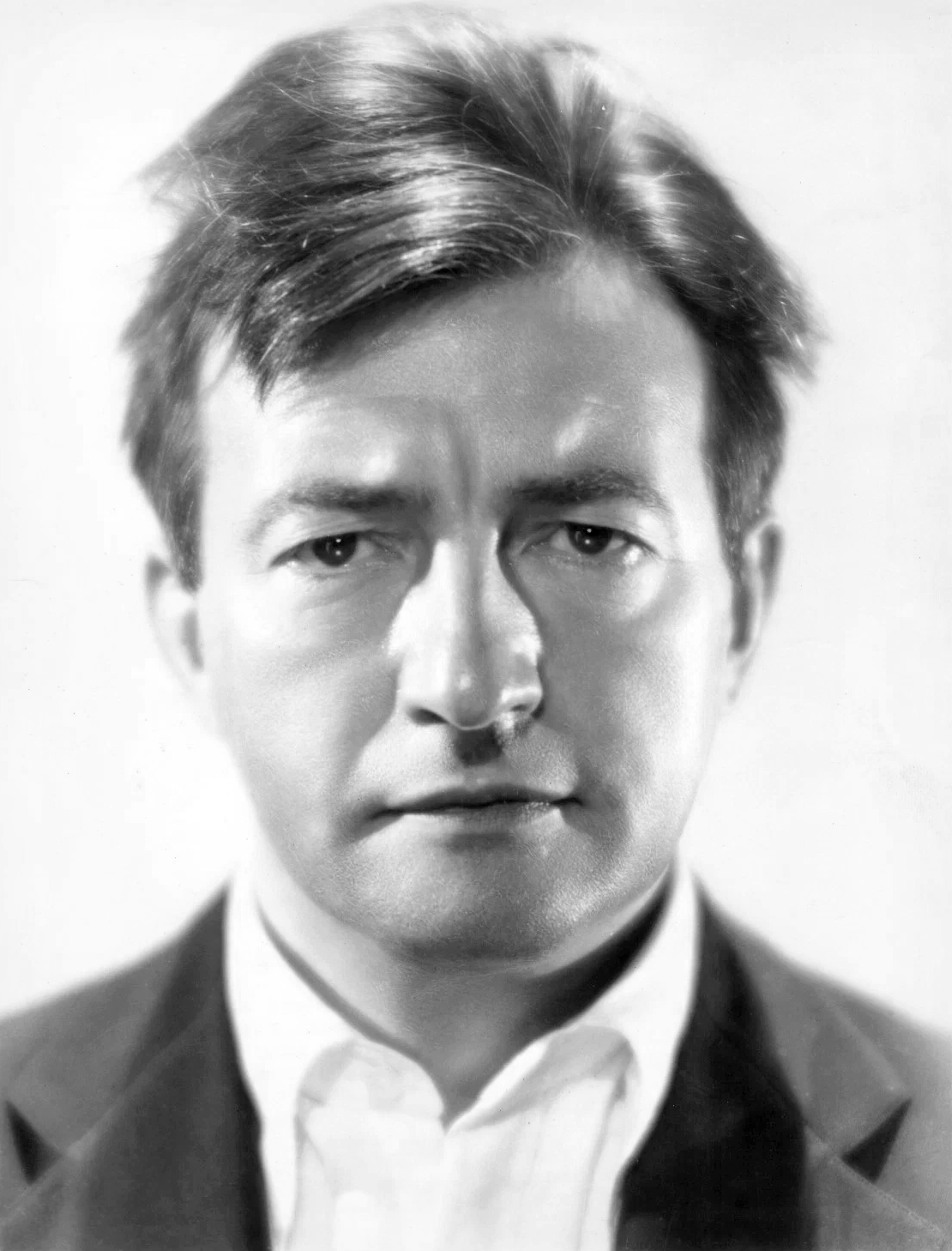
Publicity portrait for the 1934 film The Man Who Reclaimed His Head

Although he had played the single supporting role in the silent, Build Thy House (1920), Rains came relatively late to film acting. While working for the Theatre Guild, he was offered a screen test with Universal Pictures in 1932. His screen test for A Bill of Divorcement (1932) for a New York representative of RKO was a failure, but according to some accounts, led to his being cast in the title role of James Whale's The Invisible Man (1933) after his screen test and unique voice were inadvertently overheard from the next room. His agent, Harold Freedman, was a family friend of Carl Laemmle's, who controlled Universal Pictures at the time, and had been acquainted with Rains in London and was keen to cast him in the role. According to Rains' daughter, this was the only film of his he ever saw. He also did not go to see the rushes of the day's filming "because he told me, every time he went, he was horrified by his huge face on the huge screen, that he just never went back again."

Rains signed a long-term contract with Warner Bros. on 27 November 1935, with Warner able to exercise the right to lend him to other studios and Rains having a potential income of up to $750,000 over seven years. He played the villainous role of Prince John in The Adventures of Robin Hood (1938). Roddy McDowall once asked Rains if he had intentionally lampooned Bette Davis in his performance as Prince John, and Rains only smiled "an enigmatic smile." Rains later revealed to his daughter that he had enjoyed playing the prince as a homosexual, by using subtle mannerisms. Rains later credited the film's co-director Michael Curtiz with teaching him the more understated requirements of film acting, or "what not to do in front of a camera." On loan to Columbia Pictures, he portrayed a corrupt but honourable US senator in Mr. Smith Goes to Washington (1939), for which he received his first Academy Award nomination as Best Supporting Actor. For Warner Bros., he played Dr. Alexander Tower, who commits murder-suicide to spare his daughter a life of insanity in Kings Row (1942) and the cynical police chief Captain Louis Renault in Casablanca (also 1942). On loan again, Rains played the title character in Universal's remake of Phantom of the Opera (1943).

In her 1987 memoir, This 'N That, Bette Davis stated that Rains (with whom she shared the screen four times in Juarez, Now, Voyager, Mr. Skeffington, and Deception) was her favorite co-star. Rains became the first actor to receive a million-dollar salary when he portrayed Julius Caesar in a large-budget but unsuccessful version of Shaw's Caesar and Cleopatra (1945), filmed in Britain. Shaw apparently chose him for the part, although Rains intensely disliked Gabriel Pascal, the film's director and producer. Rains followed it with Alfred Hitchcock's Notorious (1946) as a refugee Nazi agent opposite Cary Grant and Ingrid Bergman. Back in Britain, he appeared in David Lean's The Passionate Friends (1949).

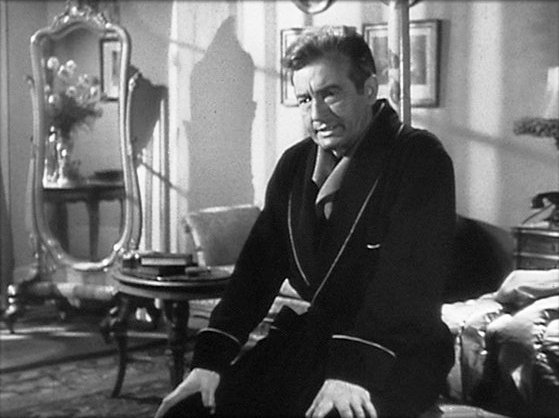
Rains in Notorious (1946)

His only singing and dancing role was in a 1957 television musical version of Robert Browning's The Pied Piper of Hamelin, with Van Johnson as the Piper. The NBC colour special, broadcast as a film rather than a live or videotaped programme, was highly successful with the public. Sold into syndication after its first telecast, it was repeated annually by many local US TV stations.

Rains remained active as a character actor in the 1950s and 1960s, appearing in films and as a guest in television series. He played the ventriloquist Fabian on Alfred Hitchcock Presents, season one, episode 20 "And So Died Riabouchinska", which aired on February 10, 1956, and again, in 1957, season two, episode 24 in "The Cream of the Jest" as a failing drunk actor. He ventured into science fiction for Irwin Allen's The Lost World (1960) and Antonio Margheriti's Battle of the Worlds (1961). Two of his late screen roles were as Dryden, a cynical British diplomat in Lawrence of Arabia (1962) and King Herod in The Greatest Story Ever Told (1965), his last film. In CBS's Rawhide, he portrayed Alexander Langford, an attorney in a ghost town, in the episode "Incident of Judgement Day" (1963).

He additionally made several audio recordings, narrating some Bible stories for children on Capitol Records, and reciting Richard Strauss's setting for narrator and piano of Tennyson's poem Enoch Arden, with the piano solos performed by Glenn Gould. He starred in The Jeffersonian Heritage, a 1952 series of 13 half-hour radio programmes recorded by the National Association of Educational Broadcasters and syndicated for commercial broadcast on a sustaining (i.e., commercial-free) basis.

== Reception ==
Jessica Rains remembered her father's work ethic:

He was interested in the process (of film). He loved acting. When he came to California to do a film, I had to "hear him his lines" as he drove me to school every morning, 10 miles [16 km]. He knew everybody's part. He knew the whole script before he came out (to film). I don't think many people did that.

Bette Davis in an interview with Dick Cavett said about Rains:

Well, of course he petrified me. The first time I played with him was in Carlotta (Juarez), and I had to make an entrance [into] the King of France's domain for a rehearsal, and he's playing the King of France (nota bene The character is actually the Emperor of the French Napoleon III) in rehearsal. As all of us "other era people," we don't just run through lines and say "turn the camera", we rehearse beforehand...Anyway Claude and I couldn't, and he was the King of France who loathed Carlotta, and I was a kid and petrified of Mr. Rains, so I thought he hated me. I didn't know he was playing the character. I thought, he thinks I just stink! What am I going to do? Eventually we worked together quite a lot and became really great friends, really great friends.

Davis later went on to describe him: "Claude was witty, amusing, and beautiful, really beautiful, thoroughly enchanting to be with and brilliant." She also praised his performances: "He was marvelous in Deception and was worth the whole thing as the picture wasn't terribly good, but he was so marvelous in the restaurant scene where he's talking about all the food...brilliant, and of course in Mr. Skeffington, he was absolutely brilliant as the husband, just brilliant."

Richard Chamberlain worked with Rains in his second-to-last film, Twilight of Honor. In 2009, Chamberlain recorded a tribute to the actor when Rains was featured as Turner Classic Movies' Star of the Month:

Claude Rains has to be considered one of the finest actors of the 20th century. As soon as you hear that marvelous, unmistakable voice of honey mixed with gravel, he becomes instantly recognizable. And that scornful right eyebrow which could freeze an adversary faster than and more effectively than any physical threat. He stood at a mere 5′6″, yet his enormous talent and immense stage presence made him a giant among his colleagues. During a stage and film career that spanned six decades, Rains encompassed some of the most memorable and exciting characters ever created by an actor. Villains were a Rains specialty, particularly those of a suave and sarcastic nature; and yet when the role called for it, Rains could be remarkably moving and even add a touch of pathos without losing any of his effectiveness.

In Twilight of Honor Rains played a retired lawyer acting as a mentor to Chamberlain's character. Reminiscing about his work with Rains, Chamberlain said:

He was in his seventies then and in failing health, yet he was charming and totally professional on the set. It was clear to us that he loved practicing his craft; he dazzled us all. Claude was an extremely private man—he never discussed his humble beginnings, his six marriages. But get him into a conversation about acting, and he opened up with delightful anecdotes and fascinating stories about his long life as a thespian.

One day on the set I mentioned to him that Notorious was one of my favorite films, and Claude related with amusement the filming of a particular scene with Ingrid Bergman. Rains was a very small man and Bergman was quite tall, so in order to shoot them in close-up together (in the key scene) the resourceful Alfred Hitchcock had a ramp installed, so as Rains approaches Bergman on camera he appears taller than his co-star. Claude found this ramp business a bit embarrassing and very funny.

I got another taste of Claude's witty nature shooting a scene in his [next-to-last] film, in which he had a long piece of dialogue. Generally he had no problem remembering his lines despite getting along in years. However, there was one particularly long scene shot late at night where he was having a lot of trouble with the dialogue, and kept making excuses. And finally he paused and said with a sheepish look "Alibi Ike, good old Alibi Ike" ("Alibi Ike" being an expression based on a 1935 film of the same name, in which the lead character has a penchant for making up excuses). Of course in the finished film, he played the scene flawlessly, as he always did. Claude Rains: truly a class act, on and off screen.

Many years after Rains had gone to Hollywood and become a well-known film actor, John Gielgud commented, tongue-in-cheek:

There was somebody who taught me a very great deal at drama school, and I am certainly grateful to him for his kindness and consideration. His name was Claude Rains. I don't know whatever happened to him. I think he failed, and had to go to America.

Gielgud later went on to recollect a time when he was in New York and in the audience during an event that included a focus on Bette Davis: "A number of clips from many of her most successful films were shown and I was particularly delighted, when, as soon as Claude Rains appeared in the close-up of one of the clips, the whole audience burst into a great wave of applause."

Bette Davis often cited Rains as one of her favorite actors and colleagues. Gielgud said that he once wrote, "The London stage suffered a great loss when Claude Rains deserted it for motion pictures," and that he later added, "but when I see him now on the screen and remember him, I must admit that the London stage's loss was the cinema's gain. And the striking virtuosity that I witnessed as a young actor is now there for audiences everywhere to see for all time. I'm so glad of that."

== Personal life and death ==
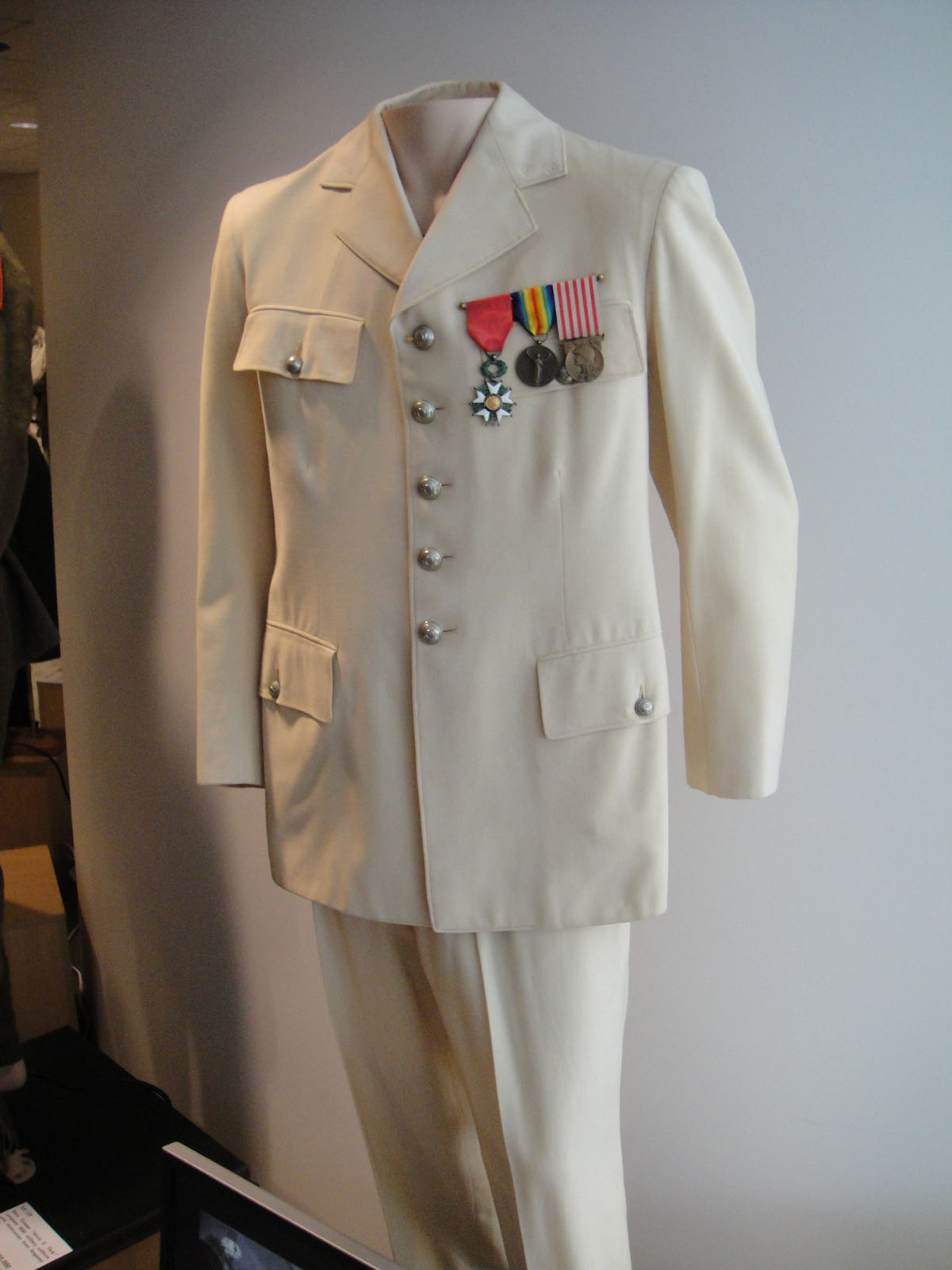
The ivory military uniform Rains wore in Casablanca was sold at auction in 2011 for $55,000.

Rains became a naturalized citizen of the United States in 1939.

He married six times and divorced five times: Isabel Jeans (1913-1915), Marie Hemingway (1920-1920), Beatrix Thomson (1924-1935), Frances Propper (1935-1956), and Agi Jambor (1959-1960). In 1960, he married Rosemary Clark Schrode, to whom he was married until her death in December 1964. His only child, Jennifer, was the daughter of Frances Propper. As an actress, she is known as Jessica Rains.

In 1941, Rains acquired the 380-acre (1.5 km^{2}) Stock Grange Farm, built in 1747 in West Bradford Township, Pennsylvania. Rains spent his final years in Sandwich, New Hampshire.

A chronic alcoholic, Rains died from cirrhosis of the liver, having an abdominal hemorrhage in Laconia on 30 May 1967, aged 77. He was buried at the Red Hill Cemetery in Moultonborough, New Hampshire.

In 2010, many of Rains' personal effects were put into an auction at Heritage Auctions, including his 1951 Tony award, rare posters, letters, photographs, and volumes of his private leather-bound scrapbooks, which contained his press cuttings and reviews from his career. In 2011, the ivory military uniform and medals he wore as Captain Renault in Casablanca auctioned when noted actress and film historian Debbie Reynolds sold her collection of Hollywood costumes and memorabilia that she had amassed as a result of the 1970 MGM auction.

== Theatre credits ==
Rains starred in multiple plays and productions over the course of his career, playing a variety of leading and supporting parts. As his film career began to flourish, he found less time to perform in the theatre in both England and America.

Year	Title	Role(s)	Venue	Notes	Ref.
1900	Sweet Nell of Old Drury		Haymarket Theatre	Stage debut, aged 10 as an "unbilled child extra "running around a fountain."	
1901	Herod		His Majesty's Theatre	Unbilled	
1904	Last of the Dandies	Winkles	His Majesty's Theatre	Rains' debut speaking role in the theatre	
1911	The Gods of the Mountain	Thahn	Haymarket Theatre	Shared role with Reginald Owen	
1912-13	Typhoon	Omayi	Haymarket Theatre	First heavy character role	
1913	The Green Cockatoo	Grasset	Aldwych Theatre	Also stage manager	
1919	Reparation	Ivan Petrovitch	St. James's Theatre	Also stage manager	
1919	Uncle Ned	Mears	Lyceum Theatre	Marked Rains' return to the stage after being wounded in WWI	
1919-20	The Jest		Prince's Theatre, Bristol		
1920	Julius Caesar	Casca	St. James's Theatre		
1921-22	Will Shakespeare		Shaftesbury Theatre		
1922	The Bat	Billy	St. James's Theatre		
1922-23	The Rumour		Globe Theatre		
1922-23	Pictures from the Insects' Life	Lepidopterist, Parasite, Chief Engineer	Regent Theatre		
1923	Robert E. Lee	David Peel	Regent Theatre		
1923	Good Luck	Earl of Trenton	Theatre Royal, Drury Lane		
1923	Reparation		Royal Academy of Dramatic Art	As director	
1925	The Rivals	Faulkland	Lyric Hammersmith		
1926	The Government Inspector	The Inspector	Gaiety Theatre	Professional debut of his RADA student, Charles Laughton	
1926	Made in Heaven	Martin Walmer	Everyman Theatre, London	Rains' last appearance on the London Stage.	
1927	The Constant Nymph	Roberto	Selwyn Theatre	Replacement, Broadway debut	
1927	Lally	Lally	Greenwich Village Theatre		
1927	Out of the Sea	Arthur Logris	Eltinge Theatre		
1929	The Camel Through the Needle's Eye	Joseph Vilim	Martin Beck Theatre, Guild Theatre		
1929-30	The Game of Love and Death	Lazare Carnot	Guild Theatre		
1930	The Apple Cart	Proteus	Martin Beck Theatre		
1930	The Apple Cart	Proteus	Alvin Theatre		
1931	Miracle at Verdun	Heydner, Messenger, Lamparenne	Martin Beck Theatre		
1931	He	Elevator Man	Guild Theatre		
1932	The Moon in the Yellow River	Dobelle	Guild Theatre		
1932	Too True to Be Good	The Elder	Guild Theatre		
1932	The Man Who Reclaimed His Head	Paul Verin	Broadhurst Theatre		
1932	The Good Earth	Wang Lung	Guild Theatre		
1933	American Dream	Ezekial Bell	Guild Theatre		
1951	Darkness at Noon	Rubashov	Alvin Theatre	Won Tony Award for Best Actor in a Play	
1951	Darkness at Noon	Rubashov	Royale Theatre	Won Tony Award for Best Actor in a Play	
1954	The Confidential Clerk	Sir Claude Mulhammer	Morosco Theatre		
1956	Night of the Auk	Dr. Bruner	Playhouse Theatre		

== Filmography ==
=== Film ===
Year	Title	Role	Director	Notes
1920	Build Thy House	Clarkis	Fred Goodwins	Film debut
1933	The Invisible Man	Dr. Jack Griffin/The Invisible Man	James Whale	
1934	Crime Without Passion	Lee Gentry	Ben Hecht, Charles MacArthur	
1934	The Man Who Reclaimed His Head	Paul Verin	Edward Ludwig	
1935	The Mystery of Edwin Drood	John Jasper	Stuart Walker	
1935	The Clairvoyant	Maximus	Maurice Elvey	
1935	The Last Outpost	John Stevenson	Louis Gasnier, Charles Barton	
1936	Hearts Divided	Napoleon Bonaparte	Frank Borzage	
1936	Anthony Adverse	Marquis Don Luis	Mervyn LeRoy	
1937	Stolen Holiday	Stefan Orloff	Michael Curtiz	
1937	The Prince and the Pauper	Earl of Hertford	William Keighley	
1937	They Won't Forget	District Attorney Andrew J. "Andy" Griffin	Mervyn LeRoy	
1938	White Banners	Paul Ward	Edmund Goulding	
1938	Gold is Where You Find It	Colonel Christopher "Chris" Ferris	Michael Curtiz	
1938	The Adventures of Robin Hood	Prince John	Michael Curtiz	
1938	Four Daughters	Adam Lemp	Michael Curtiz	
1939	They Made Me a Criminal	Detective Monty Phelan	Busby Berkeley	
1939	Juarez	Emperor Louis Napoleon III	William Dieterle	
1939	Sons of Liberty	Haym Salomon	Michael Curtiz	Two-reel short
1939	Daughters Courageous	Jim Masters	Michael Curtiz	
1939	Mr. Smith Goes to Washington	Senator Joseph Harrison Paine	Frank Capra	Nominated- Academy Award for Best Supporting Actor
1939	Four Wives	Adam Lemp	Michael Curtiz	
1940	Saturday's Children	Mr. Henry Halevy	Vincent Sherman	
1940	The Sea Hawk	Don José Álvarez de Córdoba	Michael Curtiz	
1940	Lady with Red Hair	David Belasco	Curtis Bernhardt	
1941	Four Mothers	Adam Lemp	William Keighley	
1941	Here Comes Mr. Jordan	Mr. Jordan	Alexander Hall	
1941	The Wolf Man	Sir John Talbot	George Waggner	
1942	Kings Row	Dr. Alexander Tower	Sam Wood	
1942	Moontide	Nutsy	Archie Mayo	
1942	Now, Voyager	Dr. Jaquith	Irving Rapper	
1942	Casablanca	Captain Louis Renault	Michael Curtiz	Nominated- Academy Award for Best Supporting Actor
1943	Forever and a Day	Ambrose Pomfret	Herbert Wilcox (sequence with Rains)	
1943	Phantom of the Opera	Erique Claudin/The Phantom of the Opera	Arthur Lubin	
1944	Passage to Marseille	Captain Freycinet	Michael Curtiz	
1944	Mr. Skeffington	Job Skeffington	Vincent Sherman	Nominated- Academy Award for Best Supporting Actor
1945	Strange Holiday	John Stevenson	Arch Oboler	
1945	This Love of Ours	Joseph Targel	William Dieterle	
1945	Caesar and Cleopatra	Julius Caesar	Gabriel Pascal	
1946	Notorious	Alexander Sebastian	Alfred Hitchcock	Nominated- Academy Award for Best Supporting Actor
1946	Angel on My Shoulder	Nick	Archie Mayo	
1946	Deception	Alexander Hollenius	Irving Rapper	
1947	The Unsuspected	Victor Grandison	Michael Curtiz	
1949	The Passionate Friends	Howard Justin	David Lean	
1949	Rope of Sand	Arthur "Fred" Martingale	William Dieterle	
1949	Song of Surrender	Elisha Hunt	Mitchell Leisen	
1950	The White Tower	Paul DeLambre	Ted Tetzlaff	
1950	Where Danger Lives	Frederick Lannington	John Farrow	
1951	Sealed Cargo	Captain Skalder	Alfred L. Werker	
1952	The Man Who Watched the Trains Go By	Kees Popinga	Harold French	
1956	Lisbon	Aristides Mavros	Ray Milland	
1959	This Earth Is Mine	Philippe Rambeau	Henry King	
1960	The Lost World	Professor George Edward Challenger	Irwin Allen	
1961	Battle of the Worlds	Professor Benson	Antonio Margheriti	
1962	Lawrence of Arabia	Mr. Dryden	David Lean	
1963	Twilight of Honor	Art Harper	Boris Sagal	
1965	The Greatest Story Ever Told	Herod the Great	George Stevens	

=== Television ===
Year	Title	Role	Notes
1953	Medallion Theatre		2 episodes
1954	Omnibus	Father	Episode: "The Confidential Clerk"
1956	Kraft Television Theatre	Narrator	Episode: "A Night to Remember"
1956	The Alcoa Hour	Paul Westman	Episode:"The President"
1956	The Kaiser Aluminum Hour	Creon	Episode: "Antigone"
1956	Eye on New York	Dr. Bruner	Episode: "Night of the Auk"
1957	On Borrowed Time	Mr. Brink	TV movie
1957	The Pied Piper of Hamelin	Mayor of Hamelin	TV movie
1956-62	Alfred Hitchcock Presents	Various roles	5 episodes
1959	Once Upon a Christmas Time	John Woodcutter	TV movie
1959	Playhouse 90	Judge Haywood	Episode: "Judgment at Nuremberg"
1960	Hallmark Hall of Fame	High Lama	Episode: "Shangri-La"
1960	Naked City	John Winfield Weston	Episode: "To Walk in Silence"
1960	Mel-O-Toons	Narrator (voice)	Episode: "David and Goliath"
1962	Wagon Train	Judge Daniel Clay	Episode: "The Daniel Clay Story"
1962	Sam Benedict	Thonis Jundelin	Episode: "Nor Practice Makes Perfect"
1962-63	The DuPont Show of the Week	Colonel, Baron van der Zost	2 episodes
1963	Rawhide	Alexander Longford	Episode: "Incident of Judgement Day"
1963-65	Bob Hope Presents the Chrysler Theatre	Mr. Fare, Valentin	2 episodes
1964	Dr. Kildare	Edward Fredericks	Episode: "Why Won't Anyone Listen?"
1964	The Reporter	John Vance	Episode: "A Time to Be Silent"

== Radio appearances ==
Year	Programme	Episode/source
1949	Ford Theatre	The Horn Blows at Midnight
1952	Cavalcade of America	Three Words

== Discography ==
Year	Title	Recording Company
1946	The Christmas Tree	Mercury Childcraft Records
1948	Bible Stories for Children	Capitol Records
1950	Builders of America	Columbia Masterworks
1952	David and Goliath	Capitol Records
1957	The Song of Songs and Heloise and Abelard	Caedmon Records
1960	Remember The Alamo	Noble Records
1962	Enoch Arden	Columbia Masterworks

== Awards and nominations ==
=== Academy Awards ===
Year	Category	Nominated work	Result	Ref.
1939	Best Supporting Actor	Mr. Smith Goes to Washington	Nominated	
1943	Best Supporting Actor	Casablanca	Nominated	
1944	Best Supporting Actor	Mr. Skeffington	Nominated	
1946	Best Supporting Actor	Notorious	Nominated	

=== Drama League Awards ===
Year	Category	Nominated work	Result	Ref.
1951	Distinguished Performance Award	Darkness at Noon	Won	

=== Grammy Awards ===
Year	Category	Nominated work	Result	Ref.
1962	Best Documentary or Spoken Word Recording (Other Than Comedy)	Enoch Arden	Nominated	

=== Online Film & Television Association Awards ===
Year	Honor	Result	Ref.
2023	Film Hall of Fame: Actors	Inducted	

=== Tony Awards ===
Year	Category	Nominated work	Result	Ref.
1951	Best Actor in a Play	Darkness at Noon	Won	

== See also ==
- List of British actors
- List of Academy Award winners and nominees from Great Britain
- List of actors with Academy Award nominations
- List of actors with more than one Academy Award nomination in the acting categories

== General sources ==
- Harmetz, Aljean (1992). Round Up the Usual Suspects: The Making of "Casablanca" (hardcover) (First ed.). Westport, CT: Hyperion. ISBN 978-1-56282-941-4.
- Soister, John T.; Wioskowski, JoAnna (2006). Claude Rains: A Comprehensive Illustrated Reference to His Work in Film, Stage, Radio, Television and Recordings (softcover) (Reprint ed.). Jefferson, NC: McFarland. ISBN 978-0-7864-2855-7. OCLC 41580407.
- Skal, David J. (2008). Claude Rains: An Actor's Voice (hardcover) (First ed.). Lexington, KY: The University Press of Kentucky. ISBN 978-1-7200-3837-5. JSTOR j.ctt2jcg4f.
