= Wang Lung =

Fictional character from Pearl S. Buck's The Good Earth novel

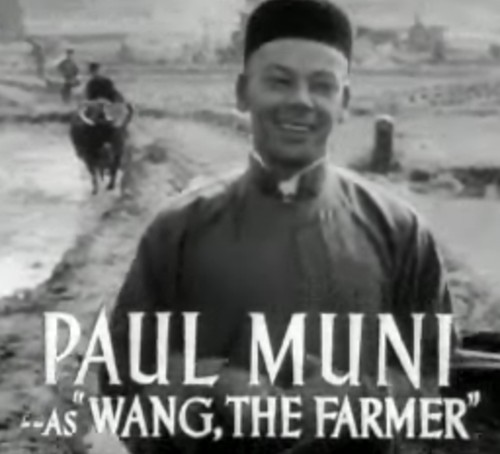
- Paul Muni as Wang Lung in the 1937 film of The Good Earth
- Portrayed by: Paul Muni

In-universe information
- Occupation: Farmer
- Spouses: O-Lan, Lotus
- Nationality: Chinese

Wang Lung
- Traditional Chinese: 王龍
- Simplified Chinese: 王龙
Transcriptions
Standard Mandarin
- Hanyu Pinyin: Wáng Lóng

Wang Lung is the protagonist of The Good Earth, a Pulitzer Prize-winning novel by Pearl S. Buck and the first volume of her House of Earth trilogy.

== Character biography ==
Lung begins life as a poor farmer and marries O-Lan, a slave owned by the Hwang family. Wang Lung maintains a fierce attachment to the land. However, he is also extremely ambitious and envies the material success of the wealthy Hwangs. He is increasingly drawn to the Hwangs’ decadent lifestyle, and in the end, after his encounters with modern values portrayed through his time in the city, his experiences with his uncle and his cousin, and at one point his morally corrupt actions in the city, his piety and love of the land is only partially successful in helping him maintain his good character and moral standing. His excessive pride is his tragic flaw, as his actions often reflect on his position among others in his society and his position compared to the Hwang family.

He has a total of six children, three sons and three daughters, but the second daughter, born during a severe famine, is strangled by O-Lan shortly after birth. The older surviving daughter, who comes to be known as the "poor fool," exhibits severe mental disabilities and is unable to care for herself throughout her life. Wang Lung arranges a marriage for the youngest daughter to the son of a prosperous grain merchant, in order to keep her safe from his uncle's lustful son. The sons, who come to be known as "The Landlord," "The Merchant," and "The Tiger" (oldest to youngest), are the focus of Sons, the second book in the trilogy. A House Divided completes the family tale by following Wang Lung's grandchildren, primarily the Tiger's son Wang Yuan.
