= O-Lan =

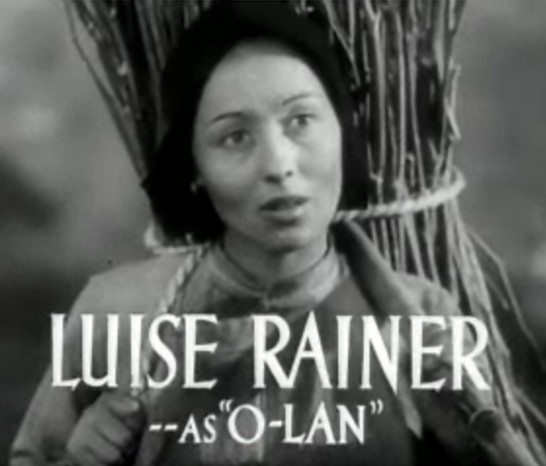
- Luise Rainer as O-Lan in the 1937 film of The Good Earth
- Portrayed by: Luise Rainer

In-universe information
- Occupation: Cook, Beggar
- Spouse: Wang Lung
- Nationality: Chinese

O-Lan
- Traditional Chinese: 玉蘭
Transcriptions
Standard Mandarin
- Hanyu Pinyin: Yùlán

O-Lan is a fictional character in Pearl S. Buck's 1931 novel The Good Earth. For her portrayal of the character in the 1937 film adaptation, Luise Rainer won the Academy Award for Best Actress.

== Character biography ==
She is a slave of the House of Hwang who gains her freedom when she marries the novel's protagonist, Wang Lung. They start a family in their small country town, and endure grueling times, including droughts, floods, and war. Wang Lung and O-Lan work hard to ensure their family's survival, and their persistence finally prevails when the land produces great riches.

O-Lan is a skilled cook, having worked in the kitchens as a slave. When O-Lan first arrives at Wang Lung's house, she prepares a deliciously cooked meal. In response to Wang Lung's questions of her dexterity, she blandly replies, "I have been kitchen slave since I went into the House of Hwang. There were meats at every meal." Wang Lung received many compliments from his family and friends for O-Lan's dinner.

=== Move to Southern China ===
Wang-Lung and O-Lan reluctantly move to a southern city to escape starvation. O-Lan is an experienced beggar, which she learned in her youth; she uses her childhood begging talents to assist the family in surviving the dilemmas of the city. She knows who to plead to, where to beg, and teaches the children to beg.

Wang Lung eventually casts O-Lan aside when he becomes enamoured with a prostitute named Lotus. He takes Lotus as a second wife, which devastates O-Lan; she is especially unhappy when Lotus brings Cuckoo, a former slave of the House of Hwang, as her personal servant. O-Lan resents Cuckoo for being haughty and cold when they were both slaves, and reminds her that while Cuckoo is still a slave, O-Lan is the lady of a prosperous household, a first wife, and the mother of sons.

=== Illness and death ===
After giving birth to twins, a boy and a girl, O-lan becomes barren, saying "There is a fire in my vitals". She repeats this throughout the years. One day around the time Wang Lung began to feel guilt for casting her aside, she can no longer leave her room. Wang Lung summons the town's doctor who says among other things, that she has a tumor in her abdomen and "worms in her heart." The doctor says then that it will cost 500 pieces of silver to help her, but, O-lan refuses, saying good land could be bought with that money. Wang Lung ignores her and exclaims that he has the money. Upon hearing this, the doctor says that the color of her eyes are different and treatment will cost 5,000 pieces of silver. Wang Lung realizes that she will die. Over the next years, O-lan becomes weaker and begins to fall into fits. She constantly shows how much Wang Lung has hurt her when she repeatedly murmurs at the end "I am ugly and cannot be loved". In the end, Wang Lung cannot bear to be in her presence. When O-lan finally dies after seeing her eldest son married, she was buried with her father-in-law on Wang Lung's land.

O-Lan's intelligence, talents, and hard work are crucial to Wang Lung's success. After her death, there is no one in the household to manage their finances carefully; their oldest son spends money constantly, while their second son insists on hoarding their money. Without O-Lan, Wang Lung has difficulty controlling the household.

== See also ==
- The Good Earth, a Pulitzer Prize–winning novel by Pearl S. Buck
- Wang Lung
