= Big City (1937 film) =

1937 film by Frank Borzage, George B. Seitz

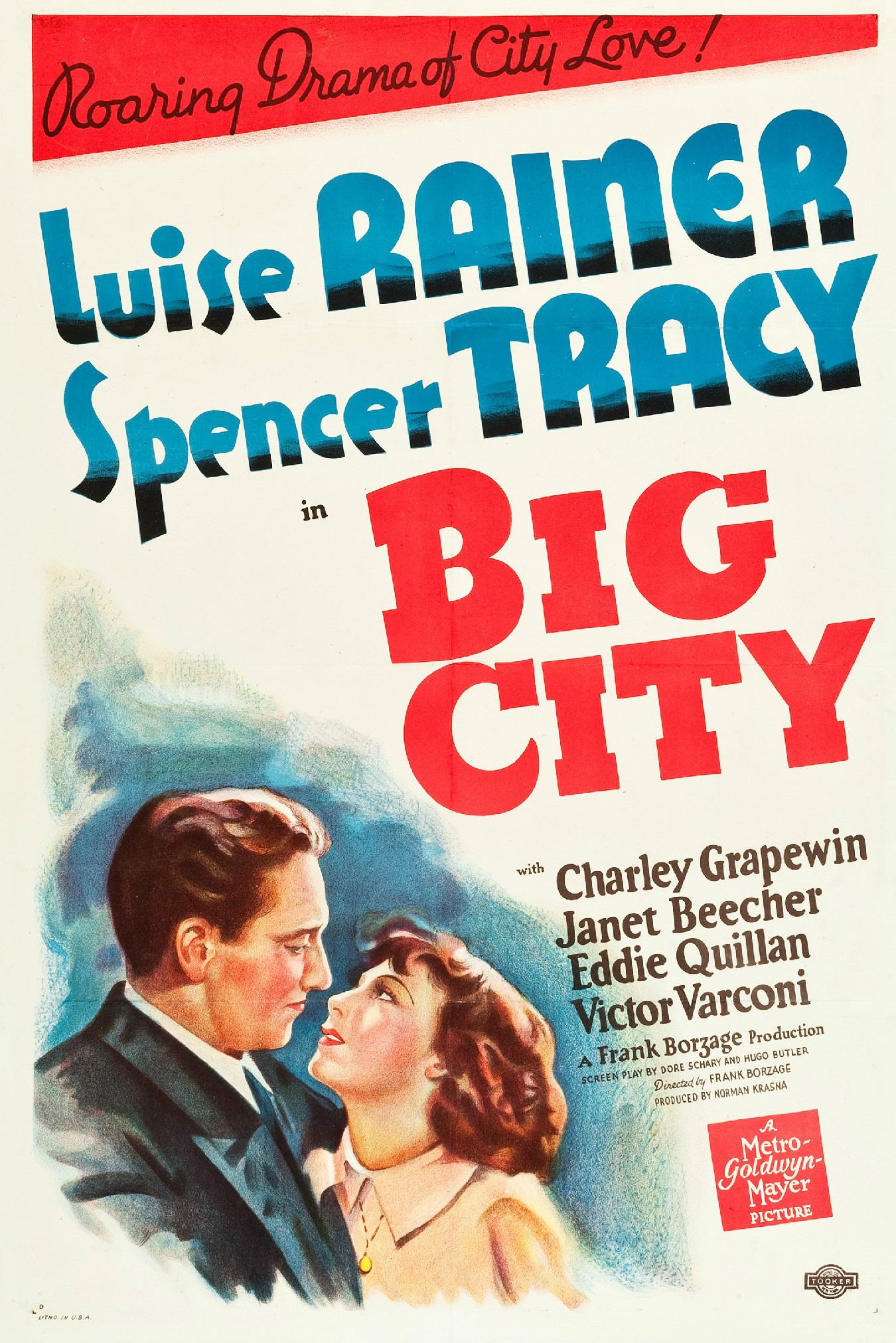
- Theatrical release poster
- Directed by: Frank Borzage
- Written by: Norman Krasna; Dore Schary; Hugo Butler
- Produced by: Frank Borzage; Norman Krasna
- Starring: Luise Rainer; Spencer Tracy
- Cinematography: Joseph Ruttenberg
- Edited by: Frederick Y. Smith
- Music by: William Axt
- Production company: Metro-Goldwyn-Mayer
- Distributed by: Loew's Inc.
- Release dates: September 15, 1937 (Los Angeles); September 16, 1937 (New York)
- Running time: 80 minutes
- Country: United States
- Language: English
- Budget: $621,000
- Box office: $1,601,000

Big City is a 1937 American drama film directed by Frank Borzage and starring Luise Rainer and Spencer Tracy. The film was also released as Skyscraper Wilderness.

== Plot ==
In New York City, taxi cab driver Joe Benton is happily married to Anna, an immigrant, but they are caught up in the ongoing taxi "war" between an association of independent cabbies like Joe and a corporate firm that is using strong-arm tactics to dominate the trade. Following a birthday party at which Anna announces that she is pregnant, she asks a friend to take a package with a raincoat to the garage where her brother works. An explosion occurs at the garage, and an attendant is shot by one of the corporate thugs.

Anna becomes a scapegoat for the disaster when city officials decide to avoid a trial by deporting her. Before that can happen, though, Anna is hidden in different friends' apartments until she can no longer bear the problems that she has brought to them, and she turns herself in. Joe visits her on the ship that will take her away, hoping that a last-minute appeal will allow her to stay. In the course of rounding up friends for help, he discovers the truth behind the bombing and races to find the mayor, who is at a celebratory dinner at Jack Dempsey's Broadway Restaurant, where a number of professional boxers, wrestlers, and other athletes are also attending.

Joe is able to convince the mayor, and they—along with other cabbies and the guests from the restaurant—speed to the docks. The mayor stops the ship from sailing, and Anna, who is now about to give birth, is put in an ambulance. The competing thugs, however, arrive on the scene and start a fistfight that is won by Joe and his friends and the professional athletes. When the fight ends, Joe learns that Anna has given birth to a boy. The final scene takes place a bit later, where an Orthodox priest christens the boy with the first names of Joe and his fellow drivers.

== Cast ==
- Luise Rainer as Anna Benton
- Spencer Tracy as Joe Benton
- Charley Grapewin as Robert, the Mayor
- Janet Beecher as Sophie Sloane
- Eddie Quillan as Mike Edwards
- Victor Varconi as Paul Roya
- Oscar O'Shea as John C. Andrews
- Helen Troy as Lola Johnson
- William Demarest as Beecher
- John Arledge as Bud
- Irving Bacon as Jim Sloane
- Guinn "Big Boy" Williams as Danny Devlin
- Regis Toomey as Fred Hawkins
- Edgar Dearing as Tom Reilley
- Paul Harvey as District Attorney Gilbert
- Andrew Tombes as Inspector Matthews
- Clem Bevans as Grandpa Sloane
- Grace Ford as Mary Reilley
- Alice White as Peggy Devlin
- Paul Fix as Comet Night Watchman (uncredited)
- Ray Walker as Eddie Donogan, Independent Cab Driver (uncredited)
- George Godfrey as himself

The professional athletes who make cameo appearances, toward the end of the film, include Jack Dempsey, James J. Jeffries, Jim Thorpe, Frank Wykoff, Jimmy McLarnin, Maxie Rosenbloom, Jackie Fields, Man Mountain Dean, Gus Sonnenberg, Cotton Warburton, Bull Montana, and Snowy Baker.

== Reception ==
In a contemporary review for The New York Times, critic Frank S. Nugent called Big City "casual, superficially diverting, singularly unimportant stuff" and wrote: "By any other names, except possibly those of Luise Rainer and Spencer Tracy, the Capitol's 'Big City' would be Class B melodrama and nothing more. With them, it becomes a trifle more, but still not enough to justify more than a passing glance."

Critic Edwin Schallert of the Los Angeles Times called Big City "almost delirious fun" with "ingenious sequences" and wrote: "Matching up performers in the movies can be a fine art, and occasionally one sees the demonstrating of such art. Premier example of the moment is the film 'Big City', which finds Spencer Tracy and Luise Rainer cast together—an acting combination as good as anyone could request. They have much to do with the appeal of this story of poor struggling married folk."

Writing for Night and Day in 1937, Graham Greene gave the film a poor review, describing it as "just possible to sit through". Greene's primary complaint was about the acting, which he found to be "heavily laid on" with "people in this film [being] too happy before disaster: no one is as happy as all that, no one so little prepared for what life is bound to do sooner or later". The only consolation for Greene was that of Borzage's direction, which Greene described as "sentimental but competent".

=== Box office ===
According to MGM records, the film earned $906,000 in the U.S. and Canada, and $695,000 elsewhere, resulting in a profit of $462,000.
