= Escapade (1935 film) =

1935 film by Robert Zigler Leonard

- Theatrical release poster
- Directed by: Robert Z. Leonard
- Written by: Herman J. Mankiewicz; Walter Reisch; Willi Forst
- Produced by: Bernard H. Hyman; Robert Z. Leonard
- Starring: William Powell; Luise Rainer; Frank Morgan; Virginia Bruce
- Cinematography: Ernest Haller
- Edited by: Tom Held
- Music by: Bronislau Kaper; Walter Jurmann
- Production company: Metro-Goldwyn-Mayer
- Distributed by: Loew's Inc.
- Release date: July 6, 1935
- Running time: 93 minutes
- Country: United States
- Language: English
- Budget: $467,000
- Box office: $975,000

Escapade is a 1935 American romantic comedy film directed by Robert Z. Leonard starring William Powell, Luise Rainer and Frank Morgan. It is a remake of the 1934 Austrian film Maskerade by Willi Forst.

== Plot ==
Set somewhere in Vienna in the 1900s, a successful surgeon, Karl, fearing for the affection of his wife Gerta. As does his brother Paul, a concert conductor, for his flirtatious girl Anita. Both women have something in common: they are in love with Fritz, a philandering painter. The surgeon's wife contacts the artist and allows herself to be painted while only dressed in furs, with her face covered by a mask. The painting headlines the newspapers, and the entire city wonders who the mysterious masked lady is. The surgeon recognizes his brother's fiancee's furs in the painting, and is troubled. He is unaware that his own wife has borrowed the fur, though, and feels terribly sorry for his brother.

Together, the brothers decide to confront the artist, but he denies having met either of the men's wife. When the brothers challenge him to a duel if he does not tell them the name of the woman who posed for him, the artist randomly picks the name "Major". In the phone book, it turns out that one lady in Vienna is named Major: Leopoldine. She is the companion of a socially prominent countess, and is startled by the claim that she was the model. The painter falls in love with her, but the prior affair with a married woman causes complications.

== Cast ==
- William Powell as Fritz
- Luise Rainer as Leopoldine Major
- Frank Morgan as Karl
- Virginia Bruce as Gerta
- Reginald Owen as Paul
- Mady Christians as Anita
- Laura Hope Crews as Countess
- Henry Travers as Concierge
- Mathilde Comont as Carmen

== Production ==
Actress Myrna Loy was initially set to star in the female lead. When she dropped out, Louis B. Mayer finally agreed to give Luise Rainer a chance. He had previously discovered her in Germany, though had not assigned her in her American debut yet. By the time she was cast, half of the film was already shot. During the film's first preview, Rainer ran out of the cinema and later said about the event: "On the screen, I looked so big and full of face, it was awful."

== Reception ==
Rainer received rave reviews for her performance. In The Family Circle magazine's August 1935 edition, the following was written of her: "There is no need to tell you about any of the players except Miss Rainer. You are already aware that there is no man on the screen who can top Mr. Powell when it comes to playing the role of a fascinating philanderer. Nor can a word from this observer add anything to the reputations of such artists as Mr. Morgan and Mr. Owen. If either of them ever gave a bad performance, I missed the film. But about Miss Rainer: [..] Her great charm is her simplicity and directness. Because of her wide-eyed facial expressions, the manner in which she pronounces some words, plus certain tricks of inflection in reading lines, Miss Rainer will be accused of imitating Elisabeth Bergner. [..] Miss Rainer can get her laughs, as she proves in that delightful bit in the cafe when she becomes a bit tight and tells Mr. Powell that she does not expect him to take her out again. Great stuff. And in a couple of weeping scenes she demonstrates that she is a first class chest-heaver and hysterics-thrower."

Following the film's release, Rainer was hailed as 'Hollywood's next sensation' and had to do several interviews. By late 1935, with Escapade being her only credit, Rainer was the talk of the town and even got a spread in Photoplay magazine.

== Box office ==
According to MGM records the film earned $577,000 in the US and Canada and $398,000 elsewhere resulting in a profit of $143,000.
