= Agi Jambor =

Hungarian born American classical pianist (1909–1997)

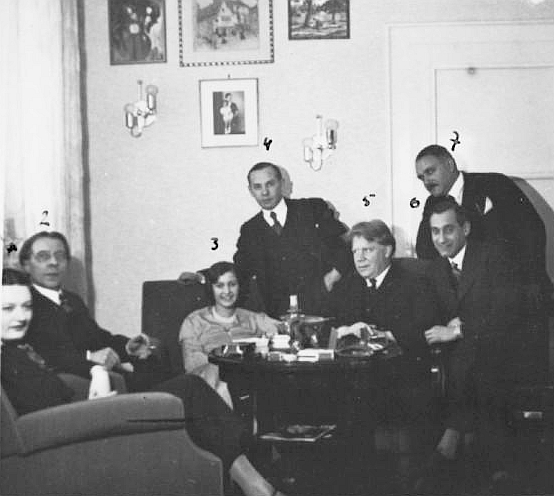
- Agi Jambor (seated centre) with Alfred Cortot (seated to her left) and Edwin Fischer (seated to her right) in 1930
- Born: February 4, 1909; Budapest, Hungary
- Died: February 3, 1997 (aged 87); Baltimore, Maryland, U.S.
- Resting place: Maple Grove Park Cemetery (Hackensack, New Jersey)
- Education: Bryn Mawr College
- Occupations: Concert pianist, Professor
- Notable work: Philadelphia Orchestra
- Spouse(s): Imre Patai (1933-1949) (his death); Claude Rains (1959-1960) (divorced)

Agi Jambor (February 4, 1909 – February 3, 1997) was a Hungarian-born pianist.

== Biography ==
Jambor was born in 1909 in Budapest, Hungary, the half-Jewish daughter of a wealthy businessman and a prominent piano teacher. A piano prodigy, she was playing Mozart before she could read and at age 12 made her debut with a symphony orchestra.

From 1926 to 1931, Jambor studied piano with Edwin Fischer at the Berlin University of the Arts. In the early 1930s, at the height of her popularity, she fled to Paris and into exile, preferring playing practice piano in a dance studio to performing on the concert stage.

In 1933, Jambor married Imre Patai, a physicist and pianist. In 1937 she won Fifth Prize at the III International Chopin Piano Competition in Warsaw.

Trapped with her husband when the Nazis overran Holland, and unable to escape to the United States, she later returned to Hungary, which was still neutral. She had a baby, a son who died within two weeks. A picture of the infant would remain on her bedside table the rest of her life.

The Nazis invaded in 1944 and Jambor participated in the Resistance, often dressed as a prostitute in seductive clothes and heavy makeup, calling herself Maryushka /Mariska/. She refused to return to or perform in Germany again.

She and her husband came to the United States in 1947. Her husband died two years later, his health destroyed by the war.

Between 1955 and 1957, Jambor recorded five albums for Capitol Records in New York City, New York.

After leaving Baltimore for Philadelphia in 1957, she began performing with the Philadelphia Orchestra, where she became a favorite soloist of Eugene Ormandy and was acclaimed by conductor Bruno Walter. She received rave reviews and made 12 recordings for Capitol Records.

She also became professor of classical piano at Bryn Mawr College, which named her professor emeritus in 1974.

She was married to actor Claude Rains from 1959 to 1960.

Jambor died of cancer at Gilchrist Center of Greater Baltimore Medical Center in Towson, Maryland on February 3, 1997, one day before her 88th birthday.
