= Luise Rainer =

German-born actress (1910–2014)

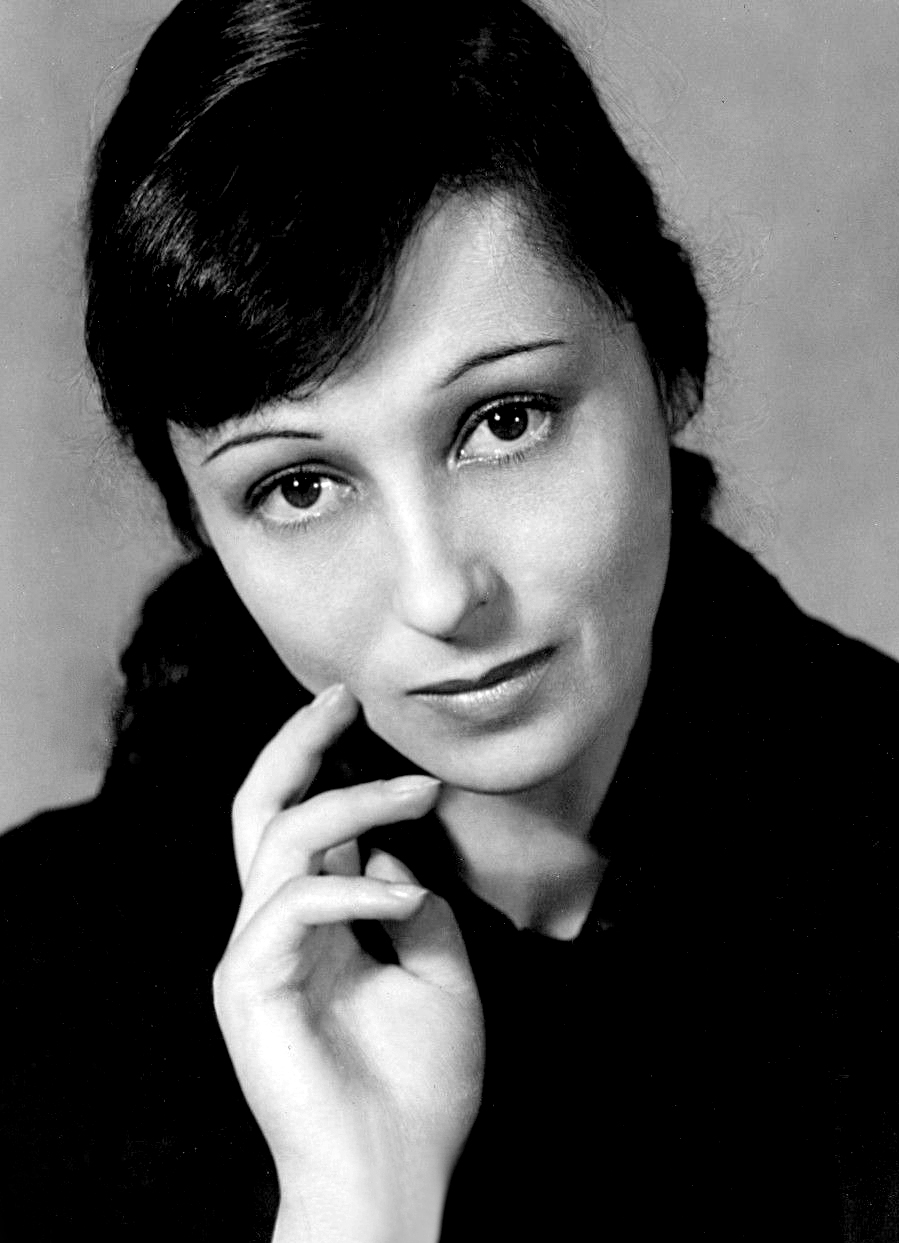
- Rainer in 1941
- Born: 12 January 1910; Düsseldorf, Prussia, German Empire
- Died: 30 December 2014 (aged 104); Belgravia, London, England
- Citizenship: Germany; United States; United Kingdom
- Occupation: Actress
- Years active: 1926–2003
- Known for: The Great Ziegfeld; The Good Earth
- Spouses: Clifford Odets (m. 1937; div. 1940) Robert Knittel (m. 1945; died 1989)
- Children: 1
- Awards: Academy Award for Best Actress

Luise Rainer (/ˈraɪnər/ RY-nər, German: [ˈʁaɪnɐ]; 12 January 1910 – 30 December 2014) was a German-born film actress. She was the first thespian to win multiple Academy Awards, and the first to win back-to-back; at the time of her death, thirteen days shy of her 105th birthday, she was the longest-lived Oscar recipient (and the longest-lived female star from Classic Hollywood), a superlative that has not been exceeded, as of 2026.

Rainer started her acting career in Germany at age 16, under the tutelage of Austria's leading stage director, Max Reinhardt. Within a few years, she had become a distinguished Berlin stage actress with Reinhardt's Vienna theater ensemble. Critics highly praised the quality of her acting. After years of acting on stage and in films in Austria and Germany, she was discovered by Metro-Goldwyn-Mayer talent scouts, who signed her to a three-year contract in Hollywood in 1935. A number of filmmakers predicted she might become another Greta Garbo, MGM's leading female star at the time.

Her first American film role was in Escapade in 1935. The following year she was given a supporting part in the musical biography The Great Ziegfeld, where, despite limited appearances, her emotion-filled performance so impressed audiences that she was awarded the Academy Award for Best Actress. She was later dubbed the "Viennese teardrop" for her dramatic telephone scene in the film. For her next role, producer Irving Thalberg was convinced, despite the studio's disagreement, that she would also be able to play the part of a poor, plain Chinese farm wife in The Good Earth (1937), based on Pearl Buck's novel about hardship in China. The subdued character role was such a dramatic contrast to her previous vivacious character that she again won the Academy Award for Best Actress. Rainer, Jodie Foster and Hilary Swank are the only actresses ever to win two Oscars by the age of 30.

However, she later stated nothing worse could have happened to her than winning two consecutive Oscars, as audience expectations from then on would be too high to fulfill. After a string of insignificant roles, MGM and Rainer became disappointed, leading her to end her brief three-year film career, soon returning to Europe. Adding to her rapid decline, some feel, was the poor career advice she received from her then-husband, playwright Clifford Odets, along with the unexpected death in 1936 at age 37 of her producer, Irving Thalberg, whom she greatly admired. Some film historians consider her the "most extreme case of an Oscar victim in Hollywood mythology".

== Early life and career ==
The daughter of Heinrich and Emilie (née Königsberger) Rainer, known familiarly as "Heinz" and "Emmy", Rainer was born on 12 January 1910 in Düsseldorf, Germany and raised in Hamburg and later in Vienna, Austria. Some sources list her birthplace as Vienna. Describing her childhood, she stated, "I was born into a world of destruction. The Vienna of my childhood was one of starvation, poverty and revolution." Her father was a businessman who settled in Europe after spending most of his childhood in Texas, where he was sent at the age of six as an orphan. As an adult, Rainer described herself as an American citizen "by birth" due to her father's citizenship status. Rainer's family was upper-class and Jewish, but assimilated enough that she was "unaware of [her] Jewishness" until she was twenty-three. She converted to Christianity in the 1940s, but was later quoted as saying “I do not believe in any religion as it only creates strife".

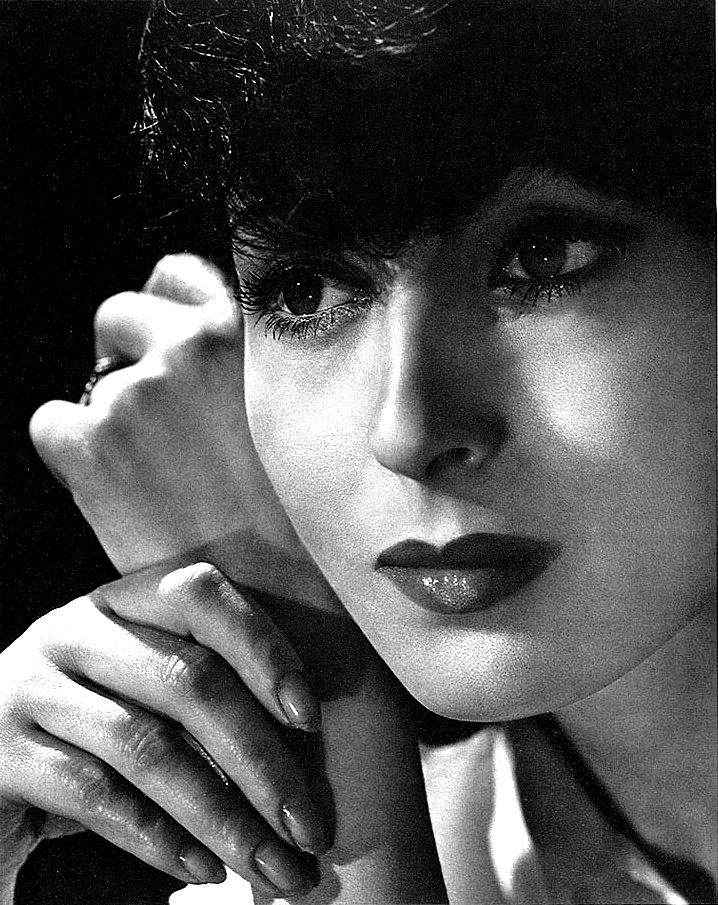
Rainer publicity photo in 1936

Rainer had two brothers and was a premature baby, born two months early. She describes her father as being "possessive" and "tempestuous", but whose affections and concern were centered on her. Luise seemed to him as "eternally absent-minded" and "very different". She remembers his "tyrannical possessiveness", and was saddened to see her mother, "a beautiful pianist, and a woman of warmth and intelligence and deeply in love with her husband, suffering similarly". Although generally shy at home, she was immensely athletic in school, becoming a champion runner and a fearless mountain climber. Rainer said she became an actress to help expend her physical and overly emotional energy. It was her father's wish, however, that she attend a good finishing school and "marry the right man." Rainer's rebellious nature made her appear to be more of a "tomboy" and happy to be alone. She also feared she might develop what she saw as her mother's "inferiority complex".

She was only six when she decided to become part of the entertainment world, and recalled being inspired by watching a circus act:

I thought that a man on the wire was marvelous, in his spangles and tights. I wanted to run away and marry him but I never had an opportunity. I am sure, though, that the experience first disclosed to me the entertainment world. For years I longed to be able to walk on a tight wire, too.

At age 16, Rainer chose to follow her dream to become an actress; under the pretext of visiting her mother, she traveled to Düsseldorf for a prearranged audition at the Dumont Theater.

In the 1920s the theatre director Louise Dumont separated from her husband. Dumont was attached to a number of young actresses including Fita Benkhoff, Hanni Hoessrich, and Rainer. It has been presumed that Dumont was bisexual.

Rainer later began studying acting with Max Reinhardt, and, by the time she was 18, there was already an "army of critics" who felt that she had unusual talent for a young actress. She soon became a distinguished Berlin stage actress as a member of Reinhardt's Vienna theater ensemble. Her first stage appearance was at the Dumont Theater in 1928, followed by other appearances, including Jacques Deval's play Mademoiselle, Kingsley's Men in White, George Bernard Shaw's Saint Joan, Measure for Measure, and Pirandello's Six Characters in Search of an Author.

In 1934, after appearing in several German language films, she was seen performing in the play Six Characters in Search of an Author by MGM talent scout Phil Berg, who offered her a three-year contract in Hollywood. He thought she would appeal to the same audience as Swedish MGM star Greta Garbo. Initially, Rainer had no interest in films, saying in a 1935 interview: "I never wanted to film. I was only for the theater. Then I saw A Farewell to Arms and right away I wanted to film. It was so beautiful."

== Hollywood career ==
=== Early roles ===
Rainer moved to Hollywood in 1935 as a hopeful new star. Biographer Charles Higham notes that MGM studio head Louis B. Mayer and story editor Samuel Marx had seen footage of Rainer before she came to Hollywood, and both felt she had the looks, charm, and especially a "certain tender vulnerability" that Mayer admired in female stars. Because of her poor command of English, Mayer assigned actress Constance Collier to train her in correct speech and dramatic modulation, and Rainer's English improved rapidly.

Her first film role in Hollywood was in Escapade (1935), a remake of one of her Austrian films, co-starring William Powell. She received the part after Myrna Loy gave up her role halfway through filming. After seeing the preview, Rainer ran out of the cinema displeased with how she appeared: "On the screen, I looked so big and full of face, it was awful." The film generated immense publicity for Rainer, who was hailed as "Hollywood's next sensation." However, she did not like giving interviews, explaining:

Stars are not important, only what they do as a part of their work is important. Artists need quiet in which to grow. It seems Hollywood does not like to give them this quiet. Stardom is bad because Hollywood makes too much of it, there is too much 'bowing down' before stars. Stardom is weight pressing down over the head — and one must grow upward or not at all.

=== The Great Ziegfeld (1936) ===
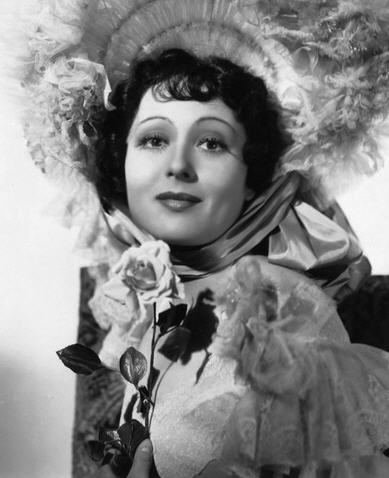
Rainer as Anna Held in The Great Ziegfeld (1936)

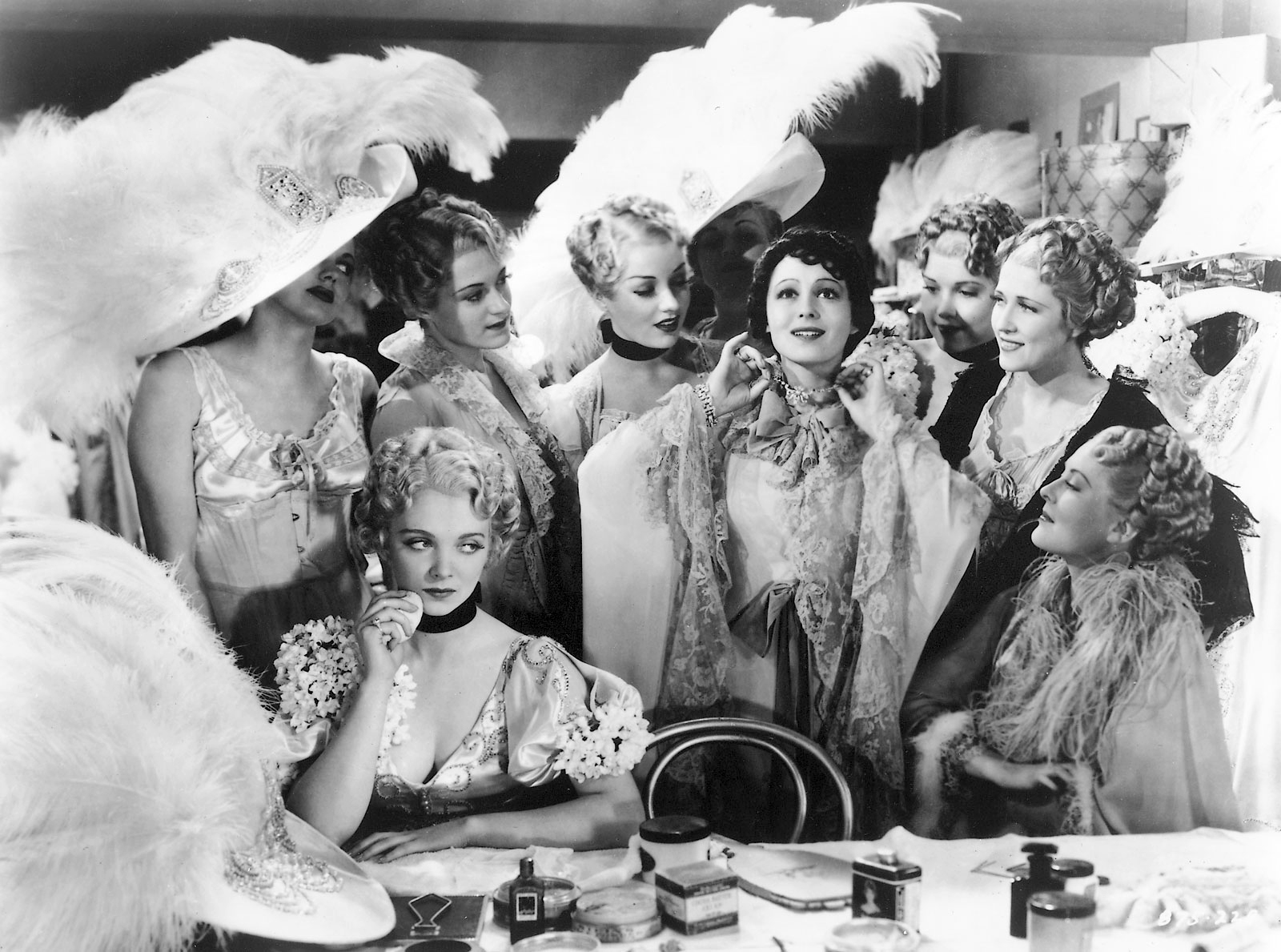
Anna Held (Rainer) exhibits her jewels to the envious Audrey Dane (Virginia Bruce, seated) in The Great Ziegfeld

Rainer's next performance was as the real-life character Anna Held in the musical biography The Great Ziegfeld, again co-starring William Powell. Powell, impressed by Rainer's acting skill, had given her equal billing in Escapade.

According to Higham, Irving Thalberg felt that only Rainer, of all the studio's stars, could play the part as he saw it. But Rainer recalled that studio head Mayer did not want her playing the part, seeing it as too small: "You are a star now and can't do it," he insisted. Shortly after shooting began in late 1935, doubts of Rainer's ability to pull off the role emerged in the press. She was criticized for not resembling the Polish-born stage performer. The director admitted that the main reason Rainer was cast was her eyes, claiming that they "are just as large, just as lustrous, and contain the same tantalizing quality of pseudo naughtiness" the part required.

As Thalberg expected, she successfully expressed the "coquettishness, wide-eyed charm, and vulnerability" required. Rainer "so impressed audiences with one highly emotional scene," wrote biographer Charles Affron, that she received the Academy Award for Best Actress. In one scene, for example, her character is speaking to her ex-husband Florenz Ziegfeld over the telephone, attempting to congratulate him on his new marriage: "The camera records her agitation; Ziegfeld hears a voice that hovers between false gaiety and despair; when she hangs up she dissolves into tears."

Powell, having worked with her in two films, gave his impressions of her acting style and quality:

She is one of the most natural persons I have ever known. Moreover, she is generous, patient and possesses a magnificent sense of humor. She is an extremely sensitive organism and has a great comprehension of human nature. She has judgment and an abiding understanding which make it possible for her to portray human emotion poignantly and truly. Definitely a creative artist, she comprehends life and its significance. Everything she does has been subjected to painstaking analysis. She thinks over every shade of emotion to make it ring true. In Europe she is a great stage star. She deserves to be a star. Unmistakably she has all the qualities.

On the evening of the Academy Award ceremonies, Rainer remained at home, not expecting to win. When Mayer learned she had won, he sent MGM publicity head Howard Strickling racing to her home to get her. When she finally arrived, master of ceremonies George Jessel, during the commotion, made the mistake of introducing Rainer, which Bette Davis had been scheduled to do. She was also awarded the New York Film Critics' Award for the role.

=== The Good Earth (1937) ===
Rainer's next film was The Good Earth (1937), in which she co-starred with Paul Muni; she had been picked as the most likely choice for the female lead in September 1935. The role, however, was completely the opposite of her Anna Held character, as she was required to portray a humble Chinese peasant subservient to her husband and speaking little during the entire film. Her comparative muteness, stated historian Andrew Sarris, was "an astounding tour de force after her hysterically chattering telephone scene in The Great Ziegfeld", and contributed to her winning her second Best Actress Oscar.

The award made her the first actress to win two consecutive Oscars, a feat not matched until Katharine Hepburn's two wins thirty years later. In later years, however, Rainer felt that winning the two Oscars so early may have been the "worst possible thing" to befall her career. She said that it made her "work all the harder now to prove the Academy was right."

Rainer later recalled early conflicts even before production. Studio head Louis B. Mayer, for example, did not approve of the film being produced or her part in it, wanting her to remain a glamorous film star: "He was horrified at Irving Thalberg's insistence for me to play O-lan, the poor uncomely little Chinese peasant," she said. "I myself, with the meager dialogue given to me, feared to be a hilarious bore." Rainer remembered hearing Mayer's comments to Thalberg, her producer: "She has to be a dismal-looking slave and grow old; but Luise is a young girl; we just have made her glamorous — what are you doing?" She considered the part as one of the "greatest achievements" in her career, stating that she was allowed to express "realism," even refusing to "wear the rubber mask 'Chinese look,'" suggested by the makeup department. She was allowed to act "genuine, honest, and down-to-earth," she said.

Other serious problems took place during production. Director George W. Hill, who had spent several months in China filming backgrounds and atmospheric scenes, committed suicide soon after returning to Hollywood. The filming was postponed until Sidney Franklin could take over. A few months later, before the film was completed, Irving Thalberg died suddenly at the age of 37. Rainer commented years later, "His dying was a terrible shock to us. He was young and ever so able. Had it not been that he died, I think I may have stayed much longer in films." The film's opening screen credit includes a dedication to Thalberg: "To the Memory of Irving Grant Thalberg – his last greatest achievement – we dedicate this picture."

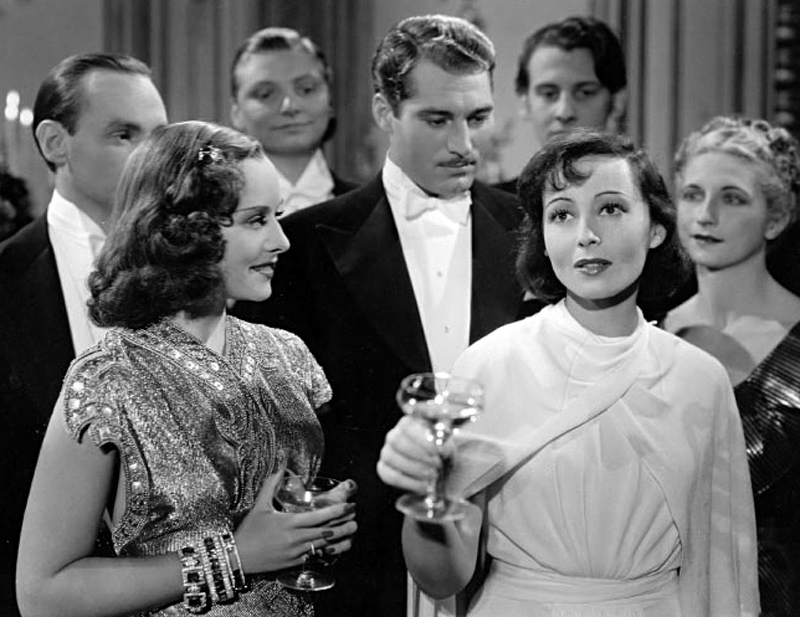
With Paulette Goddard in Dramatic School (1938)

In late 1936, MGM conceived a script called Maiden Voyage especially for Rainer. The project was shelved and eventually released as Bridal Suite in 1939, starring Annabella as 'Luise'. Another 1936 unrealized film project that involved Rainer was Adventure for Three, which would have co-starred William Powell. In 1938, she played Johann Strauss's long-suffering wife Poldi in the successful Oscar-winning MGM musical biopic The Great Waltz, her last big hit.

Her four other films for MGM, The Emperor's Candlesticks (1937) with William Powell, Big City (1937) with Spencer Tracy, The Toy Wife (1938) and Dramatic School (1938), were ill-advised and not well received, though Rainer continued to receive praise. The Emperor's Candlesticks, in which Rainer was cast in November 1936, reunited Rainer with Powell for the final time. For the film, she wore a red wig and wore costumes designed by Adrian, who claimed that Rainer, by the end of 1937, would become one of Hollywood's most influential people in fashion. On set, she received star treatment, having her own dressing room, diction teacher, secretary, wardrobe woman, hairdresser, and makeup artist. The Emperor's Candlesticks was Rainer's first film for which she received criticism, it being claimed that she did not improve in her acting technique.

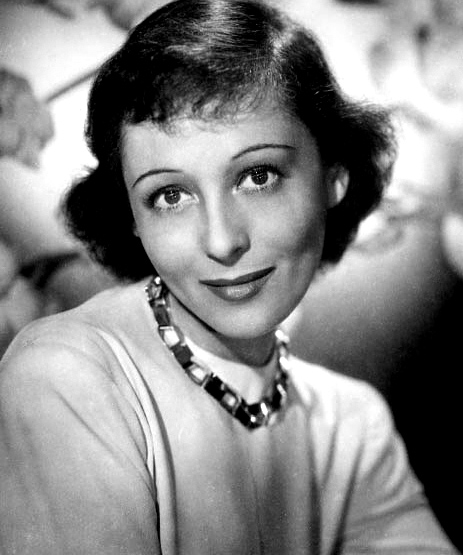
1930s publicity photo

Even though reviews of Rainer's performance in Big City were favorable, reviewers agreed that she was miscast in a 'modern role' and looked "too exotic" as Tracy's wife. Despite the criticism and announcements of leaving Hollywood, Rainer renewed her contract for seven years shortly after the film's release.

Most critics agreed Rainer was "at her most appealing" in The Toy Wife. The final MGM film Rainer made was Dramatic School. At the time she was cast in the film, her box office popularity had declined considerably, and she was one of the many well-known stars—along with MGM colleagues Greta Garbo, Joan Crawford, and Norma Shearer, and Katharine Hepburn, Mae West, Fred Astaire, Kay Francis and others—dubbed "Box Office Poison" by the Independent Theatre Owners of America.

Rainer refused to be stereotyped or to knuckle under to the studio system, and studio head Mayer was unsympathetic to her demands for serious roles. Furthermore, she began to fight for a higher salary, and was reported as being difficult and temperamental. As a result, she missed out on several roles, including the female lead in the Edward G. Robinson gangster film The Last Gangster (1937), losing out to another Viennese actress, Rose Stradner. Speaking of Mayer decades later, Rainer recalled, "He said, 'We made you and we are going to destroy you.' Well, he tried his best."

=== Departure from Hollywood ===
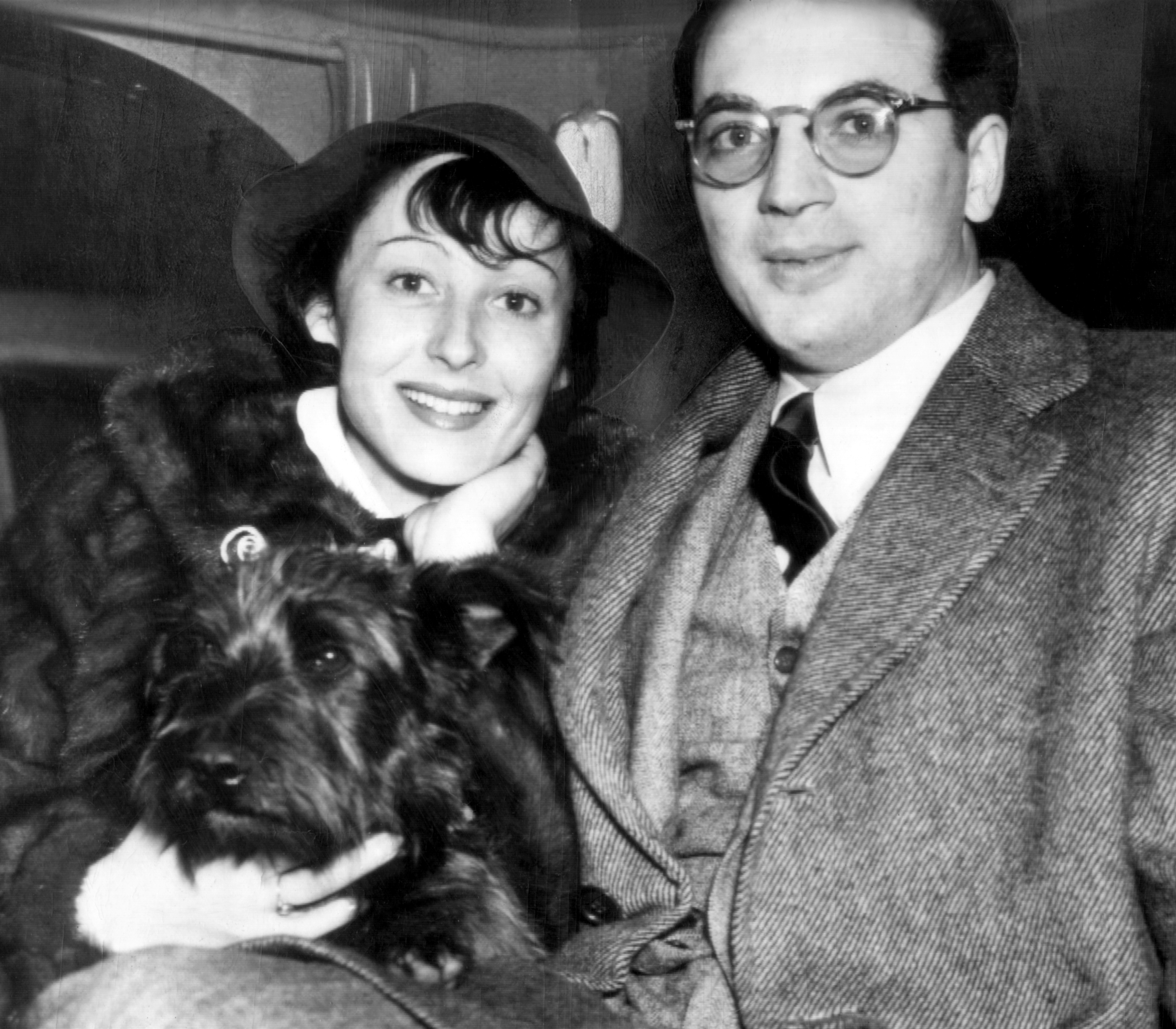
Luise Rainer and Clifford Odets in January 1937, shortly before their marriage

Rainer made her final film appearance for MGM in 1938 and abandoned the film industry. In a 1983 interview, the actress told how she went to Louis B. Mayer's office and said to him: "Mr Mayer, I must stop making films. My source has dried up. I work from the inside out, and there is nothing inside to give." Following this altercation, she traveled to Europe, where she helped get aid to children who were victims of the Spanish Civil War. Nevertheless, she was not released from her contract and, by 1940, she was still bound to make one more film for the studio.

Disenchanted with Hollywood, where she later said it was impossible to have an intellectual conversation, she moved to New York City in 1940 to live with playwright Clifford Odets, whom she had married in 1937. Rainer had never made it a secret that she felt terrible as Odets' wife, and exclaimed in a 1938 interview: "All the acting I've done on the stage or screen has been nothing compared to the acting I did in New York, when I tried to make everyone think I was happy – and my heart was breaking." She filed for divorce in mid-1938, but proceedings were delayed "to next October" when Odets went to England. The divorce was final on 14 May 1940. Rainer and Odets summered at Pine Brook Country Club in Nichols, Connecticut, where numerous other members of the Group Theatre (New York) also spent the summer of 1936, both acting and writing.

Despite the negativity, Rainer was one of the actresses considered for the role of Scarlett O'Hara in Gone With the Wind (1939), but the idea was not well-received, and she was not given a screen test. She also was unable to persuade MGM bosses to cast her in Johnny Belinda, based on a 1940 play about a deaf-mute rape victim.

In a later interview, Rainer commented about her disappearance from the movie industry:

I was very young. There were a lot of things I was unprepared for. I was too honest, I talked serious instead of with my eyelashes and Hollywood thought I was cuckoo. I worked in seven big pictures in three years. I have to be inspired to give a good performance. I complained to a studio executive that the source was dried up. The executive told me, 'Why worry about the source. Let the director worry about that.' I didn't run away from anybody in Hollywood. I ran away from myself.

== Later life and career ==
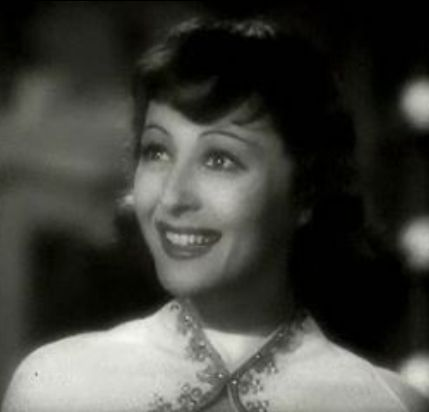
1938 publicity photo

While in Europe, Rainer studied medicine and explained she loved being accepted as "just another student", rather than as a screen actress. She returned to the stage and made her first appearance at the Palace Theatre, Manchester, on 1 May 1939 as Françoise in Jacques Deval's play Behold the Bride; she played the same part in her London debut at the Shaftesbury Theatre on 23 May. Returning to America, she played the lead in George Bernard Shaw's Saint Joan on 10 March 1940 at the Belasco Theatre in Washington, D.C. under the direction of German emigrant director Erwin Piscator. She made her first appearance on the New York stage at the Music Box Theatre in May 1942 as Miss Thing in J. M. Barrie's A Kiss for Cinderella.

She made an appearance in Hostages in 1943 and abandoned film making in 1944 after marrying publisher Robert Knittel. She initially did not plan on returning to the screen, but explained her comeback in 1943 by saying:

All the professor and the other students cared about was whether I could answer the questions, not whether I could come to class looking glamorous. But after that brief return to the stage, I began to realize that all the doors which had been opened to me in Europe, and all the work I had been able to accomplish for refugee children, was due to the fact that people knew me from my screen work. I began to feel a sense of responsibility to a job which I had started and never finished. When I also felt, after that experience at Dennis, that perhaps I did have talent after all, and that my too-sudden stardom was not just a matter of happy accident, I decided to go back.

When Rainer returned to Hollywood, her contract at MGM had long expired and she had no agent. David Rose, head of Paramount Pictures, offered her a starring role in an English film shot on location, but war conditions prevented her from accepting the role. Instead, Rose suggested in 1942 that she make a screen test for the lead role in For Whom the Bell Tolls (1943), but Ingrid Bergman was cast. Rainer eventually settled on a role in Hostages (1943) and told the press about the role: "It's certainly not an Academy Award part, and thank goodness, my bosses don't expect me to win an award with it. ... No, this is something unspectacular but I hope, a step back in the right direction."

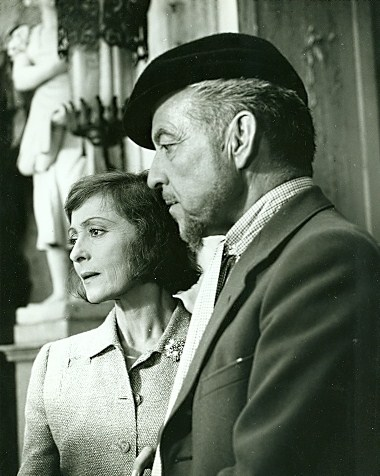
Rainer in the TV series Combat!, episode "Finest Hour" (1965), publicity still

Rainer took her oath of allegiance to the United States in the 1940s, but she and Knittel lived in the UK and Switzerland for most of their marriage. Robert Knittel died in 1989. The couple had one daughter, Francesca Knittel, now known as Francesca Knittel-Bowyer. Rainer had two granddaughters, Luisa and Nicole, and two great-grandchildren, Luca and Hunter.

Federico Fellini enticed her to play the cameo role of Dolores in his 1960 Oscar-winning classic La Dolce Vita, to the point of her travelling to the Rome location, but she quit the production prior to shooting, a fact that has been attributed either to her resistance to an unwanted sex scene or to her insistence on overseeing her own dialogue. The role was later cut from the eventual screenplay. She made sporadic television and stage appearances following her and her husband's move to Britain, appearing in an episode of the World War II television series Combat! in 1965. She took a dual role in a 1984 episode of The Love Boat. For the latter, she received a standing ovation from the crew. She appeared in The Gambler (1997) in a small role, marking her film comeback at the age of 86. She made appearances at the 1998 and 2003 Academy Awards ceremonies as part of special retrospective tributes to past Oscar winners.

On 12 January 2010, Rainer celebrated her centenary in London. Actor Sir Ian McKellen was one of her guests. During that month, she was present at the British Film Institute tribute to her at the National Film Theatre, where she was interviewed by Richard Stirling before screenings of The Good Earth and The Great Waltz. She also appeared onstage at the National Theatre, where she was interviewed by Sir Christopher Frayling. In April 2010, she returned to Hollywood to present a TCM festival screening of The Good Earth, accompanied by an interview with host Robert Osborne.

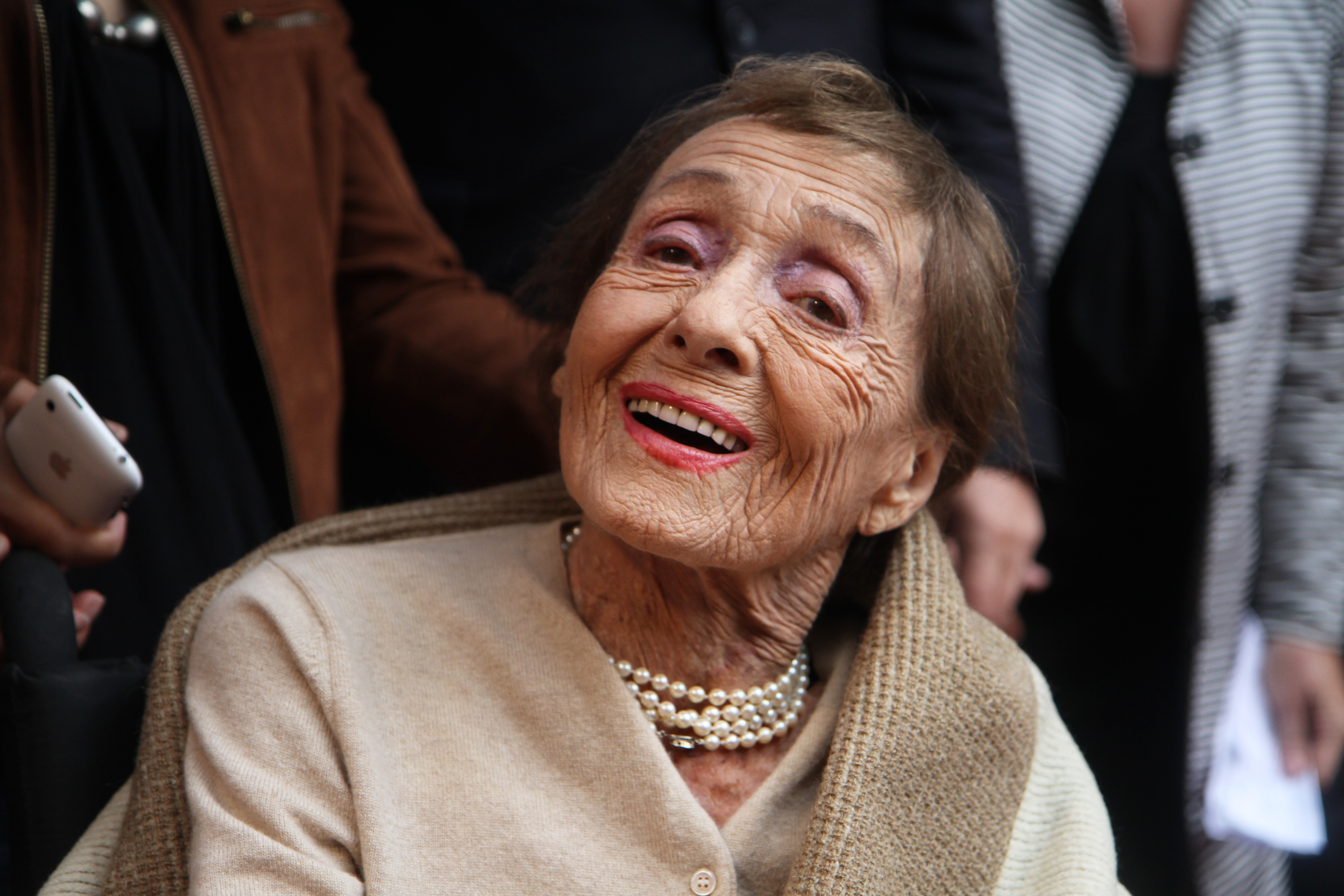
Rainer in September 2011 receiving a star on the Boulevard der Stars

Rainer has a star on the Hollywood Walk of Fame at 6300 Hollywood Boulevard.

On 5 September 2011, then 101-year-old Rainer travelled to Berlin to receive a star on the Boulevard der Stars. Her star was among the 21 stars issued in 2011 and followed the 20 that were issued in 2010. The star was issued as an exception and was not without controversy. Rainer had been forgotten when the Boulevard der Stars opened in 2010, despite being Germany's only Academy Award-winning actress. In 2011, she was initially rejected by the jury (Senta Berger, Gero Gandert, Uwe Kammann, Dieter Kosslick and Hans Helmut Prinzler) despite being nominated. A prolonged campaign started in October 2010, led by music executive Paul Baylay, who had noticed Rainer's omission on the Boulevard. Baylay campaigned in Germany, lobbying press and politicians to support the campaign to have the actress and her work recognised. The campaign was supported by the Central Council of Jews. In August 2011, the Boulevard der Stars finally relented, acknowledging the Facebook, email, and letter campaign led by Baylay had been key in their decision to awarding an extra star to Rainer.

== Death ==
Rainer died at her London home on 30 December 2014 at the age of 104 from pneumonia. She was 13 days shy of her 105th birthday. Rainer spent her final years living in a flat formerly occupied by actress Vivien Leigh at 54 Eaton Square, Belgravia, London. Her memorabilia were auctioned in 2015. The auction netted US$489,069 for her heirs.

== Acting style ==
Rainer is best known for winning back-to-back Academy Awards, although she received criticism for being, in the words of Roger Ebert, "an excessive actress, larger than life, probably more suited to the Viennese and German stage of her youth than anywhere else."

== Filmography ==
Film work by Luise Rainer
Year	Title	Role	Notes
1932	Sehnsucht 202	Kitty	
1932	Madame hat Besuch		
1933	Today Is the Day	Marita Costa	
1935	Escapade	Leopoldine Dur	
1936	The Great Ziegfeld	Anna Held	Academy Award for Best Actress; New York Film Critics Circle Award for Best Actress
1937	The Good Earth	O-Lan	Academy Award for Best Actress
1937	The Emperor's Candlesticks	Countess Olga Mironova	
1937	Big City	Anna Benton	
1938	The Toy Wife	Gilberte 'Frou Frou' Brigard	
1938	The Great Waltz	Poldi Vogelhuber	
1938	Dramatic School	Louise Mauban	
1943	Hostages	Milada Pressinger	
1997	The Gambler	Grandmother	
2003	Poem – Ich setzte den Fuß in die Luft und sie trug	Herself	(final film role)

Television work by Luise Rainer
Year	Title	Role	Notes
1949	The Chevrolet Tele-Theatre		Episode: "Trapeze"
1950–1953	Lux Video Theatre	Caroline / Mrs. Page	2 episodes
1950–1957	BBC Sunday Night Theatre	Ingra Arlberg / Nina	2 episodes
1951	Schlitz Playhouse of Stars	Chambermaid	Episode: "Love Came Late"
1951	Faith Baldwin Romance Theatre		Episode: "Women Overboard"
1954	Suspense		Episode: "Torment"
1963	Die kleinen Füchse	Birdie Hubbard	TV movie
1965	Combat!	Countess De Roy	Episode: "Finest Hour"
1984	The Love Boat	Twin sisters Dorothy Fielding / Maggie Koerner	1 episode
1991	A Dancer	Anna	TV movie

== See also ==
- List of Academy Award records
- List of German-speaking Academy Award winners and nominees
- List of actors with Academy Award nominations
