= Hostages (1943 film) =

1943 film by Frank Tuttle

- theatrical poster
- Directed by: Frank Tuttle
- Screenplay by: Frank Butler; Lester Cole
- Based on: Hostages; 1942 novel by Stefan Heym
- Produced by: Sol C. Siegel
- Starring: Luise Rainer; Arturo de Córdova; William Bendix; Paul Lukas
- Cinematography: Victor Milner
- Edited by: Archie Marshek
- Music by: Victor Young
- Production company: Paramount Pictures
- Distributed by: Paramount Pictures
- Release dates: August 12, 1943 (United States); October 11, 1943 (New York City)
- Running time: 88 minutes
- Country: United States
- Language: English

Hostages is an American war film produced by Paramount Pictures and released in 1943. It was directed by Frank Tuttle from a script by Frank Butler and Lester Cole based on the 1942 novel of the same name by Stefan Heym. The film stars Luise Rainer, Arturo de Córdova, William Bendix and Paul Lukas and features Katina Paxinou and Oskar Homolka.

== Plot ==
A group of 26 Czechoslovak citizens are jailed as hostages by the Gestapo until the supposed killer of a Nazi officer – who actually committed suicide – is turned in. The hostages include the leader of the underground resistance movement (William Bendix), whose cover is that of an apparently ignorant washroom attendant in the nightclub where the victim was last seen alive.

== Cast ==
- Luise Rainer as Milada Pressinger
- Arturo de Córdova as Paul Breda
- William Bendix as Underground leader
- Paul Lukas as Rheinhardt
- Katina Paxinou as Maria
- Oskar Homolka as Lev Pressinger
- Reinhold Schünzel as Kurt Daluege
- Frederick Gierrman as Captain Patzer
- Roland Varno as Jan Pavel
- Felix Basch as Dr. Wallerstein
- John Mylong as Proskosch
- Hans Conried as Lt. Glasenapp
- Steven Geray as Mueller

== Production ==
Hostages used footage of Prague which was originally shot six years before for the film Bluebeard's Eighth Wife. Erich von Stroheim was originally scheduled to play the part of "Rheinhardt", but had to withdraw in order to film Paramount's Five Graves to Cairo.
