= Aarno Maliniemi =

Finnish historian (1892–1972)

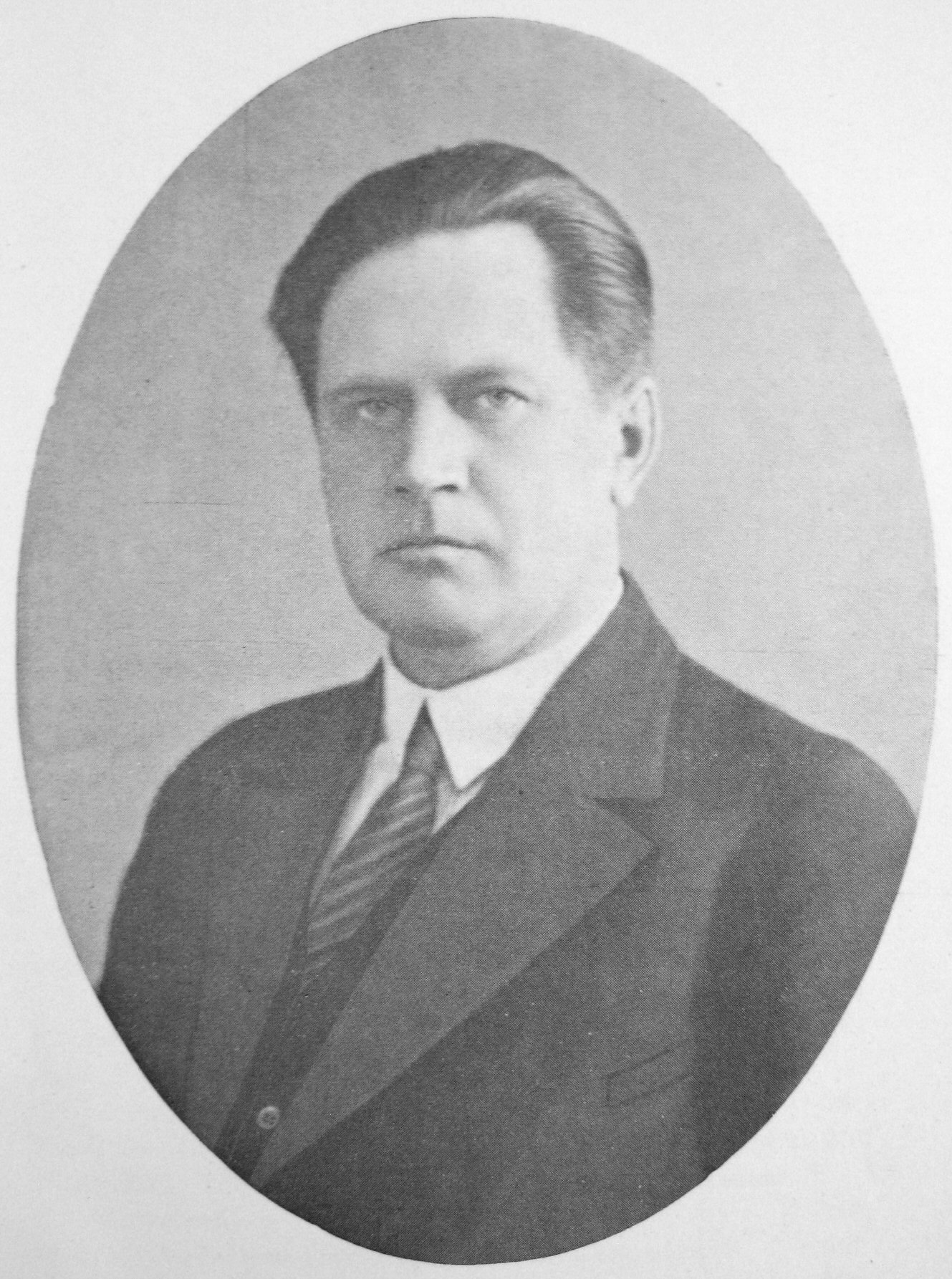
Aarno Maliniemi.

Aarno Henrik Maliniemi (surname until 1930 Malin; 9 May 1892 – 8 October 1972) was a Finnish historian, professor in church history at Helsinki University 1945–1960.

Maliniemi was an expert on the medieval church. He studied early Finnish literature, and was editor of a number of publications and bibliographies.

Maliniemi was born in Oulu. He was awarded a doctor honoris causa by University of Uppsala in 1952 and by University of St Andrews in 1960. He died in Helsinki, aged 80.

== Bibliography ==
- Der Heiligenkalender Finnlands (1925)
- Studier i Vadstena klosters bibliotek (1926)
- S.G. Elmgrenin muistiinpanot (1939)
- De Sancto Henrico (1942)
- Birgittalaisuudesta sekä kohtia Naantalin luostarin historiasta (1943)
- Zur Kenntnis des Breviarium Aboense (1957)
