= Sons (novel) =

1932 novel by Pearl S. Buck

- First edition
- Author: Pearl S. Buck
- Language: English
- Series: The House of Earth trilogy
- Genre: Historical fiction
- Publisher: John Day Company
- Publication date: June 1932
- Publication place: United States
- Media type: Print (Hardback & Paperback)
- Preceded by: The Good Earth
- Followed by: A House Divided

Sons is a historical fiction novel by American author Pearl S. Buck first published by John Day Company in 1932. It is the second book in The House of Earth trilogy, preceded by The Good Earth and followed by A House Divided.

The story tackles the issue of Wang Lung's sons and how they handle their father's estate after his death. It deals mostly with the youngest son, who goes off to war in The Good Earth, and his son.

Buck claimed that after completing The Good Earth "I found my mind so filled and absorbed with Wang Lung's family that I felt quite compelled to go on with them."

== Plot ==
As Wang Lung lies near death, his family prepares for his funeral, including the first two of his three sons. They send for their brother and are surprised to see him leading a band of soldiers into the town. After he left home near the end of The Good Earth, he joined the army of a warlord and quickly rose in the ranks. Once Wang Lung is dead and buried and his land divided among the sons, they find themselves drawn together in unusual ways even as they drift apart.

Wang the Third (most often called “The Tiger” or "Wang the Tiger") demands that his brothers (Wang the Eldest, also called “Wang the Landlord,” and Wang the Second, also called “Wang the Merchant”) sell his share and give him his inheritance in silver, and also asks to borrow as much money as they can lend him. He needs the funds in order to break away from the warlord and set himself up with an army of his own. Since he has no sons, he asks his brothers to send him some of theirs, receiving one from each of them. Wang the Merchant's smallpox-scarred oldest son quickly proves himself a useful aide, but Wang the Landlord's dainty second son hates life as a soldier and hangs himself during a visit to the family home. As time passes, Wang the Landlord is forced to sell much of his share of the land in order to support his family's lavish lifestyle, with the Merchant buying the best tracts for himself.

Wang the Tiger leads his men north, into the territory of a cruel warlord known as the Leopard, and kills him with the help of a trap prepared by the county magistrate. His men take over the Leopard's large army, which begins to collect taxes from the local population. The Tiger also captures a hostile young woman who had been the Leopard's consort and imprisons her for a time, then releases her after putting an end to the corruption in the magistrate's courts. He is surprised when she – now greatly calmed – decides to remain with him and become his wife.

At the same time, power struggles have begun to grow between the Chinese ruler and local warlords, some of whom want to depose him. The Tiger calls on Wang the Merchant to smuggle guns into the country for his growing army, but his wife tries to divert them to a band of robbers, for which he kills her. He later takes two new wives and leads his forces southeast to lay siege to the capital of a coastal territory and unseat its warlord. Upon returning to his first stronghold, he discovers that his wives have given birth to his first two children, a son and a daughter.

The death of old Lotus, the concubine Wang Lung took decades ago, coupled with Wang the Tiger's disgust at his brothers and their sons, prompts him to try to do better with his own son. The Tiger begins to introduce him to military life with the goal of eventually putting him in command of the army, but the boy shows more interest in farming as Wang Lung did. Upon learning that one of his top aides is plotting to rebel against him, the Tiger storms the coastal capital to kill him, but the man commits suicide first.

A severe famine strikes much of the countryside, and the Tiger is forced to deal harshly with his hungry men and turn to his brothers for help. At this time, Wang Lung's mentally disabled daughter (the “Poor Fool”) dies, further fueling the Tiger's son's interest in the land on which she had lived. The rift between the two grows when the boy turns fifteen and his father sends him to a military school; four years later, the Tiger is shocked to see him wearing the uniform of an army that is fighting a revolution against the government and the warlords. However, the young man does not intend to battle his father as an enemy, but rather to hide among the rural farmers until the upheaval has ended. The Tiger is left to reconcile himself to the fact that both his life and his son's have turned out far differently than he had planned.

== Themes ==
Salt Lake City Tribune reviewer E. E. Hollis states the theme of Sons to be "how with these great families, risen from the soil, the process of decay set in within an early generation." Birmingham News reviewer Dorothy Herzfeld felt the main theme to be "that when the farmer leaves his true habitat, the soil, he degrades himself morally and spiritually." According to Herzfeld, another theme shows "China's government in all its chaos of petty warlords who act under the state's seal and ostensibly for the state's good – after forcing town magistrates to hire them." Herzfeld felt that although with this "Mrs. Buck has undertaken a greater task than she dealt with in The Good Earth", Sons "lacks the universal appeal of The Good Earth" because its theme is strictly Chinese, as "nowhere else does such government uncertainty exist."

== Reception ==
New York Times reviewer J. Donald Adams called Sons a "vivid chronicle of revolutionary China." Hollis said that Sons proves Buck's "ability to tell a story vividly" although it "is not so profoundly moving a story as [The Good Earth]." Chattanooga Daily Times reviewer Gilbert E. Govan called it "an almost equal triumph" to The Good Earth. Courier-Journal critic Anna Blanche McGill described it as a "good, if not magical piece of workmanship" that does a "studious, painstaking job of observing and recording, if not a masterpiece of creative imagination." McGill said that Sons evokes less emotion than The Good Earth but she praises its "beautiful, Biblical prose." Pittsburgh Press critic Ruth Ayers praised the writing and descriptions as being equal to The Good Earth and said that one climax after another is reached only to be climaxed again by greater events." Ida Gilbert Myers of Evening Star concluded her review of Sons by saying that "Pearl Buck comes bringing gifts, the supreme gift of transferring living facts to pages that are themselves compact of life itself." The Honolulu Advertiser called Sons "a powerful novel, of a powerful people" and said that "Mrs. Buck knows the strength of few words to make her meaning clear." Detroit Free Press felt Sons was a "worthy successor" to The Good Earth but detected some "dragginess" in it. Chinese Marxist critic Ch'ao-ting Chi considered Sons to be a fine novel and "a not unworthy successor to The Good Earth." Chi said that the characters "appear so real to me that I cannot resist the temptation to search for their prototypes among my acquaintances at home" but criticized Buck's lack of understanding of the Chinese land system or of the way that in Chi's opinion usury oppressed Chinese peasants.
