= A House Divided (novel) =

1935 historical fiction novel by Pearl S. Buck

- First edition cover
- Author: Pearl S. Buck
- Language: English
- Series: House of Earth
- Genre: Family Saga
- Publisher: John Day Company
- Publication date: 1935
- Publication place: United States
- Media type: Print (Hardcover)
- Pages: 353
- Preceded by: Sons

A House Divided is a historical fiction novel by American author Pearl S. Buck first published by John Day Company in 1935. The story centers on the third generation of Wang Lung's family, focusing particularly on his grandson Wang Yuan. It is the third and final book in The House of Earth trilogy, preceded by Sons.

== Writing ==
Buck began the writing of A House Divided while living in Ithaca, New York shortly after the publication of Sons in 1932. The novel originally had the working title of The Patriot.

== Plot ==
Shortly after the confrontation between Wang the Tiger and his son Wang Yuan at the end of Sons, Yuan travels to the old earthen house where his grandfather Wang Lung had lived. He intends merely to hide here for a while and wait out the revolution in which he had been fighting. However, the local farmers believe that he will bring trouble from either his father or his uncles, whose high rents leave them in near-poverty.

Yuan’s mother persuades him to return home with a claim that the Tiger is deathly ill; in reality, this is a plot to lead him into marriage. He flees to a coastal city where his sister Ai-lan – now a young woman who has thrown off traditional Chinese customs – is living with her mother, who asks Yuan to consider her his foster mother. Here he befriends two of his cousins, the aspiring poet Sheng and the activist Meng, and starts to keep watch on Ai-lan since his foster mother worries that her carefree lifestyle may lead her into trouble.

Yuan enrolls at a school in the city and soon discovers that many of its students are activists like Meng, who tries to recruit him to the same revolutionary cause that he fled earlier. The following spring, he takes an agriculture class, for which he has to tend a plot of land in the countryside. Here he gets his first real taste of farm life, trading knowledge and tips with a farmer to the benefit of both. As the term continues, he becomes attracted to a female student, one of the activists, and struggles to reconcile these feelings with his strict upbringing at the Tiger’s hands.

The Tiger’s determination to have Yuan married drives him to rejoin the revolution. As his relationship with the female activist deteriorates due to her jealousy, the uprising spreads through China and the government begins to crack down in every city. When she is caught, she readily betrays Yuan, leading to his arrest as Meng flees for his life. After three days in custody, he is released thanks to large bribes paid by his family; he and Sheng then travel by ship to the West Coast of the United States, having received word from Meng that he is safe.

Yuan spends the next six years in America, throwing himself into his studies to earn an agriculture degree from a prestigious college. Almost as soon as he arrives, he is struck by the differences between Americans and Chinese people, especially in their attitudes toward the land on which they live. Scattered instances of racism, prejudice, and class discrimination combine with Yuan’s pride in his heritage to breed within him a subtle hatred of American culture.

One of his teachers, Dr. Henry Wilson, befriends Yuan and introduces him to his wife and his daughter Mary. The elder Wilsons try to convert him to Christianity, unsettling him greatly, but he finds common ground with Mary, who respects her parents’ faith even though she does not share it. Their relationship grows closer for a time, but falls apart when Mary kisses Yuan, whose pride will not allow him to tolerate physical relations between Chinese and non-Chinese. Soon afterward, he receives news that the revolution in his country has started to claim innocent victims, and he sets out for home once he has completed his degree.

Upon his return, Yuan finds that six years have greatly changed both the country and his family. Ai-lan is about to marry a divorced man whose baby she is carrying, while Meng has become a captain in the revolutionary forces. While traveling by train to visit the Tiger, he is revolted by the squalor that still persists in poor and rural areas. The meeting itself delivers a new shock: the Tiger financed his release from jail and his studies abroad with large sums borrowed from Wang the Merchant, Yuan’s younger uncle, and has little hope of paying him back. Yuan is expected to find a good job for himself and the Merchant’s sons and repay the debt from his wages, but he rebels at the idea even as part of his nature accepts this duty to the older generation.

Mei-ling, a foundling girl taken in by Yuan’s foster mother years ago, has grown into a beautiful young woman and is studying medicine. She turns down his offer of marriage, explaining her determination to become a doctor; this rejection prompts him to move to the country’s new capital and become a schoolteacher. However, the school building is falling apart and Yuan is poorly paid, making it difficult for him to work off his father’s debt. In addition, Meng brings news that some of his colleagues are planning to rebel against their commanders and start a new revolution, one that will truly sweep away the distinctions between rich and poor.

Yuan visits the family for the New Year celebration, during which Sheng returns from America and Ai-lan delivers a son. During the festivities, Mei-ling sees him carousing as Sheng often does and berates him sharply, saying that he has become as decadent as the idle rich before the revolution came. Not long after the holiday, the Merchant’s son comes to Yuan badly injured and bearing terrible news: robbers and peasants have banded together, tortured the Tiger, and looted the great town house that Wang Lung bought when he became rich.

Yuan travels to Wang Lung’s earthen house, where he finds the Tiger slowly dying from his wounds. Mei-ling soon arrives, accompanied by Yuan’s foster mother, to make the old man as comfortable as possible in his final hours. Yuan and Mei-ling reconcile, share a kiss, and realize that they are free to follow ancient traditions or foreign customs as they see fit. As they stand at the doorway of the house, Yuan in the same kind of coarse blue cotton clothing his grandfather always wore, he muses, "We two—we two—we need not be afraid of anything."

== Reception ==
The Courier-Journal felt that, like Sons, A House Divided lacks the unity of The Good Earth, but although it is not "marvelous" it is "sound stuff." The Fresno Bee felt that "in many ways it is a better book than the other two of the trilogy" and that Wang Yuan is "perhaps, the most fully realized figure Mrs. Buck has created" and "symbolic of the youth of China striving to find itself in the press of new ideas."
