= Belforêt-en-Perche =

- Commune
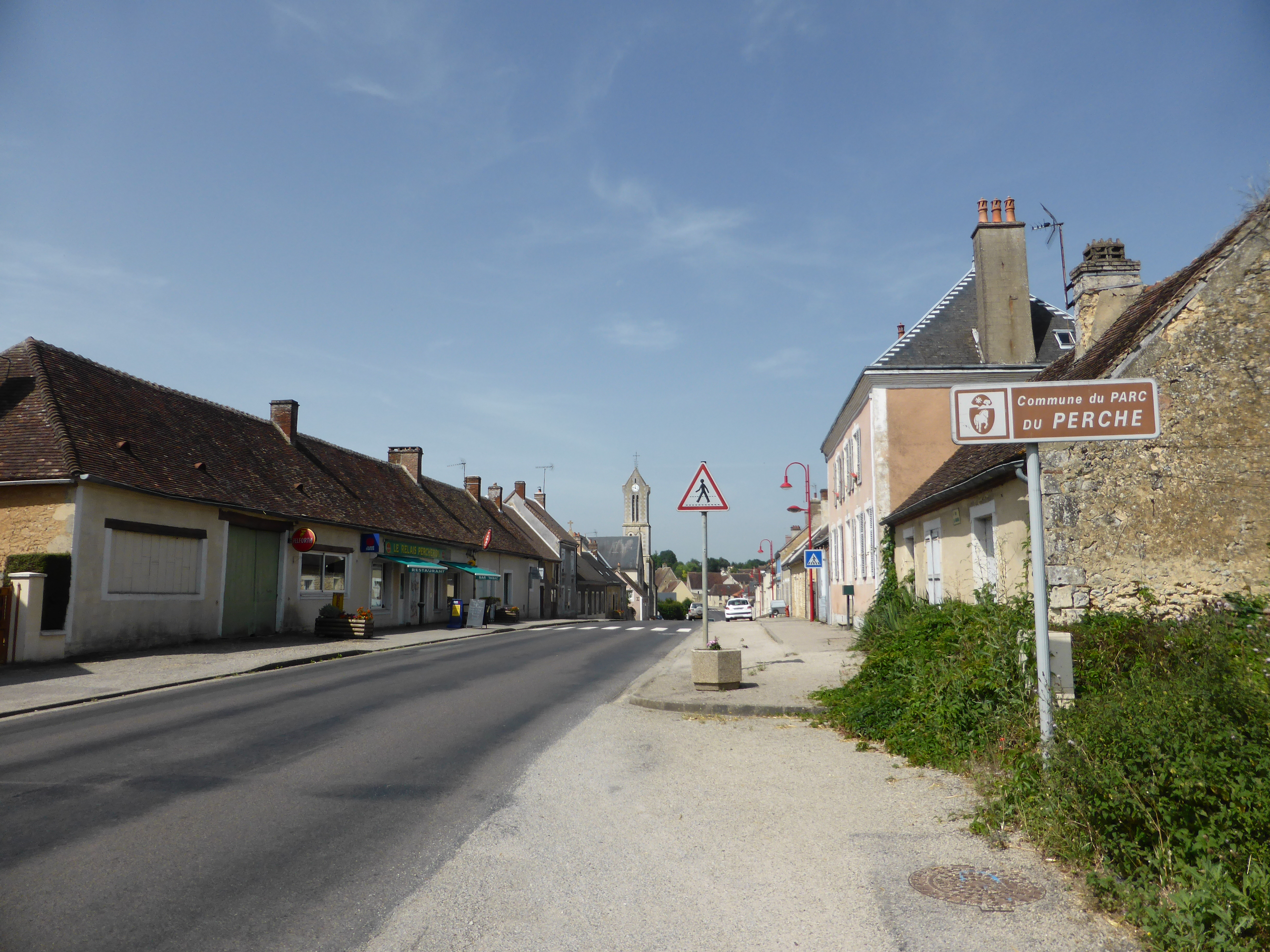
- A road in Le Gué-de-la-Chaîne
- Location of Belforêt-en-Perche
- Location within France Location within Normandy
- Coordinates: 48°22′30″N 0°31′23″E
- Country: France
- Region: Normandy
- Department: Orne
- Arrondissement: Mortagne-au-Perche
- Canton: Ceton
- Intercommunality: Collines du Perche normand

Government
  - Mayor (2020–2026): David Boulay
- Area^{1}: 74.53 km^{2} (28.78 sq mi)
- Population (2023): 1,474
  - Density: 19.78/km^{2} (51.22/sq mi)
- Time zone: UTC+01:00 (CET)
  - Summer (DST): UTC+02:00 (CEST)
- INSEE/Postal code: 61196 /61130
- ^{1} French Land Register data, which excludes lakes, ponds, glaciers > 1 km^{2} (0.386 sq mi or 247 acres) and river estuaries.

Belforêt-en-Perche (French pronunciation: [bɛlfɔʁɛ ɑ̃ pɛʁʃ], literally Belforêt in Perche) is a commune in the department of Orne, northwestern France. The municipality was established on 1 January 2017 by merger of the former communes of Le Gué-de-la-Chaîne (the seat), Eperrais, Origny-le-Butin, La Perrière, Saint-Ouen-de-la-Cour and Sérigny. La Perrière is classed as a Petites Cités de Caractère.

== Geography ==
The commune is made up of the following collection of villages and hamlets, Eperrais, Saint-Ouen-de-la-Cour, Les Saint-Hilaire, Bouvigny, Belforêt-en-Perche, Le Bois Fezedin, Sérigny, Origny-le-Butin and La Trouverie.

Belforêt-en-Perche along with the communes of Vaunoise, Saint-Martin-du-Vieux-Bellême, Igé and Appenai-sous-Bellême is part of the Bois et coteaux calcaires sous Belleme a Natura 2000 conservation site. The site measures 105 hectares and is home to the European stag beetle and European ash.

The Commune along with another 70 communes also shares part of another Natura 2000 conservation area, called the Forêts et étangs du Perche.

The source of the river Huisne is within the commune. In addition there are three other rivers the L'Orne Saosnoise, Le Chêne Galon and La Même. As well as rivers there are three streams the Ruisseau du plessis, Ruisseau de dame-marie and the ruisseau de chêne galon that also flow through the commune.

== points of Interest ==
- Botanical Garden of Le Bois du Puits is a botanical garden that was made open to the public in 2012, featuring over 2,000 species of plants.
- La Perrière botanical garden is a 230 m2 botanical garden in La Perrière to highlight plants of the local area.

=== National heritage sites ===
The Commune has 6 buildings and areas listed as a Monument historique

- Former priory of Chènegallon a seventeenth century former priory in Eperrais.
- l'Evêque lodge a seventeenth century former lodge in La Perrière.
- Château de Morthimer a sixteenth century chateau in La Perrière.
- Château du Tertre a seventeenth century chateau in Sérigny, that from 1926 was home to Nobel prize winning novelist Roger Martin du Gard. The Chateau is listed as a Maisons des Illustres due to its Roger Martin du Gard collection. The grounds and Estate are shared with the neighbouring commune of Saint-Martin-du-Vieux-Bellême
- Manoir de Soisai a sixteenth century Manor house in La Perrière.
- Lods house a twentieth century house in Sérigny built by architect Marcel Lods.

== Notable people ==
- Corderius - (1479 or 1480 – 1564) a theologian, teacher, humanist, and pedagogian was born here in La Perrière.
- Roger Martin du Gard - (1881 – 1958) a French novelist, winner of the 1937 Nobel Prize in Literature died here in Sérigny.
- Jean Bouvier (1924 – 2022), a French painter, lived in Origny-le-Butin (now part of Belforêt-en-Perche) and painted many landscapes of the area.

== See also ==
- Communes of the Orne department
