= Butin =

Butin may refer to:

== Places ==
- Mount Butin in Iraqi Kurdistan
- Origny-le-Butin, a commune in the Orne department in northwestern France
- Butin, a village in Gătaia town, Timiș County, Romania

== Other uses ==
- Butin (surname)
- Butin (molecule), a flavanone

== See also ==
- Butyne, two chemical compounds
