= Saint-Martin-du-Vieux-Bellême =

- Commune
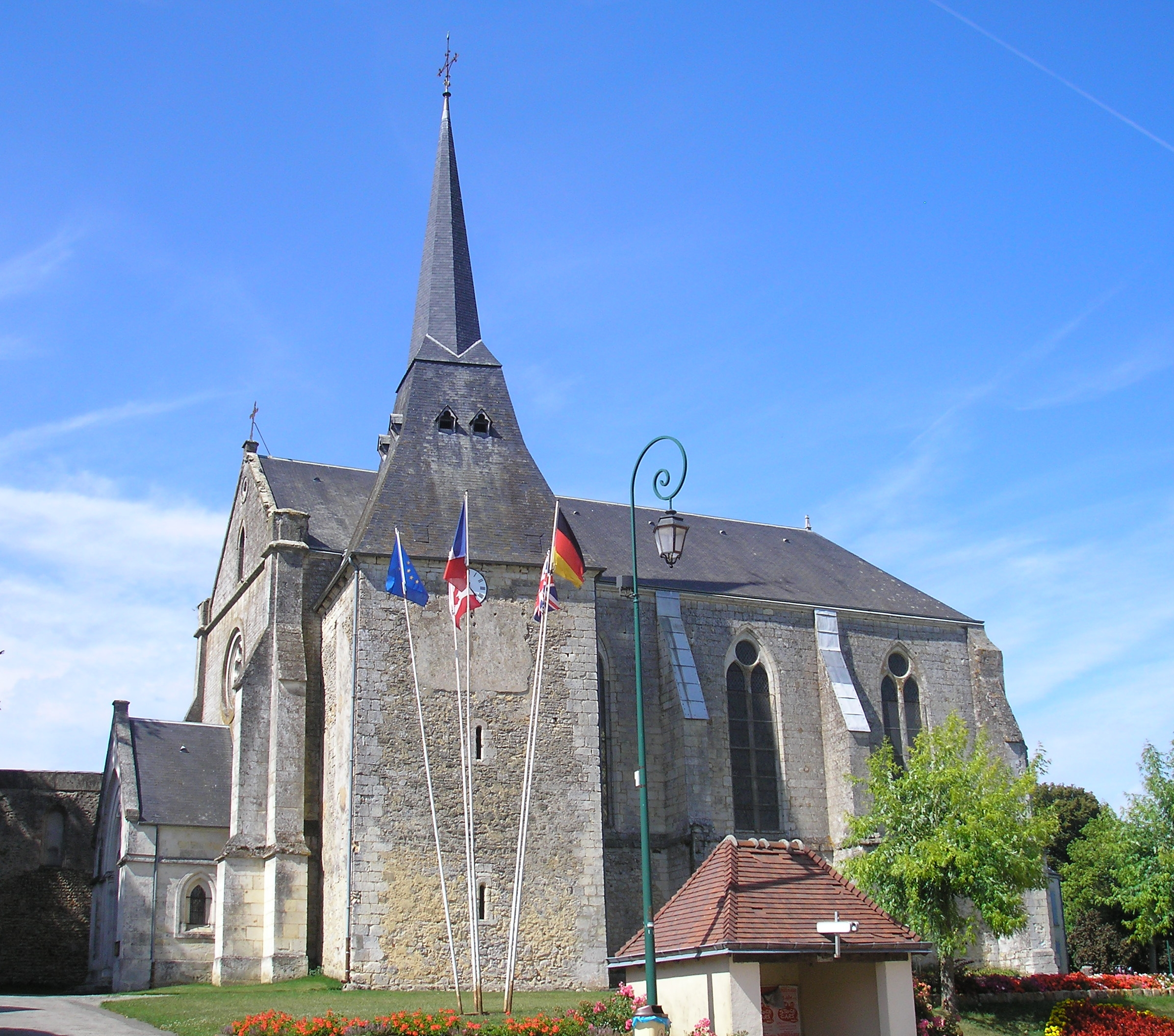
- The church in Saint-Martin-du-Vieux-Bellême
- Location of Saint-Martin-du-Vieux-Bellême
- Location within France Location within Normandy
- Coordinates: 48°22′56″N 0°32′37″E
- Country: France
- Region: Normandy
- Department: Orne
- Arrondissement: Mortagne-au-Perche
- Canton: Ceton

Government
  - Mayor (2020–2026): Serge Cailly
- Area^{1}: 15.84 km^{2} (6.12 sq mi)
- Elevation: 190 m (620 ft)
- Highest elevation: 244 m (801 ft)
- Lowest elevation: 122 m (400 ft)
- Population (2023): 538
  - Density: 34.0/km^{2} (88.0/sq mi)
- Time zone: UTC+01:00 (CET)
  - Summer (DST): UTC+02:00 (CEST)
- INSEE/Postal code: 61426 /61130
- ^{1} French Land Register data, which excludes lakes, ponds, glaciers > 1 km^{2} (0.386 sq mi or 247 acres) and river estuaries.

Saint-Martin-du-Vieux-Bellême (French pronunciation: [sɛ̃ maʁtɛ̃ dy vjø bɛlɛm]) is a commune in the Orne department in north-western France.

== Geography ==
Saint-Martin-du-Vieux-Bellême along with the communes of Vaunoise, Belforêt-en-Perche, Igé and Appenai-sous-Bellême is part of the Bois et coteaux calcaires sous Belleme a Natura 2000 conservation site. The site measures 105 hectares and is home to the European stag beetle and European ash.

In addition the Commune along with another 70 communes shares part of a 47,681 hectare, Natura 2000 conservation area, called the Forêts et étangs du Perche.

A river la Même, runs through the commune.

== Points of interest ==
- La réserve des Houles-Blanches is a 6950 m2 is a local nature reserve, created in 1992 under the Natura 2000 scheme, and is part of the wider site of Bois et coteaux calcaires sous Belleme. The reserve is home to variopus flora and fauna such as the Brown hairstreak, European tree frog and Hazel dormouse.

=== National heritage sites ===
- Château du Tertre a seventeenth Century chateau in Sérigny, that from 1926 was home to Nobel prize winning novelist Roger Martin du Gard. The grounds and Estate are in this commune and neighbouring commune of Belforêt-en-Perche

== Sport ==
The commune has an 18-hole golf course, Golf de Bellême.

== See also ==
- Communes of the Orne department
