= Corderius =

French theologian (died 1564)

- Born: Mathurin Cordier; 1479 or 1480; La Perrière, Normandy, France
- Died: September 8, 1564 (aged 84–85); Geneva
- Occupations: Theologian, teacher, humanist, pedagogian

Corderius (Latinized form of the name Mathurin Cordier; 1479 or 1480 – 8 September 1564) was a French-born theologian, teacher, humanist, and pedagogian active in Geneva, Republic of Geneva. He taught at the School of Lausanne (now the University of Lausanne), where he was a director.

== Studies ==
Cordier was born to a peasant family in La Perrière, Normandy. He completed his theological studies at Paris. Once he was a priest he exercised his ministry at a parish of Ruan and continued his studies, especially focused on grammar.

== Teaching at France ==
He gave up his priestly functions near 1540 when Paris, having heard of his competence, called him for teaching grammar in diverse locations. In 1523, Cordier was admitted to the College of la Marche as the Chair of Rhetoric. He taught John Calvin, and Calvin dedicated his Commentaries on the Epistle to the Thessalonians to him. In 1528 Cordier took charge of the Grammar School of Navarre. He taught in various locations in France, never stopping at any city for a long time.

While he was directing the School at Nevers, he came back to Paris where he met Robert Estienne. Estienne was a lexicographer and Protestant printer, who edited the works of Mathurin Cordier and convinced him to convert to Protestantism. He married Thomasse Pelet, and they had a daughter named Suzanne.

== Exile in Geneva and Neuchâtel ==
Denounced for his ideas, Corderius fled France in 1536 or 1537 and took refuge in the Republic of Geneva. There he taught alongside Calvin and William Farel. Corderius was in charge of a class in the School of de Rive. Over the next few years he saw rising hostility toward Protestants. He left the city and joined William Farel in Neuchâtel. Corderius was named as the director of the schools of the town.

== Teaching at Lausanne ==
In October 1545 the Vaud appointed Corderius as director the School of Lausanne. He held that position 1545 to 1547. At the same time, Corderius was a teacher and director at the "Twelve," a boarding school. The state paid for the living costs of the pupils, who were allowed to confess or go on with their ministries. The boarding school was suppressed in 1587, same year the Academy was inaugurated. The state granted Corderius a retirement pension in recognition of his 12 years of service. During this period Pierre Viret acted as Corderius' pastor.

Corderius was a 16th-century humanist, pedagogue, and grammarian known for his influential Latin textbooks and contributions to the teaching of Latin grammar, rhetoric, and classical literature.

== Return to Geneva and last years ==
In 1559, Corderius left the Vaud with Pierre Viret and Theodore Beza. They went to Geneva because of difficulties with the government of Bern. Once in Geneva, Corderius met John Calvin again. In 1562 the Geneva Council offered Corderius another teaching position, and he accepted. Thus Corderius spent the last period of life as he had twenty years before, teaching a class. He died on September 8 of 1564. Corderius was buried at the cemetery of Plainpalais, as he wished, near the presumed location of Calvin's tomb (Calvin did not want the location of his tomb to be known).

He possessed special tact and liking for teaching children, and wrote several books for them; the most famous is his Colloquia (Colloquiorum scholasticorum libri quatuor), which has passed through innumerable editions, and was used in schools for three centuries after his time. Cordier continued teaching at Bourdeaux and Paris.

He also wrote:

- Principia Latine loquendi scribendique, sive selecta quaedam ex Epistolis Ciceronis
- De Corrupti Sermonis apud Gallos Emendatione et Latine loquendi Ratione
- On the Corruption of Enmendation of the Word. This work had many French editions, some from the famous editor Rovillius among others. On the Spanish translations of this work, the scholar González Echeverría proved at ISHM that Michel de Villeneuve (better known as Michael Servetus) carried out this task in the edition of 1551, at the workshop of a friend, the printer Jean Frellon. These translations were anonymous, just like his Distichs of Cato. Michael de Villeneuve had to be careful, for Corderius and the printer Robert Estienne I (who printed many of Corderius' works) were very close to Calvin, and were also part of the Geneva Council.
- De Corrupti Sermonis apud Gallos Emendatione et Latine loquendi Ratione
- De Corrupti Sermonis Emendatione Libellus
- De syllabarum quantitate
- Conciones sacrae viginti rex Galliae
- Catonis disticha de moribus (with Latin and French translation)
- Remontrances et exhortations au roi et aux grands de son royaume
