= Igé, Orne =

Igé
- Commune
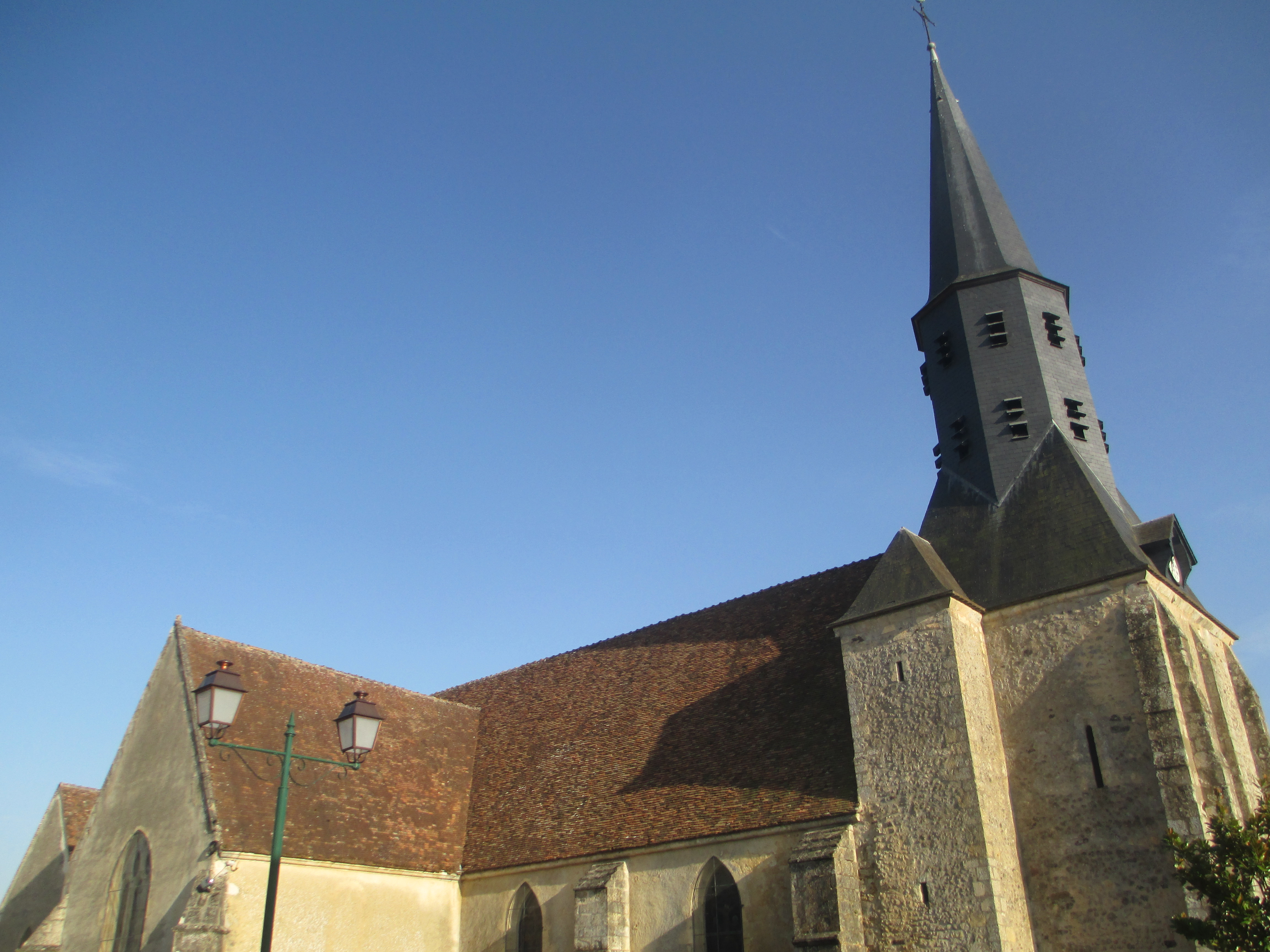
- The church in Igé
- Location of Igé
- Location within France Location within Normandy
- Coordinates: 48°19′31″N 0°31′20″E
- Country: France
- Region: Normandy
- Department: Orne
- Arrondissement: Mortagne-au-Perche
- Canton: Ceton
- Intercommunality: Collines du Perche Normand

Government
  - Mayor (2020–2026): Isabelle Thierry
- Area^{1}: 27.86 km^{2} (10.76 sq mi)
- Elevation: 128 m (420 ft)
- Highest elevation: 180 m (590 ft)
- Lowest elevation: 90 m (300 ft)
- Population (2023): 585
  - Density: 21.0/km^{2} (54.4/sq mi)
- Time zone: UTC+01:00 (CET)
  - Summer (DST): UTC+02:00 (CEST)
- INSEE/Postal code: 61207 /61130
- ^{1} French Land Register data, which excludes lakes, ponds, glaciers > 1 km^{2} (0.386 sq mi or 247 acres) and river estuaries.

Igé (French pronunciation: [iʒe]) is a commune in the Orne department in north-western France.

== Geography ==
Igé is made up of the following collection of villages and hamlets, La Butte des Rocs, Igé, La Maladrerie, La Drouinière, Le Ray, Laume, La Racicotière, Le Boulay and Marcilly.

Igé along with the communes of Vaunoise, Saint-Martin-du-Vieux-Bellême, Belforêt-en-Perche and Appenai-sous-Bellême is part of the Bois et coteaux calcaires sous Belleme a Natura 2000 conservation site. The site measures 105 hectares and is home to the European stag beetle and European ash.

A river, the Même, runs through the commune.

== Population ==
Historical population
Year	Pop.	±% p.a.
1968	890	—
1975	885	−0.08%
1982	804	−1.36%
1990	685	−1.98%
1999	702	+0.27%
2007	688	−0.25%
2012	674	−0.41%
2017	630	−1.34%
2023	585	−1.23%
Source: INSEE

== Points of interest ==
- Coteau de la Butte-des-Rocs is a 6.62 hectare site is a protected area created in 2012 as part of the Natura 2000 site Bois et coteaux calcaires sous Belleme. The site is home to the southern damselfly, Sand lizard, white horehound and the King trumpet mushroom.

=== National heritage sites ===
The Commune has four buildings and areas listed as a Monument historique.

- Domaine de Lonné seventeenth century chateau and estate that was registered as a monument in 2000.
- Church of Marcilly a twelfth century church, registered as a Monument historique in 1971.
- Bray Manor a seventeenth century Manor house, registered as a Monument historique in 1977.
- Garenne-de-la-Motte remains of a Motte from the Middle Ages, registered as a Monument historique in 1975.

== Notable people ==
- Albert de Balleroy a painter, etcher and parliamentarian was born here.

== See also ==
- Communes of the Orne department
