= La Perrière =

La Perrièremay refer to two communes of France:

- La Perrière, Orne, in the region of Basse-Normandie
- La Perrière, Savoie, in the region of Rhône-Alpes
- Ian Laperrière, Canadian ice hockey player and head coach of the Lehigh Valley Phantoms
- Guillaume de La Perrière (1499/1503 – 1565), French writer
