= Vaunoise =

- Commune
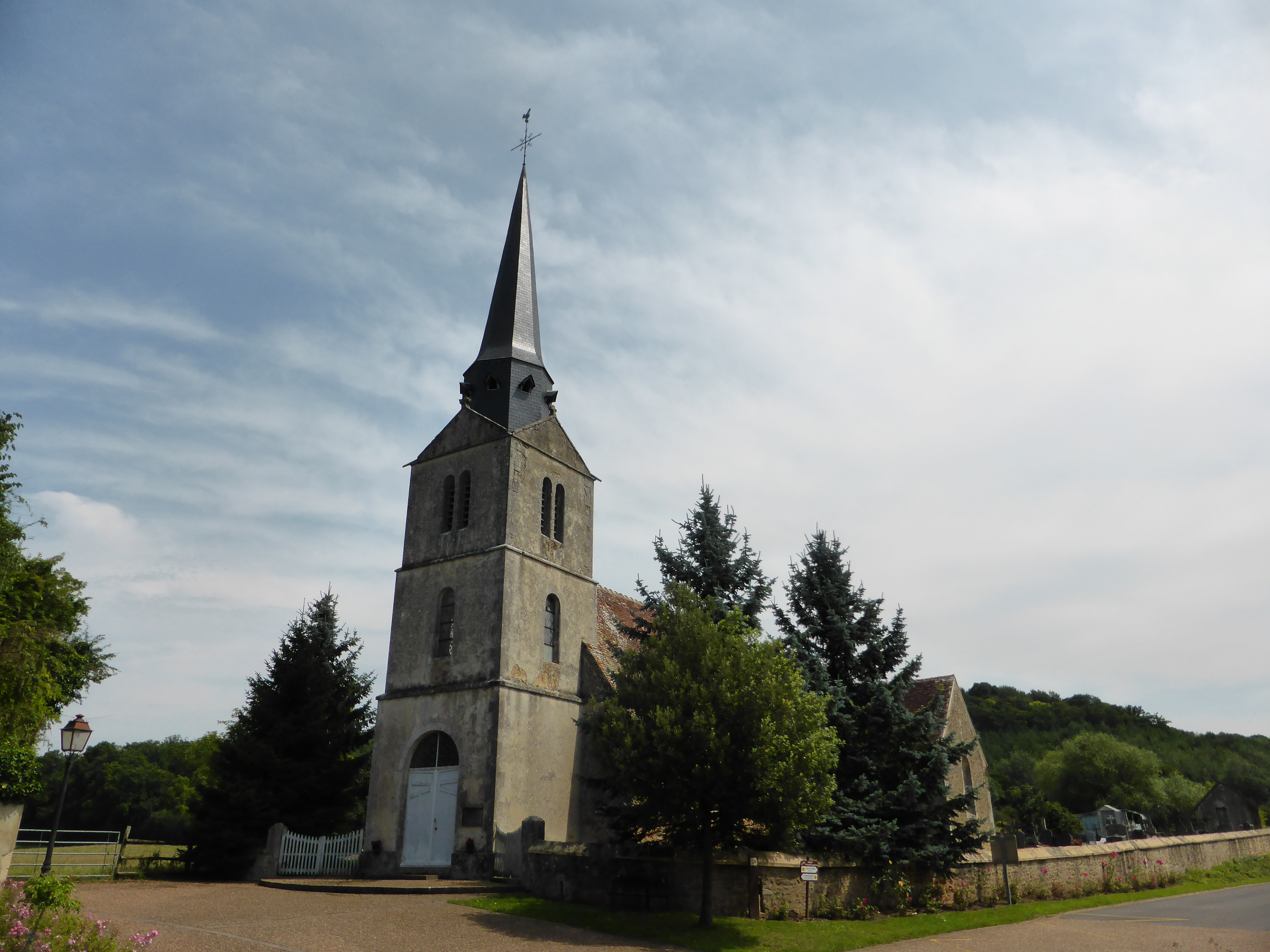
- The church in Vaunoise
- Location of Vaunoise
- Location within France Location within Normandy
- Coordinates: 48°21′26″N 0°29′12″E
- Country: France
- Region: Normandy
- Department: Orne
- Arrondissement: Mortagne-au-Perche
- Canton: Ceton
- Intercommunality: Collines du Perche Normand

Government
  - Mayor (2020–2026): Séverine Fontaine
- Area^{1}: 7.65 km^{2} (2.95 sq mi)
- Elevation: 109 m (358 ft)
- Highest elevation: 181 m (594 ft)
- Lowest elevation: 88 m (289 ft)
- Population (2023): 97
  - Density: 13/km^{2} (33/sq mi)
- Time zone: UTC+01:00 (CET)
  - Summer (DST): UTC+02:00 (CEST)
- INSEE/Postal code: 61498 /61130
- ^{1} French Land Register data, which excludes lakes, ponds, glaciers > 1 km^{2} (0.386 sq mi or 247 acres) and river estuaries.

Vaunoise (French pronunciation: [vonwaz]) is a commune in the Orne department in north-western France.

== Geography ==
Vaunoise along with the communes of Belforêt-en-Perche, Saint-Martin-du-Vieux-Bellême, Igé and Appenai-sous-Bellême is part of the Bois et coteaux calcaires sous Belleme a Natura 2000 conservation site. The site measures 105 hectares and is home to the European stag beetle and European ash.

A stream, called the Ruisseau du plessis, flows through the commune.

== See also ==
- Communes of the Orne department
