= Appenai-sous-Bellême =

- Commune
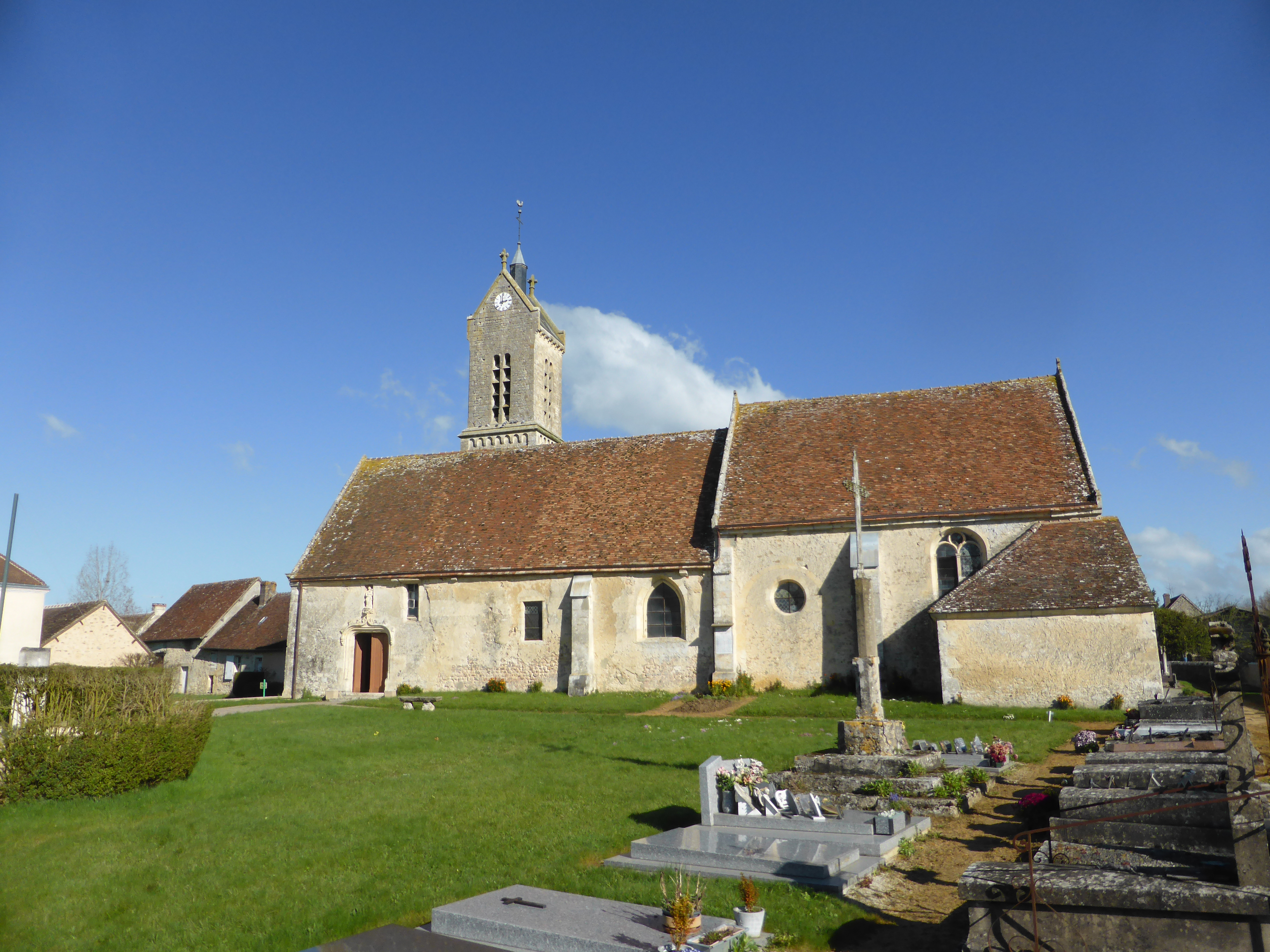
- The church in Appenai-sous-Bellême
- Location of Appenai-sous-Bellême
- Location within France Location within Normandy
- Coordinates: 48°20′43″N 0°33′32″E
- Country: France
- Region: Normandy
- Department: Orne
- Arrondissement: Mortagne-au-Perche
- Canton: Ceton

Government
  - Mayor (2020–2026): Daniel Jean
- Area^{1}: 10.74 km^{2} (4.15 sq mi)
- Elevation: 192 m (630 ft)
- Highest elevation: 196 m (643 ft)
- Lowest elevation: 123 m (404 ft)
- Population (2023): 275
  - Density: 25.6/km^{2} (66.3/sq mi)
- Time zone: UTC+01:00 (CET)
  - Summer (DST): UTC+02:00 (CEST)
- INSEE/Postal code: 61005 /61130
- ^{1} French Land Register data, which excludes lakes, ponds, glaciers > 1 km^{2} (0.386 sq mi or 247 acres) and river estuaries.

Appenai-sous-Bellême (French pronunciation: [apənɛ su bɛlɛm], Appenai under Bellême) is a commune in the Orne department in northwestern France.

== Geography ==
The commune is made up of the following collection of villages and hamlets, La Joffardière, La Vallée Aubry, Appenai-sous-Bellême, Le Plessis, Cône Bergère, La Métairie, La Heulinière, La Ramblaise and La Vacherie.

Appenai-sous-Bellême along with the communes of Vaunoise, Saint-Martin-du-Vieux-Bellême, Igé and Belforêt-en-Perche is part of the Bois et coteaux calcaires sous Belleme a Natura 2000 conservation site. The site measures 105 hectares and is home to the European stag beetle and European ash.

A river, La Coudre flows through the commune.

== Population ==
Historical population
Year	Pop.	±% p.a.
1968	293	—
1975	238	−2.93%
1982	199	−2.52%
1990	223	+1.43%
1999	222	−0.05%
2007	234	+0.66%
2012	253	+1.57%
2017	276	+1.76%
2023	275	−0.06%
Source: INSEE

== Points of Interest ==
=== National heritage sites ===
- Château des Feugerets is a 16th-century Chateau, declared as a Monument historique in 2001. The Chateau grounds are shared with the neighbouring commune of La Chapelle-Souëf

== See also ==
- Communes of the Orne department
