= Bois et coteaux calcaires sous Belleme =

Bois et coteaux calcaires sous Belleme translated as the limestone woods and hillsides under Belleme is a Natura 2000 conservation area that is 105 hectares in size.

== Geography ==
The area is based on Oxfordian limestone formations that create dry to very dry lawns for plants and woods to grow on. The area has a significant range of orchids.

It is spread across 5 different communes all within three departments the Orne;

1. Appenai-sous-Bellême
2. Belforêt-en-Perche
3. Igé
4. Saint-Martin-du-Vieux-Bellême
5. Vaunoise

== Conservation ==
The conservation area has a single species listed in Annex 2 of the Habitats Directive, which is the European stag beetle. In addition the Natura 2000 site has five habitats protected under the Habitats Directive.
