= Origny (disambiguation) =

Origny is a commune in the Côte-d'Or department in eastern France. Origny may also refer to

- Origny-en-Thiérache, a commune in the Aisne department in Picardy in northern France
- Origny-Sainte-Benoite, a commune in the Aisne department in Picardy in northern France
- Origny-le-Sec, a commune in the Aube department in north-central France
- Origny-le-Roux, a commune in the Orne department in north-western France
- Origny-le-Butin a commune in the Orne department in north-western France
