= Sérigny =

Serigny may refer to:

== Toponyms ==
=== Canada ===
- Sérigny River, a tributary of the Caniapiscau River in Nord-du-Québec, Quebec

=== France ===
- Sérigny, Orne, a commune in the Orne department
- Sérigny, Vienne, a commune in the Vienne department
