= La Chapelle-Souëf =

- Commune
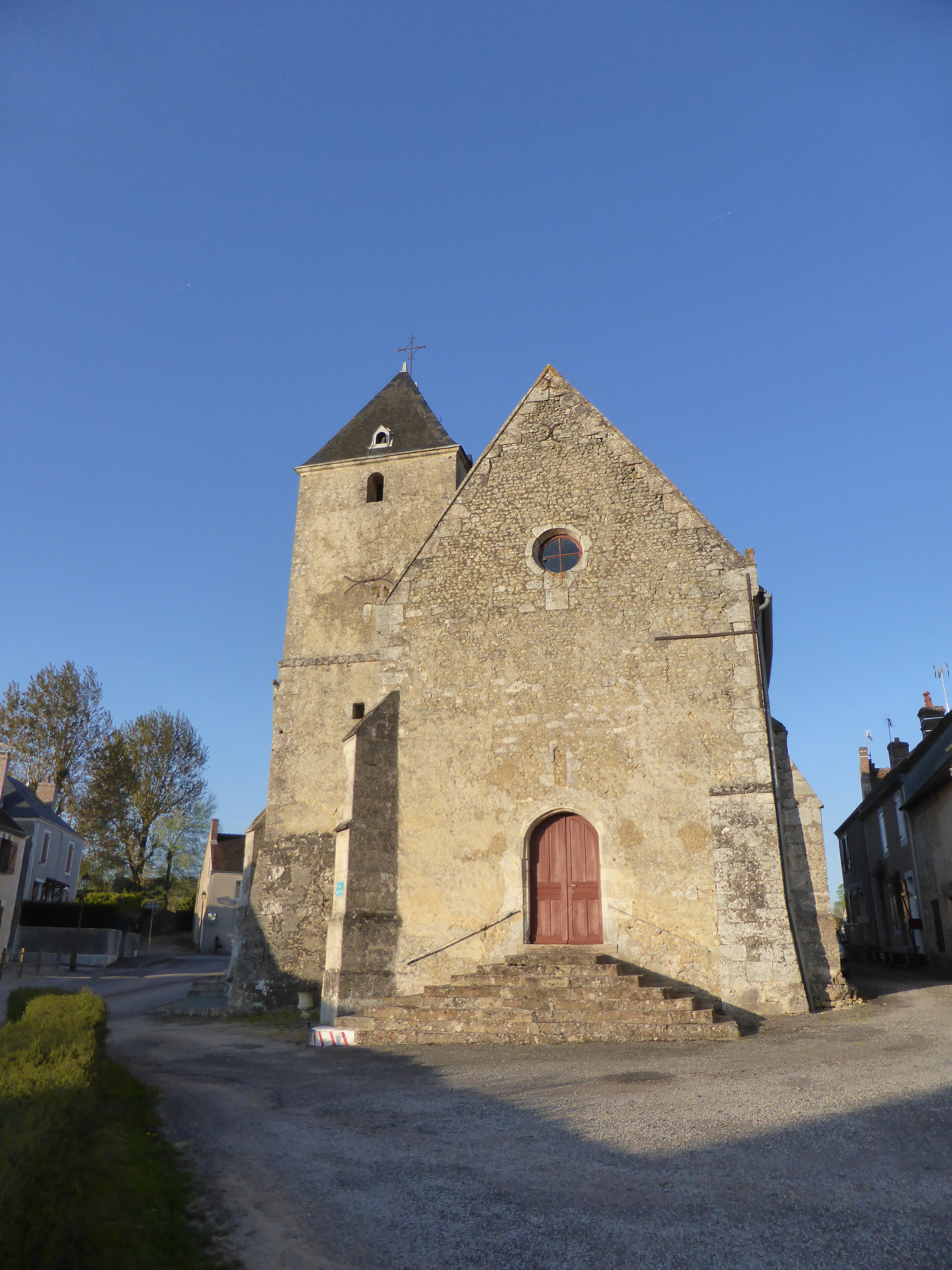
- The church in La Chapelle-Souëf
- Location of La Chapelle-Souëf
- Location within France Location within Normandy
- Coordinates: 48°19′27″N 0°35′48″E
- Country: France
- Region: Normandy
- Department: Orne
- Arrondissement: Mortagne-au-Perche
- Canton: Ceton
- Intercommunality: Collines du Perche Normand

Government
  - Mayor (2020–2026): Sylvie Mabire
- Area^{1}: 11.13 km^{2} (4.30 sq mi)
- Elevation: 122 m (400 ft)
- Highest elevation: 198 m (650 ft)
- Lowest elevation: 111 m (364 ft)
- Population (2023): 246
  - Density: 22.1/km^{2} (57.2/sq mi)
- Time zone: UTC+01:00 (CET)
  - Summer (DST): UTC+02:00 (CEST)
- INSEE/Postal code: 61099 /61130
- ^{1} French Land Register data, which excludes lakes, ponds, glaciers > 1 km^{2} (0.386 sq mi or 247 acres) and river estuaries.

La Chapelle-Souëf (French pronunciation: [la ʃaˈpɛl swɛf]) is a commune in the Orne department in north-western France.

== Geography ==
The commune is made up of the following collection of villages and hamlets, La Chapelle-Souëf, La Filochère, La Petite Filochère, La Coudre and Les Bézardières.

A river, La Coudre and one of its tributaries la Rozière flow through the commune.

== Notable buildings and places ==
=== National heritage sites ===
- Château des Feugerets is a 16th-century Cahteau, declared as a Monument historique in 2001. The Chateau grounds are shared with the neighbouring commune of Appenai-sous-Bellême

== See also ==
- Communes of the Orne department
