= Le Gué-de-la-Chaîne =

- Part of Belforêt-en-Perche
- Location of Le Gué-de-la-Chaîne
- Location within France Location within Normandy
- Coordinates: 48°22′33″N 0°31′25″E
- Country: France
- Region: Normandy
- Department: Orne
- Arrondissement: Mortagne-au-Perche
- Canton: Ceton
- Commune: Belforêt-en-Perche
- Area^{1}: 18.64 km^{2} (7.20 sq mi)
- Highest elevation: 234 m (768 ft)
- Lowest elevation: 170 m (560 ft)
- Population (2022): 676
  - Density: 36.3/km^{2} (93.9/sq mi)
- Time zone: UTC+01:00 (CET)
  - Summer (DST): UTC+02:00 (CEST)
- Postal code: 61130
- ^{1} French Land Register data, which excludes lakes, ponds, glaciers > 1 km^{2} (0.386 sq mi or 247 acres) and river estuaries.

Le Gué-de-la-Chaîne (French pronunciation: [lə ɡe d(ə) la ʃɛːn]) is a former commune in the Orne department in north-western France. On 1 January 2017, it was merged into the new commune Belforêt-en-Perche.

== See also ==
- Communes of the Orne department
