= Eperrais =

- Part of Belforêt-en-Perche
- Location of Eperrais
- Location within France Location within Normandy
- Coordinates: 48°25′24″N 0°33′01″E
- Country: France
- Region: Normandy
- Department: Orne
- Arrondissement: Mortagne-au-Perche
- Canton: Ceton
- Commune: Belforêt-en-Perche
- Area^{1}: 14.12 km^{2} (5.45 sq mi)
- Highest elevation: 238 m (781 ft)
- Lowest elevation: 147 m (482 ft)
- Population (2022): 105
  - Density: 7.44/km^{2} (19.3/sq mi)
- Time zone: UTC+01:00 (CET)
  - Summer (DST): UTC+02:00 (CEST)
- Postal code: 61400
- ^{1} French Land Register data, which excludes lakes, ponds, glaciers > 1 km^{2} (0.386 sq mi or 247 acres) and river estuaries.

Eperrais (French pronunciation: [epɛʁɛ]) is a former commune in the Orne department in north-western France. On 1 January 2017, it was merged into the new commune Belforêt-en-Perche.

== See also ==
- Communes of the Orne department
