= Butin (surname) =

Butin is a surname of French or Slavic origin (masculine; Russian: Бутин) or Butina (feminine; Russian: Бутина) that may refer to

- Édouard Butin (born 1988), French football striker
- Jacques Butin (1925–1998), French former field hockey player
- Maria Butina (born 1988), Russian foreign agent
- Mary Ryerson Butin (1857–1944), American physician
- Roy Butin (1876–1943), American recording artist
- Tomislav Butina (born 1974), Croatian football goalkeeper
