= Saint-Ouen-de-la-Cour =

- Part of Belforêt-en-Perche
- Location of Saint-Ouen-de-la-Cour
- Location within France Location within Normandy
- Coordinates: 48°24′51″N 0°35′20″E
- Country: France
- Region: Normandy
- Department: Orne
- Arrondissement: Mortagne-au-Perche
- Canton: Ceton
- Commune: Belforêt-en-Perche
- Area^{1}: 6.04 km^{2} (2.33 sq mi)
- Elevation: 170 m (560 ft)
- Highest elevation: 262 m (860 ft)
- Lowest elevation: 164 m (538 ft)
- Population (2022): 55
  - Density: 9.1/km^{2} (24/sq mi)
- Time zone: UTC+01:00 (CET)
  - Summer (DST): UTC+02:00 (CEST)
- Postal code: 61130
- ^{1} French Land Register data, which excludes lakes, ponds, glaciers > 1 km^{2} (0.386 sq mi or 247 acres) and river estuaries.

Saint-Ouen-de-la-Cour (French pronunciation: [sɛ̃.t‿wɛ̃ də la kuʁ]) is a former commune in the Orne department in north-western France. On 1 January 2017, it was merged into the new commune Belforêt-en-Perche.

== See also ==
- Communes of the Orne department
