= Jacques Butin =

French field hockey player (1925–1998)

Jean Émile Butin (20 September 1925 – 20 December 1998) was a French field hockey player who competed in the 1948 Summer Olympics.
