= Origny-le-Butin =

- Part of Belforêt-en-Perche
- Location of Origny-le-Butin
- Location within France Location within Normandy
- Coordinates: 48°22′20″N 0°28′07″E
- Country: France
- Region: Normandy
- Department: Orne
- Arrondissement: Mortagne-au-Perche
- Canton: Ceton
- Commune: Belforêt-en-Perche
- Area^{1}: 4.57 km^{2} (1.76 sq mi)
- Highest elevation: 228 m (748 ft)
- Lowest elevation: 107 m (351 ft)
- Population (2022): 88
  - Density: 19/km^{2} (50/sq mi)
- Time zone: UTC+01:00 (CET)
  - Summer (DST): UTC+02:00 (CEST)
- Postal code: 61130
- ^{1} French Land Register data, which excludes lakes, ponds, glaciers > 1 km^{2} (0.386 sq mi or 247 acres) and river estuaries.

Origny-le-Butin (French pronunciation: [ɔʁiɲi lə bytɛ̃]) is a former commune in the Orne department in north-western France. On 1 January 2017, it was merged into the new commune Belforêt-en-Perche. Its population was 88 in 2022.

The area was studied in the form of a microhistory by the French historian Alain Corbin in his book The Life of an Unknown (2001).

The French painter Jean Bouvier lived in Origny-le-Butin and painted many landscapes of the area.

== See also ==
- Communes of the Orne department
