= Sérigny, Orne =

Sérigny
- Part of Belforêt-en-Perche
- Location of Sérigny
- Location within France Location within Normandy
- Coordinates: 48°22′22″N 0°34′31″E
- Country: France
- Region: Normandy
- Department: Orne
- Arrondissement: Mortagne-au-Perche
- Canton: Ceton
- Commune: Belforêt-en-Perche
- Area^{1}: 15.00 km^{2} (5.79 sq mi)
- Elevation: 232 m (761 ft)
- Highest elevation: 252 m (827 ft)
- Lowest elevation: 147 m (482 ft)
- Population (2022): 349
  - Density: 23.3/km^{2} (60.3/sq mi)
- Time zone: UTC+01:00 (CET)
  - Summer (DST): UTC+02:00 (CEST)
- Postal code: 61130
- ^{1} French Land Register data, which excludes lakes, ponds, glaciers > 1 km^{2} (0.386 sq mi or 247 acres) and river estuaries.

Sérigny (French pronunciation: [seʁiɲi]) is a former commune in the Orne department in north-western France. On 1 January 2017, it was merged into the new commune Belforêt-en-Perche.

== See also ==
- Communes of the Orne department
