= Jean Bouvier (French painter) =

French painter

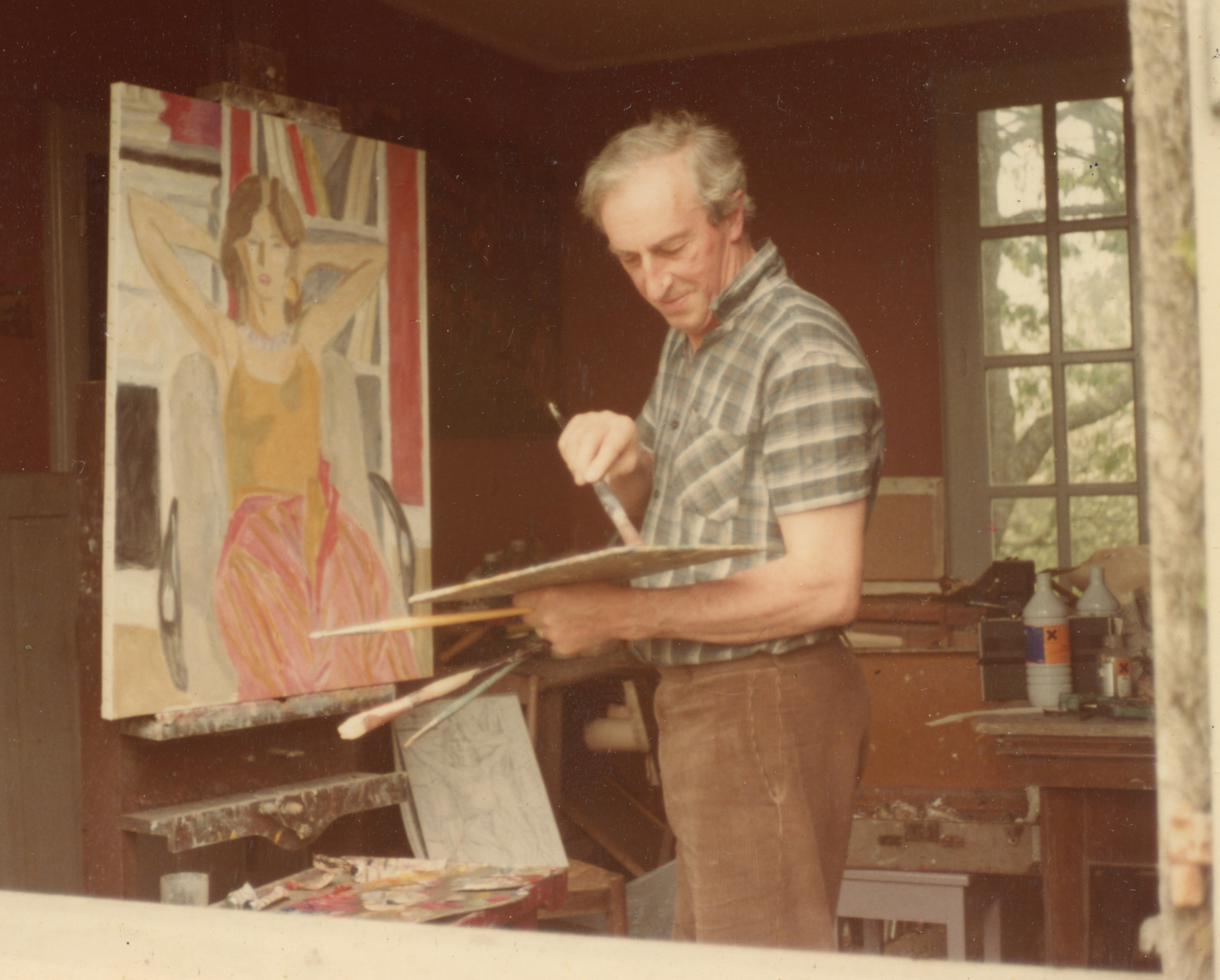
- Jean Bouvier painting at his Perche studio in France
- Born: 1 June 1924; Le Mans
- Died: 15 January 2022 (aged 97); Paris

Jean Louis Bouvier (1 June 1924 – 15 January 2022) was a French painter.

The son of Jacques Bouvier and of the embroiderer Thérèse Bouvier, he studied at the École nationale supérieure des beaux-arts and the École des langues orientales. Associated with the artists Maurice Loutreuil, Constant Le Breton, Louis Valtat, and Houdoin, Jean Bouvier engaged in decorative work in his youth (stained-glass windows for Sainte-Reine in Levallois) and apprenticed in fresco painting with the artist Léon Toublanc. However, it was primarily with Jean Fournier, Nirode Mazumdar, and Thierry Vernet that he developed his artistic practice. Vernet introduced him to the Polish painter Józef Czapski and the travel writer Nicolas Bouvier.

His works include unhurried, soft-hued paintings of natural landscapes in Perche, street scenes from Paris, New York City and Venice, and nude portraits, including many of his wife Anne Campbell. They have been described as inviting "a slow, attentive gaze, where the painting neither imposes itself nor demands explanation, but is instead inhabited, unfolding gradually within a space of calm and shared concentration".

He was a member of the Salon d'Automne for many years.

Describing his work, Bouvier wrote

"I believe that our raison d'être, as artists, is to convey our sense of wonder, as if we truly had an account to give to the world." There is something in a painter's life that is never lacking: the exhilaration of the moment when, rightly or wrongly, he believes that through painting he will truly decipher the hidden meaning of the things around him, that, pencil or brush in hand, the significance of their rhythm and structure is within his grasp. When Morandi asserted that there is nothing more abstract than the visible world, he meant, it seems to me, that the painter's truth can substitute for a world that is re-presented, present, revealed, and in response to the ever-changing, elusive, enigmatic reality. Art, like fire and love, lives by its own existence. And, like them, it needs sustenance: painting survives only if it feeds on vision. The more one paints, the more one sees; the more one sees, the more one desires to paint. But since what we feel the need to express is pure intuition, speakable, we have little control over the unfolding of a miracle that only asks to be aborted and yet only awaits us to exist; hence this feverish approach that we call work and which is above all a struggle for freedom in relation to oneself."

== Exhibitions ==
Exhibitions accompanied by a catalogue include:

- Galerie Aittouarès, 2001
- Galerie Nicolas Deman in Paris, 2006
- Prieuré de Mayanne, 2009
- Galerie Almond Hartzog in San Francisco, 2011
- Mairie du IVe in Paris and Galerie Berthet Aittouarès, 2018
- Galerie Cyril Guerniéri, 2023
- Galería Plaza del Gato, Madrid 2026

== Bibliography ==
- Henri Raynal (2018), Infidélité par amour. Sur la peinture de Jean Bouvier. Phœnix (29), pp. 138–140.
- Jean Bouvier (2006), La lumière discrète d'une œuvre oubliée : Louis Houdoin (1883–1966). Revue historique et archéologique du Maine (CLVII), pp. 97–108.
