= La Perrière, Orne =

La Perrière
- Part of Belforêt-en-Perche
- Location of La Perrière
- Location within France Location within Normandy
- Coordinates: 48°23′25″N 0°26′35″E
- Country: France
- Region: Normandy
- Department: Orne
- Arrondissement: Mortagne-au-Perche
- Canton: Ceton
- Commune: Belforêt-en-Perche
- Area^{1}: 16.16 km^{2} (6.24 sq mi)
- Elevation: 227 m (745 ft)
- Highest elevation: 226 m (741 ft)
- Lowest elevation: 122 m (400 ft)
- Population (2022): 213
  - Density: 13.2/km^{2} (34.1/sq mi)
- Demonym: Perriérois
- Time zone: UTC+01:00 (CET)
  - Summer (DST): UTC+02:00 (CEST)
- Postal code: 61360
- ^{1} French Land Register data, which excludes lakes, ponds, glaciers > 1 km^{2} (0.386 sq mi or 247 acres) and river estuaries.

La Perrière (French pronunciation: [la pɛʁjɛʁ]) is a former commune in the Orne department in north-western France. It is classed as a Petites Cités de Caractère. On 1 January 2017, it was merged into the new commune Belforêt-en-Perche.

== See also ==
- Communes of the Orne department
