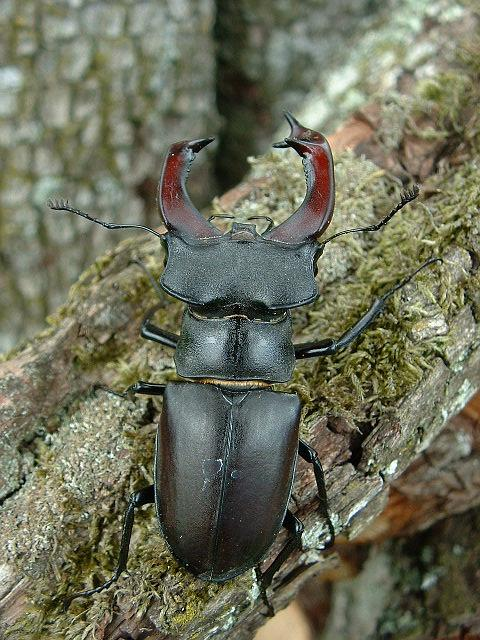
- Male
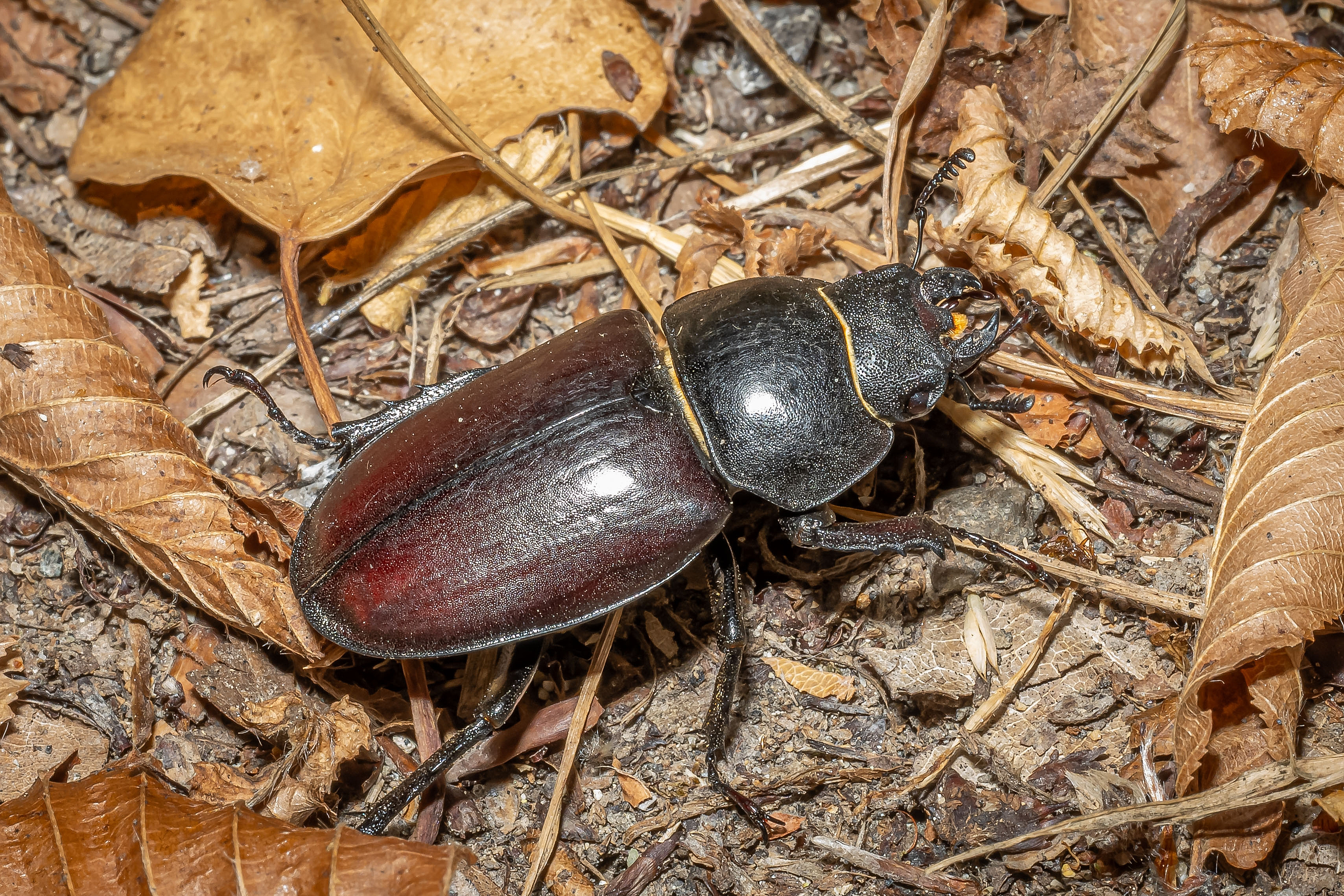
- Female

Conservation status
- Near Threatened (IUCN 3.1) (Europe)

- Least Concern (IUCN 3.1) (Mediterranean)

Scientific classification
- Kingdom: Animalia
- Phylum: Arthropoda
- Clade: Pancrustacea
- Class: Insecta
- Order: Coleoptera
- Suborder: Polyphaga
- Infraorder: Scarabaeiformia
- Family: Lucanidae
- Genus: Lucanus
- Species: L. cervus

Binomial name
- Lucanus cervus (Linnaeus, 1758)
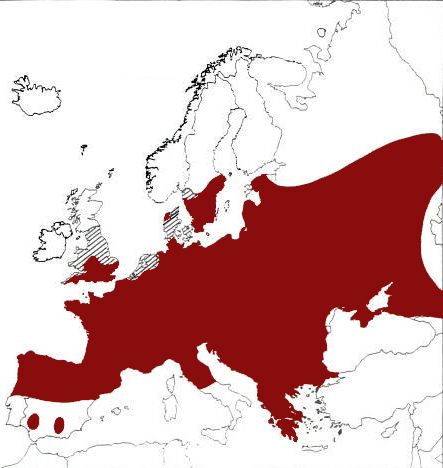

Synonyms
- Lucanus scapulodonta Weinreich, 1963; Scarabaeus cervus Linnaeus, 1758; Scarabaeus tridentatus Linnaeus, 1758 (partim)

= Lucanus cervus =

Species of beetle

Lucanus cervus, known as the European stag beetle, or the greater stag beetle, is one of the best-known species of stag beetle (family Lucanidae) in Western Europe, and is the eponymous example of the genus. L. cervus is listed as Near Threatened in Europe by the IUCN Red List.

== Taxonomy ==
Lucanus cervus is situated in the genus Lucanus within the family Lucanidae. In the genus there are two subgenera: Lucanus Scopoli, 1763 and Pseudolucanus Hope and Westwood, 1845. The species L. cervus contains four subspecies. The nominate subspecies L. cervus cervus (Linnaeus, 1758) was established via the original description of the species in 1758. The three latterly added subspecies are L. cervus judaicus Planet, 1900, L. cervus laticornis Deyrolle, 1864, and L. cervus turcicus Sturm, 1843.

== Description ==
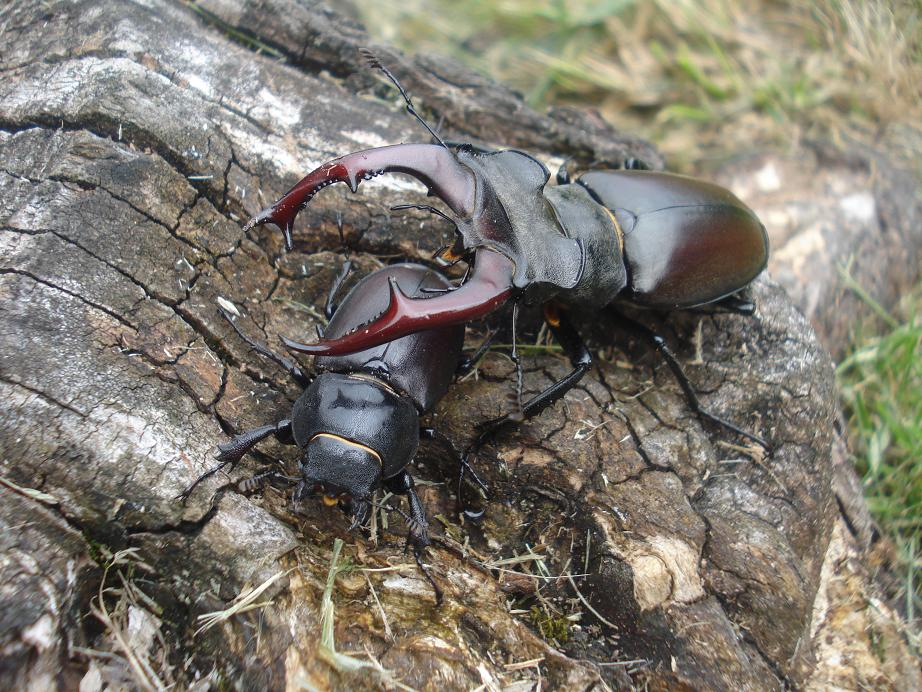
Sexual dimorphism – male and female

The European stag beetle is the largest beetle in Europe. Their colour is usually black with reddish elytra (and red mandibles in males). Sexually dimorphic, the males have enlarged mandibles and are larger than the females. Although the male's mandibles seem threatening, they are too weak to be harmful. Nevertheless, females can inflict a painful bite. The resemblance of the male's mandibles to the antlers of a stag, and their use in combat between males, much like with deer, gives the species its scientific and common names.

Adult size varies between different areas of its distribution, for example beetles from Spain, Germany, and the Netherlands are larger than those from Belgium or the UK. Males grow up to 7.5 centimetres (3.0 in) in length, and females grow between 3 and 5 centimetres (1.2 and 2.0 in).

In Britain, female Lucanus cervus are often confused with both sexes of the lesser stag beetle (Dorcus parallelipipedus). They can be distinguished as lesser stag beetles are smaller, with a completely black exoskeleton, and a larger, squarer head. Another difference is that Lucanus cervus larvae feed on wood below ground, and Dorcus parallelipipedus larvae eat wood above ground.

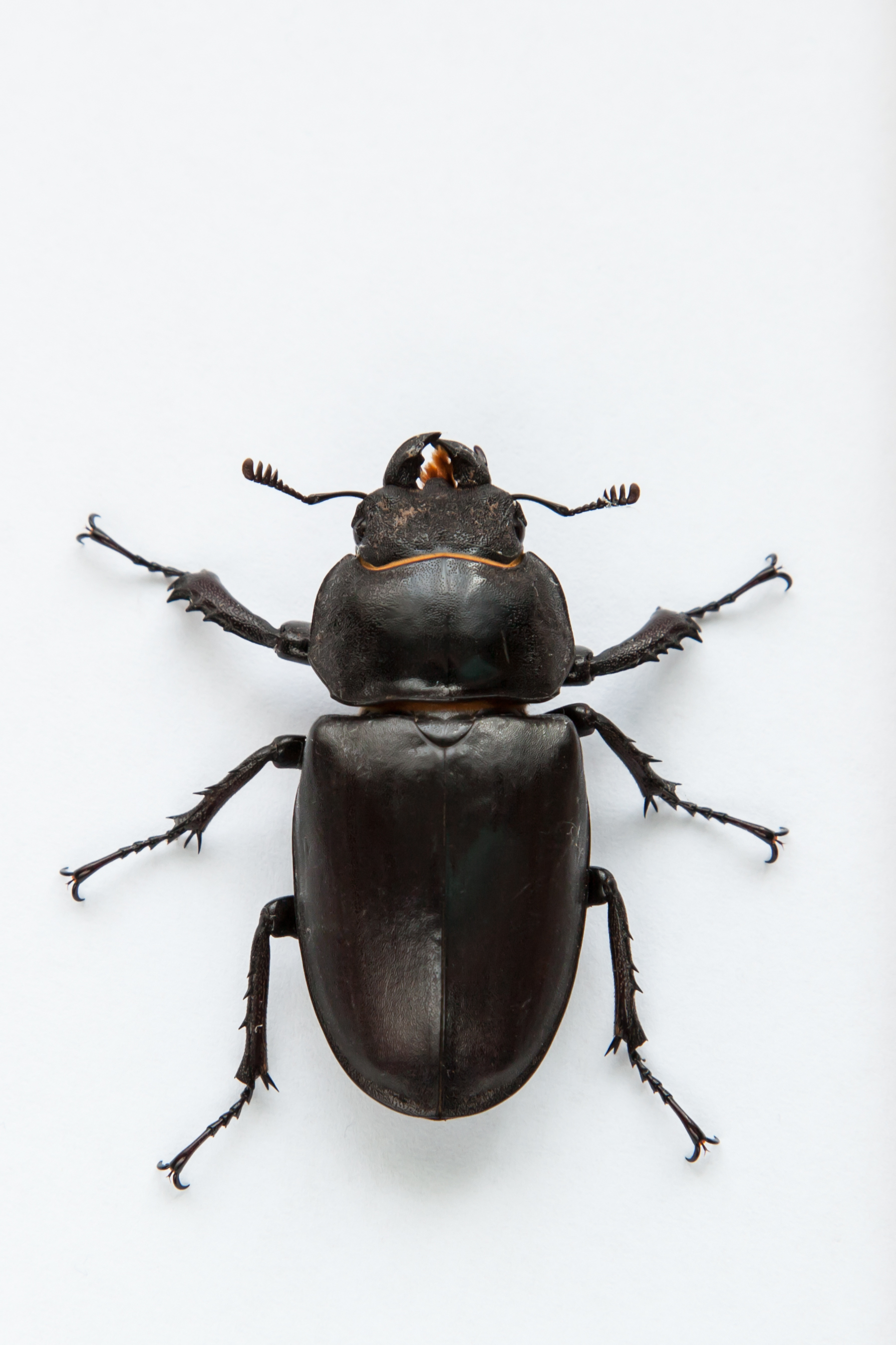
Lucanus cervus female

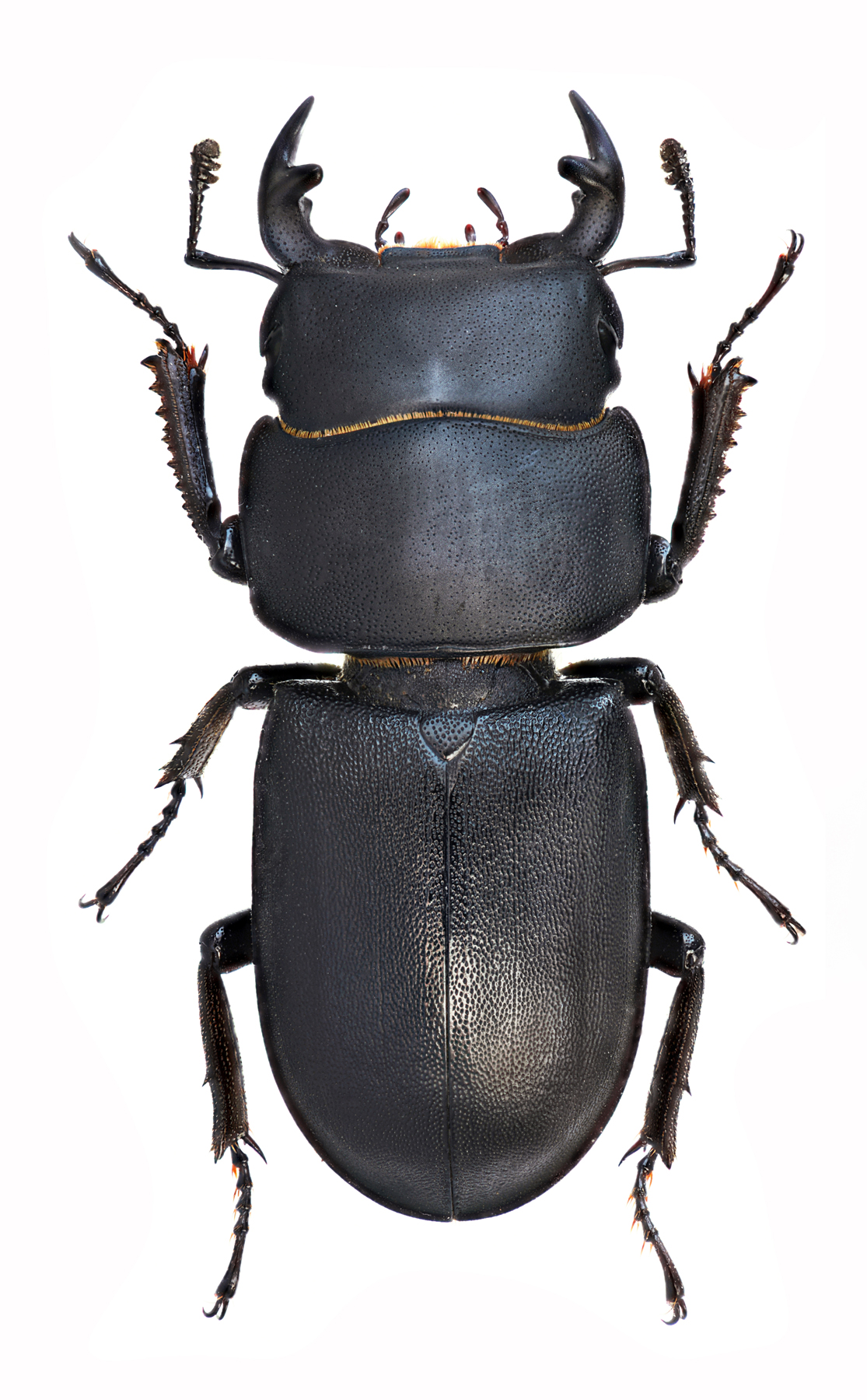
Dorcus parallelipipedus male

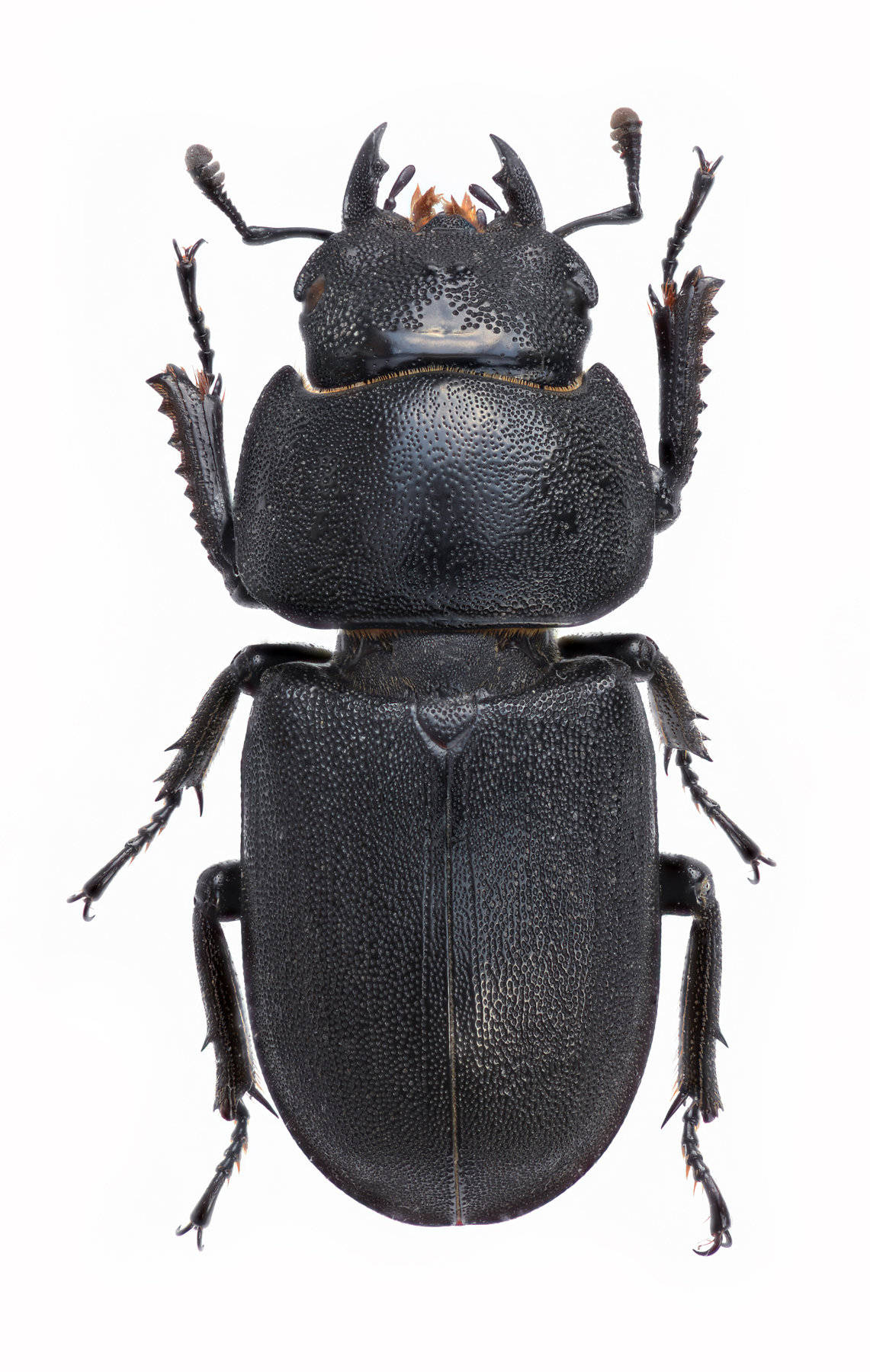
Dorcus parallelipipedus female

== Distribution and habitat ==
Lucanus cervus is widespread across Europe, though it is absent from Ireland. In Germany it is widespread, mainly in the south. In Hungary this species is widespread in the hilly and mountainous areas. In Romania it is widespread, especially in the hilly areas with sun exposed slopes. It also occurs in the European part of Turkey. In Italy it is mainly distributed in northern and central regions. In Spain and Portugal it is present only in the northern half of each country. In Britain it is largely confined to the south-east of England, where it is widespread. This species is now extinct in Latvia; it also disappeared from Denmark around 1970, but was reintroduced in 2013. It is also found in Caucasus, Asia Minor, Syria and west Kazakhstan. Its range is currently increasing only in Croatia and Slovakia.

Lucanus cervus has been associated with a range of trees including those in the genera oak (Quercus), lime (Tilia), beech (Fagus), willow (Salix), and certain species in other genera including black poplar (Populus nigra), ash (Fraxinus excelsior), horse chestnut (Aesculus hippocastanum), wild cherry (Prunus avium), and common walnut (Juglans regia). Larval development sites were found in proximity of dead wood of the allochthonous Quercus rubra.

== Life cycle ==
=== Life cycle ===
Adults appear during late May to the beginning of August, being most active in the evenings. Females lay about 30 eggs in a piece of decaying wood deep in the soil. Stag beetle larvae, which are blind and shaped like a letter "C", feed on rotting wood in a variety of places, tree stumps, old trees and shrubs, rotting fence posts, compost heaps, and leaf mould. The larvae have a cream-coloured, soft, transparent body with six orange legs, and an orange head which is very distinct from the very sharp brown pincers. They have combs in their legs which they use for communication (stridulation) with other larvae. The larvae go through several instars (stages), taking several years to become pupae. Males use their large mandibles to fight with each other in competition for females, intending to throw their opponent off the log or branch they are on.

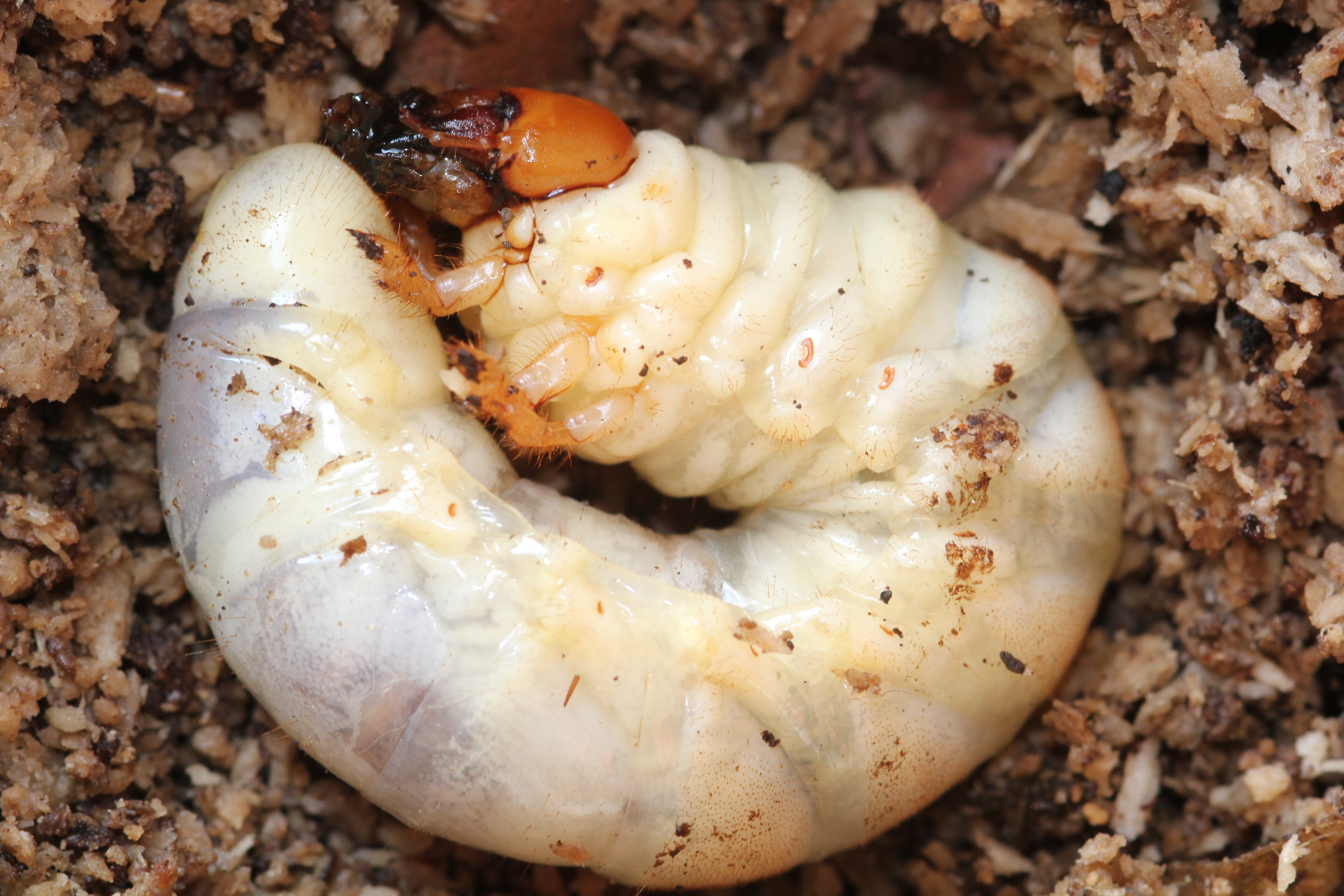
Mature larva

The work of entomologist Charlie Morgan during the late 1970s discovered that the pupae of the stag beetle live in the soil for about 3 months, then emerge in summer to awkwardly fly off to mate. Adults suck up the liquids of nectar, fallen fruit, and tree sap. Their slow, lumbering flight, usually at dusk, makes a distinctive low-pitched buzzing sound. The males fly more readily than the females.

=== Lifespan ===
Stag beetles spend most of their life as larvae and can take from 3 to 7 years for them to pupate, but the lifespan of the adults is only a few weeks.

== Subspecies ==
The species Lucanus cervus contains four subspecies, with Lucanus cervus cervus being the nominate subspecies. The three latterly added subspecies are L. cervus judaicus, L. cervus laticornis, L. cervus turcicus, and L. cervus akbesianus.

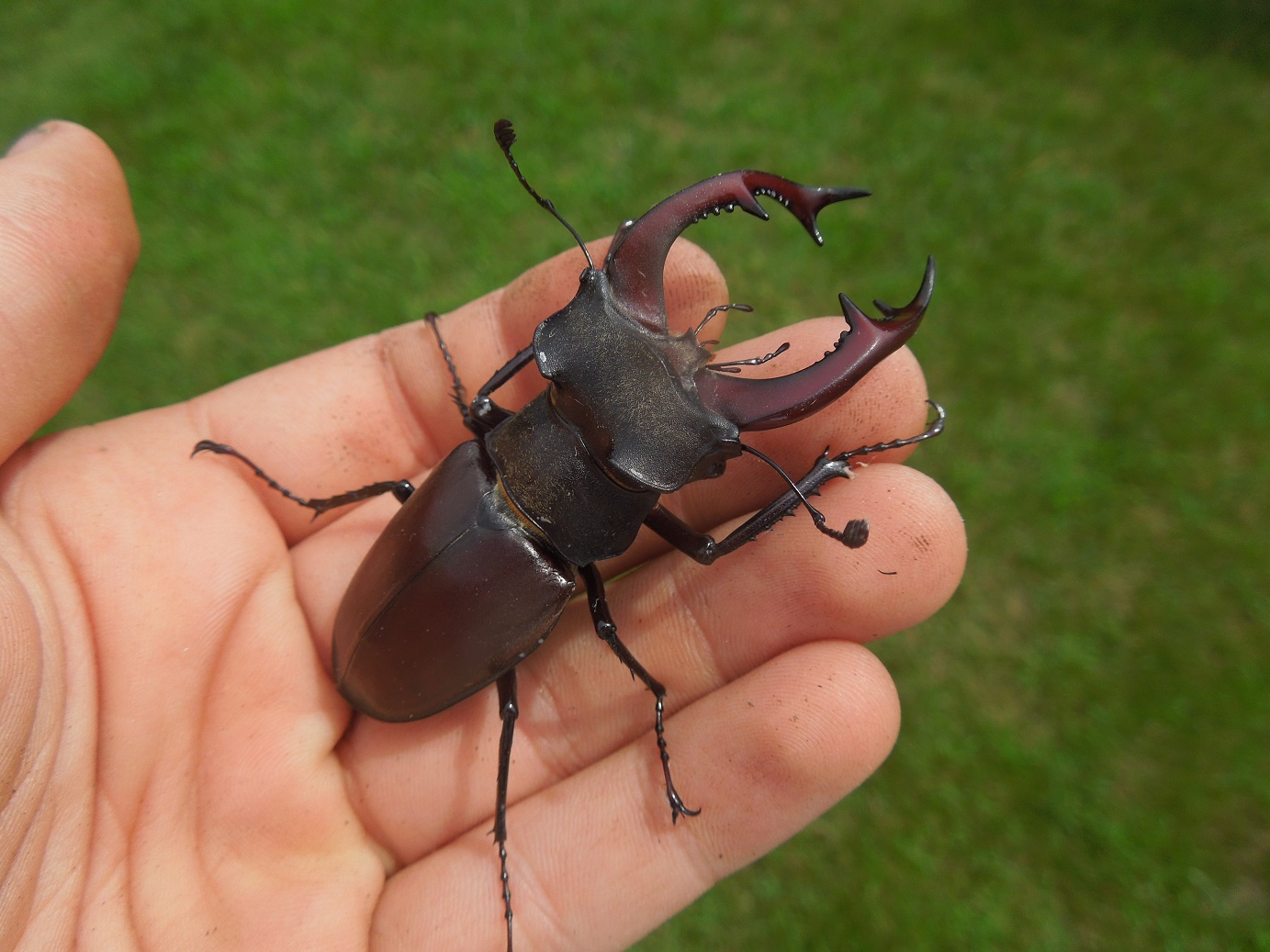
Lucanus cervus cervus

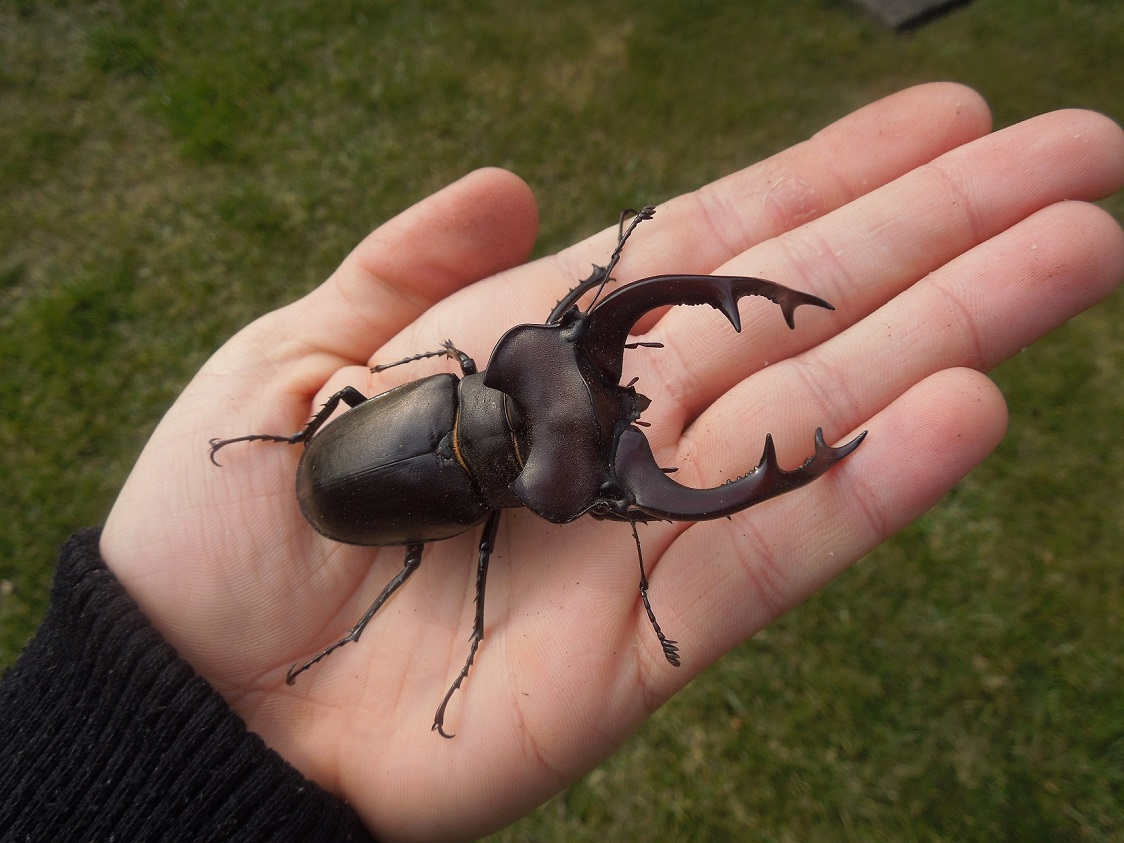
Lucanus cervus judaicus

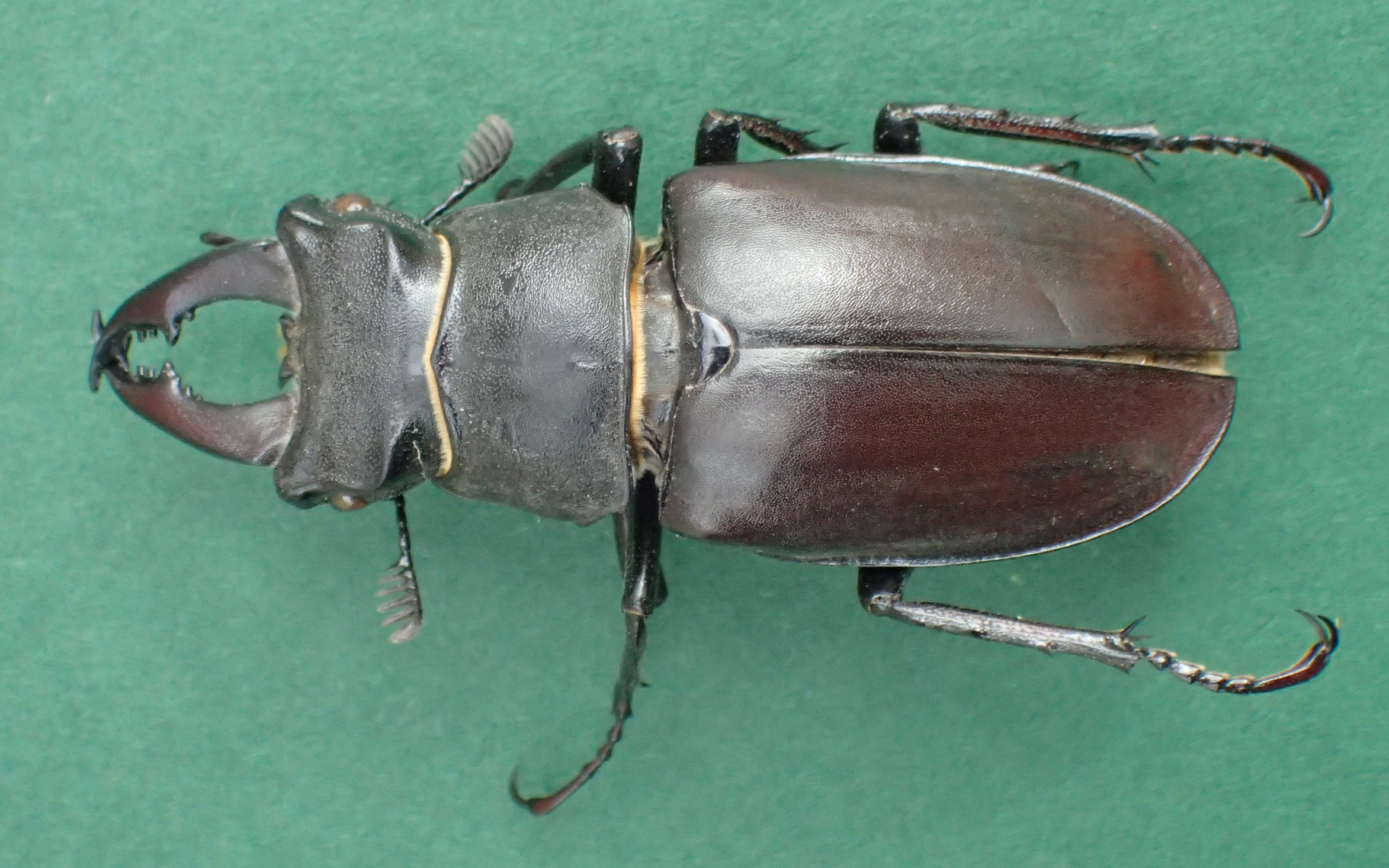
Lucanus cervus turcicus

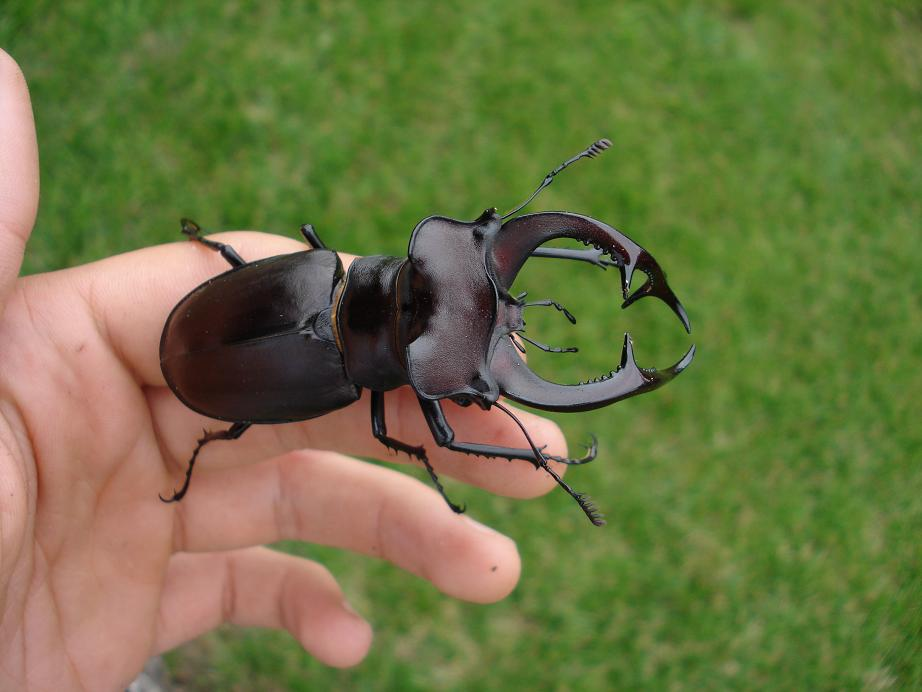
Lucanus cervus akbesianus

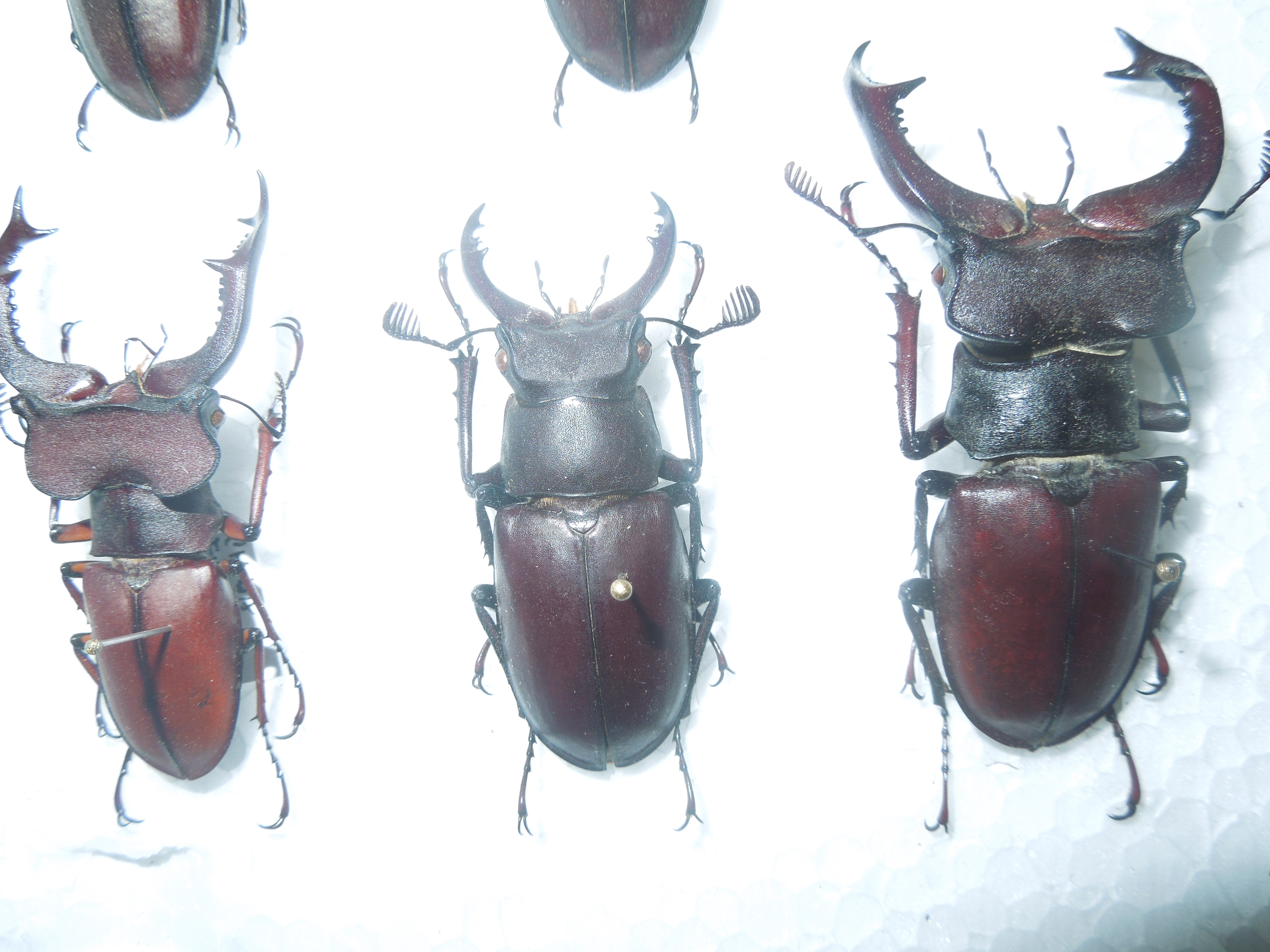
Lucanus cervus laticornis (middle)

== Behaviour and ecology ==
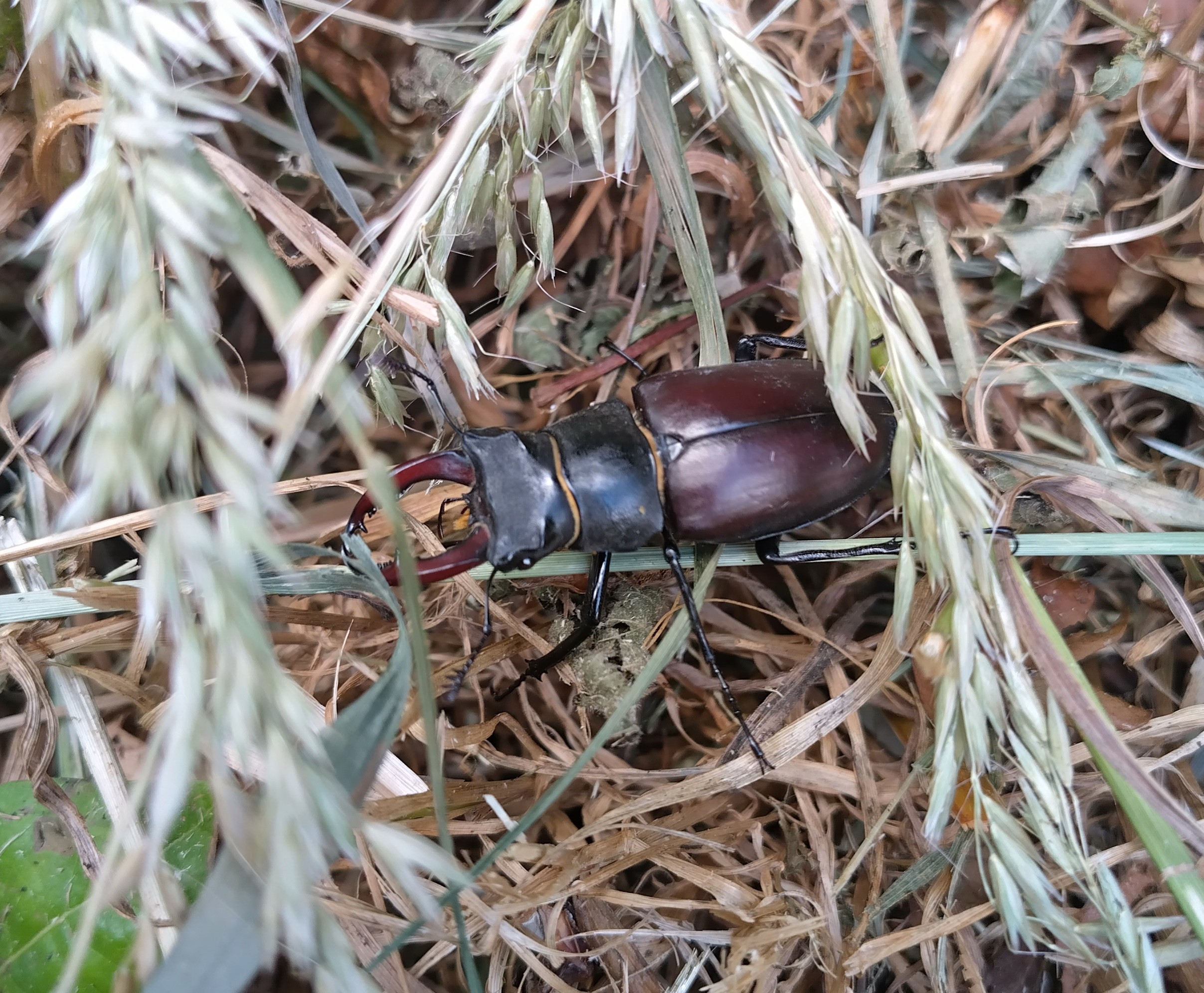
Lucanus cervus cervus in foliage. Salary Brook Local Nature Reserve, Colchester, Essex, June 2024

The natural reaction of the beetle to an approaching large object is to remain motionless, making them a good photographic subject.

=== Daily activity, use of space and detectability ===
In a primary ancient forest in northern Italy, stag beetle males were less elusive than females. Males were more frequently radio-tracked in flight, females mostly underground and in the proximity of deadwood. Males were mostly observed flying at sunset, and resting or walking on standing trees during the day. The combination of air temperature and humidity determined the optimal weather conditions for male flights. Flying at sunset, mostly performed by males, significantly increased the detectability of the species. Stag beetles are shown to be more active during the first part of their adult lives. Males were more prone to disperse than females but the home range size did not differ between the sexes. Dividing the flight season in three intervals, the most active individuals were recorded during the first and the second ones (first and second half of June).

=== Predators ===
Natural predators of L. cervus in Britain include cats, foxes, badgers, carrion crows, magpies, woodpeckers, kestrels, and false black widows; these tend to strike at the most vulnerable stage in the beetle's life cycle, when adults are seeking to mate and lay eggs. In the case of magpies, they have been observed in the field as waiting for emergence on a single site, subsequently consuming the beetle's abdomen.

In Italy, the main predator is the hooded crow (Corvus cornix).

=== Parasites ===
Mites in the order Monogynaspida (Suborder Uropodina) are phoretic (attached for the purpose of transportation) and have been observed attached to L. cervus as deutonymphs on the membrane of the joint between head and pronotum.

== Relationship with humans ==
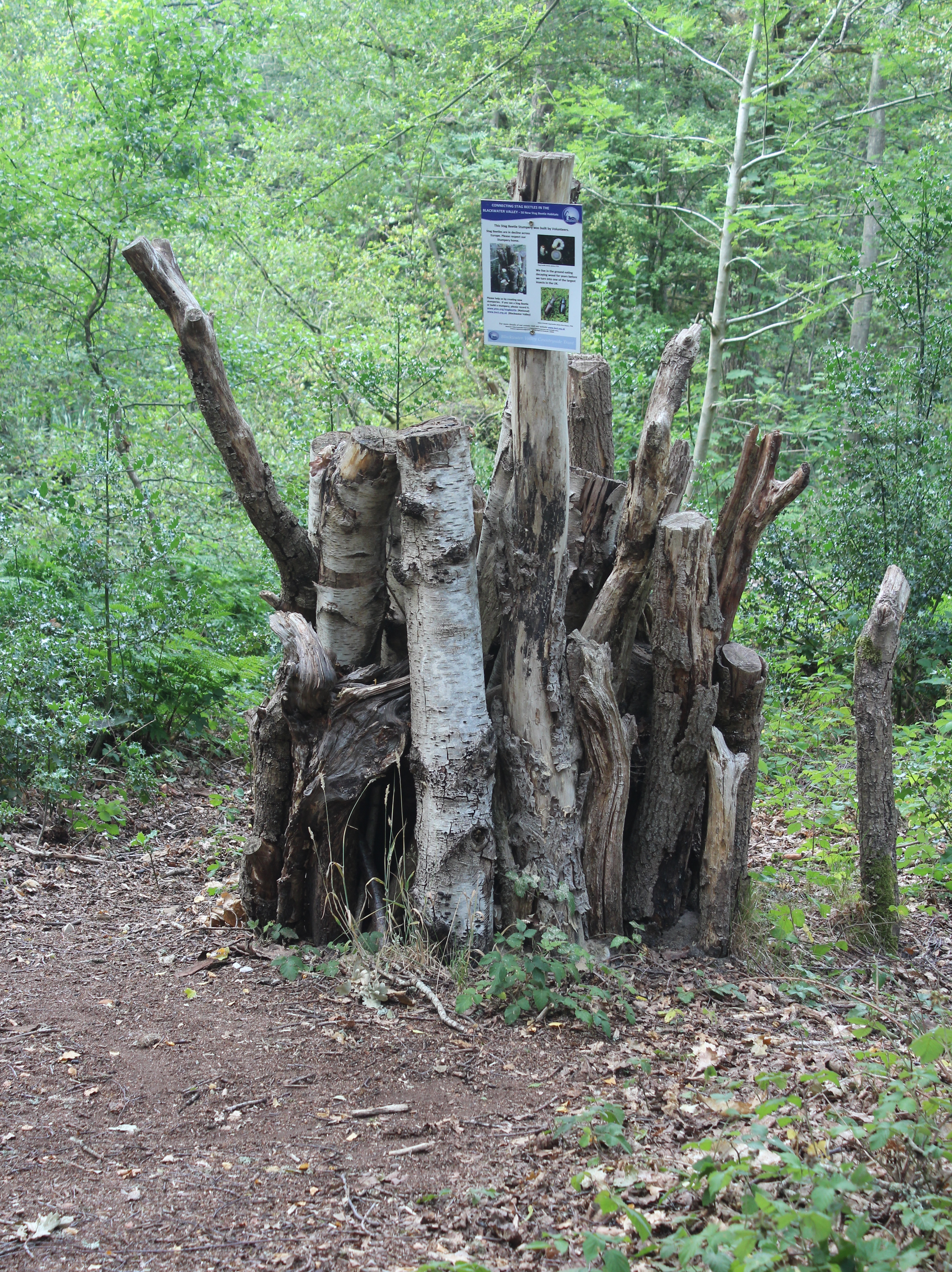
Log pyramid for stag beetles

=== Protection ===
Lucanus cervus is listed as Near Threatened by the IUCN Red List. Although this species is widely distributed in Europe, it is in significant decline in the north and central part of its range and future trends of European forests will pose serious threats to this species, thus making the species close to qualifying for Vulnerable.

Lucanus cervus is registered in the second appendix of the Habitats Directive of the European Union from 1992, which requires that member states set aside special areas of conservation. The species is also registered in the third appendix of the Convention on the Conservation of European Wildlife and Natural Habitats (Berne convention) of 1982 and Schedule 5 of the UK's Wildlife and Countryside Act 1981.

=== Log pyramids ===
Log pyramids, also called stumperies, are vertical log piles where the logs are buried upright, providing plenty of underground rotten broadleaf wood for stag beetle larvae to feed on, as their natural food sources are in decline.

== Gallery ==
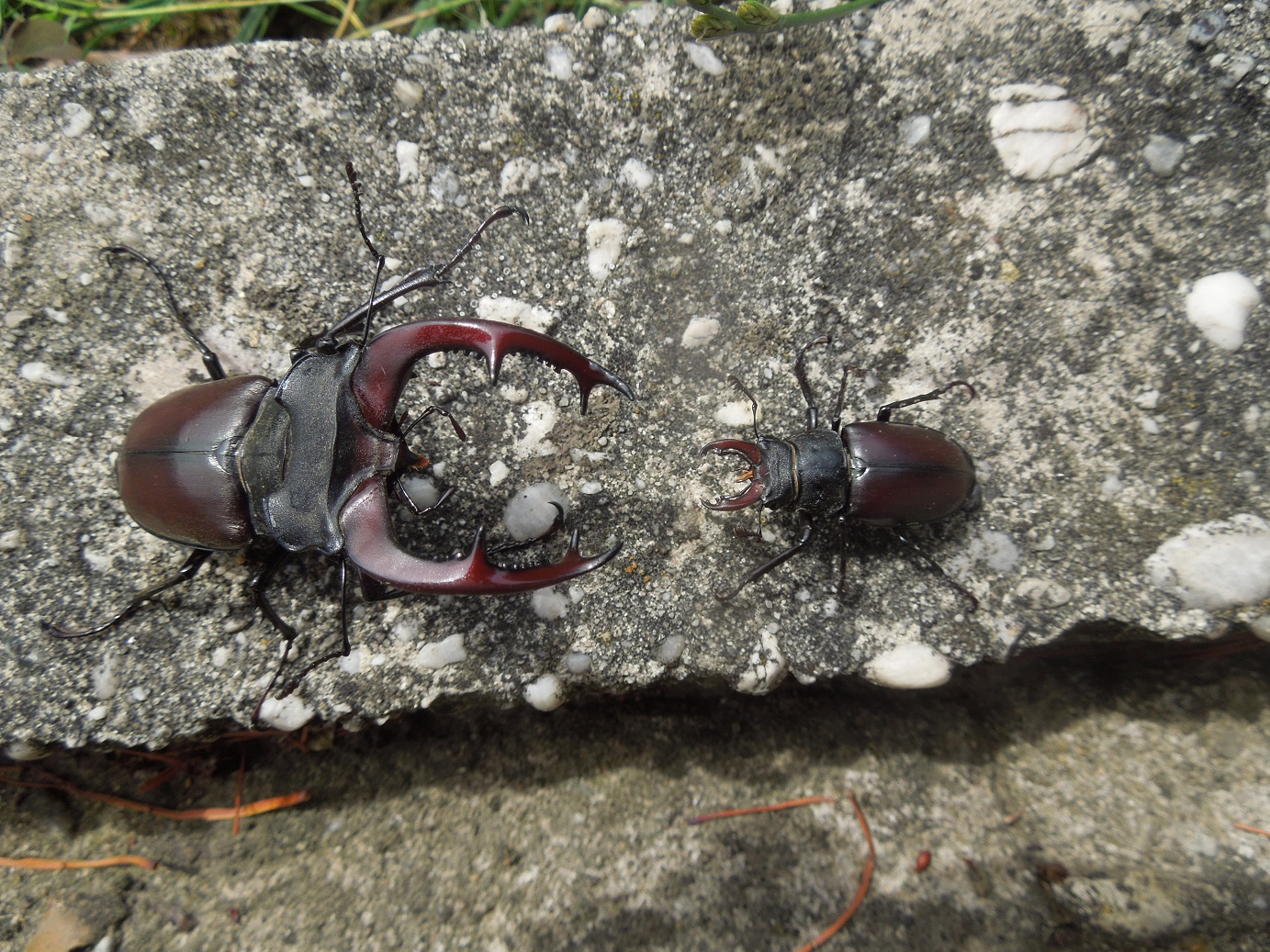
Size variation of males

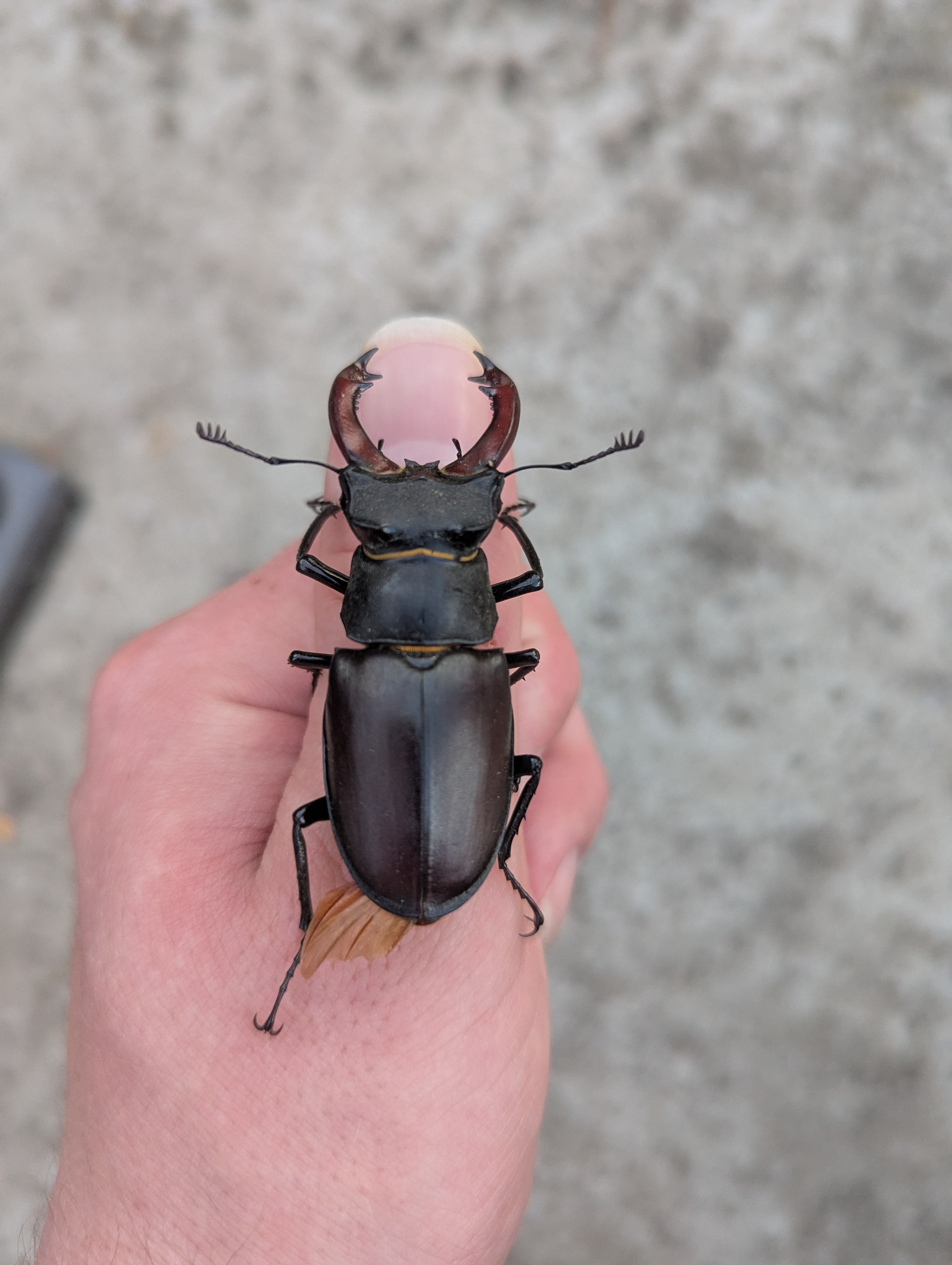
Male in comparison to a thumb

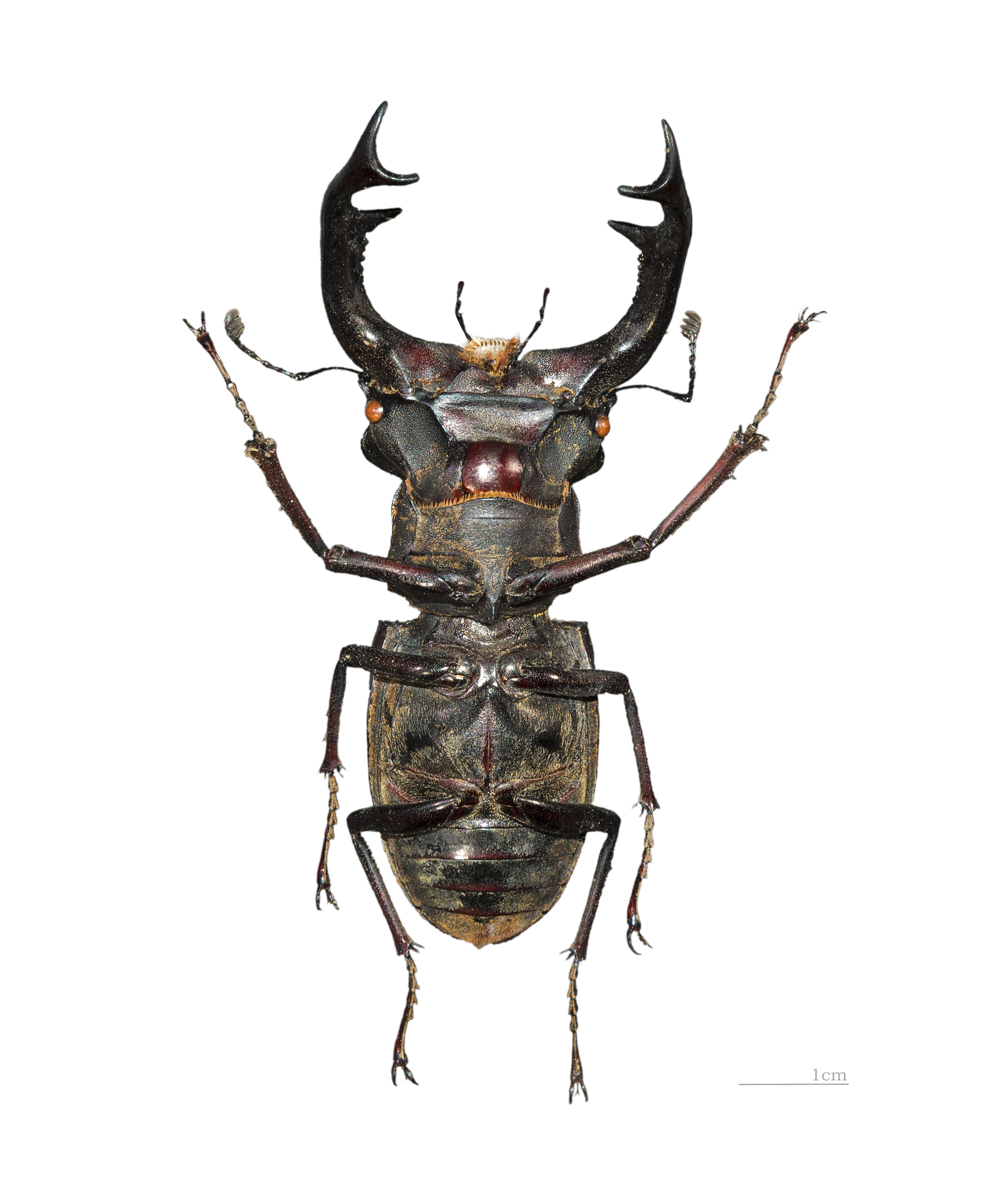
Underside

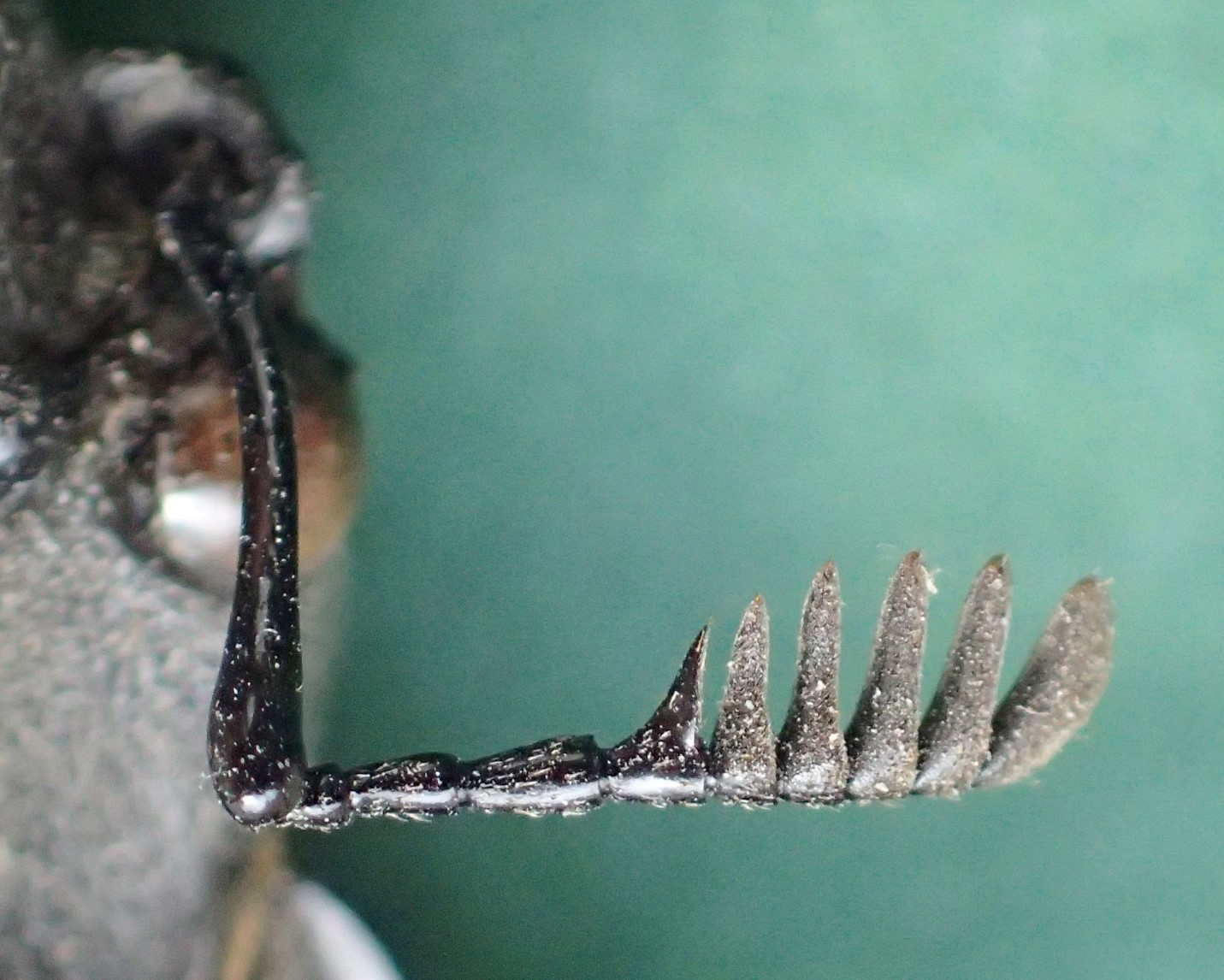
Antenna

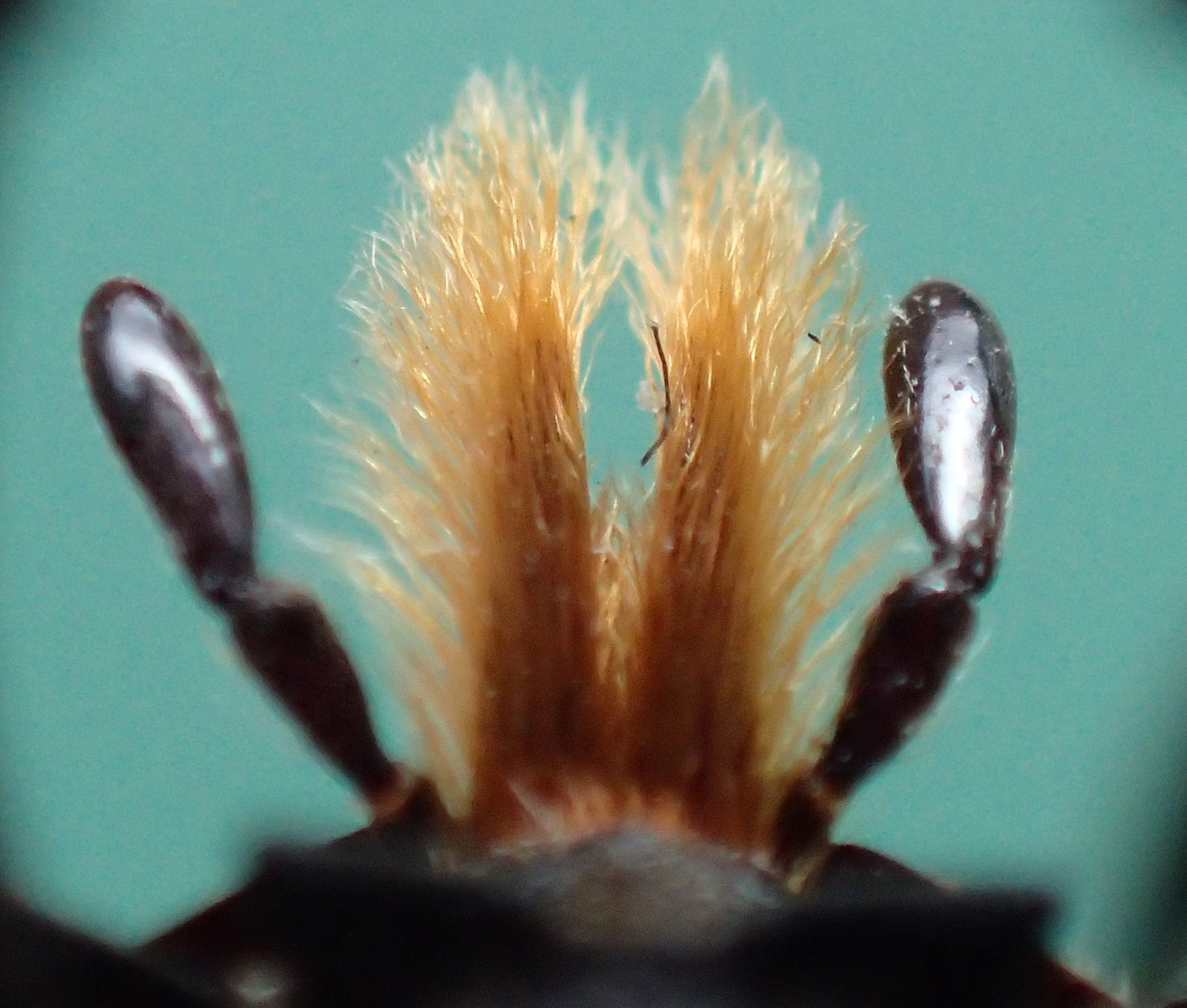
Mouthparts – the galea (feathery) and the labial palps

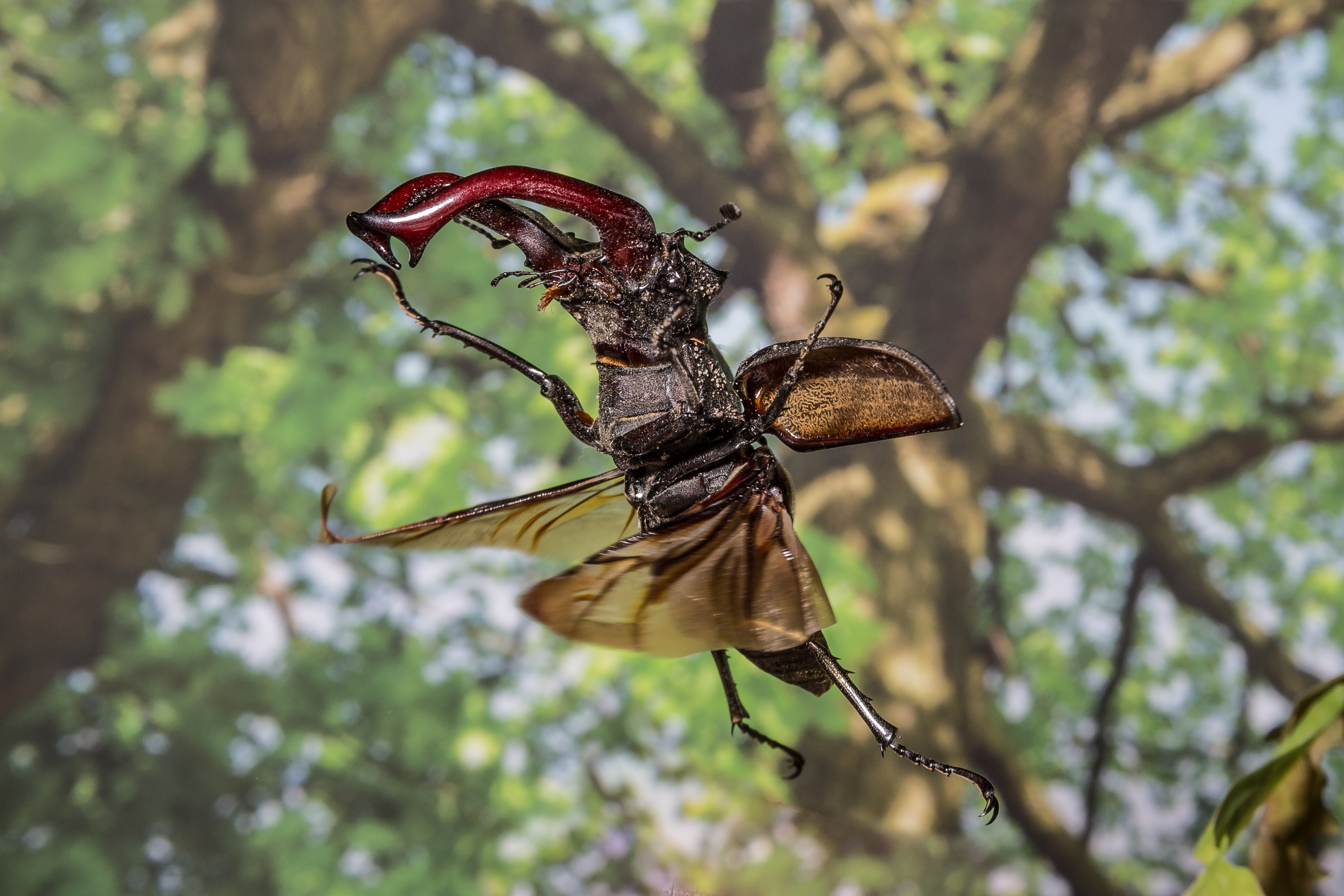
Flying

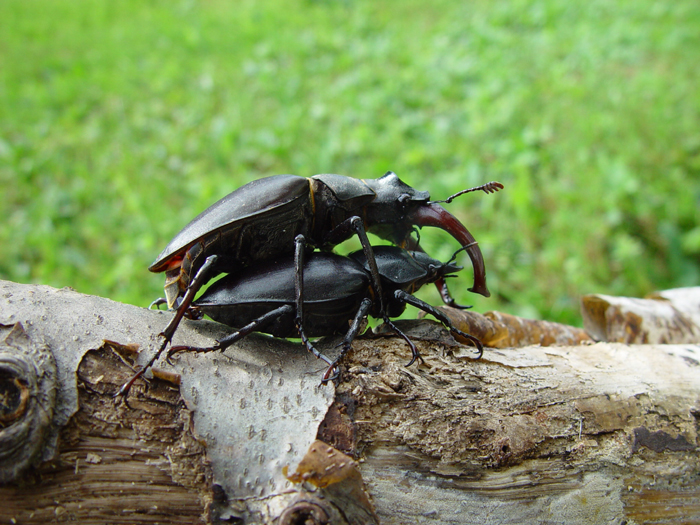
Mating

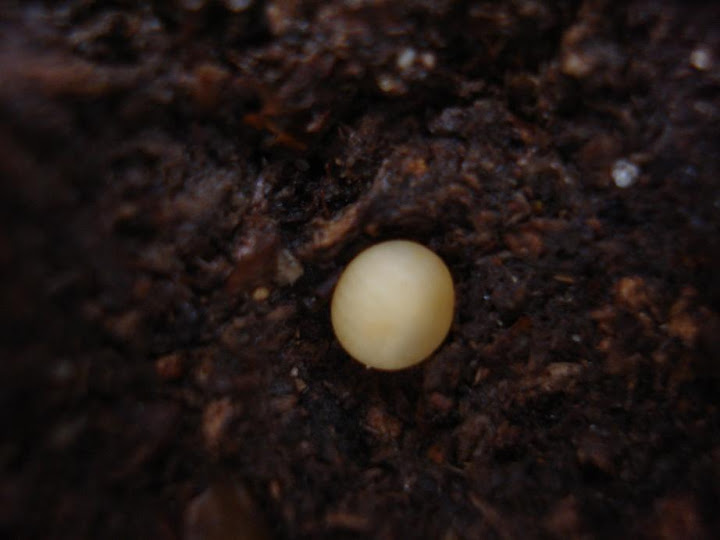
Egg

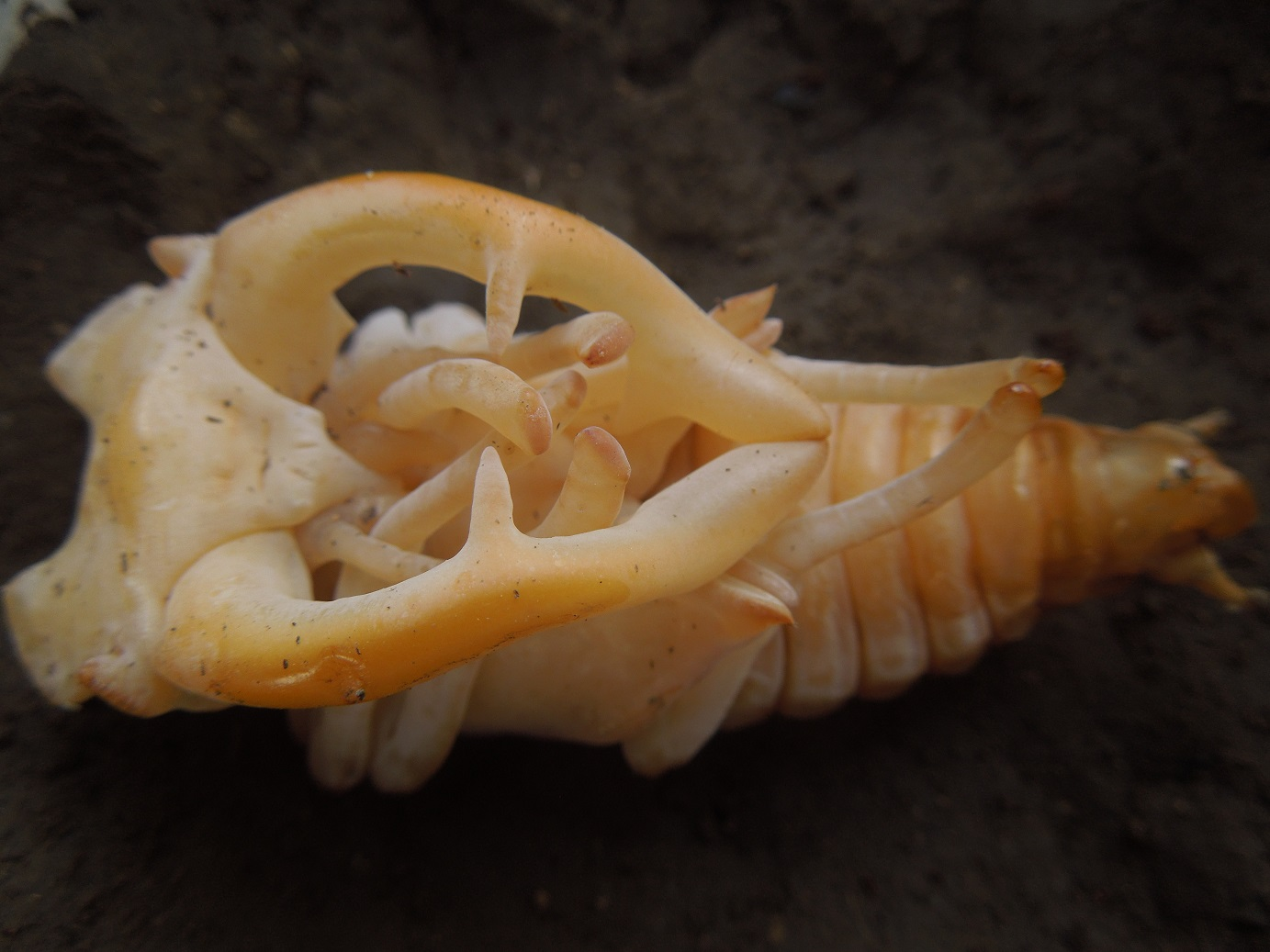
Pupa

Video of males fighting

Video of male flying
