= 1937 Nobel Prize in Literature =

- Roger Martin du Gard
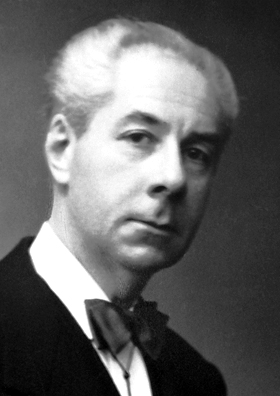
- "for the artistic power and truth with which he has depicted human conflict as well as some fundamental aspects of contemporary life in his novel-cycle Les Thibault."
- Date: 11 November 1937 (announcement); 10 December 1937 (ceremony)
- Location: Stockholm, Sweden
- Presented by: Swedish Academy
- First award: 1901
- Website: Official website

The 1937 Nobel Prize in Literature was awarded to the French author Roger Martin du Gard (1881–1958) "for the artistic power and truth with which he has depicted human conflict as well as some fundamental aspects of contemporary life in his novel-cycle Les Thibault".

== Laureate ==
Roger Martin du Gard was awarded for the then seven-part (a final eight part was later published) novel cycle Les Thibault (1922-1940), that chronicles a family of the bourgeoisie from the turn of the 19th century to World War I. His other work includes the novel Jean Barois (1913) that deals with the conflict between the Roman catholic faith of his childhood and the scientific materialism of his maturity and the impact of the Dreyfus affair on the protagonist, sketches of French country life in Vielle France ("Old France", 1933), a study of the author and his friend André Gide (Notes sur André Gide, 1951), and dramas.

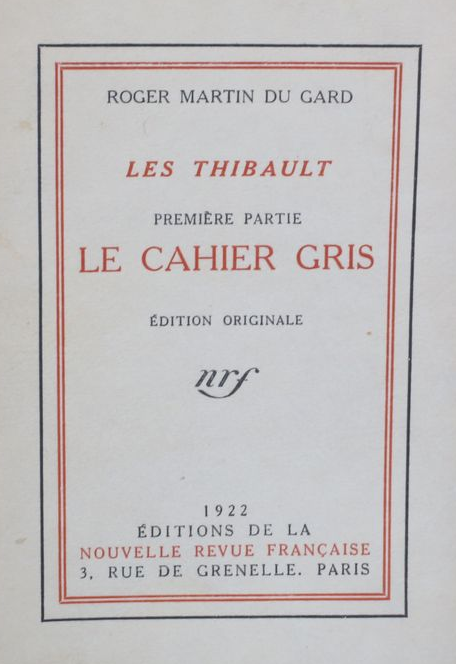
Du Gard's Les Thibault (1922–1940)

=== Les Thibault ===
The multi-volume roman-fleuve Les Thibault influenced the Nobel Committee in awarding Du Gard the 1937 Nobel Prize in Literature. It follows intricately the fortunes of two brothers, Antoine and Jacques Thibault, from their upbringing in a prosperous Catholic bourgeois family to the end of the First World War. The novel was admired by authors like André Gide, Albert Camus, Clifton Fadiman, and Georg Lukacs. In contrast, Mary McCarthy called it "a work whose learned obtuseness is, so far as I know, unequaled in fiction."

== Deliberations ==
=== Nominations ===
Roger Martin du Gard had been nominated for the prize five times since 1934. In 1937, the Nobel committee received 62 nominations for 37 writers including Frans Emil Sillanpää (awarded in 1939), Paul Valéry, Paul Claudel, Kostis Palamas, António Correia de Oliveira, Bertel Gripenberg, Karel Capek and Georges Duhamel. Fourteen were newly nominated such as Stijn Streuvels, Jean Giono, Johan Falkberget, Valdemar Rørdam and Albert Verwey. Most nominations were submitted for the Danish author Johannes V. Jensen (awarded in 1944) with seven nominations. There were seven female nominees namely Maria Madalena de Martel Patrício, Ricarda Huch, Ivana Brlić-Mažuranić, Maila Talvio, Maria Jotuni, Cecile Tormay and Sally Salminen.

The authors Lou Andreas-Salomé, J. M. Barrie, Ellis Parker Butler, Aleksey Chapygin, Ralph Connor, Francis de Croisset, Alberto de Oliveira, John Drinkwater, Florence Dugdale, Edward Garnett, Antonio Gramsci, Frances Nimmo Greene, Ivor Gurney, Elizabeth Haldane, Élie Halévy, W. F. Harvey, Ilya Ilf, Attila József, H. P. Lovecraft, Don Marquis, H. C. McNeile, Dashdorjiin Natsagdorj, Rudolf Otto, Mittie Frances Point (known as Mrs. Alex. McVeigh Miller), Horacio Quiroga, Jean-Joseph Rabearivelo and Yevgeny Zamyatin died in 1937 without having been nominated for the prize. The Dutch poet Albert Verwey died before the only chance to be rewarded.

Official list of nominees and their nominators for the prize
No.	Nominee	Country	Genre(s)	Nominator(s)
1	René Béhaine (1880–1966)	France	novel, short story, essays	Charles Bruneau (1883–1969); Émile Lasbax (1888–1966); François Dumas (1861–1948)
2	Ivana Brlić-Mažuranić (1874–1938)	Yugoslavia (Croatia)	novel, short story	Albert Bazala (1877–1947); Gavro Manojlović (1856–1939)
3	Paul Claudel (1868–1955)	France	poetry, drama, essays, memoir	Peter Hjalmar Rokseth (1891–1945)
4	António Correia de Oliveira (1878–1960)	Portugal	poetry	Luís da Cunha Gonçalvez (1875–1956)
5	Karel Čapek (1890–1938)	Czechoslovakia	drama, novel, short story, essays, literary criticism	Josef Šusta (1874–1945) (Note: Karel Čapek was also nominated by 9 other professors of history or literature at Prague University.)
6	Maria Madalena de Martel Patrício (1884–1947)	Portugal	poetry, essays	António Baião (1878–1961)
7	Roger Martin du Gard (1881–1958)	France	novel, drama, memoir	Torsten Fogelqvist (1880–1941)
8	Georges Duhamel (1884–1966)	France	novel, short story, poetry, drama, literary criticism	Hjalmar Hammarskjöld (1862–1953); Torsten Fogelqvist (1880–1941)
9	Olav Duun (1876–1939)	Norway	novel, short story	Helga Eng (1875–1966)
10	Johan Falkberget (1879–1967)	Norway	novel, short story, essays	Fredrik Paasche (1886–1943)
11	Jean Giono (1895–1970)	France	novel, short story, essays, poetry, drama	Léon Wencelius (1900–1971) (Note: Several thousand other nominations of Jean Giono were by ineligible nominators.); Marcel Cohen (1884–1974)
12	Bertel Gripenberg (1878–1947)	Finland; Sweden	poetry, drama, essays	Magnus Hammarström (1893–1941)
13	Vilhelm Grønbech (1873–1948)	Denmark	history, essays, poetry	William Norvin (1878–1940)
14	Jarl Hemmer (1893–1944)	Finland	poetry, novel	Hjalmar Hammarskjöld (1862–1953)
15	Ricarda Huch (1864–1947)	Germany	history, essays, novel, poetry	Hjalmar Hammarskjöld (1862–1953); Heinrich Wölfflin (1864–1945); Fritz Strich (1882–1963); 27 professors (Note: 27 professors from the universities of Bern, Basel, Geneva and Zürich in Switzerland, and Groningen, Netherlands.)
16	Johannes Vilhelm Jensen (1873–1950)	Denmark	novel, short story, essays	Vilhelm Andersen (1864–1953); Peter Skautrup (1896–1982); Ernst Frandsen (1894–1952); Francis Bull (1887–1974); Jens Thiis (1870–1942); Johannes Brøndum-Nielsen (1881–1977); Carl Adolf Bodelsen (1894–1978)
17	Maria Jotuni (1880–1943)	Finland	drama, novel, short story, essays	Viljo Tarkiainen (1879–1951)
18	Ludwig Klages (1872–1956)	Germany	philosophy, poetry, essays	Wilhelm Pinder (1878–1947)
19	Erwin Guido Kolbenheyer (1878–1962)	Austria	novel, short story, poetry, drama	Heinz Kindermann (1894–1985)
20	Maurice Magre (1877–1941)	France	novel, poetry, drama	Jules Marsan (1867–1939); Joseph Gheusi (1870–1950)
21	Bijay Chandra Majumdar (1861–1942)	India	essays	Sen Satyendranath (1909–1983)
22	John Masefield (1878–1967)	United Kingdom	poetry, drama, novel, short story, essays, autobiography	Anders Österling (1884–1981)
23	Dmitry Merezhkovsky (1865–1941)	Soviet Union	novel, essays, poetry, drama	Sigurd Agrell (1881–1937)
24	Kostis Palamas (1859–1943)	Greece	poetry, essays	Nikos Athanasiou Veēs (1882–1958)
25	Jules Payot (1859–1940)	France	pedagogy, philosophy	Alfred Baudrillart, C.O. (1859–1942)
26	William Pickard (1889–1973)	United Kingdom	novel, poetry, essays	Arthur Bernard Cook (1868–1952)
27	Sarvepalli Radhakrishnan (1888–1975)	India	philosophy, essays, law	Hjalmar Hammarskjöld (1862–1953)
28	Valdemar Rørdam (1872–1946)	Denmark	poetry, essays	Ejnar Thomsen (1897–1956)
29	Sally Salminen (1906–1976)	Finland	novel, essays, autobiography	Albert Engström (1869–1940)
30	Arnold Schering (1877–1941)	Germany	essays	Ilmari Krohn (1867–1960)
31	Frans Eemil Sillanpää (1888–1964)	Finland	novel, short story, poetry	15 Finnish professors and Academy members (Note: The nomination was made in 9 separate letters by 15 Finnish university professor and Academy members.); Juho Kusti Paasikivi (1870–1956); Yrjö Hirn (1870–1952)
32	Stijn Streuvels (1871–1969)	Belgium	novel, short story	5 professors from Belgian Universities; 64 university lecturers from Germany; Leo Goemans (1869–1955); Hans-Friedrich Rosenfeld (1899–1993)
33	Maila Talvio (1871–1951)	Finland	novel, short story, translation	Ilmari Krohn (1867–1960)
34	Shaul Tchernichovsky (1875–1943)	Soviet Union; Mandatory Palestine	poetry, essays, translation	Joseph Klausner (1874–1958)
35	Cécile Tormay (1875–1937)	Hungary	novel, short story, essays, translation	Jenö Pintér (1921–1988); János Horváth (1878–1961); Károly Pap (1897–1945); János Hankiss (1893–1959); Fredrik Böök (1883–1961)
36	Paul Valéry (1871–1945)	France	poetry, philosophy, essays, drama	Gabriel Hanotaux (1853–1944)
37	Albert Verwey (1865–1937)	Netherlands	poetry, essays, translation	Pieter Nicolaas van Eyck (1887–1954); Cornelis Gerrit Nicolaas de Vooys (1873–1955); Nicolaas Anthony Donkersloot (1902–1965)

== Prize decision ==
The main contenders for the 1937 Nobel Prize in Literature were Flemish Belgian writer Stijn Streuvels and French novelist Roger Martin du Gard. Three members of the Nobel committee advocated Streuvels and two advocated Martin du Gard. English writer John Masefield and a shared prize to Finnish writers Jarl Hemmer and Frans Eemil Sillanpää were also considered.

On 11 November 1937 the Swedish Academy decided that that year's Nobel Prize in Literature should be awarded to Roger Martin du Gard "for the artistic power and truth with which he has depicted human conflict as well as some fundamental aspects of contemporary life in his novel-cycle Les Thibault".
