= 1939 Nobel Prize in Literature =

- Frans Eemil Sillanpää
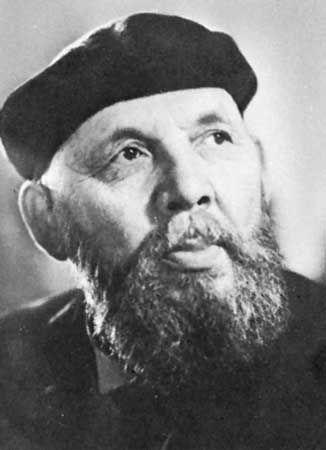
- "for his deep understanding of his country’s peasantry and the exquisite art with which he has portrayed their way of life and their relationship with Nature."
- Date: 10 November 1939 (announcement); 10 December 1939 (ceremony)
- Location: Stockholm, Sweden
- Presented by: Swedish Academy
- First award: 1901
- Website: Official website

The 1939 Nobel Prize in Literature was awarded to the Finnish writer Frans Eemil Sillanpää (1888–1964) "for his deep understanding of his country’s peasantry and the exquisite art with which he has portrayed their way of life and their relationship with Nature." He is the first and the only Finnish recipient of the prize.

== Laureate ==
Sillanpää made his literary debut with short stories published in newspaper Uusi Suomi in Helsinki. His first novel, Elämä ja aurinko ("Life and Sun", 1916), garnered recognition for its audacious portrayal of adolescent love while also employing a Darwinian method of character observation. His artistic works frequently referenced people as elemental entities. The novel Hurskas kurjuus ("Meek Heritage", 1919), depicts the crofter Juha Toivola's life and terrible end, and the revolt of the Finns during their civil war is explained. Sillanpää authored 10 collections of short stories in addition to seven novels, among them Nuorena nukkunut ("The Maid Silja", 1931) and Ihmiset suviyössä ("People in the Summer Night", 1934).

== Deliberations ==
=== Nominations ===
Sillanpää was nominated in 39 occasions since 1930. He received the highest number of nominations in 1938 with six nominations from literary critics and academics. In 1939, he received three nominations from a number of professors and members of Åbo Akademi University, University of Helsinki, and Finnish Academy of Science and Letters.

In total, the Nobel Committee of the Swedish Academy received 45 nominations. Ten of the nominees were newly elected such as Flávio de Carvalho, Herbert Samuel, Ethel Florence Richardson, Hugh Walpole, Johan Huizinga, Henriette Roland Holst, Maria Dąbrowska, and Hu Shih. The highest number of nominations was for the Danish author Johannes Vilhelm Jensen, who was awarded in 1944, with four nominations. Seven of the nominees were women namely Maria Dąbrowska, Maila Talvio, Henriette Charasson, Sally Salminen, Henriette Roland Holst, Ethel Florence Richardson, and Maria Madalena de Martel Patrício.

The authors Pedro Nolasco Cruz Vergara, Ethel M. Dell, Havelock Ellis, Ford Madox Ford, Ludwig Fulda, Agnes Giberne, Zane Grey, Richard Halliburton, Sidney Howard, Kyōka Izumi, Okamoto Kanoko, Vladislav Khodasevich, Volter Kilpi, Antonio Machado, Anton Makarenko, Leonard Merrick, Llewelyn Powys, Amanda McKittrick Ros, Joseph Roth, Edward Sapir, Caton Theodorian, Vũ Trọng Phụng, Amy Catherine Walton, William Drake Westervelt, William Huntington Wright (known as S. S. Van Dine), and Iris Guiver Wilkinson (known as Robin Hyde) died in 1939 without having been nominated for the prize.

Official list of nominees and their nominators for the prize
No.	Nominee	Country	Genre(s)	Nominator(s)
1	Mark Aldanov (1886–1957)	Soviet Union; France	biography, novel, essays, literary criticism	Ivan Bunin (1870–1953)
2	Eugène Baie (1874–1964)	Belgium	law, essays	Maurice Maeterlinck (1862–1949)
3	René Béhaine (1880–1966)	France	novel, short story, essays	Albert Feuillerat (1874–1952)
4	Henriette Charasson (1884–1972)	France	poetry, essays, drama, novel, literary criticism, biography	Albert Tessier (1895–1976); Serge Barrault (1887–1976); Jacques Chevalier (1882–1962)
5	Sanjib Kumar Chaudhuri (1902–)	India	law, philology	R. K. Danungo (–)
6	António Correia de Oliveira (1878–1960)	Portugal	poetry	Per Hallström (1866–1960)
7	Benedetto Croce (1866–1952)	Italy	history, philosophy, law	Johan Nordström (1891–1967); Bengt Hesselman (1875–1952)
8	Maria Dąbrowska (1889–1965)	Poland	novel, short story, essays, drama, literary criticism	Sten Bodvar Liljegren (1885–1984)
9	Flávio de Carvalho (1899–1973)	Brazil	drama, essays, memoir	Paul Vanorden Shaw (1898–1970)
10	Maria Madalena de Martel Patrício (1884–1947)	Portugal	poetry, essays	António Baião (1878–1961)
11	Olav Duun (1876–1939)	Norway	novel, short story	Harry Fett (1875–1962); Halvdan Koht (1873–1965)
12	Johan Falkberget (1879–1967)	Norway	novel, short story, essays	Eivind Berggrav (1884–1959); Fredrik Paasche (1886–1943); Richard Beck (1897–1980)
13	Hans Fallada (1893–1947)	Germany	novel, short story	Olle Holmberg (1893–1974)
14	Vilhelm Grønbech (1873–1948)	Denmark	history, essays, poetry	Sven Lönborg (1871–1959)
15	Jarl Hemmer (1893–1944)	Finland	poetry, novel	Hjalmar Hammarskjöld (1862–1953)
16	Hermann Hesse (1877–1962)	Germany; Switzerland	novel, poetry, essays, short story	Sigfrid Siwertz (1882–1970)
17	Hu Shih (1891–1962)	China	essays, philosophy, history, poetry, pedagogy	Sven Hedin (1865–1952)
18	Johan Huizinga (1872–1945)	Netherlands	history	4 members of the Royal Netherlands Academy of Arts and Sciences
19	Aldous Huxley (1894–1963)	United Kingdom	novel, short story, essays, poetry, screenplay, drama, philosophy	Torgny Segerstedt (1876–1945)
20	Johannes Vilhelm Jensen (1873–1950)	Denmark	novel, short story, essays	Sigurd Grieg (1894–1973); Carl Adolf Bodelsen (1894–1978); Jens Thiis (1870–1942); Vilhelm Andersen (1864–1953)
21	Josip Kosor (1879–1961)	Yugoslavia (Croatia)	novel, poetry, drama	Branko Popović (1882–1944)
22	Bijay Chandra Majumdar (1861–1942)	India	essays	Mukundadeb Chatterjee (–)
23	Ramón Menéndez Pidal (1869–1968)	Spain	philology, history	Hjalmar Hammarskjöld (1862–1953)
24	Egidio Poblete Escudero (1868–1940)	Chile	novel, short story, poetry, essays	Miguel Luís Amunátegui Reyes (1862–1949)
25	Ethel Florence Richardson (1870–1946)	Australia	novel, short story, memoir, translation	Sten Bodvar Liljegren (1885–1984)
26	Henriette Roland Holst (1869–1952)	Netherlands	poetry, essays, biography	Hjalmar Hammarskjöld (1862–1953)
27	Sally Salminen (1906–1976)	Finland	novel, essays, autobiography	Henrik Schück (1855–1947)
28	Herbert Samuel (1870–1963)	United Kingdom	philosophy, law, essays	Per Hallström (1866–1960)
29	Frans Eemil Sillanpää (1888–1964)	Finland	novel, short story, poetry	16 members of the Finnish Academy of Science and Letters; Heinrich Wolfgang Donner (1904-1980); Yrjö Hirn (1870–1952)
30	Stijn Streuvels (1871–1969)	Belgium	novel, short story	Fredrik Böök (1883–1961)
31	Maila Talvio (1871–1951)	Finland	novel, short story, translation	Veikko Antero Koskenniemi (1885–1962)
32	Paul Valéry (1871–1945)	France	poetry, philosophy, essays, drama	Sten Bodvar Liljegren (1885–1984); Ernst Bendz (1880–1966)
33	Hugh Walpole (1884–1941)	United Kingdom	novel, short story, drama, memoir	Sten Bodvar Liljegren (1885–1984)

== Prize decision ==
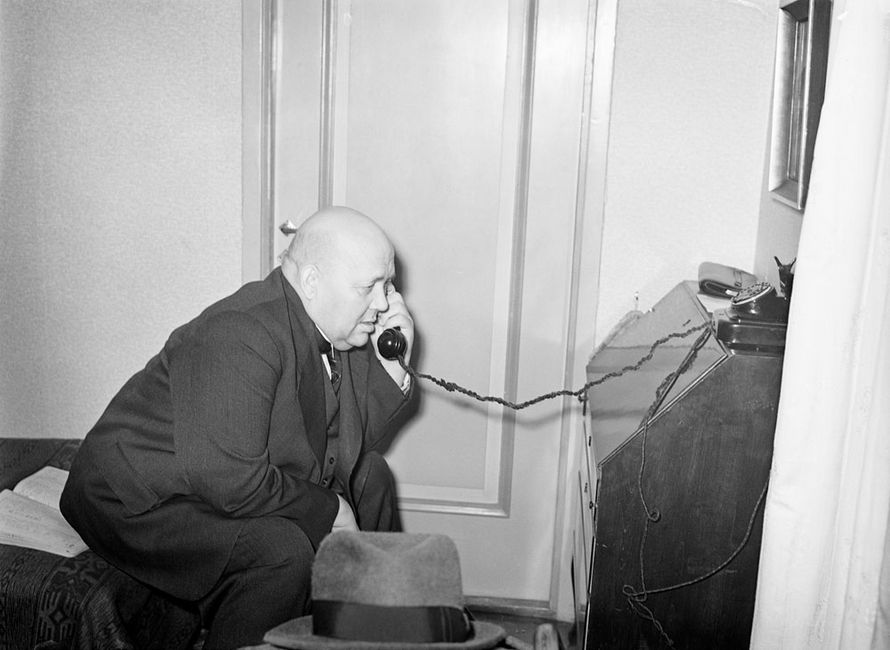
F.E. Sillanpää in his home receives the news that he has been awarded with the Nobel Prize in Literature in 1939.

In the Nobel committee's report to the Swedish Academy dated 21 September 1939, the candidacy of the eventually awarded Frans Eemil Sillanpää was rejected by the committee: "Despite all appreciation of the author's extraordinary style and ability to portray has not been able to grant him enough scope and power in the portrayal of people and narrative imagination to defend the proposed award of the Nobel Prize. Some of the Committee members have valued him much higher, and even among the other members of the Academy there has been no lack of support for the proposal. However, a majority in favor of this has not yet been achieved. The Committee does not wish to recommend the proposal at present."

Recommended candidates for the 1939 prize were the Dutch historian Johan Huizinga, German poet and novelist Hermann Hesse and Flemish Belgian writer Stijn Streuvels. There were equal support in the committee for Huizinga and Hesse, two members, Hjalmar Hammarskjöld and Per Hallström, advocated a prize to Huizinga, two members, Anders Österling and Torsten Fogelqvist, advocated Hesse, while the fifth member Fredrik Böök proposed Streuvels.

In a separate report, Hammarskjöld argued for Huizinga's candidacy: "In my opinion, the Academy has rarely had to take a position on a candidacy that so closely corresponded to the founder's intentions and at the same time had current interest". Hammarskjöld also stated that he opposed Hesse's candidacy: "I find myself completely unable to contribute to a Nobel Prize for an author whose main and most notable production is of such a degrading and — to use an expression that fortunately probably lacks a full equivalent in the Swedish language — morbid character as Hesse's." Hallström commented that "However much [Hesse] wins the reader's heart, he cannot be called a poet of truly great proportions". Österling and Fogelqvist, on the other hand, argued that the current times was the right time to award Hesse as an "apolitical writer and at the same time a worthy and sympathetically original representative of the repressed but lingering humanism."

On 10 November 1939 the Swedish Academy decided that that year's Nobel Prize in Literature should be awarded to the Finnish author Frans Eemil Sillanpää "for his deep understanding of his country’s peasantry and the exquisite art with which he has portrayed their way of life and their relationship with Nature."

It has been speculated that Sillanpää was awarded for political reasons rather than for his literary merits, but documents show that the 1939 conflict between Finland and the Soviet Union was not mentioned in the deliberations by the Nobel committee.

Hermann Hesse was subsequently awarded the 1946 Nobel Prize in Literature.

== Aftermath ==
A few days after he received the prize, talks between Finland and Soviet Union broke down and the Winter War began. Sillanpää donated the golden medal to be melted for funds to aid the war effort.
