= 1930 Nobel Prize in Literature =

Award

- Sinclair Lewis
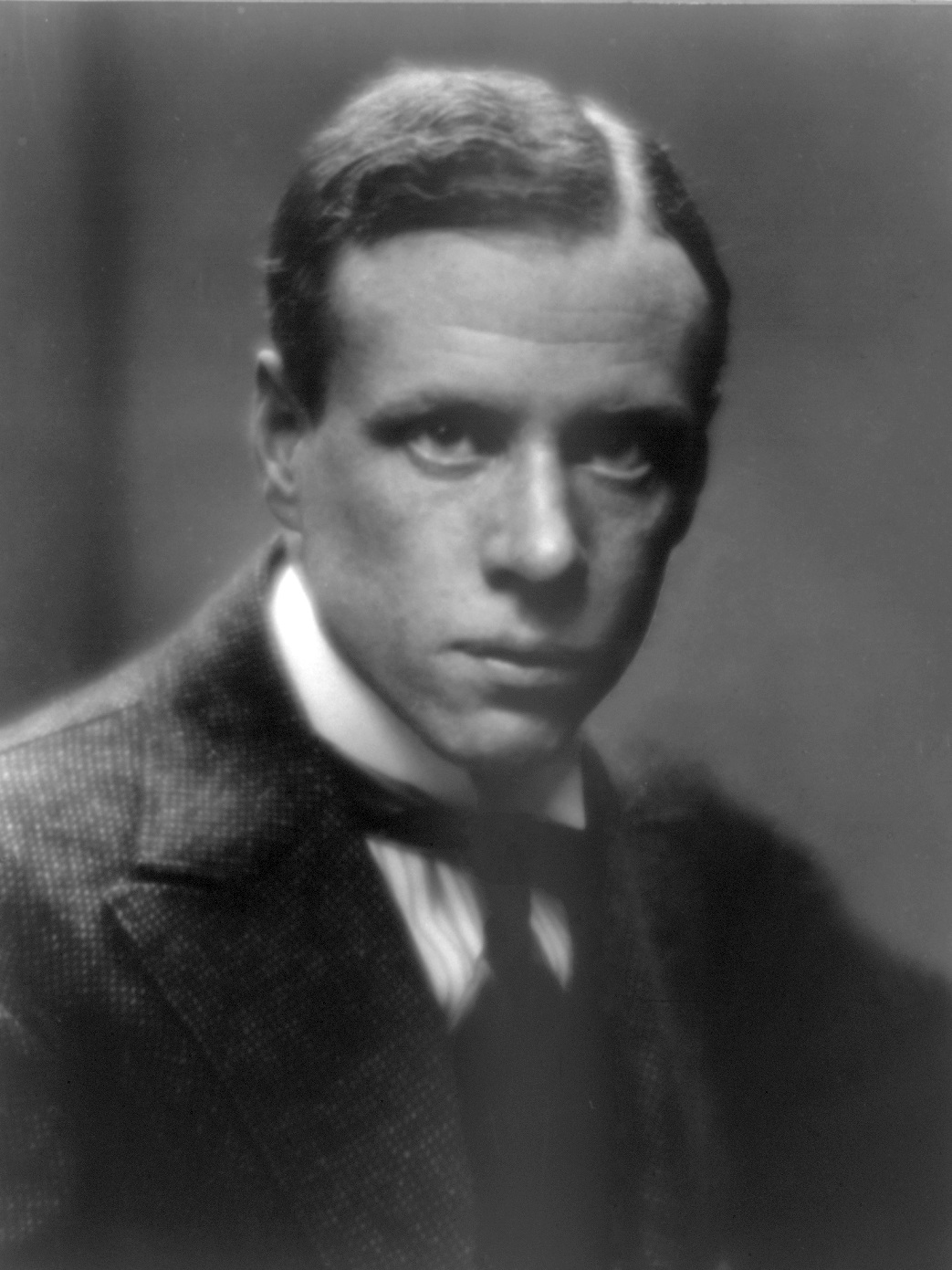
- "for his vigorous and graphic art of description and his ability to create, with wit and humour, new types of characters."
- Date: 5 November 1930 (announcement); 10 December 1930 (ceremony)
- Location: Stockholm, Sweden
- Presented by: Swedish Academy
- First award: 1901
- Website: Official website

The 1930 Nobel Prize in Literature was awarded to American novelist Sinclair Lewis (1885–1951) "for his vigorous and graphic art of description and his ability to create, with wit and humour, new types of characters." He is the first American Nobel laureate in literature.

== Laureate ==
Sinclair Lewis was a prolific author having written 24 novels, more than 70 short stories, several plays and poetry collections. He is well known for the satirical novels Main Street (1920), Babbitt (1922), Dodsworth (1929), and It Can't Happen Here (1935) – all of which critical acknowledgments of American capitalism and materialism in the interwar period. His 1920 novel became a commercial success but did not win a Pulitzer Prize, which disappointed Lewis much that he declined the Pulitzer Prize when it was awarded to his novel Arrowsmith in 1925.

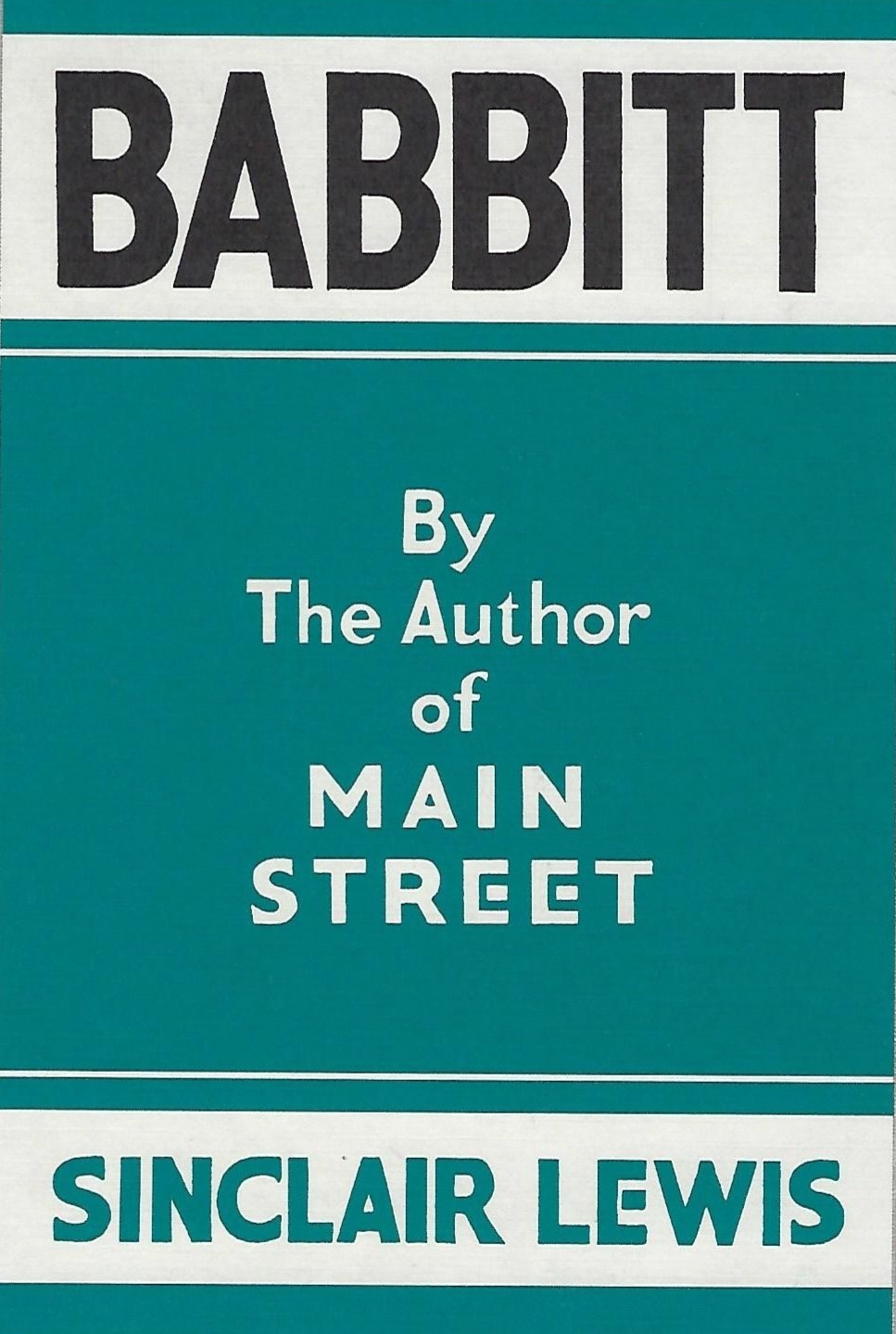
Dust jacket for the first edition of Sinclair Lewis' novel Babbitt.

== Deliberations ==
=== Nominations ===
Lewis had not been nominated before for the prize, making him one of the laureates who won on a rare occasion when they have been awarded the Nobel Prize in Literature the same year they were first nominated. He received only one nomination from Swedish Academy member Henrik Schück (1855–1947).

In total, the Swedish Academy's Nobel Committee received 47 nominations for 30 writers. Thirteen of the authors were first-time nominated among them Theodore Dreiser, Edgar Lee Masters, Frans Eemil Sillanpää (awarded in 1939), Arvid Järnefelt, Paul Valéry, Lion Feuchtwanger, Rudolf Kassner, and Clotilde Crespo de Arvelo. The highest number of nomination was for the French poet and essayist Paul Valéry with six nominations. There were three female nominees: Concha Espina de la Serna, Clotilde Crespo de Arvelo and Edith Wharton.

The authors Arthur St John Adcock, Vladimir Arsenyev, Florence Bell, Edward Bok, Alice Williams Brotherton, Mary Whiton Calkins, Herbert Croly, Georges de Porto-Riche, Arthur Conan Doyle, Florbela Espanca, Mary Eleanor Wilkins Freeman, Thomas Nicoll Hepburn, Pavlos Karolidis, D. H. Lawrence, William John Locke, Vladimir Mayakovsky, Olena Pchilka, Maria Polydouri, Marion Manville Pope, George Haven Putnam, Karam Singh, Arthur Way, Lucien Wolf, Joseph Wright, Gabriel Miró and Manuel Zeno Gandía died in 1930 without having been nominated for the prize.

Official list of nominees and their nominators for the prize
No.	Nominee	Country	Genre(s)	Nominator(s)
1	Rudolf Hans Bartsch (1873–1952)	Austria	novel, short story, essays, drama	Alfons Dopsch (1868–1953); Alfred Francis Pribram (1859–1942)
2	Rufino Blanco Fombona (1874–1844)	Venezuela	essays, literary criticism	José Francos Rodríguez (1862–1931)
3	Georg Bonne (1859–1945)	Germany	essays	Prince Maximilian of Saxony (1870–1951) (Note: The nomination was corroborated by a number of German professors.)
4	Ivan Bunin (1870–1953)	Soviet Union	short story, novel, poetry	Sigurd Agrell (1881–1937)
5	Clotilde Crespo de Arvelo (1887–1959)	Venezuela	novel, poetry, essays	Manuel María Villalobos (1858–1929)
6	Theodore Dreiser (1871–1945)	United States	novel, drama, poetry, essays	Anders Österling (1884–1981)
7	Hans Driesch (1867–1941)	Germany	philosophy	Arnošt Kraus (1859–1943); Fritz Kern (1884–1950); Walter Goetz (1867–1958); Kurt Breysig (1866–1940)
8	Olav Duun (1876–1939)	Norway	novel, short story	Halvdan Koht (1873–1965)
9	Paul Ernst (1866–1933)	Germany	novel, short story, drama, essays	Robert Faesi (1883–1972); Edmund Stengel (1845–1935); Gustav Neckel (1878–1940)
10	Concha Espina de la Serna (1869–1955)	Spain	novel, short story	Gabriel Boussagol (1882–1970); Fredrik Wulff (1845–1930)
11	Édouard Estaunié (1862–1942)	France	novel, literary criticism	Erik Staaff (1867–1936)
12	Lion Feuchtwanger (1884–1958)	Germany	novel, drama	Ulrik Anton Motzfeldt (1871–1942)
13	Bertel Gripenberg (1878–1947)	Finland; Sweden	poetry, drama, essays	Johannes Sundwall (1877–1966)
14	Yrjö Hirn (1870–1952)	Finland	essays, literary criticism	Olaf Homén (1879–1949)
15	Arvid Järnefelt (1861–1932)	Finland	law, essays, drama	Oiva Tuulio (1878–1941)
16	Alois Jirásek (1851–1930)	Czechoslovakia	novel, drama	Jan Bedřich Novák (1872–1933); Josef Zubatý (1855–1931)
17	Rudolf Kassner (1873–1959)	Austria	philosophy, essays, translation	Friedrich Gundolf (1880–1931); Walther Brecht (1876–1950); Arnold Meyer (1861–1934)
18	Karl Kraus (1874–1936)	Austria	essays, drama, poetry	Charles Andler (1866–1933)
19	Manfred Kyber (1880–1933)	Germany	drama, short story, poetry, essays, literary criticism	Prince Maximilian of Saxony (1870–1951); Ludwig Quidde (1858–1941)
20	Sinclair Lewis (1885–1951)	United States	novel, short story, drama, poetry	Henrik Schück (1855–1947)
21	Edgar Lee Masters (1868–1950)	United States	poetry, biography, drama, novel, essays	Martin Lamm (1880–1950)
22	Dmitry Merezhkovsky (1865–1941)	Soviet Union	novel, essays, poetry, drama	Sigurd Agrell (1881–1937) (Note: S. Agrell proposed that the Prize be awarded either solely to Dmitry Merezhkovsky, or shared with Ivan Bunin.)
23	Kostis Palamas (1859–1943)	Greece	poetry, essays	Verner von Heidenstam (1859–1940); Simos Menardos (1872–1933)
24	Edwin Arlington Robinson (1869–1935)	United States	poetry, drama	Hjalmar Hammarskjöld (1862–1953)
25	Johann Rump (1871–1949) (pseud. Nathanael Jünger)	Germany	theology, essays	Fredrik Wulff (1845–1930)
26	Frans Eemil Sillanpää (1888–1964)	Finland	novel, short story, poetry	Werner Söderhjelm (1859–1931); Yrjö Hirn (1870–1952); Oiva Tuulio (1878–1941)
27	Paul Valéry (1871–1945)	France	poetry, philosophy, essays, drama	Maurice Paléologue (1859–1944); Jules Cambon (1845–1935); Henri Bergson (1859–1949); Raymond Poincaré (1860–1934); Gabriel Hanotaux (1853–1944); Gustave Cohen (1879–1958)
28	Ernst von der Recke (1848–1933)	Denmark	poetry, drama	Johannes Steenstrup (1844–1935); 8 members of the Royal Danish Academy of Sciences and Letters
29	Edith Wharton (1862–1937)	United States	novel, short story, poetry, essays	Tor Hedberg (1862–1931)
30	Anton Wildgans (1881–1932)	Austria	poetry, drama	Oswald Redlich (1858–1944) (Note: Anton Wildgans was also nominated by a number of professors at the University in Vienna, Austria, who were eligible to nominate a candidate.)

== Prize decision ==
The main contenders for the 1930 prize were the American novelists Theodore Dreiser and Sinclair Lewis, who had both been nominated by members of the Swedish Academy's Nobel committee. Committee chair Per Hallström opposed a prize to an American author as he found that the contemporary American culture lacked the deeper ideals and "inner dignity" of the European culture, but got no support for this view within the Nobel committee. Hallström had found in his examinations of the two candidates that they had really only written one significant work each, An American Tragedy and Babbit, but noted that Lewis' most recent novel Dodsworth was also "partly brilliant", which seems to have been decisive in the Swedish Academy's decision to award Lewis. Committee member Anders Österling who favoured Dreiser unsuccessfully argued that the prize should be shared between the two authors.

== Reactions ==
The choice of Sinclair Lewis received mixed reactions. The British and European press were, in general, favourable. A Swedish newspaper stated that the prize decision was greeted with "general satisfaction", as the Swedish Academy for once had awarded a writer that was well known to the public. But in the United States reactions among critics and commentators were largely negative, dismissing Lewis' writing artistically and politically. Lewis rivalry with the American Nobel prize contender Theodore Dreiser was much noticed.

== Award ceremony ==
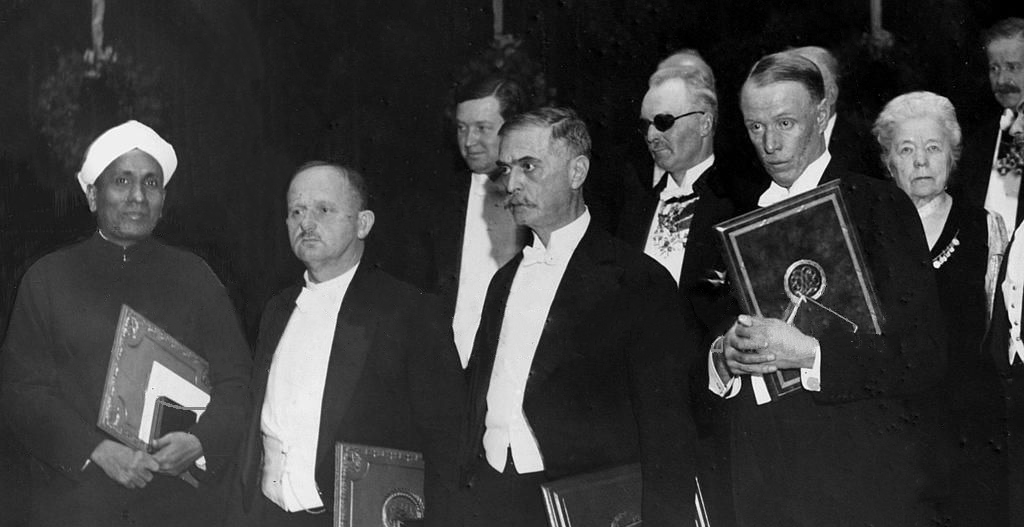
Sinclair Lewis (right) at the award ceremony in Stockholm on 10 December 1930.

At the award ceremony Erik Axel Karlfeldt, permanent secretary of the Swedish Academy, gave a speech in praise of Sinclair Lewis:

The new great American literature has started with national self-criticism. It is a sign of health. Sinclair Lewis has the blessed gift of wielding his landclearing implement not only with a firm hand but with a smile on his lips and youth in his heart. He has the manners of a new settler, who takes new land into cultivation. He is a pioneer.

At the banquet, Tor Hedberg of the Swedish Academy addressed Sinclair Lewis and said:

In your person we greet that [American] new building on its own American ground. It has been said that the Nobel Prize in Literature has found its way across the Atlantic far too late. If so, it has not been due to any indifference on the part of the Swedish Academy, nor to any lack of knowledge, but rather to an «embarras de richesse». (...) It is with living humour that you aim the blows of your scourge, and where there is humour, there is a heart too. It is not only the keen and lively intellect, the masterly design of human shapes and characters but also the warm, open, gaily-beating heart that we have appreciated in you.
