= SP-Arte =

Brazilian art fair

São Paulo's International Art Fair, or SP-Arte for short, is a Latin American art fair that has annually showcased works from internationally recognized institutions, galleries, and art professionals at the Oscar Niemeyer Biennial Pavilion since 2005. It features sections for old and contemporary art, site-specific installations, and experimental works alongside a program of talks and city-wide cultural events.

== History ==
SP-Arte was founded in 2005 by lawyer and art collector Fernanda Feitosa. Feitosa has stated her inspiration stemmed "from the realization that Brazil, like other countries in the world that had consolidated art fairs, had a set of characteristics that are indicative of a good market: it is a large and central country in the South American region, with a very professional local art market, high-quality artistic production and a high potential for growth in the art consumer market. All this points to the creation of an attractive and successful event with a strong impact on the community, like the international art fairs Art Basel, Frieze or ARCO."

Adriano Pedrosa, artistic director of MASP, was in charge of the Curatorial Laboratory from 2012 to 2014, an initiative that encouraged young curators to develop exhibition projects within the fair and which included the participation of Marta Mestre, Bernardo Mosqueira, Tomás Toledo and Fernando Oliva.

SP-Arte also organised artist residencies in partnership with other institutions: Delfina Foundation, in London, UK; Instituto Inclusartiz, in Rio de Janeiro; Kaaysá Art Residency, in São Sebastião; Residency Unlimited, in New York, USA; FLORA ars+natura in Tolima, Colombia.

SP-Arte Circuit is an itinerary that includes open studios, talks with artists, and exhibition openings in the month of the fairs. Art and design galleries, independent spaces and studios participating in the event create a program that is open to the public.

== SP-Arte Brasília ==
In 2014, SP-Arte held an edition of the fair in Brasília, hosting 35 national galleries at the Iguatemi Brasília shopping center as the first edition of SP-Arte outside São Paulo.Galleries from Bahia, Minas Gerais, Paraná, Rio de Janeiro and São Paulo participated.

== SP-Foto ==
In addition to the main SP-Arte event, between 2007 and 2019 SP-Foto took place.The event was held in August, corresponding to Photography Month in Brazil. The fair was initially held at the Iguatemi shopping mall and then moved to the JK Iguatemi shopping mall, both in São Paulo, hosting 44 exhibitors in its latest edition, including national and international galleries. These editions also featured meetings between curators, artists, and galleries and guided tours by experts. In 2022, the event expanded and became SP-Arte Rotas Brasileiras.

== SP-Arte Brazilian Routes ==
In 2022, SP-FOTO became SP-Arte Rotas Brasileiras, which focuses on selected individual and collective projects. The fair focuses on strengthening ties between artists, galleries, and institutions in and diversity of artistic production. SP-Arte Rotas Brasileiras takes place annually at ARCA, a 1940s industrial shed located in Vila Leopoldina, accompanied by a program of talks, editorial launches, and other events.

== Casa SP-Arte ==
In March 2023, Casa SP-Arte was founded in São Paulo as a permanent space whose purpose is to host exhibitions by partner galleries and events. The space occupies one of the residences designed by artist and architect Flávio de Carvalho (1899–1973) for Vila Modernista, in Jardins. The exhibition Hélio Oiticica: mundo-labirinto, in partnership with Gomide&Co, opened the program at the venue.
