= Heule =

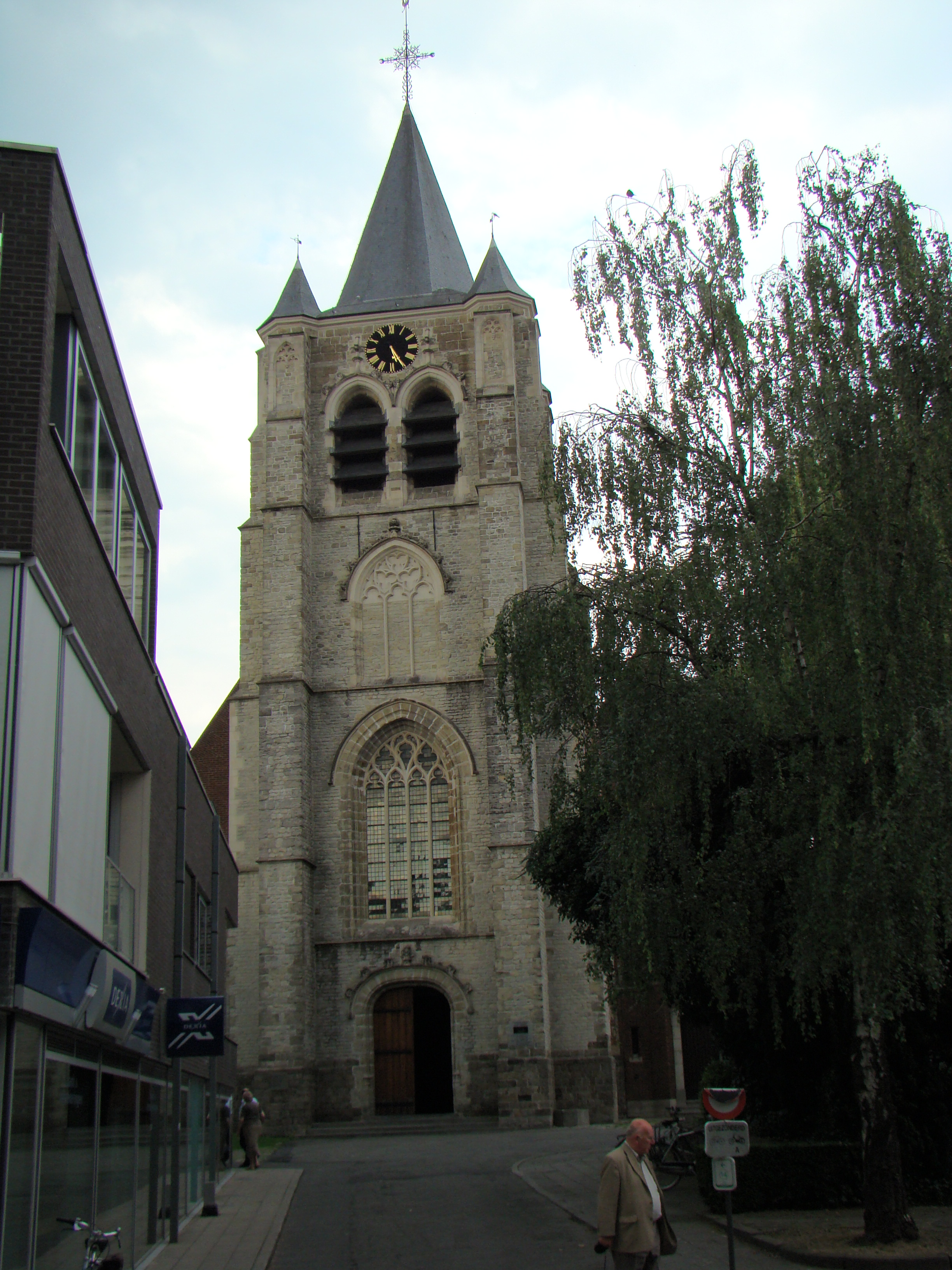
- The Sint-Eutropiuskerk in Heule

- Location in Belgium
- Coordinates: 50°50′N 3°14′E
- Country: Belgium
- Province: West Flanders
- Municipality: Kortrijk

Area
  - Total: 4.51 sq mi (11.68 km^{2})

Population (2009)
  - Total: 10,503
- Time zone: UTC+1 (CET)
  - Summer (DST): UTC+2 (CEST)
- 8501: 8501
- Area code: 056
- Website: www.kortrijk.be

Heule is a submunicipality of the city of Kortrijk in the Belgian province of West Flanders. The first notion of this settlement dates of the year 1111. Heule has a surface of 1169h and has a population of 10,503 (2009).

Surrounding villages of Heule are Bissegem, Gullegem, Lendelede and Kuurne. Between Kuurne, Lendelede and Heule there's also the settlement Sente (Saint-Katherine)

== Name ==
It's said that the city's name is derived from the current that runs through Heule, namely the Heulebeek. Another opinion is that it's derived from the words geul or geule which is the ditch in which the current flows.

== Sights ==
- In the public garden there's a set of tree rare baldcypresses (Taxodium distichum).
- The Preetjes Molen, the only flax attrition mill in Europe, can be found in Heule.
- Until 2001, the Curiosamuseum founded by Antoon Vanneste was established in the Peperstraat.

== Culture ==
The popular song 'Tineke van Heule' owes its name to the village. Every year in the second weekend of September, the Tinekesfeesten are organized in the village. Also the ward Heule-Watermolen organizes these elections of Tineke.

In Heule, the famous Flemish writer Stijn Streuvels (Franciscus Petrus Maria (Frank) Lateur) was born on the third of October in the year 1871. A memorial stone was set up in the Kortrijkstraat. Several wards in Heule have got the name of one of his famous works, like de Vlaschaard, Zomertij, Najaar en Winterland.

== Well-known people from Heule ==
- Stijn Streuvels (1871–1969), writer
- Gerard Debaets (1899), cyclist
- Michel en Gaston-Octave Debaets, cyclists and brothers of Gerard Debaets.
- Alois Vansteenkiste (1928–1991), cyclist
- Lucien De Muynck (1931), athlete
- Lieven Bertels (1971)
- Christian Goethals (1928–2003), racing driver
