= Rogier van Otterloo =

Dutch composer and conductor

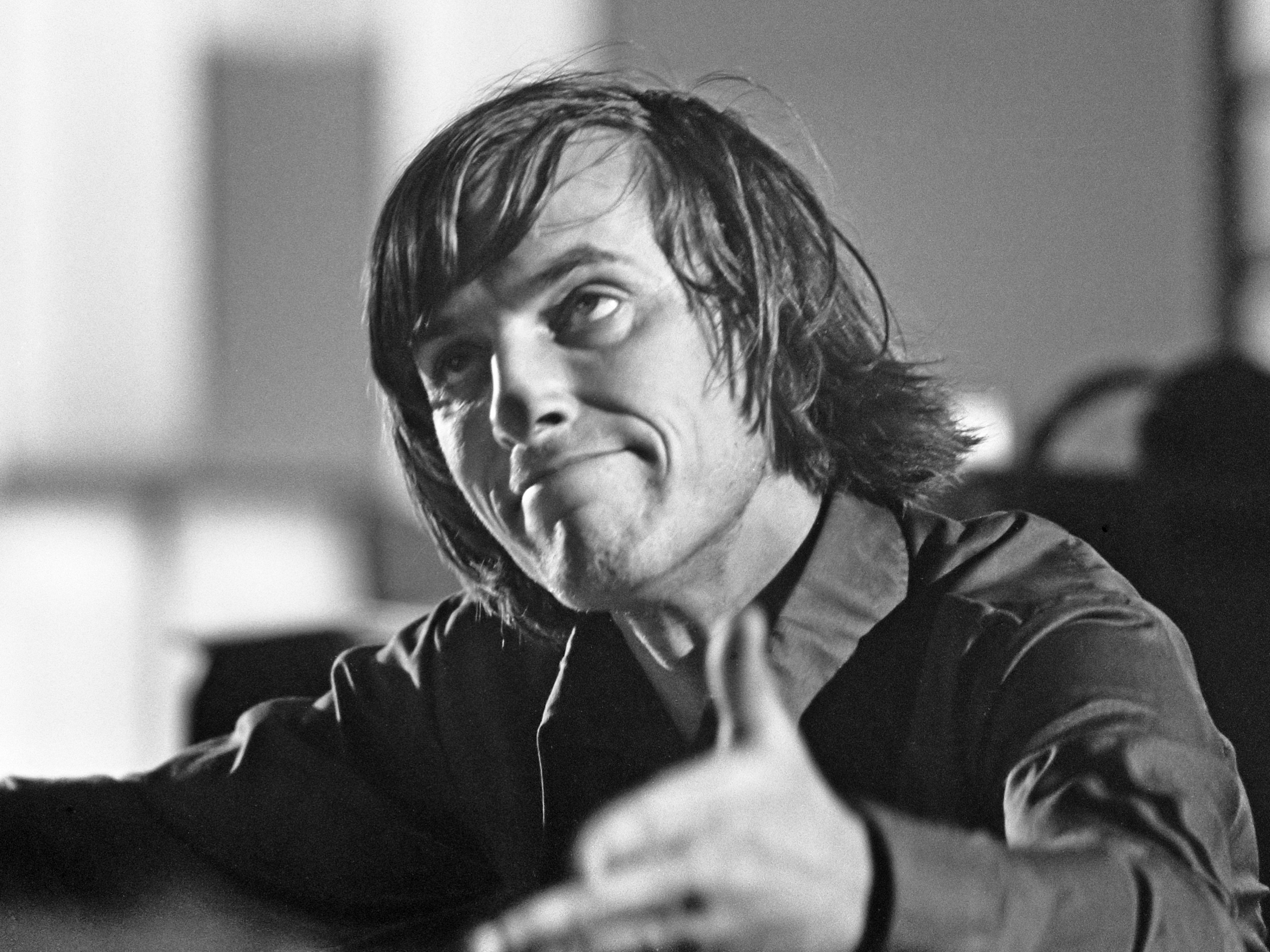
- Otterloo in 1975

Background information
- Born: Willem Rogier van Otterloo; 11 December 1941; Bilthoven, Netherlands
- Died: 29 January 1988 (aged 46) Bilthoven, Netherlands
- Genres: Jazz, Jazz fusion, Classical music
- Occupations: Composer, conductor
- Years active: 1973–1988

Willem Rogier van Otterloo (11 December 1941 – 29 January 1988) was a Dutch composer and conductor.

== Biography ==
Van Otterloo was the eldest son of the conductor Willem van Otterloo, and was born in Bilthoven, Netherlands. He composed several soundtracks for Dutch films and in 1980 became conductor of the Metropole Orkest for jazz music in Amsterdam. He conducted five Dutch entries in Eurovision Song Contests: "Amsterdam" (1980), "Het is een wonder" (1981), "Jij en ik" (1982), "Ik hou van jou" (1984) and "Rechtop in de wind" (1987). He has also composed jazz music.

He died from mesothelioma in Bilthoven in 1988.

== Discography ==
- 'Turks Fruit' 1973
- 'Visions' 1974
- 'Lets Go To Randstad/Randstad Reflection' 1974
- 'Munich 74' 1974
- 'On The Move' 1976
- 'Moods' 1976
- 'The French Collection' 1976
- 'Heartbeat/Farewell Song' 1976
- 'Soldaat van Oranje' 1977
- 'Tin Pan Alley' 1978
- 'Wereldsuccessen' 1978
- 'Juliana 70' 1979
- 'Grijpstra en de Gier'1979
- 'Collage' 1980
- 'First In The Air' 1984
- 'Silver Selection' 1985
- 'Verzameld Werk' 2005

== Filmography ==
- Turks Fruit (1973)
- De vloek van Woestewolf (1974)
- Help, de dokter verzuipt! (1974)
- Keetje Tippel (1975)
- Soldaat van Oranje (1977)
- Grijpstra & De Gier (1979)
- Vrijdag (1981)
- Te Gek Om Los te Lopen (1981)
- De Vlaschaard (1983)
- Op hoop van zegen (1986)

Media offices
Preceded by (Israel) Izhak Graziani	Eurovision Song Contest conductor 1980	Succeeded by (Republic of Ireland) Noel Kelehan
