= Wilhelm Agrell =

Swedish writer and historian (born 1950)

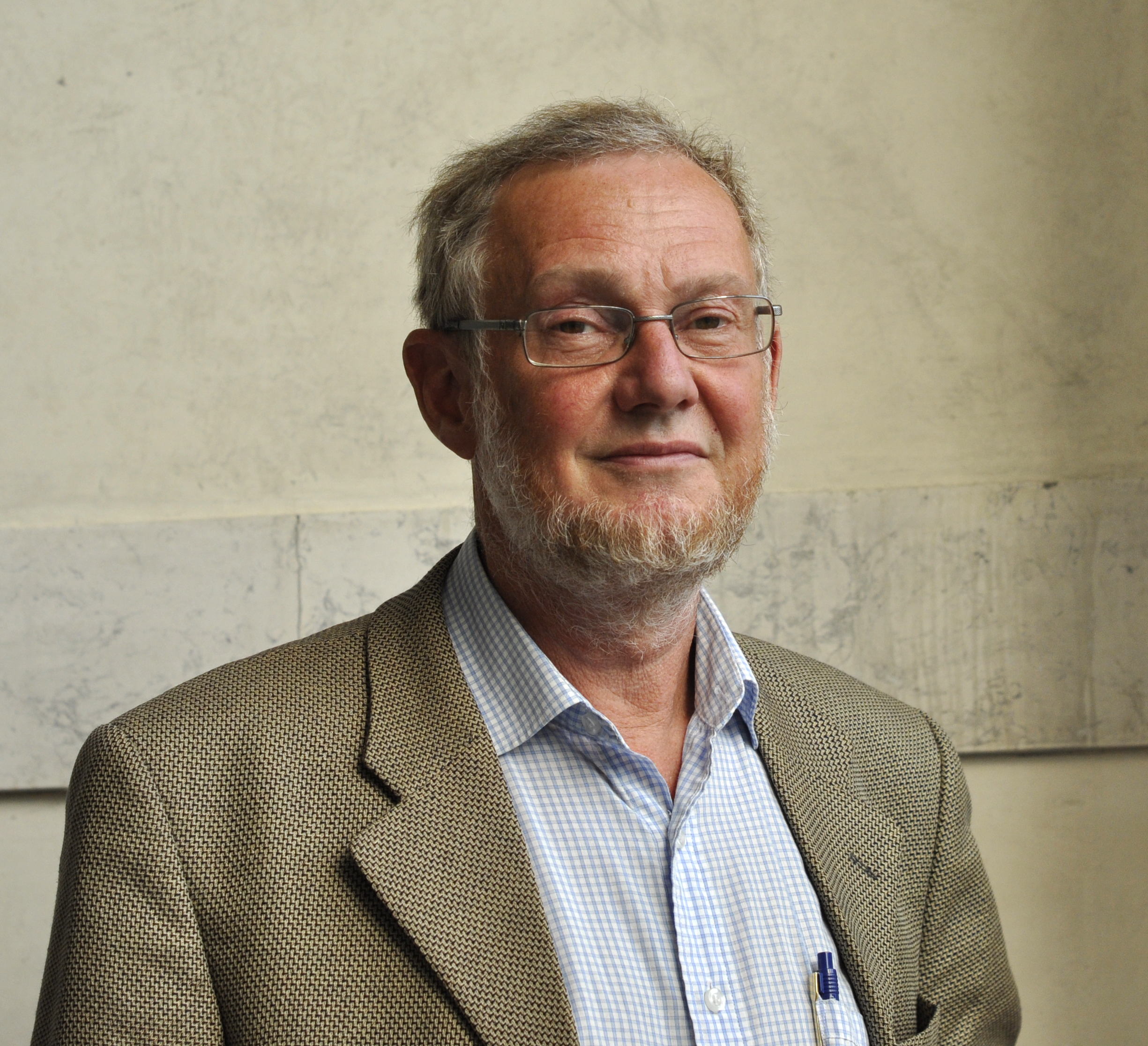
- Born: Hans Wilhelm Kristofer Agrell; October 13, 1950 (age 75); Uppsala, Sweden
- Education: Stockholm University
- Occupation: Professor of intelligence analysis
- Relatives: Sigurd Agrell (grandfather)

Hans Wilhelm Kristofer Agrell (born 13 October 1950) is a Swedish writer and historian within the area of peace and conflict studies. His authorship has mostly focussed on Swedish foreign, security and defence policy during the Cold War.

== Early life ==
Agrell was born on 13 October 1950 in Uppsala, Sweden, the son of Jan Agrell, a professor of pedagogics and psychology working in the area of military psychology, and Estrid (née Ehrenberg). He's the grandson of Sigurd Agrell.

== Career ==
He studied at Stockholm University and received his bachelor's degree in 1972 and he served in the Swedish Army School of Staff Work and Communications (Arméns stabs- och sambandsskola, StabSbS) from 1972 to 1973. Agrell was then sent to the Middle East following the Yom Kippur War as part of the Swedish 52 M Battalion in the United Nations Emergency Force. After that he served in the Air Staff from 1974 to 1976 and was first administrative officer in the Defence Staff from 1976 to 1978. He started working at the Research Policy Institute in 1978 and started postgraduate studies at Lund University the same year, where he received his Ph.D. in history in 1985, with a thesis about the Swedish military doctrine from 1945 to 1982. He became docent at Lund University in 1987 and since 2006 he is professor of intelligence analysis at Lund University.

== Personal life ==
In 1977 he married librarian Camilla Frostell (born 1952), the daughter of agronomist Hilding Frostell and Gunnel (née Brunberg).

== Awards and decorations ==
- United Nations Emergency Force Medal
- (Sweden) Nils Holgersson Plaque (2002)

== Honours ==
- Member of the Royal Swedish Academy of War Sciences (1990)
- Member of the board of Future Forests (from 2008)

== Selected bibliography ==
- Agrell, Wilhelm (1999). Övrig illegal verksamhet: övervakningen av de svenska kärnvapenmotståndarna 1958-1968 (in Swedish). Stockholm: Wahlström & Widstrand. ISBN 9146176128. LIBRIS: 7282911.
- Agrell, Wilhelm (2000). Ökenvägen: minnet av krig (in Swedish). Stockholm: Carlsson. ISBN 9172039221. LIBRIS: 7622494.
- Agrell, Wilhelm (2001). Dödsbudet (in Swedish). Stockholm: Tiden. ISBN 9188877531. LIBRIS: 8382168.
- Agrell, Wilhelm (2002). Svenska förintelsevapen: utvecklingen av kemiska och nukleära stridsmedel 1928-1970 (in Swedish). Lund: Historiska media. ISBN 9189442490. LIBRIS: 8415678.
- Agrell, Wilhelm (2006). Skuggor runt Wallenberg: uppdrag i Ungern 1943-45 (in Swedish). Lund: Historiska Media. ISBN 9185377597. LIBRIS: 10038725.
- Agrell, Wilhelm (2006). Stockholm som spioncentral (in Swedish). Lund: Historiska media. ISBN 9185377090. LIBRIS: 10142336.
- Agrell, Wilhelm (2008). Maskerad front: kalla krigets underättelsehistoria (in Swedish). Lund: Historiska Media. ISBN 9789185507979. LIBRIS: 10601365.
- Agrell, Wilhelm (2009). Underrättelseanalysens metoder och problem: medan klockan tickar- (in Swedish) (1. uppl. ed.). Malmö: Gleerup. ISBN 9789140664112. LIBRIS: 11301896.
- Agrell, Wilhelm (2010). Fredens illusioner: det svenska nationella försvarets nedgång och fall 1988-2009 (in Swedish). Stockholm: Atlantis. ISBN 9789173534178. LIBRIS: 11855650.
- Agrell, Wilhelm (2013). Ett krig här och nu: från svensk fredsoperation till upprorsbekämpning i Afghanistan 2001-2014 (in Swedish). Stockholm: Atlantis. ISBN 9789173536141. LIBRIS: 13589279.
- Agrell, Wilhelm (2014). Fru Petrovas sko: en rysk spiontragedi i 50-talets Australien (in Swedish). Stockholm: Atlantis. ISBN 9789173537070. LIBRIS: 16532638.
- Agrell, Wilhelm (2016). Stora sabotageligan: Kominterns och Sovjetunionens underjordiska nätverk i Sverige (in Swedish). Stockholm: Atlantis. ISBN 9789173538527. LIBRIS: 19424111.
- Agrell, Wilhelm (2017). Sprickor i järnridån: svensk underrättelsetjänst 1944-1992 (in Swedish). Lund: Historiska media. ISBN 9789175455471. LIBRIS: 20690791.
- Agrell, Wilhelm (2018). Det dunkla pusslet: spionagets historia - från faraos ögon och öron till global nätspaning (in Swedish) (Första utgåvan ed.). Stockholm: Natur & Kultur. ISBN 9789127151161. LIBRIS: 22330225.
- Agrell, Wilhelm (2021). Yom Kippur-kriget och Sverige 1973 (in Swedish). Stockholm: Medströms bokförlag. ISBN 9789173291675. LIBRIS: zb613lq1w2ts2fqn.
