= Bijay Chandra Majumdar =

Indian Bengali poet

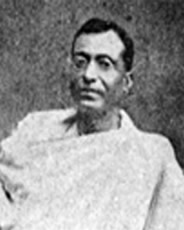
- Born: 27 October 1861; Khanakul, Faridpur, British India (present-day Bangladesh)
- Died: 30 December 1942 (aged 81); Kolkata, West Bengal, India
- Occupations: poet, linguist, anthropologist and archaeologist

Bijay Chandra Majumdar (Bengali: বিজয়চন্দ্র মজুমদার) (27 October 1861 – 30 December 1942) was an Indian Bengali poet, linguist, archaeologist, anthropologist and researcher known for his linguistic studies on the Charyapada. He was nominated for the Nobel Prize in Literature in 1937 and 1939 as Bensadhar Majumdar.

== Biography ==
=== Early life ===
Majumdar was born on 27 October 1861 in Khanakul, Faridpur, British India. He graduated at the Hooghly Branch Government School in 1885 and Metropolitan College in Kolkata, India in 1895 with degrees on literature, history, science and law.

=== Career ===
Majumdar started his career as a private tutor to the sons of Basudeb Sudhal Deb, the Raja of Bamra, and afterwards became the president of the Council of the State. For forty years, he worked as a legal advisor for the State of Sonepur, a teacher at the Puri District School from 1887 to 1891, the headmaster of the Sambalpur District School since 1891, and later practiced law in the Sambalpur and Calcutta High Courts.

Majumdar was equally proficient in Sanskrit, Pali and Prakrit. He was invited to give lectures on Indian tradition and attended the Mahadharma Conference in London in 1908. In 1918, he joined the University of Calcutta as a professor despite being becoming blind since 1914. During this period, he wrote his famous book Odisha in the Making [ওড়িশা ইন মেকিং] (1925), mainly collecting information from various religious texts and deciphering the inscriptions by running his hand over the tablets.

Despite being blind, he was able to research literature, history and science tirelessly due to his extraordinary memory. He and Dinesh Chandra Sen jointly edited the Bangabani magazine and became its sole editor for the last four years. He also edited Shardiya Bangla (1339) and Barshik Shishu Sathi (1335).

=== Death ===
Majumdar died on 30 December 1942.

== Publications ==
=== Poetry collections ===
- কবিতা ("Poem", 1889)
- যুগপূজা ("Yug Puja", 1892)
- ফুলশর ("Fulshar", 1904)
- যজ্ঞভস্ম ("Yajnabhasma", 1904)
- পঞ্চকমলা ("Panchakamala", 1910)

=== Essays ===
- থেরীগাথা ("Therigatha", 1905)
- গীতগোবিন্দ ("Gitagovinda", 1906)
- ব্যাকরণের সন্ধি ("Grammar Treaty", 1911)
- সচ্চিদানন্দ গ্রন্থাবলী ("Sachchidananda Books", 1926)
- প্রাচীন সভ্যতা ("Ancient Civilizations", 1915)
- ভারতবর্ষের ইতিহাস ("History of India", 1919)
- ওড়িশা ইন মেকিং ("Odisha in the Making", 1925)

=== Editorials ===
- বঙ্গবাণী ("Bangabani", 1921-27)
- শিশুসাথী ("Child Companion", 1928-32)
- বাংলা ("Bengali", 1932)
