= The Thibaults =

Series of novels by Roger Martin du Gard

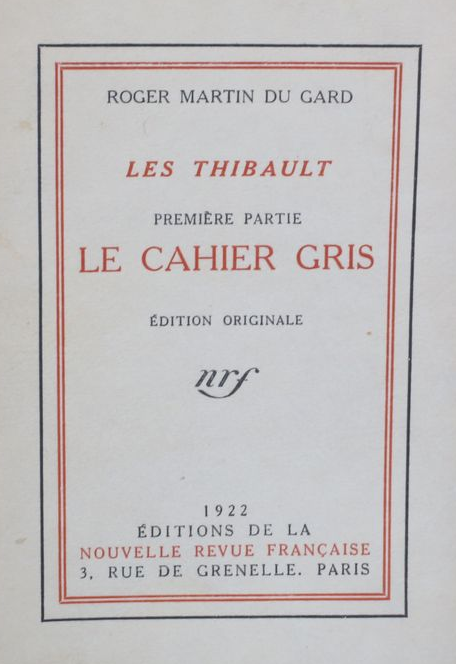
- Author: Roger Martin du Gard
- Original title: Les Thibault
- Translator: Stuart Gilbert, Madeleine Boyd, Stephen Haden Guest
- Language: French
- Genre: Family saga, roman-fleuve
- Publisher: Nouvelle Revue Française (French); Viking Press, Bantam Books (English translation)
- Publication date: 1922–1940
- Publication place: France
- English publication date: 1926–1941
- Media type: Print (hardback & paperback)

The Thibaults (French: Les Thibault) is a multi-volume roman-fleuve (French, novel sequence) by Roger Martin du Gard, which follows the fortunes of two brothers, Antoine and Jacques Thibault, from their upbringing in a prosperous Catholic bourgeois family to the end of the First World War. The author was awarded the 1937 Nobel Prize in Literature largely on the basis of this novel sequence.

== Plot summary ==
1. Le Cahier gris ("The Grey Notebook") opens in Paris around 1904. Catholic clergy who run the school attended by Jacques Thibault have discovered a grey notebook containing messages between him and a Protestant fellow schoolboy, Daniel de Fontanin. The passionate nature of the exchanges could suggest, but does not prove, a sexual relationship. Fearing trouble, the boys run away to Marseille, intending to travel to North Africa by ship. Jacques's widowed father Oscar Thibault, a stern Catholic with a position in society, dispatches his older son, Antoine, a medical student, to look for them.

Daniel's younger sister Jenny falls seriously ill and Thérèse, their mother, goes looking for her errant husband Jérôme, to discover that his list of conquests now includes her cousin Noémie. Antoine visits the de Fontanin apartment and regretfully concludes that Jenny is beyond medical help, but the girl recovers after the intervention of James, a Christian Science faith healer.

In Marseille and unable to find a ship that will accept them, Jacques and Daniel are separated. Daniel is taken in by a prostitute without a client, who initiates him, while Jacques finds shelter under a tarpaulin on the docks. Reunited in the morning, they decide to walk to Toulon, hoping to find a ship there. When they stop for the night at an isolated inn, the proprietress alerts the police. Antoine brings the boys back to Paris, where Thérèse immediately forgives Daniel, but not her husband who appears to want to return. The future of Jacques remains uncertain, however: he will not ask forgiveness from his father and no longer trusts his brother. Confined to his room, he manages to smuggle a note to Daniel assuring him of his devotion.

2. Le pénitencier ("The Prison" or "The Reformatory") resumes the narrative several months later. Antoine visits Jacques in the reformatory at Crouy, where he is disturbed by the boy's isolation and ill-treatment. Determined to rescue him, he confronts his father, who reacts with rage but is eventually persuaded to allow Jacques to be released and to live away from his father's roof under Antoine's supervision. Against his father's wishes, Antoine permits Jacques to see Daniel and his family, and the boys' friendship is renewed, though it becomes less intense. Jenny de Fontanin quickly takes a dislike to Jacques, who in the meantime has fallen in love with an Alsatian girl, Lisbeth, who is serving as the brothers' housekeeper and who, unbeknownst to Jacques, is having an affair with Antoine. Daniel, in the meantime, is attracted to his cousin Nicole (the daughter of Noémie), but she repulses his advances. Lisbeth and Jacques consummate their relationship, but soon afterwards she returns to Alsace, leaving him devastated.

3. La belle saison picks up the narrative approximately five years later. Jacques learns that he has been accepted to the École normale, apparently securing his future prospects. To celebrate, the brothers and Daniel agree to meet at a nightclub, where Daniel is introduced to a young woman, known as Rinette, who is being debuted as a prostitute in hopes of securing a wealthy patron (Daniel’s employer Ludwigson, an art dealer). Rinette has some time earlier given birth to a child out of wedlock, who subsequently died. Disregarding the plan, Daniel leaves the club in the company of Rinette, who tells him that he looks familiar and asks him his name. When she learns his identity she is horrified and starts to flee, but then changes her mind and astonishes Daniel by declaring that she wants to have his baby. In the meantime, we learn that Antoine, who has not arrived at the club, had been called out to tend to a young girl who has been gravely injured in an accident. While performing life-saving surgery in the apartment where the girl lives he is assisted by a neighbor, Rachel, with whom he soon begins a passionate affair.

Mme. de Fontanin receives an urgent summons from her husband Jérôme, who is living in Holland with Noémie. Noémie has fallen ill and soon dies. With Mme de Fontanin absent, Jacques and Jenny go on a long walk together, during which they share their concerns over Daniel, who, like his father, has become something of a womanizer. Jenny finds herself increasingly conflicted about her feelings towards Jacques, and when her mother returns from Holland, with Jérôme in tow, she breaks down sobbing, though she can't bring herself to fully confess her emotions. Jérôme, who is revealed as the father of Rinette's baby, receives a previously undelivered letter, dated two years earlier, in which she appeals for his aid. He now goes to her, gives her money, and sends her off to Brittany. Rachel tells Antoine about the dark chapters in her past, including the suicide of her brother and the death of her infant daughter, and reveals her relationship to a sinister man named Hirsch. Finally she leaves Antoine to rejoin Hirsch in Africa.

4. La consultation begins after a lapse of roughly three years. It is now 1913; Antoine has a thriving medical practice, Jacques has disappeared under circumstances that are not yet clear, and their father is terminally ill. The de Fontanins have receded, for now, into a peripheral role. Much of the narrative centers on Antoine's patients; one of these, a gravely ill infant, is the daughter of Daniel's cousin Nicole, who is now married to a physician named Héquet. Antoine attempts to make a declaration of love to Gise, the half-Malagasy teenage niece of his father's housekeeper, but she is secretly in love with Jacques, whom she is determined to find.

5. La sorellina begins with Jacques unaccounted for. His ailing father believes that he has committed suicide, but Antoine discovers that someone using the name "Jack Baulthy" has recently published a novella in a Swiss magazine and quickly determines that the author is his brother. Written in a florid style and set in Italy, the novella, which itself is entitled La sorellina ("The Little Sister" in Italian), proves to be a roman à clef. Its hero, Giuseppe, has defied his devoutly Catholic father and fallen in love with a young English Protestant named Sybil (based on Jenny); but he has also developed an ardent—and reciprocated—attraction for his younger sister Annetta, a character clearly modeled on Gise. The novella ends with Giuseppe's flight, after a confrontation with his father during which he vows to kill himself. Antoine travels to Lausanne, finds Jacques, who has become embroiled in radical politics, and persuades him to return with him to Paris to see their father before he dies.

6. La mort du père ("The Death of the Father") opens as the brothers take a train back to Paris, but Oscar Thibault is now so ill and close to death that he isn’t aware of Jacques's presence. At the climax of a long and meticulously described deathbed scene, Antoine finally administers a dose of morphine to accelerate the inevitable. With Oscar dead, Antoine goes through his father's papers and effects and finds some photographs and letters that suggest that he may secretly have developed a sentimental attachment of some kind to another woman in the years after his wife's death. Gise has returned from London; although she hasn't seen Jacques for three years she remains desperately in love with him, but Jacques makes it clear that her feelings are not reciprocated. Oscar Thibault is buried with great ceremony in a cemetery adjacent to the reformatory he founded at Crouy. Jacques doesn't attend the funeral but makes a trip on his own to visit his father's grave; an unidentified older woman leaves flowers there at the same time. He receives a long letter from Daniel, who is away from Paris doing his military service and who ardently implores Jacques to renew their friendship.

7. l'Été 1914 ("Summer 1914"), the longest of the eight volumes, is set in the period leading up to and including the beginning of World War I. Antoine Thibault is now a well-to-do physician who is having an affair with a married woman, Anne de Battaincourt; his brother Jacques, on the other hand, is a committed socialist who spends much of his time among radical political circles in Geneva. Much of the narrative centers on the activities of the various socialist and radical groups in the face of the possible outbreak of war between the great powers of Europe. Daniel de Fontanin, by now a promising painter, is continuing his military service, but is called home when his father, Jérôme, commits suicide after being accused of embezzlement. Daniel and Jacques, who have not seen each other for some time, meet again in Paris, but their friendship is strained by the diverging paths their lives are taking. Madame de Fontanin resolves to travel to Vienna to try to straighten out her late husband's business affairs and salvage the family's reputation. While she is absent, Jacques and Jenny de Fontanin, overcoming their apparent longstanding antipathy to each other, become lovers, and while dining together witness the assassination of the antiwar socialist leader Jean Jaurès by a French nationalist. With Jaurès gone, popular opposition to war collapses and the armies of the European powers are mobilized. Disgusted by the failure of the Left to stop the war, Jacques, who refuses to fight under any circumstances, escapes to Switzerland with false papers, while Jenny remains in Paris, intending to join him later. Deciding to sacrifice himself in the name of stopping the war, Jacques and a comrade named Meynestrel hatch a plan to fly over the battlefield in a small plane and drop antiwar leaflets on both sides. After the plane crashes, killing Meynestrel, Jacques, gravely injured, is seized as a spy by French soldiers and is summarily executed as the overwhelmed troops beat a hasty retreat.

8. Epilogue centers on Antoine Thibault and is set in 1918.

== Publication history ==
The first six parts of The Thibaults, ending with La Mort du père ("The Death of the Father"), were published in installments between 1922 and 1929. Martin du Gard was well underway on a seventh, to be called l'Appareillage ("Setting Sail") when he was injured in an automobile accident. While recuperating, he decided that he was dissatisfied with the direction the novel was taking, destroyed the unpublished manuscript, and wrote the final two parts, which appeared in 1936 and 1940.

A partial English-language translation of The Thibaults by Madeleine Boyd appeared in 1926; another partial version, by Stephen Haden Guest, followed in 1933. A complete translation, by Stuart Gilbert, appeared in 1939-1941; this edition gathered the first six parts under the title The Thibaults and assigned the final two parts to a separate volume entitled Summer 1914. The Gilbert translation does not use the individual titles of the novel's first six parts.

== Reception and influence ==
Popular and critical opinion of The Thibaults has in general been more positive in Europe than in the United States. The novel was admired by André Gide, a longtime friend, and by Albert Camus, Clifton Fadiman, and Georg Lukacs, but Mary McCarthy called it "a work whose learned obtuseness is, so far as I know, unequaled in fiction." The implied anti-war message of Summer 1914, parts of which trace the failure of the international socialist community to overcome nationalism and prevent the onset of the First World War, may have affected the reception of the English-language translation, which was released during the early stages of World War II. The novel has been filmed twice for television in France, but its English-language translation is currently out-of-print in the US and Great Britain.

André Gide acknowledged the influence of The Thibaults on his own novel, The Counterfeiters. It has also been suggested that the novel influenced Evelyn Waugh's Brideshead Revisited, another novel that centers on an intense relationship between two young men of opposing religious backgrounds.

The British film director Lindsay Anderson chose the novel as his desert island book for the BBC radio programme, Desert Island Discs.

The author was awarded the 1937 Nobel Prize for Literature largely on the basis of this novel sequence.
