= Katrina (novel) =

1936 novel by Sally Salminen

- First edition (Swedish)
- Author: Sally Salminen
- Language: Swedish
- Genre: Novel
- Publisher: Holger Schildts förlag
- Publication date: 1936
- Publication place: Finland
- Media type: Print (Hardback & Paperback)
- Pages: 347
- ISBN: 951-50-0645-7
- OCLC: 31812325
- LC Class: PT9875.S23 K38 1994

Katrina is a Swedish-language novel published in 1936, written by Åland author Sally Salminen. The publishing company Holger Schildts Förlag had announced a writing competition, for which Salminen had submitted her first draft of Katrina. Salminen won first prize, and the publisher agreed to publish the novel.

According to a nephew of Salminen, Henrik Salminen, her publisher requested 12 different drafts before they finally published the novel. The novel was Salminen's first, and became a surprise success, eventually being translated into more than 20 languages, including English, French and German.

In her native Åland the novel caused a bit of controversy, as several characters in the novel were perceived as being negative portrayals of locally influential persons on Åland at that time. The novel has also been adapted into a feature film in 1943 by Swedish film director Gustaf Edgren, and a musical based on the novel, composed by Jack Mattsson, premiered on Åland in 1997.

== Plot summary ==
Katrina is a young Ostrobothnian woman, the oldest of three daughters, being described as pretty, strong, and proud. She marries a young man from Åland, Johan, who promises her an affluent life on Åland.

Upon arriving on Åland, however, Katrina discovers Johan has lied to her about his wealth and standing in society. He is, in fact, one of the poorest people in the village and is despised by other people. Katrina goes from living a comfortable life with her family to living in squalor and hardship.
