= Clotilde Crespo de Arvelo =

Venezuelan poet and novelist

- Born: 19 September 1887; Los Teques, Miranda, Venezuela
- Died: 20 June 1959 (aged 71); Caracas, Venezuela
- Occupations: novelist, poet and sculptor

Clotilde Angelina Crespo de Arvelo (19 September 1887 – 20 June 1959) was a Venezuelan poet, novelist and sculptor.

== Biography ==
De Arvelo was born on 19 September 1887 in Los Teques, Miranda to Antonio Crespo and Rufina Pérez de Crespo. She was a member of the Centro Nacional de Damas Católicas, the Caracas Athenaeum and the Inter-American Commission of Women in 1936.

She married Enrique Arvelo, a South American agent for the Chalmers Automobile in Detroit, Michigan, and together they had four children. They lived in Plaza Sucre in Caracas until her death on 20 June 1959.

== Awards and recognitions ==
Aside from being a writer, de Arvelo was recognized also for her artworks and sculptures:

- 1919: Gold Award for her exhibition of wax flowers, 1919 at the National Exposition "Louisiana Hacienda".
- 1930: Silver Award for her artistic works and artificial flowers at the International Exposition of Liège.

=== Nobel Prize in Literature ===
In 1930, de Arvelo was nominated for the Nobel Prize in Literature by a member of the Academia Venezolana de la Lengua, the philologist Manuel María Villalobos, becoming the first Latin American female writer to be nominated for the prize.

During the deliberations, the Nobel Committee noted that the titles of de Arvelo's writings "already aroused suspicion that they were hardly of the quality required for the Nobel Prize competition." Her nomination was eventually rejected because her works:

"consist of a few very thin booklets of travel descriptions, with thinner content, mostly accounts of hotel life, entertainment and toilets, and an even smaller booklet, Flores de invernadero, attempts at short stories and descriptions of moods. All of it is nice and completely meaningless, if you ignore the pretension in publishing it. Purely baroque has since become the pretension to put such a patchwork in question a distinction before the whole world."

== Publications ==
- Impresiones de viaje por los Estados Unidos ("Travel Impressions of the United States", 1915)
- Flores de invernadero ("Greenhouse Flowers", 1921)
- A traves de los Andes ("Across the Andes", 1926)
- De los predios del Senor ("From the Lord's Lands", 1927)
- Visiones de Europa ("Visions of Europe", 1928)
