= Rudolf Kassner =

Austrian writer, essayist, translator and cultural philosopher

- Born: 1873
- Died: 1959 (aged 85–86)
- Occupations: Writer; translator; philosopher

Rudolf Kassner (11 September 1873 – 1 April 1959) was an Austrian writer, essayist, translator and cultural philosopher. Although stricken as an infant with poliomyelitis, Kassner traveled widely to northern Africa, the Sahara, India, Russia, Spain, and throughout Europe. His translations of William Blake introduced this English romantic poet to German-speaking audiences. His literary career covered six decades, including a period of isolation during the Nazi years in Vienna. His writings on physiognomy reflect his effort to understand the problems of modernity and Man's subsequent disconnectedness from time and place. His later autobiographical writings suggest a brilliant literary mind attempting to make sense of a chaotic post-nuclear world. He was nominated for the Nobel prize for literature thirteen times.

== Biography ==
Before his birth, Rudolf Kassner's family emigrated to Moravia (at the time part of Austro-Hungary) from Silesia. His father, Oskar Kassner, was a landowner and factory owner, descended from government officials and businessmen. His maternal ancestors were peasants. Kassner regarded himself as a German-Slavic mixture, having inherited German Blut (German: blood) from his mother and a Slavic Geist (German: spirit) from his father (Das physiognomische Weltbild, 116ff.).

=== Student life ===
In 1892, Kassner enrolled at the University of Vienna where he set out to study German philology, Latin, and Philosophy. He spent the last two semesters, in 1895 and 1896, in Berlin, where he attended the lectures of the nationalist historian Heinrich von Treitschke. Kassner, too, was an enthusiastic theater-goer. This formed the basis for later reflections on acting and the role of the actor, important for Kassner's physiognomic worldview, the return from the world of numbers to the kingdom of images. Hans Paeschke has stressed the importance of Kassner's understanding of Gestaltung for this "physiognomy against physiognomy".

In 1896, Kassner returned to Vienna and completed his studies with a doctoral dissertation on Der ewige Jude in der Dichtung (The Eternal Jew in Poetry), which he completed in 1897.
