= Sten Bodvar Liljegren =

Sten Bodvar Liljegren (8 May 1885 – 30 December 1984) was a Swedish Anglist.

He was born in Orrefors, Sweden. Liljegren was Professor of English Philology at the University of Greifswald between 1926 and 1930. He became a professor at Columbia University in New York and was appointed in 1931 as professor in Leipzig. He was appointed in 1939 as professor of English at the Uppsala University. He became emeritus in 1951.

Liljegren was member of the Faculty of Science Society in Lund, Faculty of Science Society in Uppsala and the Society of Sciences in Lund. In 1924 he founded the journal Litteris.

Liljegren in his book Bulwer-Lytton's Novels and Isis Unveiled (1957) wrote that a main source for Helena Blavatsky's Theosophical ideas was Egypt and Isis Unveiled was heavily influenced by Edward Bulwer-Lytton's novels.

== Publications ==
- Studies on the Origin and Early Tradition of English Utopian Fiction (1973)
- The Parentage of Sherlock Holmes (1971)
- Irish Studies in Sweden (1961)
- Bulwer-Lytton's Novels and Isis Unveiled (1957)
- The English Sources of Goethe's Gretchen Tragedy: A Study on the Life and Fate of Literary Motives (1937)
- Studies in Milton (1918)
