= Stijn Streuvels =

Belgian writer (1871–1969)

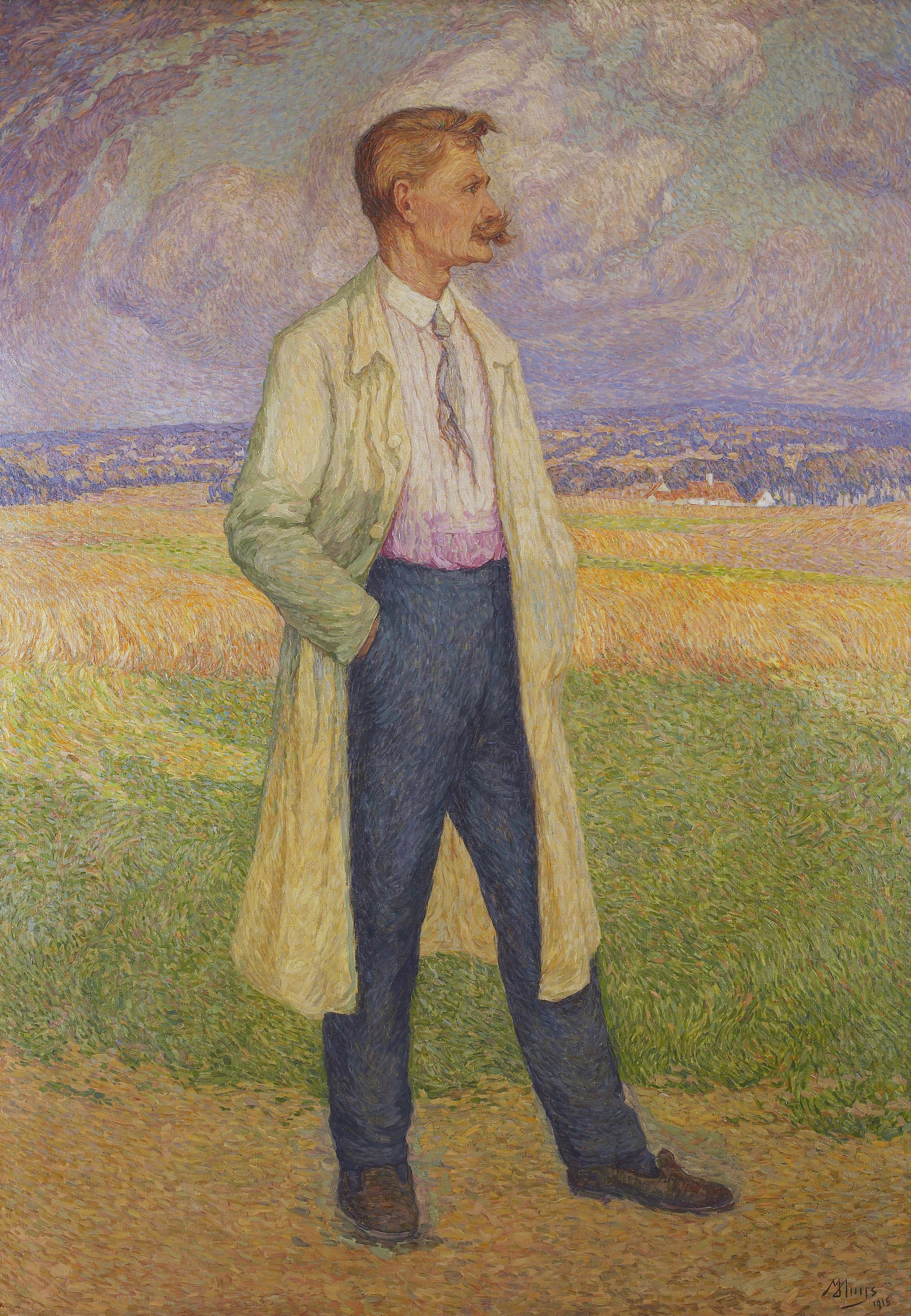
- Stijn Streuvels by Modest Huys
- Born: Franciscus Petrus Maria Lateur; 3 October 1871; Heule, Kortrijk, Belgium
- Died: 15 August 1969 (aged 97); Ingooigem, Anzegem, Belgium
- Occupation: Writer
- Years active: 1899–1966
- Notable work: De vlaschaard
- Spouse: Alida Staelens
- Children: 4
- Relatives: Guido Gezelle (uncle)

Signature
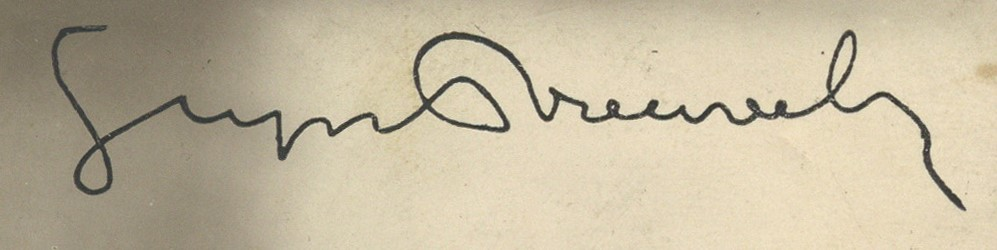

Franciscus "Frank" Petrus Maria Lateur (3 October 1871 – 15 August 1969), known as Stijn Streuvels (Dutch pronunciation: [stɛin ˈstrøːvəls]), was a Flemish Belgian writer.

== Biography ==
He started writing at a very young age. He was inspired by his uncle, the poet Guido Gezelle. Until 1905 he worked as a baker at Avelghem, a village near Kortrijk. Initially his work was published in an insignificant magazine, De jonge Vlaming (The young Fleming). Soon he was discovered by the editors of a new magazine, Van Nu en Straks (From Now and Soon). After their first encounter, Emmanuel de Bom became his mentor and advised him to publish his work in book form.

In 1905 he married Alida Staelens. They had 4 children: Paula (1906), Paul (1909), Dina (1916) and Isa (1922). In 1980 their house became a museum dedicated to Streuvels.

Streuvels work usually deals with the rural life of poor farmers in Flanders. De Teleurgang van de Waterhoek was made into a film titled Mira. Also De vlaschaard (twice) and De blijde dag were filmed.

In 1937 and 1938 Streuvels garnered the majority of the Nobel Committee votes for his receiving the literature Nobel Prize, but each time the academy awarded the prize to someone else: in 1937 he had to give way to Roger Martin du Gard and in 1938 to a new discovery, Pearl Buck. He became doctor honoris causa at the University of Leuven, the University of Münster and the University of Pretoria.

== Published work ==
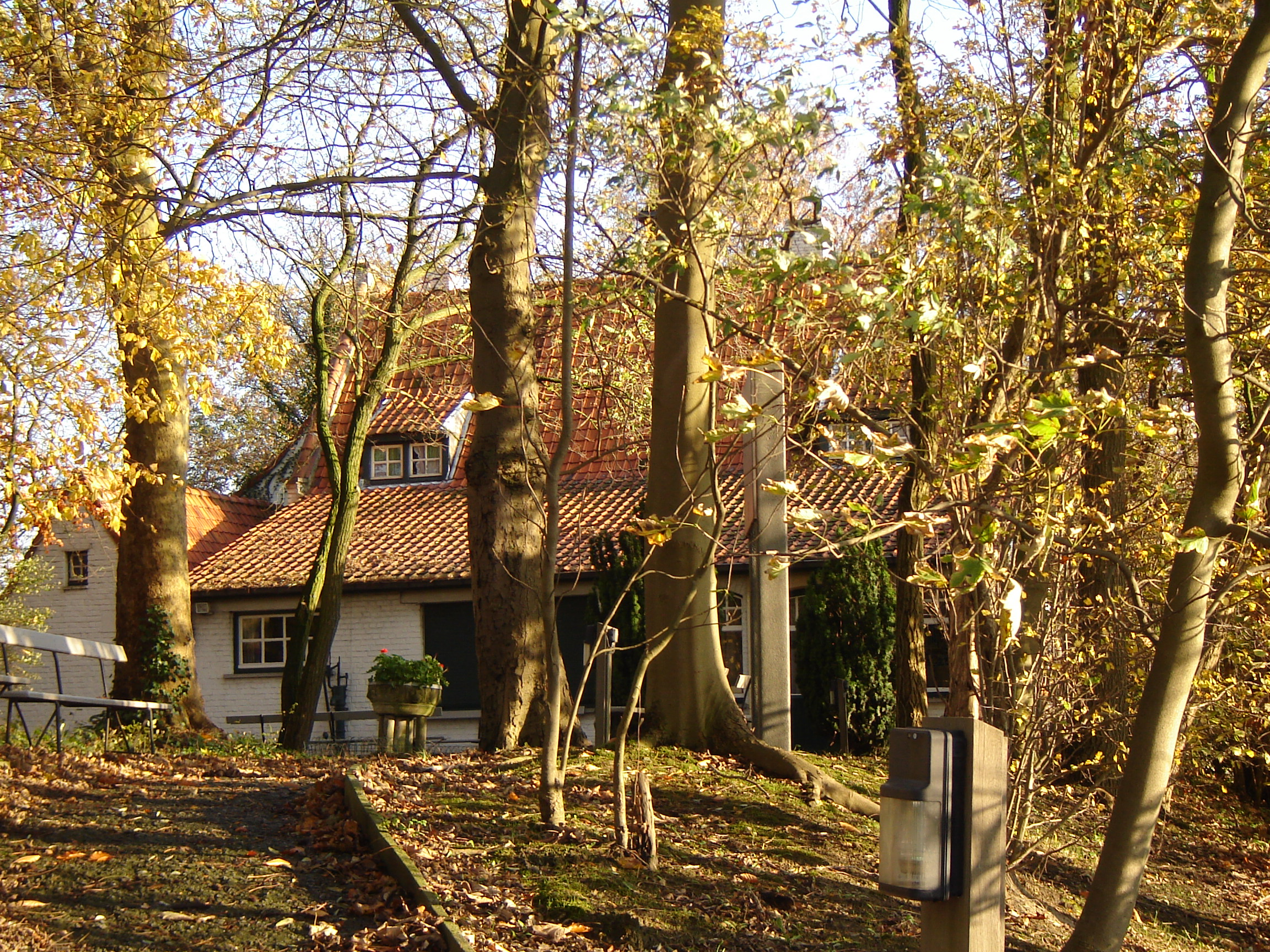
Het Lijsternest, house of Streuvels, now a museum

- Lenteleven (1899) - containing De witte zandweg, In den voorwinter, Kerstavond, Slenteren, Op den dool, Van ongroei, Lente, In de vlage, Een pijpe of geen pijpe, 's Zondags, Een ongeluk, Wit leven and Het einde
- Zomerland (1900) - containing Groeikracht, Zomerland, Meimorgen and Het woud
- Zonnetij (1900) - containing De oogst, In 't water, Zomerzondag and Avondrust
- Doodendans (1901) - containing Doodendans, Jongenstijd (in later editions : Kindertijd), In de wijde wereld, Een speeldag, In de weide, Noorsche liederen, Honden and Doodendans 2
- De oogst (1901) - from Zonnetij
- Langs de wegen (1902) - The book Streuvels himself loved the most
- Dagen (1902) - containing De kalfkoe, Naar buiten, Sint-Jan, Sint-Josef, Vrede and Verovering
- Vertellingen van Tolstoï (1902) - 13 narrations of Tolstoy, translated from German
- Minnehandel (1903) - containing Joel, Maagdekensminne, Het zomerlief, De wondertijd, Het levensbedrijf and In de wonnegaarde
- Geluk in 't huishouden (1903) - Book of Tolstoy, translated from German
- Soldatenbloed (1904) - Dramatic play
- Dorpsgeheimen I (1904) - containing De lawine, Bertken en de moordenaars alle twaalf (in later editions : Een beroerde maandag) and Jantje Verdure
- Dorpsgeheimen II (1904) - containing Kinderzieltje, Martje Maertens en de misdadige grafmaker and Op het kasteel
- Openlucht (1905) - containing Zonder dak, Grootmoederken, Een nieuw hoedje, Het duivelstuig and Jeugd
- Stille avonden (1905) - containing Een lustige begraving, Horieneke, Zomerdagen op het vlakke land, Zonneblommen and Ingoyghem
- Grootmoederken (1905) - from Openlucht
- Het uitzicht der dingen (1906) - containing De kwade dagen, De veeprijskamp and De ommegang
- Reinaert de Vos (1907)
- De vlaschaard (1907)
- Twee vertellingen van Tolstoï (1908)
- Tieghem : Het Vlaamse lustoord (1908) - containing De Streek, Sint Aernout, Het oude Tieghem, Het Lustoord and Eene wandeling
- Najaar I (1909) - containing Najaar, De blijde dag (Najaar was later included in Najaar II; from then on Najaar I became De blijde dag)
- Najaar II (1909) - containing De boomen, Jacht, De aanslag (After inclusion of Najaar I, Najaar II Became Najaar)
- Reinaert de Vos voor de Vierschaar van Koning Nobel de leeuw (1909)
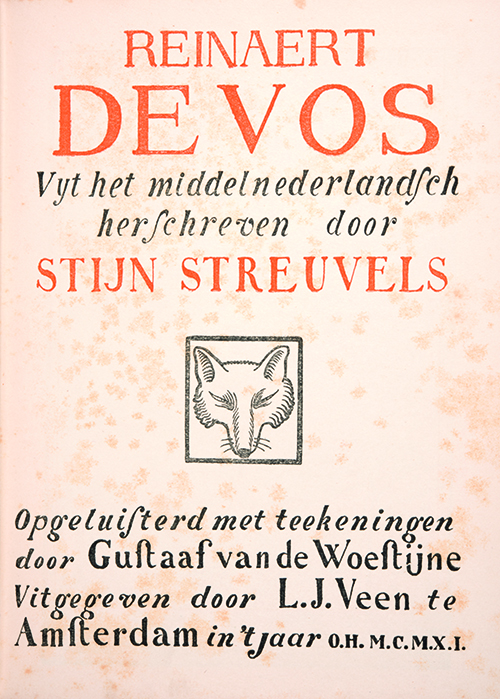
- Reinaert de vos, 1911
  Reinaert de Vos (1910) - Short version of the 1907 edition
- Björnson, Kleine verhalen (1910) - 8 stories of Bjørnstjerne Bjørnson translated from Norwegian
- Vertelsel van Gokkel en Hinkel (1910) - A story of Clemens Brentano translated from German
- De Mourlons (1910) - A book of F. Bouché translated from French
- Het kerstekind (1911)
- Björnstjerne Björnson, Het Bruidslied (1911) - Translated from Norwegian
- Over vrouwe Courtmans (1911) - Text of a lecture
- Het glorierijke licht (1912)
- Morgenstond (1912)
- De werkman (1913) - Later included in Werkmenschen
- De landsche woning in Vlaanderen (1913)
- Een beroerde maandag (1913) - containing Een beroerde maandag and De lawine (from Dorpsgeheimen I)
- Dorpslucht in 2 delen (1914)
- Mijn rijwiel (1915) - containing Mijn rijwiel , Hoe men schrijver wordt
- In oorlogstijd (1915–1916) - containing Augustus 1914, September 1914, October 1914, November 1914, December 1914-I and December 1914-Slot
- De aanslag (1917) from Najaar II
- Charles de Coster's Vlaamsche vertelsels (1918) - translated from French - containing De mannen van Smeerop, Blanca, Clara en Candida, Heere Halewijn and Smedje Smee
- Sint-Jan (1919) - from Dagen
- De boomen (1919) - from Najaar II
- Björnson, Een vrolijke knaap (1919) - from Kleine verhalen
- Genoveva van Brabant Deel I (1919)
- Genoveva van Brabant Deel II (1920)
- Reinaert de Vos (1921)
- De blijde dag (1921) see Najaar I
- De schoone en stichtelijke historie van Genoveva van Brabant (1921) - short version of the work from 1919
- Prutske (1922)
- Grootmoedertje (1922) - Play version of Grootmoederken from Openlucht
- Vertelsels van 't jaar nul (1922) - containing 29 short stories
- Land en leven in Vlaanderen (1923) - containing Het uitzicht, De landsche dorpen, De landsche woningen, De landsche bevolking
- Herinneringen uit het verleden (1924) - containing Onze streek, Damme, Veurn-Ambacht, Volkslectuur (= edited and enhanced version of Over vrouwe Courtmans), Schoonheid, De schoonste deugd, Kinderlectuur, Mijn schooltijd, Het lied van den weemoed, Mijn loopbaan op de planken, Voor den oorlog, Mijn fiets in oorlogstijd, Na den oorlog, Na vijf en twintig jaren
- Tristan en Isolde (1924) - Based on the old folk book
- Op de Vlaamsche binnenwateren (1925) - containing 't Haantje, Dinsdag, Woensdag, Donderdag, Vrijdag, Zaterdag, Zondag
- Waarom ik Vlaanderen liefheb (1926) - original by G. Blachon translated from French
- Werkmenschen (1926) - containing De werkman (separately published in 1913), Kerstmis in niemandsland, Het leven en de dood in den ast
- De teleurgang van den Waterhoek (1927)
- De drie Koningen aan de kust (1927)
- De tijd der kollebloemen (1927) - original by D.-J. D'Orbaix translated from French
- Levenswijsheid uit China (1928) - translated from German
- Vader en dochter (1928) - Correspondence of Tolstoy with his daughter Marie translated from German
- Reinaert de Vos fragment (1928)
- Kerstwake (1928)
- Kerstvertelsel (1929) - In 1938 published as De vreemde verteller
- Over Genoveva van Brabant (1929) - Text of a lecture
- Alma met de vlassen haren (1931)
- De oude wiking (1931)
- Dr. Lauwers schriften (1931) - Text of a lecture
- Drie Russische novellen (1932)
- De rampzalige kaproen (1933) - Rewriting of a medieval rural novel of Wernher de Tuinder
- IJslandsche Godensagen (1933) - containing 18 stories
- Sagen uit het hooge noorden (1934) - containing 38 tales from Denmark, Sweden and Iceland
- Zeelieden en zeevisscherij (1934) - Edited from French book of René de Pauw: Gens de mer et pêche maritime
- Vijf kerstvertellingen (1934) - Translated from French work of Camille Melloy
- Prutske's vertelselboek (1935) - containing 9 stories
- Levensbloesem (1937)
- Paradijssprookjes (1938) - From original of Max Mell.
- De terechtstelling van een onschuldige (1940)
- De maanden (1941) - Title in The Netherlands: Een gang door het jaar
- De grauwe ruiter (1942) - original by Herbert von Hoerner translated from German
- Smedje Smee (1942) - From Vlaamsche vertelsels of Ch. de Coster
- Heule (1942)
- Jantje Verdure (1943) - from Dorpsgeheimen I
- Het leven en de dood in den ast (1944) - from Werkmenschen
- Jeugd (1946) - from Openlucht
- Avelghem (1946)
- Beroering over het dorp (1948) - Short reworked version of Dorpslucht
- Ingoyghem (1951) - Period 1904–1914
- Ingoyghem II (1957) - Period 1914–1940
- Ingooigem (1980) - containing Ingoyghem and Ingoyghem II
- Kroniek van de familie Gezelle (1960)
- Hugo Verriest (1964) - Monography
- In levenden lijve (1966) - Reworkings of some texts from Heule, Avelghem, Ingoyghem and Ingoyghem II, Kroniek van de familie Gezelle and Herinneringen uit het verleden
- In den voorwinter (1970) - from Lenteleven
- Het zinnespel van droom en dood (1971) - play version of Het leven en de dood in den ast
- Hoe ik Brugge gezien en beleefd heb (1971)
- Onze streek (1972) - part of Herinneringen uit het verleden

== Awarded prizes ==
- Prize of Dutch Literature 1906 for his work over the period 1900–1904
- Prize of Dutch Literature 1911 for his work over the period 1905–1909
- State Prize for Literature 1935
- Prize Scriptores Catholici 1950
- Prijs der Nederlandse Letteren 1962 for his entire life work

== See also ==
- Flemish literature

== Sources ==
- Stijn Streuvels
