= Émile Lasbax =

French philosopher and sociologist (born 1888)

- Born: 1888; Rieumes (Haute-Garonne), France
- Died: Unknown

Philosophical work
- Main interests: Philosophy; sociology
- Notable ideas: Rhythm

Émile Lasbax was a French philosopher and sociologist of the early 20th century.

== Biography ==
Lasbax was born in the commune of Rieumes (Haute-Garonne) of southwestern France in 1888. He completed his doctoral thesis, Le Problème du Mal [The Problem of Evil], at the University of Bordeaux under the supervision of Gaston Richard in 1918. He taught in the French lycée at Tarbes and Roanne until he was granted a professorship in philosophy and sociology in the Faculty of Letters at the University of Clermont-Ferrand in 1925. It is here that he would remain until his retirement in 1942. Lasbax was best known for being the successor to Gaston Richard as the director of the Revue Internationale de Sociologie [International Review of Sociology] in 1934 but was also a corresponding member of the Deutschen Gesellschaft für Soziologie [German Society for Sociology] and also the Academy of Political Sciences at Columbia University.

== Thought ==
Lasbax's original work can largely be characterized as a synthesis of metaphysics and sociology. He saw the spiritual and material life of collective society as thoroughly intertwined and asserted that history was developmental such that its final state would yield a truly "human society."

== Influences ==
Early on, Lasbax was heavily influenced by the work of Théodore Ruyssen who was, himself, an interpreter of Henri Bergson. Nevertheless, he drew from a wide variety of thinkers to develop his own original work. Such thinkers include Baruch Spinoza, Johann Gottlieb Fichte, Auguste Comte, Georg Wilhelm Friedrich Hegel and Emile Durkheim.

== Bibliography ==
Books

- Le Problème du Mal. [The Problem of Evil] Paris: Librairie Félix Alcan, 1919.
- La Hiérarchie dans l'Univers chez Spinoza. [The Hierarchy of the Universe in Spinoza] Paris: Librairie Félix Alcan, 1919.
- La Philosophie dans l'Afrique du Nord et l'Histoire de l'Esprit Africain. [Philosophy in North Africa and The History of The African Spirit] Paris: Librairie Félix Alcan, 1922.
- La Dialectique et le Rythme de l'Univers. [Dialectic and The Rhythm of The Universe] Paris: Librairie Philosophique J. Vrin, 1925.
- La Cité Humaine – Esquisse d'une Sociologie Dialectique, T. 1: Histoire des Systèmes Sociologiques et T. 2: Cinématique, Statique et Dynamique Sociales. [The Human City - Sketch of A Dialectical Sociology, T. 1: The History of Sociological Systems and T. 2: Social Kinematics, Statics and Dialectics] Paris: Librairie Philosophique J. Vrin, 1927.
- La France ira-t-elle à un Troisième Empire? [Is France Moving to A Third Empire?] Paris: Generale de Droit et de Jurisprudence, 1936.
- Les Origins du Bergsonisme Sociologique. [The Origins of Sociological Bergsonism] 1937.

Articles

- "L'Œuvre de M. Gaston Richard." [The Oeuvre of M. Gaston Richard] Revue Internationale de Sociologie 43 (1935; Supplement): 37–40.
- "La Sociologie et la Notion d'Equilibre." [Sociology and The Notion of Equilibrium] Revue Internationale de Sociologie (1936).
