= Roger Martin du Gard =

French novelist (1881-1958)

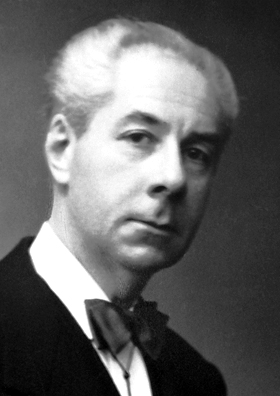
- Born: 23 March 1881; Neuilly-sur-Seine, France
- Died: 22 August 1958 (aged 77); Sérigny, France
- Writing career
- Notable work: The Thibaults
- Notable awards: Nobel Prize in Literature; 1937

Roger Martin du Gard (French: [ʁɔʒe maʁtɛ̃ dy ɡaʁ]; 23 March 1881 – 22 August 1958) was a French novelist, winner of the 1937 Nobel Prize in Literature.

== Biography ==
Trained as a paleographer and archivist, he brought to his works a spirit of objectivity and a scrupulous regard for detail, and because of his concern with documentation and the relationship of social reality to individual development, his fiction has been linked with the realist and naturalist traditions of the 19th century. His sympathy for the humanist socialism and pacifism of Jean Jaurès is evident in his work.

He is best known for The Thibaults, a multi-volume roman fleuve which follows the fortunes of two brothers, Antoine and Jacques Thibault, from their upbringing in a prosperous Catholic bourgeois family to the end of the World War I. Six parts of the novel were published between 1922 and 1929. After abandoning a seventh volume in manuscript, he published two more volumes in 1936 and 1940. Written under the shadow of the darkening international situation in Europe in the 1930s, these last parts, which together are longer than the previous six combined, focus on the political and historical situation leading up to the outbreak of the First World War and bring the story to 1918.

Du Gard wrote several other novels, including Jean Barois, his first success, which was set against the historical context of the Dreyfus affair. During World War II, he resided in Nice, where he prepared a novel (Souvenirs du lieutenant-colonel de Maumort) which remained unfinished at his death. It was posthumously published in 1983. His other works include plays and a memoir of André Gide, a longtime friend.

Du Gard died in 1958 in Sérigny and was buried in the Cimiez Monastery Cemetery in Cimiez, a suburb of the city of Nice, France.

== Partial bibliography ==
- Devenir ! (1908)
- Jean Barois (1913) (translated into English in 1950)
- Les Thibault (1922–1940) (translated as The Thibaults and Summer 1914)
- Confidence africaine (1930) (translated as Confidence Africaine in 1983)
- Vieille France (1933) (translated as The Postman)
- Notes sur André Gide (1951)
- Souvenirs du lieutenant-colonel de Maumort (English: Lieutenant-Colonel de Maumort) (1983)
