= Flávio de Carvalho =

Brazilian architect and artist (1899–1973)

Flávio de Rezende Carvalho (10 August 1899 – 4 June 1973) was a Brazilian architect and artist.

== Biography ==
Carvalho was educated in France from 1911 to 1914, and then in Newcastle upon Tyne until 1922, attending the King Edward the Seventh School of Fine Arts and Durham University's Armstrong College. In Newcastle he obtained degrees in both civil engineering and fine art. Carvalho returned to São Paulo in 1922, joining a local construction firm, before designing his own buildings and creating numerous artworks. In all his diverse practice he was influenced by the writings of Sigmund Freud and of the social anthropologist James Frazer.

=== Career ===
Carvalho was noted for his experimental architectural designs, such as a 1928 scheme for the Governor's Palace in São Paulo, which offered a militaristic version of modernist architecture. "According to Carvalho, his design for the Palácio responded to the decade-long buildup to the Revolution of 1930"; after the upheaval of the 1920s, which included labor unrest and several politically-motivated revolts, Carvalho's design implied that "the seat of government would have to be militarily defensible." Carvalho's drawings for the Palácio show a contiguous cluster of variously sized, low-slung prisms, rising toward a central vertical slab. Architectural historian Lauro Cavalcanti writes that, Carvalho's "freedom and lack of commitment to rigid dogmas led him to create a personal language that mixed styles, references and construction techniques." This openness has also made that Carvalho has been hailed as pivotal figure in activating discussions about the relationship and overlaps between art and architecture. Conversely, art historian Adrian Anagnost argues that Carvalho's "design proposals and performative actions foregrounded the potential of modern architecture and urban planning principles to act as spatial checks on the raw power of Brazil's emergent urban crowds", and that this stance was "rooted in a deep antipathy toward non-elites, rather than an emancipatory collectivity."

Carvalho frequently courted controversy in his time, creating what he called "Experiências" (experiments), "performance art" before that term was introduced. In 1931, he joined a Catholic Corpus Christi parade in São Paulo, walking in the opposite direction and wearing a cap although removing headgear was considered a necessary sign of respect, driving the crowd to call for his lynching, which he later said was an experiment in crowd psychology. This work, the Experiência n. 2 has come to be understood as an early work of performance art, but it could also be understood in terms of Surrealist provocation that comments on the contested structures of political and religious authority in São Paulo following the Revolution of 1930.

In late 1932, Carvalho cofounded the Clube dos Artistas Modernas (CAM; Club of Modern Artists) in São Paulo along with other artists including Emiliano Di Cavalcanti. The CAM was intended as a bohemian space with a small art library and a bar. Its diverse events included live drawing sessions; occasional exhibitions; lectures on Brazilian folklore, Antropofagic poetry, proletarian art, Russian politics, and the plight of children on cocoa plantations in Bahia; and performances of samba, tango, Afro-Brazilian macumba, Russian ballet, Japanese martial arts, and classical chamber music. The class and racial mixing of the audiences at CAM events brought the venue to the attention of Brazil's morals police, who placed the Club under surveillance to root out leftists. In 1933, Carvalho wrote the provocative play Dance of the Dead God to be performed at the modernist Teatro da Experiência (Experimental Theater) at CAM, with spatial design by Carvalho and fellow CAM artists including Tarsila do Amaral and Lívio de Abramo, but the play was shuttered by the morals police after three showings due to the São Paulo government's desire to "limit spaces where cross-class and cross-race political alliances might develop, since the Bailado foregrounded Afro-Brazilian and mixed-race performers within an avowedly vanguard space that catered to mixed-class crowds."

Carvalho's other architectural designs include the Main House at Capuava Ranch in rural São Paulo state and a modernist residential complex at Alameda Lorena in the Jardim Paulista neighborhood of São Paulo.

Amongst Carvalho's most noted works is the 1947 Tragic Series of drawings in charcoal on paper depicting his mother's death. As an artist Carvalho represented Brazil at the 1950 Venice Biennial.

Carvalho could regularly be seen in female clothing, ostensibly as part of a performance art piece he dubbed the "New Look" in 1956, in response to Christian Dior's 1947 New Look, calling it "summer fashion for a new man of the tropics". He considered jackets, collars, and ties as relics of European colonization, inappropriate for a tropical climate, and symbolising cultural conformity. As an engineer Carvalho's unisex design was functional and designed for hot weather; for example, arm and other movements pumped air through cuts in the cloth. The New Look initially had provision to keep fabric away from the skin, appropriate for a hot climate, but this was not effective, and was dropped.

Carvalho's provocations were rediscovered by a later generation of artists interested in performance, including Hélio Oiticica.
