= Sally Salminen =

Swedo-Finnish author (1906–1976)

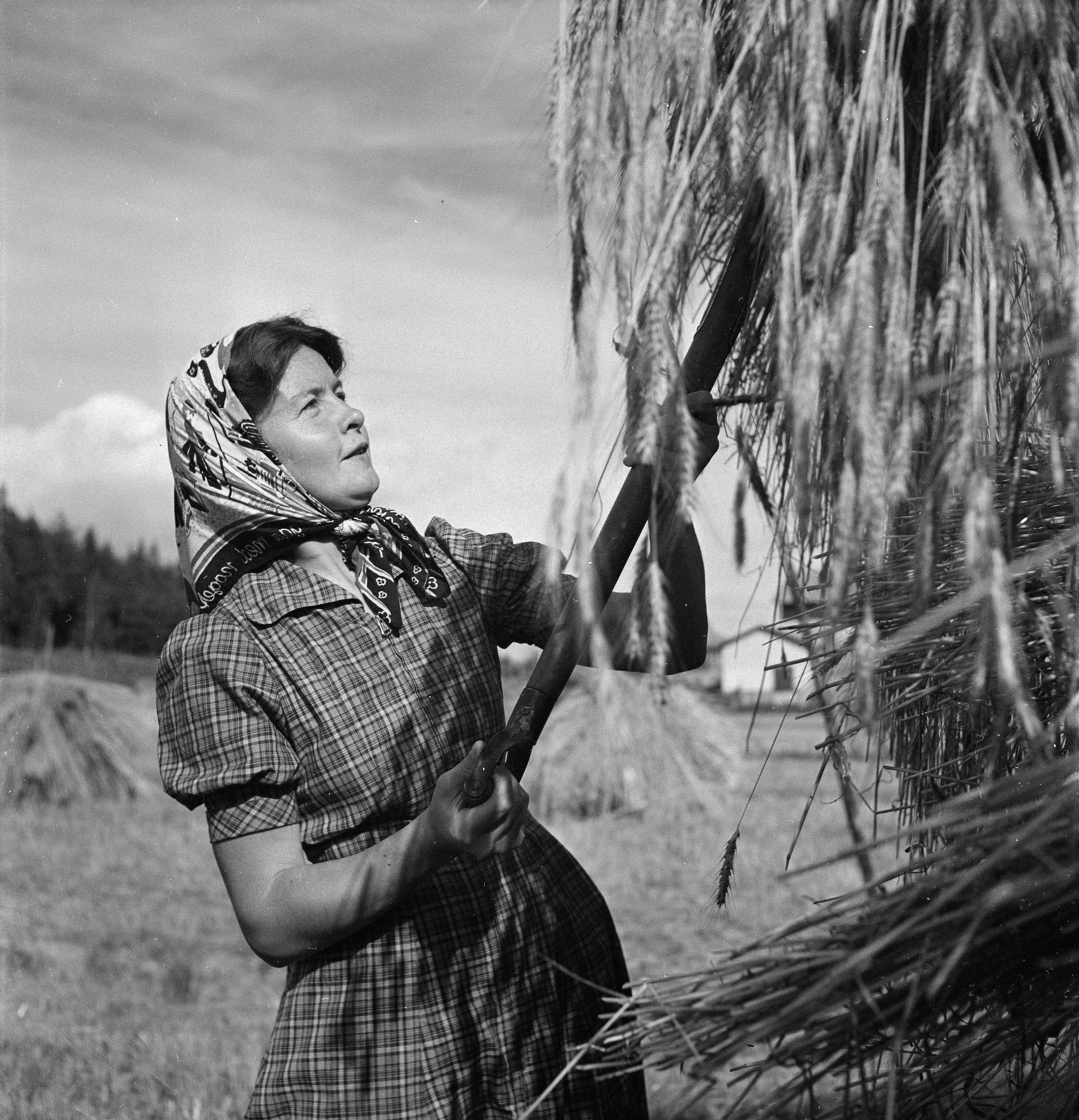
- Salminen in 1941
- Born: 25 April 1906; Vårdö, Finland
- Died: 18 July 1976 (aged 70); Copenhagen, Denmark
- Resting place: Cemetery of Holmen
- Education: Primary school, correspondence courses
- Occupation: Writer
- Spouse: Johannes Dührkop
- Writing career
- Language: Swedish
- Years active: 1936–1974
- Notable work: Katrina
- Notable awards: Tollander Prize (1937)

Sally Alina Ingeborg Salminen (25 April 1906 – 18 July 1976), from 1940 Salminen-Dührkop, was an author from Vargata, the Åland Islands, Finland. She was nominated for the Nobel Prize in Literature three times.

== Life ==
Born in Vårdö, Åland, Sally Salminen was the eighth child of twelve. Her father, Hindrik Albin Salminen, was a small farmer and postman, and her mother was Erika Maria Eriksson. Already as a child she entertained notions of becoming an author, but she considered herself to be too poor and unknowledgeable to succeed as a writer. After her confirmation, she worked in the village grocery store in Vårdö (1922–1924 and 1928), until she moved to Stockholm, Sweden, to work as a maid. She also worked as a shop assistant in Stockholm and Linköping between 1924 and 1927. During her tenure in Sweden she took correspondent courses and read books in her spare time.

After working in Sweden, she worked as a cashier and accountant in Mariehamn, Åland, from 1929 to 1930. In 1930 Sally and her sister Aili moved to New York City, United States, where Salminen worked as a domestic helper. While in New York, she wrote during her spare time, and it was here she started writing the manuscript for her first (and most famous) novel, Katrina. Finland-Swedish publisher Holger Schildts Förlag announced in 1936 a writing contest, for which Salminen submitted her manuscript. Her submission won, and Katrina was published the same year. In 1937, she was awarded the Tollander Prize. The novel depicts the life of an Ostrobothnian woman, Katrina, who moves to Åland following her marriage. Katrina became an international success, eventually being translated into more than twenty languages.

Sally Salminen married Danish painter Johannes Dürhkop in 1940, and relocated to Denmark. She resided in Denmark from 1949 until her death in 1976. Salminen remained a prolific writer, but she was never able to replicate the success of her debut novel, Katrina.

== Family ==
Several of Salminen's siblings were also authors. Her sister Aili Nordgren (née Salminen) (1908–1995) wrote several books. Her younger brother Runar Salminen (1912–1988) released anthologies of poetry, and elder brother Uno Salminen (1905–1991) wrote a trilogy of books about the fictional character Erik Sundblom.

Aili Nordgren's son Ralf Nordgren (born 1936) and Uno Salminen's daughter Christina Remmer (born 1941) have were also authors.

== Bibliography ==
=== Novels ===
- Katrina (1936). Published in Finnish as Katriina (1936), translated by Aukusti Simojoki.
- Den långa våren (1939). Published in Finnish as Pitkä kevät (1939), translated by Aukusti Simojoki.
- På lös sand (1941). Published in Finnish as Hiekalle rakettu (1941), translated by Aukusti Simojoki.
- Lars Laurila (1943)
- Nya land (1945)
- Barndomens land (1948)
- Små världar (1949)
- Klyftan och stjärnan (1951)
- Prins Efflam (1953). Published in Finnish as Kalastajakylän prinssi (1953), translated by Katri Ingman.
- Spår på jorden (1961). Published in Finnish as Jäljet maan mullassa (1961), translated by Mirja Heickell.
- Vid havet (1963). Published in Finnish as Meren saari (1964), translated by Kyllikki Hämäläinen.

=== Factual ===
- Jerusalem (1970)
- På färder i Israel (1971)

=== Autobiographical ===
- Upptäcktsresan (1966)
- Min amerikanska saga (1968)
- I Danmark (1972)
- Världen öppnar sig (1974)
