= Sigurd Agrell =

Swedish poet, translator, runologist and professor

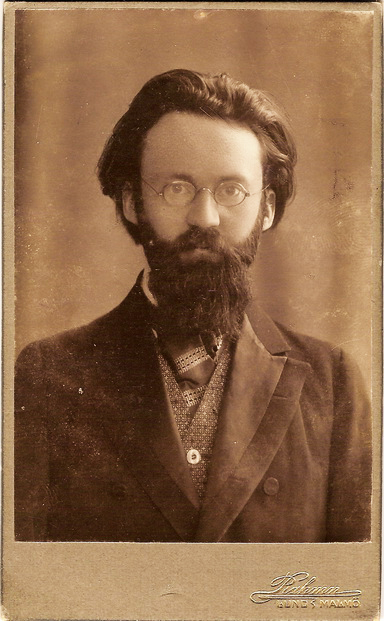
Sigurd Agrell

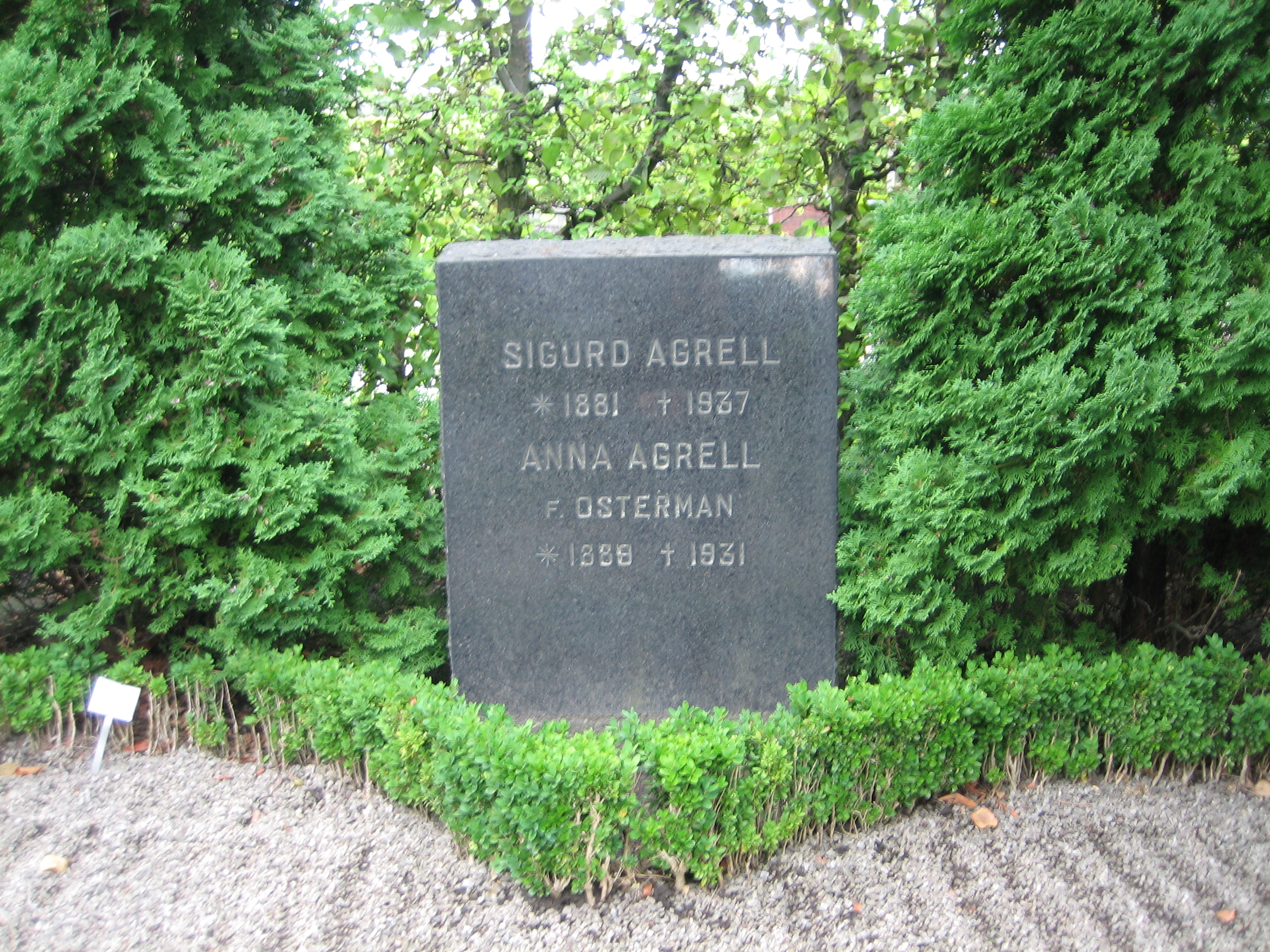
Sigurd Agrell's tombstone at Norra kyrkogården in Lund.

Per Sigurd Agrell (16 January 1881 in Värmland – 19 April 1937 in Lund) was a Swedish poet, translator, runologist and professor of Slavic languages at Lund University.

== Biography ==
Agrell's parents were Frans Vilhelm Agrell (1843–1900) and Ida Vendela Örtenholm (1851–1928). After graduating from secondary school in Norrmalm in 1898, he was admitted to Uppsala University, where he earned his licentiate degree in 1907. He then continued his academic career at Lund University, where he in 1908 defended his PhD thesis on aspect in Polish. He received his doctoral degree in 1909 and was later appointed associate professor (docent) at the same university.

Having taught at Lund University since 1908, Agrell became professor of Slavic languages in 1921. He translated a number of Russian books, such as Slavic legends, and Ivan Bunin's stories. His 1925 translation of Leo Tolstoy's Anna Karenina was for a long time the standard translation of this novel in Sweden. At first, however, it was criticized for being more personal and original that a previous translation by Walborg Hedberg. Alongside his work in Slavic languages, Agrell was also interested in runology, and published a number of papers in this field.

He began his poetic career as a 16-year-old secondary school student in Örebro, where he contributed with translations and own poems to Lingvo internacia, an Esperanto magazine that had been published in Uppsala since 1895. Among others, he translated poems by Swedish authors Erik Johan Stagnelius and Per Daniel Amadeus Atterbom.

During his studies in Uppsala, Agrell belonged, together with John Landquist, Sven Lidman and Harald Brising to Les quatre diables, a group of students with literary interests. Agrell wrote mainly symbolist poetry, with an emphasis on form, but his interest in writing diminished as modern free verse poetry gained popularity in Sweden. At the same time, he became more focused on his academic work.

He is perhaps most known for his work in runology, particularly for formulating the Uthark theory. He focused on the magical and mystical aspects of runes (gematria).

Agrell married Anna Elvira Osterman. He was father to military psychologist Jan Agrell and zoologist Ivar Agrell, and grandfather to historian Wilhelm Agrell. He died in 1937 and is buried at Norra kyrkogården in Lund.

== Poem collections ==
- 1903 - Arabesker
- 1905 - Solitudo
- 1906 - Hundra och en sonett
- 1908 - Den dolda örtagården
- 1909 - Purpurhjärtat
- 1912 - Antika kaméer
- 1931 - Valda dikter

== Selected works in philology ==
- 1908 - Aspektänderung und aktionsartbildung beim polnischen zeitworte
- 1913 - Intonation und auslaut im slavischen
- 1915 - Zur slavischen lautlehre
- 1917 - Slavische lautstudien

== Selected works in runology ==
- 1927 - Runornas talmystik och dess antika förebild
- 1930 - Rökstenens chiffergåtor och andra runologiska problem (Available online via Projekt Runeberg)
- 1931 - Senantik mysteriereligion och nordisk runmagi: en inledning i den nutida runologiens grundproblem
- 1932 - Die spätantike Alphabet-Mystik und die Runenreihe
- 1934 - Lapptrummor och runmagi: tvenne kapitel ur trolldomsväsendets historia (Available online via Projekt Runeberg)
- 1936 - Die pergamenische Zauberscheibe und das Tarockspiel
- 1938 - Die Herkunft der Runenschrift
