= De vlaschaard =

De Vlaschaard (Dutch pronunciation: [də ˈvlɑs.aːrt]; modern spelling: De Vlasaard; The Flaxfield) is a 1907 novel in Dutch by Stijn Streuvels. It became his best-known novel, sold more than 200,000 copies and was turned into a movie twice, in 1943 and 1983.

== Creation ==
Stijn Streuvels was married in 1905 and had moved to Het Lijsternest, his house in Ingooigem where he would live for the remainder of his life. Between November 1906 and January 1907, he wrote De vlaschaard.

== Publication ==
De vlaschaard was pre-published in five parts (one part for each of the first three chapters, and two parts for the much longer final chapter) in the Dutch magazine De Beweging (The movement) between January and June 1907. In December of the same year, the first impression of the book was published in Amsterdam by L.J. Veen. It had 332 pages. The same year a luxury edition of 250 copies with cover illustration by Emmanuel Viérin was printed.

Further Veen editions appeared in 1910, 1912, 1914, 1917, 1920 (as part of the Collected Works of Streuvels), and 1926.

The 9th impression, in 1932, was the first to be published by Flemish publisher Lannoo, with a cover illustration by Jozef Cantré. The 10th impression, in 1941, was again with Veen (in a reedition of the Collected Works), but in the same year Lannoo published a cheap edition ("Volksuitgave" or "People's edition") of 100,000 copies. The 12th impression was still in 1941, in the "Lijsternestreeks", a new series of the collected works of Streuvels published by Lannoo and Standaard Uitgeverij, with illustrations by Renaat Demoen. This brought the total number of copies of the book to 160,000.

The 13th edition, in 1942, was a special edition for South Africa and was printed in Pretoria by J.L. Van Schaik. Standaard published in 1943 a special film edition to coincide with the release of the German movie version. The same year, Lannoo published another film edition.

Standaard and Lannoo again collaborated in 1944 for a special signed luxury edition of 1,000 copies to celebrate the milestone of 200,000 copies. This version was illustrated by Albert Saverys.

After the Second World War, multiple publishers created new editions in 1948, 1953, 1955 and 1962. In 1965 Desclée de Brouwer created another luxury edition, this time illustrated by Frans Masereel. Further editions appeared in 1966, 1967, 1968, 1970 (4), 1972 (as part of the Complete Works, and as a reprint of the Masereel luxury edition), 1974, 1977, 1978, 1980, 1983 (a film edition to coincide with the second movie), 1985, 1989, 1993 and finally the 39th edition in 2003 (newspaper edition for Het Laatste Nieuws).

== Plot ==
The novel has four parts: "De zaaidhede" ("the sowing"), "De wiedsters" ("the weed removers"), "Bloei" ("flowering"), and "De slijting" (the manual pulling of the flax without removal of the roots). It is situated on a prosperous farm of flax growers. The main focus is the conflict between the old farmer Vermeulen and his son and successor Louis, culminating in a row where the farmer badly beats his son, eventually resulting in his death.

== Films ==
De vlaschaard was turned into a movie twice. The first version was made in Germany in 1943 and was called Wenn die Sonne wieder scheint. Paul Wegener and Paul Wegener played the main roles, and it was directed by Boleslaw Barlog. In 1983 a Flemish version called De vlaschaard was made by Jan Gruyaert, with the main roles played by Vic Moeremans and René van Sambeek.

== Translations ==
- Czech: Lniste, 1942; a play based on the work appeared in 1944
- English: The Flaxfield, published by Sun & Moon Press, 1988
- French: Le champ de lin, published by Zonnewende in Courtrai, 1943 (reprinted 1945)
- German: Der Flachsacker, published by Insel Verlag, 1918; a second translation appeared with them in 1940, and a play based on this work was published in 1942; a third translation appeared in 1986 with Manesse Verlag
- Slovenian: Lanena Njiva, 1934
- Spanish: El Campo de Lino, 1947

== Notes ==
- De Smedt, Marcel, ed. (2007). Wie heet er u te slijten ?: over "De vlaschaard" van Stijn Streuvels (in Dutch). Lannoo. ISBN 9789020969870.
- Janssen S.J., Em. (1946). Stijn Streuvels en zijn Vlaschaard (PDF) (in Dutch). Lannoo - Standaard.
