= 1936 Nobel Prize in Literature =

- Eugene O'Neill
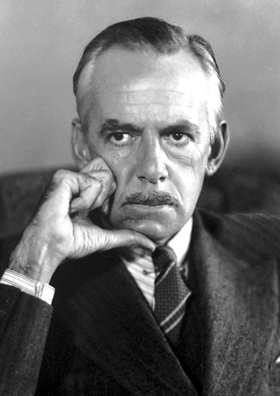
- "for the power, honesty and deep-felt emotions of his dramatic works, which embody an original concept of tragedy"
- Date: 12 November 1936 (Note: The Swedish Academy decided on 12th November 1936 that the 1935 Nobel Prize in Literature would not be awarded and that this year's Nobel Prize in Literatue should be awarded to Eugene O'Neill.) (announcement); 10 December 1936 (ceremony)
- Location: Stockholm, Sweden
- Presented by: Swedish Academy
- First award: 1901
- Website: Official website

The 1936 Nobel Prize in Literature was awarded to the American playwright Eugene O'Neill (1888–1953) "for the power, honesty and deep-felt emotions of his dramatic works, which embody an original concept of tragedy". He is the second American to become a literature laureate after Sinclair Lewis in 1930 and the only American playwright awarded the prize.

== Laureate ==
Influenced by the realist playwrights Chekhov, Strindberg and Ibsen, Eugene O'Neill is regarded as the foremost American dramatist of the 20th century. His plays were among the first to include speeches in American English vernacular and involve characters on the fringes of society who struggle to maintain their hopes and aspirations, but ultimately slide into disillusion and despair. He was awarded the Pulitzer Prize for Drama four times, first for Beyond the Horizon (1920), his debut play, followed by Anna Christie in 1922, Strange Interlude in 1928 and Long Day's Journey into Night in 1957. Mourning Becomes Electra (1931) and the posthumous Long Day's Journey into Night is regarded as two masterpieces in a long string of plays.

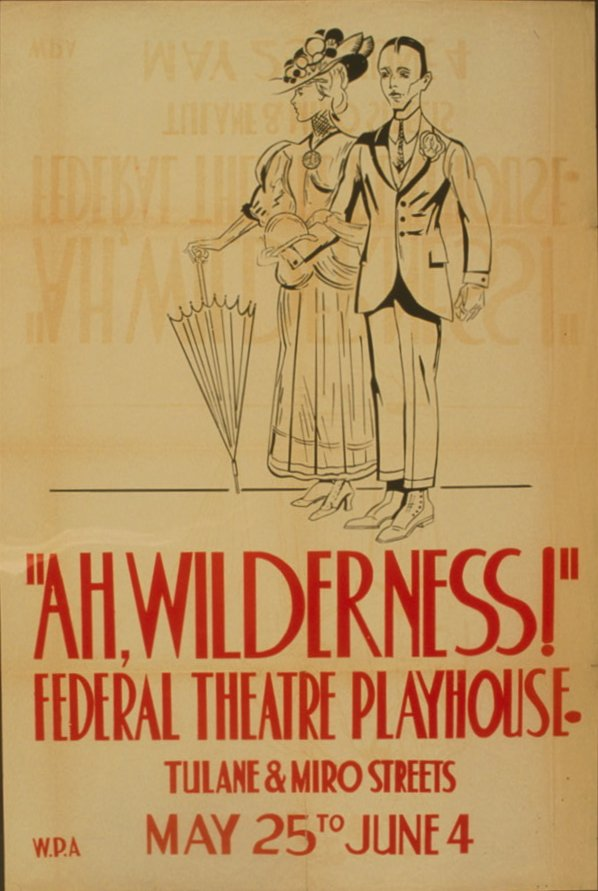
In a writing career that revolves around human tragedies, Ah, Wilderness! is O'Neill's only well-known comedy.

== Deliberations ==
=== Nominations ===
Eugene O'Neill was nominated for the prize three times (1934, 1935, and 1936). In 1936 the Nobel committee received 47 nominations for 27 writers including Paul Valéry, António Correia de Oliveira, Miguel Unamuno, Kostis Palamas, Olav Duun, Jarl Hemmer, Karel Capek, Benedetto Croce, Roger Martin du Gard (awarded in 1937) and Johannes V. Jensen (awarded in 1944). Ten were newly nominated such as Georges Duhamel, Ludwig Klages, Sigmund Freud, Cécile Tormay, Enrica von Handel-Mazzetti and Arvid Mörne. Most nominations were submitted for the Finnish author Frans Emil Sillanpää (awarded in 1939) with five nominations, including two nominations suggesting a shared prize with Jarl Hemmer and Arvid Mörne respectively. Only two women were nominated namely Cécile Tormay Tormay and Enrica von Handel-Mazzetti.

The authors Juliette Adam, Jacques Bainville, Mateiu Caragiale, James Churchward, Eugène Dabit, Adolf de Herz, Teresa de la Parra, Ramón del Valle-Inclán, Stefan Grabiński, Federico García Lorca, A. E. Housman, M. R. James, Kitty Lee Jenner, Dezső Kosztolányi, Mikhail Kuzmin, Mourning Dove, Elizabeth Robins Pennell, Kristína Royová, Moritz Schlick, Jan Jacob Slauerhoff, Oswald Spengler, Dhanpat Rai Srivastava (known as Premchand), Heinrich Rickert, Ferdinand Tönnies, Lidia Veselitskaya and Zhou Shuren (known as Lu Xun) died in 1936 without having been nominated for the prize.

Official list of nominees and their nominators for the prize
No.	Nominee	Country	Genre(s)	Nominator(s)
1	Hari Mohan Banerjee (–1960)	India	essays	Devadatta R. Bhandarkar (1875–1950)
2	António Correia de Oliveira (1878–1960)	Portugal	poetry	Luís da Cunha Gonçalvez (1875–1956)
3	Benedetto Croce (1866–1952)	Italy	history, philosophy, law	Julius von Schlosser (1866–1938)
4	Karel Čapek (1890–1938)	Czechoslovakia	drama, novel, short story, essays, literary criticism	several professors (Note: Several professors of history and history of literature from the Prague, Czech Republic.)
5	Miguel de Unamuno (1864–1936)	Spain	novel, poetry, philosophy, essays, drama	Manuel García Blanco (1902–1966) (Note: Miguel de Unamuno y Jugo was nominated by J. Ramos Loscertales, F. Maldonado, J. Camón Aznar and M. Garcia Blanco, with approval from 6 other professors, all from Salamanca University.); José Camón Aznar (1898–1979); Francisco Maldonado de Guevara (1891–1985); José María Ramos Loscertales (1890–1956)
6	Asis Domet (1890–1943)	Mandatory Palestine	essays, translation	G. E. Khoury (–)
7	Roger Martin du Gard (1881–1958)	France	novel, drama, memoir	Torsten Fogelqvist (1880–1941)
8	Georges Duhamel (1884–1966)	France	novel, short story, poetry, drama, literary criticism	Hjalmar Hammarskjöld (1862–1953)
9	Olav Duun (1876–1939)	Norway	novel, short story	Helga Eng (1875–1966); Jens Thiis (1870–1942); Torstein Høverstad (1880–1959)
10	Alfred Edward Evershed (1870–1941)	Australia	essays, pedagogy	Elias Edward Miller (1878–1937)
11	Hans Fallada (1893–1947)	Germany	novel, short story	Martin Lamm (1880–1950)
12	Sigmund Freud (1856–1939)	Austria	essays	Romain Rolland (1866–944)
13	Jarl Hemmer (1893–1944)	Finland	poetry, novel	Sigurd Erixon (1888–1968); Gunnar Landtman (1878–1940) (Note: G. Landtman suggested the Nobel Committee to award F. Sillanpää alone. His second suggestion, to share the prize with Sillanpää, was J. Hemmer or A. Mörne.); Hjalmar Hammarskjöld (1862–1953)
14	Johannes Vilhelm Jensen (1873–1950)	Denmark	novel, short story, essays	Johannes Brøndum-Nielsen (1881–1977); Frithiof Brandt (1892–1968); Carl Adolf Bodelsen (1894–1978); Vilhelm Andersen (1864–1953)
15	Ludwig Klages (1872–1956)	Germany	philosophy, poetry, essays	Wilhelm Pinder (1878–1947)
16	Erwin Guido Kolbenheyer (1878–1962)	Austria	novel, short story, poetry, drama	Hans-Friedrich Rosenfeld (1899–1993)
17	Dmitry Merezhkovsky (1865–1941)	Soviet Union	novel, essays, poetry, drama	Sigurd Agrell (1881–1937)
18	Arvid Mörne (1876–1946)	Finland	poetry, drama, novel, essays	Gunnar Landtman (1878–1940)
19	Eugene O'Neill (1888–1953)	United States	drama	Henrik Schück (1855–1947)
20	Kostis Palamas (1859–1943)	Greece	poetry, essays	Harry Fett (1875–1962); Sofia Antoniadou (?)
21	Sarvepalli Radhakrishnan (1888–1975)	India	philosophy, essays, law	Hjalmar Hammarskjöld (1862–1953)
22	Frans Eemil Sillanpää (1888–1964)	Finland	novel, short story, poetry	Yrjö Hirn (1870–1952); Rafael Erich (1879–1946); Björn Collinder (1894–1983); Sigurd Erixon (1888–1968); Gunnar Landtman (1878–1940)
23	Hermann Stehr (1864–1940)	Germany	novel, short story, poetry, drama	Hermann August Korff (1882–1963)
24	Cécile Tormay (1875–1937)	Hungary	novel, short story, essays, translation	Jenö Pintér (1921–1988); János Horváth (1878–1961); Károly Pap (1897–1945); János Hankiss (1893–1959)
25	Paul Valéry (1871–1945)	France	poetry, philosophy, essays, drama	3 members of the Belgian Academy; Viggo Brøndal (1887–1942); Jean-Jacques Salverda de Grave (1863–1947) (Note: Valéry was nominated jointly by J. Bidez and J. Salverda de Grave, both member of the Royal Netherlands Academy of Arts and Sciences); Joseph Bidez (1867–1945)
26	Edvarts Virza (1883–1940)	Latvia	poetry, essays, translation	Francis Balodis (1882–1947) (Note: E. Virza was nominated by L. Bērziņš and F. Balodis); Ludis Bērziņš (1870–1965)
27	Enrica von Handel-Mazzetti (1871–1955)	Austria	novel, poetry, essays	Moriz Enzinger (1891–1975) (Note: E. von Handel-Mazzetti was jointly nominated by J. Nadler and M. Enzinger); Josef Nadler (1884–1963)

== Prize decision ==
Considered authors for the 1936 Nobel Prize in Literature included Karel Čapek, Miguel de Unamuno, Cecile Tormay, Georges Duhamel, Roger Martin du Gard, Johannes V. Jensen, Paul Valéry, António Correia de Oliveira, Benedetto Croce, Ludwig Klages and Sigmund Freud, but the Nobel committee found none of the candidates recommendable for the prize. In a separate report to the Swedish Academy, committee member Henrik Schück successfully advocated that the prize for 1936 should be awarded to the American playwright Eugene O'Neill, rather than cancelling the awarding of the prize for a second year in succession. In another separate report, committee member Fredrik Böök pushed for awarding the Hungarian author Cecile Tormay.

On 12 November 1936 the Swedish Academy decided that the postponed prize for 1935 should not be awarded and that the prize for 1936 should be awarded to Eugene O'Neill.

== Reactions ==
The choice of Eugene O'Neill was generally well received. "No one in the postwar years has done more to stir interest in drama throughout the world than Mr. O'Neill!", The Guardian said. The Ceylon Daily News said that O'Neill was "our most modern dramatist in that he alone has succeeded in breasting back across that ocean of 2,000 years and more which roll between our time and the ancient Greek." The earlier Irish Nobel prize laureates George Bernard Shaw and William Butler Yeats both said that they were pleased that O'Neill was awarded the prize. "I have the greatest admiration for his work", Yeats said. A negative reaction appeared in the communist newspaper The Daily Worker, lamenting that O'Neill had become "increasingly safe and conservative...O'Neill, who started out as a dramatist of the working class, has completed his middle period as the dramatist of a sick middle class."

== Banquet speech ==
Because of the state of his health, Eugene O'Neill was unable to travel to Stockholm to receive the prize. But he delivered a speech that was read by the American chargé d'affaires at the banquet in Stockholm City Hall. In the speech, O'Neill paid tribute to the Swedish dramatist August Strindberg and the great influence Strindberg had on his work.
