= 1935 Nobel Prize in Literature =

- Date: 14 November 1935 (Note: The Swedish Academy decided on 14th November 1935 that this year's Nobel Prize in Literature would be reserved for the following year.) (postponement)
- First award: 1901
- Website: Official website

The 1935 Nobel Prize in Literature was not awarded after the Swedish Academy decided that no author in the field of literature was a suitable candidate. Hence, the prize money for this year was 1/3 allocated to the Main Fund and 2/3 to the Special Fund of this prize section.

== Deliberations ==
=== Nominations ===
The Nobel Committee of the Swedish Academy received 52 nominations for 38 authors like Frans Eemil Sillanpää (awarded in 1939), Johannes V. Jensen (awarded in 1944), Paul Valéry, Dmitry Merezhkovsky, Roger Martin du Gard (awarded in 1937) and H. G. Wells.

Fourteen of the nominees were newly recommended for the prize such as Shaul Tchernichovsky, Miguel de Unamuno, Jules Romains, John Masefield, Elise Richter, Edvarts Virza, Víctor Manuel Rendón, Émile Mâle, James Cousins and G. K. Chesterton. There were five women nominees: Ivana Brlić-Mažuranić, Violet Clifton, Ricarda Huch, Maria Madalena de Martel Patrício and Elise Richter.

The authors Henri Barbusse, Ioan Bianu, Arthur Hoey Davis (known as Steele Rudd), Clarence Day, Ella Loraine Dorsey, Charlotte Perkins Gilman, Anna Katharine Green, Kaitarō Hasegawa, Mary R. P. Hatch, Louise Manning Hodgkins, Winifred Holtby, Panait Istrati, T. E. Lawrence, James Leslie Mitchell (known as Lewis Grassic Gibbon), Violet Paget (known as Vernon Lee), Fernando Pessoa, Lizette Woodworth Reese, George William Russell, Tsubouchi Shōyō, Kurt Tucholsky, William Watson and Stanley G. Weinbaum died in 1935 without having been nominated for the prize.

Official list of nominees and their nominators for the prize
No.	Nominee	Country	Genre(s)	Nominator(s)
1	Rufino Blanco Fombona (1874–1944)	Venezuela	essays, literary criticism	Several professors from American universities
2	Ivana Brlić-Mažuranić (1874–1938)	Yugoslavia	novel, short story	Gavro Manojlović (1856–1939)
3	Gilbert Keith Chesterton (1874–1936)	United Kingdom	philosophy, theology, essays, literary criticism, novel, short story, poetry	Torsten Fogelqvist (1880–1941)
4	Violet Clifton (1883–1961)	United Kingdom	biography, essays	Nevill Coghill (1899–1980)
5	António Correia de Oliveira (1878–1960)	Portugal	poetry	Alfredo Carneiro da Cunha (1863–1942); Luís da Cunha Gonçalvez (1875–1956)
6	James Cousins (1873–1956)	Ireland; British India	poetry, drama, essays, literary criticism	Rabindranath Tagore (1861–1941)
7	Karel Čapek (1890–1938)	Czechoslovakia	drama, novel, short story, essays, literary criticism	Josef Pekař (1870–1937); Josef Šusta (1874–1945); Eight professors (Note: All eight were professors of history of literature at the University of Prague, Czechoslovakia.)
8	Maria Madalena de Martel Patrício (1884–1947)	Portugal	poetry, essays	Bento Carqueja (1860–1935)
9	Miguel de Unamuno (1864–1936)	Spain	novel, poetry, philosophy, essays, drama	Esteban Madruga Jiménez (1890–1980)
10	Roger Martin du Gard (1881–1958)	France	novel, drama, memoir	Torsten Fogelqvist (1880–1941); Anders Österling (1884–1981)
11	Olav Duun (1876–1939)	Norway	novel, short story	Halvdan Koht (1873–1965); Helga Eng (1875–1966)
12	James George Frazer (1854–1941)	United Kingdom	history, essays, translation	Jarl Charpentier (1884–1935)
13	Franz Karl Ginzkey (1871–1963)	Austria	poetry, short story, essays	Hjalmar Hammarskjöld (1862–1953)
14	Vilhelm Grønbech (1873–1948)	Denmark	history, essays, poetry	Sven Lönborg (1871–1959)
15	Jarl Hemmer (1893–1944)	Finland	poetry, novel	Hjalmar Hammarskjöld (1862–1953)
16	Ricarda Huch (1864–1947)	Germany	history, essays, novel, poetry	Ernst Robert Curtius (1886–1956)
17	Johannes V. Jensen (1873–1950)	Denmark	novel, short story, poetry	Vilhelm Andersen (1864–1953); Johannes Brøndum-Nielsen (1881–1977); Hans Brix (1870–1961); Carl Adolf Bodelsen (1894–1978)
18	Guðmundur Kamban (1888–1945)	Iceland	novel, drama	Bengt Hesselman (1875–1952)
19	Rudolf Kassner (1873–1959)	Austria	philosophy, essays, translation	6 professors of the University of Zurich
20	Erwin Guido Kolbenheyer (1878–1962)	Austria	novel, short story, poetry, drama	Hans-Friedrich Rosenfeld (1899–1993)
21	Sven Lönborg (1871–1959)	Sweden	philosophy, history, pedagogy, essays	Emil Rodhe (1863–1936)
22	John Masefield (1878–1967)	United Kingdom	poetry, drama, novel, short story, essays, autobiography	Anders Österling (1884–1981)
23	Émile Mâle (1862–1954)	France	history	Emil Rodhe (1863–1936)
24	Dmitry Merezhkovsky (1865–1941)	Soviet Union	novel, essays, poetry, drama	Sigurd Agrell (1881–1937)
25	Eugene O'Neill (1888–1953)	United States	drama	Martin Lamm (1880–1950)
26	Kostis Palamas (1859–1943)	Greece	poetry, essays	Three professors (Note: Three professors of literature and/or history from the University of Athens, Greece.); Verner von Heidenstam (1859–1940)
27	Sarvepalli Radhakrishnan (1888–1975)	India	philosophy, essays, law	Hjalmar Hammarskjöld (1862–1953)
28	Víctor Manuel Rendón (1859–1940)	Ecuador	novel, poetry, drama, biography, essays, translation	Celiano Monge Navarrete (1856–1940)
29	Elise Richter (1865–1943)	Austria	philology	Antonin Duraffour (1879–1956); Carlo Tagliavini (1903–1982)
30	Jules Romains (1885–1972)	France	poetry, drama, screenplay	Fredrik Böök (1883–1961)
31	Frans Eemil Sillanpää (1888–1964)	Finland	novel, short story, poetry	Björn Collinder (1894–1983); Eemil Nestor Setälä (1864–1935); Yrjö Hirn (1870–1952); Rafael Erich (1879–1946)
32	Hermann Stehr (1864–1940)	Germany	novel, short story, poetry, drama	Hermann August Korff (1882–1963)
33	Dezső Szabó (1879–1945)	Hungary	novel, essays	Björn Collinder (1894–1983)
34	Shaul Tchernichovsky (1875–1943)	Soviet Union; Mandatory Palestine	poetry, essays, translation	Joseph Klausner (1874–1958)
35	Paul Valéry (1871–1945)	France	poetry, philosophy, essays, drama	Andreas Hofgaard Winsnes (1889–1972); Samson Eitrem (1872–1966); Peter Rokseth (1891–1945); Jens Thiis (1870–1942)
36	Edvarts Virza (1883–1940)	Latvia	poetry, essays, translation	Francis Balodis (1882–1947); Ludis Bērzin̦š (1870–1965)
37	Herbert George Wells (1866–1946)	United Kingdom	novel, short story, essays, history, biography	Sigfrid Siwertz (1882–1970)
38	Tadeusz Stefan Zieliński (1859–1944)	Poland	philology, history, translation, essays	Several professors at the University of Warsaw

=== Prize decision ===
In 1935, considered authors by the Nobel committee included Karel Čapek, Miguel de Unamuno, John Masefield, G. K. Chesterton, H. G. Wells, Jarl Hemmer, Johannes V. Jensen, Paul Valéry, Eugene O'Neill and Roger Martin du Gard, but the committee found that no candidate met the criteria for the prize. In their report to the Swedish Academy, Čapek was noted for his "thriving imagination and inventiveness" but dismissed for his "solubility and emptiness in philosophical contemplation", De Unamuno was acknowledged as the greatest Spanish writer alive and that his candidacy should be seriously considered, but was dismissed for his abstract ideas in his literary oeuvres; Masefield was dismissed for his uneven works; Du Gard was praised for his The Thibaults, but the committee decided to wait for its other volumes; Valéry was dismissed for being too obscure, Wells for not having produced anything significant in recent years and Chesterton because of "The high value of much of his preaching and the almost unparalleled critical acumen he possesses have been offset by a heavy burden of feverishly nervous, hasty, and distorted judgments and views."

Committee member Hjalmar Hammarskjöld did not agree with the Nobel committee's conclusion that none of the candidates met the criteria for being awarded the prize and added a divergent opinion: "Since I have not been able to agree to the committee's request, I need not plead any other reason than that the committee in any event seems to me to have set far too strict requirements for competence for the Nobel Prize, requirements so strict that they could not be implemented during the past period, and that their maintenance in the future would certainly make the awarding of the Nobel Prize a rare occurrence." Hammarskjöld proposed that the Nobel Prize in Literature for 1935 should be awarded to Miguel de Unamuno, with Jarl Hemmer as his second proposal.

On 14 November 1935 the Swedish Academy decided that the Nobel Prize in Literature for 1935 should be reserved to the following year.
