= Dezső Szabó =

Dezső Szabó is the name of:

- Dezső Szabó (writer) (1879–1945), Hungarian writer
- Dezső Szabó (athlete) (born 1967), Hungarian decathlete
