= Straumēni =

1933 poem by Edvarts Virza

- Author: Edvarts Virza
- Language: Latvian
- Genre: Prose poem
- Set in: Zemgale, 19th century
- Publisher: Valters un Rapa
- Publication date: 1933
- Publication place: Riga

Straumēni is a prose poem by Latvian writer Edvarts Virza, published as a book in 1933. The novel is set in 19th-century Zemgale and describes the life of a single farming household throughout the year, celebrating the work-related festivals. As there is very little dialogue and the plot does not follow any single character, the novel concentrates on the life of the farm as a whole.

== Content and style ==
After an untitled introduction, the book is divided into 4 parts: the spring, summer, autumn and winter, following the cycle of a year on a farm, with a group of workers, headed by a farmer, sowing fields, mowing hay, preserving harvest for winter, cutting firewood for the cold months. There are descriptions of midsummer celebrations with folk songs and dances on the farm, of landscape changes, especially of the spring floods.

Virza’s narrator of third-person perspective guides the reader through the farm and the surrounding countryside of old times, describing generations of farmers and their families living and working on this land. The life of the household and its work is more important than the lives of individual characters. Domestic and wild animals, plants and crops all belong to the same community.

The people of the farm household read the Bible and go to church. Māra, a deity of Latvian folk belief, also appears in the work. In Sigita Kušnere’s interpretation, the description of church worship services is marked by restraint, whereas the loud and joyful folk songs and dances are represented after communal work. As Alina Romanovska stressed, in the given poem work and faith are closely connected, and death is portrayed as a part of life’s cycle and therefore is not tragic.

== Writing and publication ==
Virza started writing Straumēni in the late 1920s. Parts of the novel were published in the magazine Daugava in 1929-1933. The complete work was published in Riga in 1933 by Valters un Rapa. In his time, Virza developed his earlier rural writing into a novel in prose. An unfinished poem in hexameters begun by him before the First World War was a precursor to this work. Prose sketches from his Zaļā Zemgale (1923) were also precursors to the novel. The Latvian subtitle of the novel, Vecā Zemgales māja gada gaitās, has been translated into English as The Story of an Old Farm in Zemgale through the Changing Seasons.

Edvarts Virza supported Kārlis Ulmanis and was an advocate of an agricultural Latvia to be ruled by one party under the strong hand of a leader. The author’s work was published in the year before Ulmanis’s coup d’etat in 1934.

Straumēni was removed from bookstores and from school and public libraries under Soviet rule. The book was re-published by Liesma in 1989. Imants Ziedonis wrote the preface to the new edition. To date, Straumēni has been translated into German, Russian, Estonian, French, Croatian and Czech. A new German version of the book was published by Guggolz in 2020, translated by Berthold Forssman. The afterword to the new edition is also written by this translator.

== Reception and adaptations ==
Literary historian Juris Rozītis calls Straumēni one of the major works of literature written in Latvia between the wars. He describes the book as a lyrical novel written in the spirit of Latvian folk song, as prose in which is depicted agricultural work of peasants and, interwoven with description of it, peasants’ mythology and the cycle of life and death.

Reviewing Straumēni’s German translation published in 2020, Jörg Plath of Frankfurter Allgemeine Zeitung writes about the book as nature writing, commending the author for vivid descriptions of nature. At the same time, however, the author of the review notes an important limit of the idyllic representation of life by the farm household: even though the people in the novel have little fear of illness or death, they still have to work hard in the fields and forests.

Christiane Schäfer in her review for ReadOst considers that the mystical elements of Straumēni prevent the book from being simply an escape into an idyllic rural past. She also suggests that the idea of the Latvian people presented by the author in his work could be seen as vague or problematic.

The Straumēni work has been adapted for television, theater and film several times. In 1989 a production of the work was made for Latvian Television by Virdžīnija Lejiņa. In 2010 a stage version of the work was premiered at the Valmiera Drama Theatre by director Viesturs Meikšāns. A film adaptation of the same concept was also made by Meikšāns in 2014, together with Dzintars Dreibergs.
