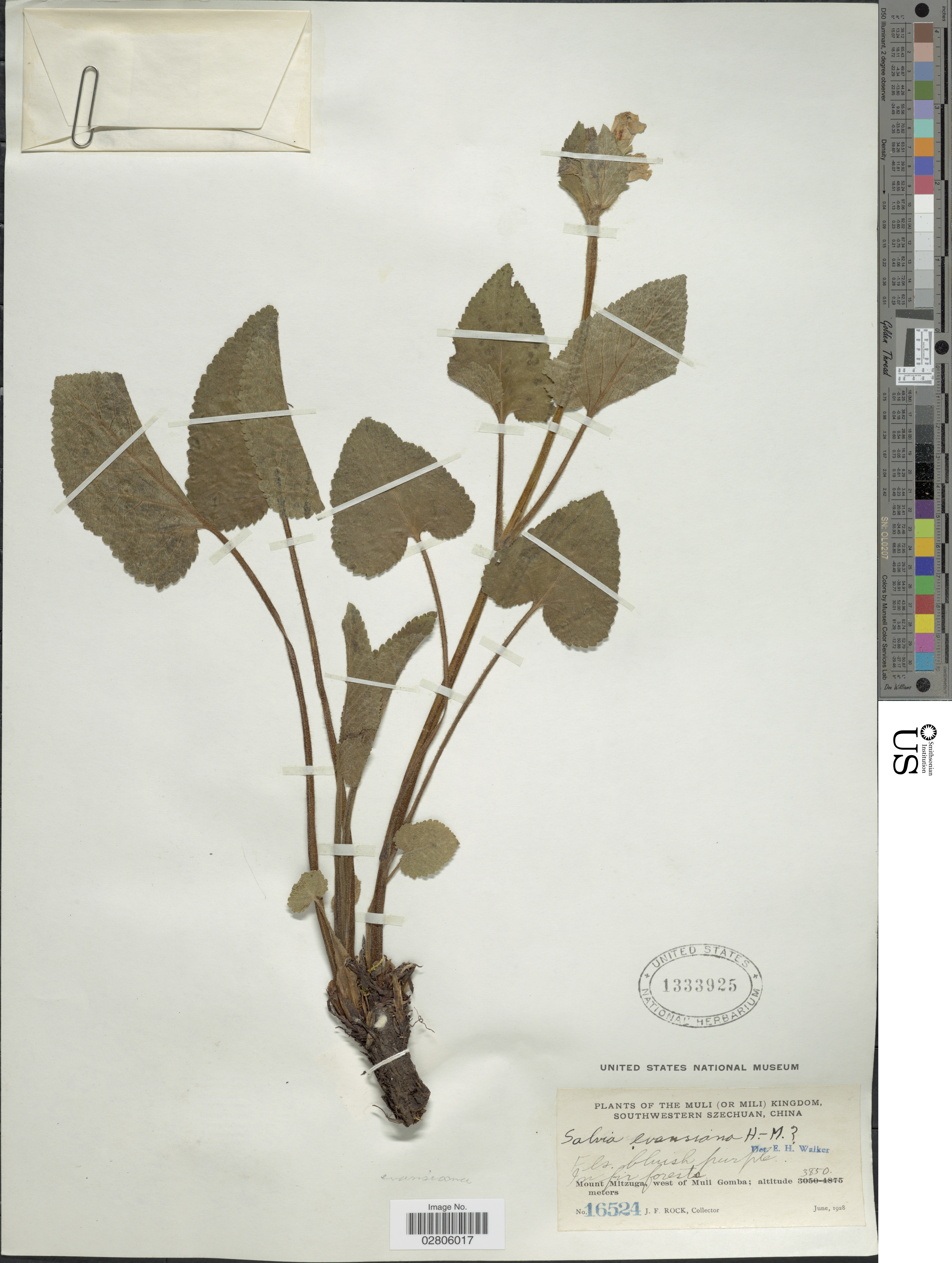

Scientific classification
- Kingdom: Plantae
- Clade: Tracheophytes
- Clade: Angiosperms
- Clade: Eudicots
- Clade: Asterids
- Order: Lamiales
- Family: Lamiaceae
- Genus: Salvia
- Species: S. evansiana

Binomial name
- Salvia evansiana Hand.-Mazz.

Varieties
- S. evansiana var. evansiana; S. evansiana var. scaposa E. Peter

= Salvia evansiana =

Species of flowering plant

Salvia evansiana (the Snow Mountain sage) is a perennial plant that is native to Sichuan and Yunnan provinces in China, found growing on alpine meadows, hillsides, and forests at elevations from 3,400 to 4,300 m (11,200 to 14,100 ft). It has erect stems growing 13 to 45 cm (5.1 to 17.7 in) tall, with ovate to triangular-ovate leaves that are 2 to 11 cm (0.79 to 4.33 in) long and 1 to 11 cm (0.39 to 4.33 in) wide.

Inflorescences are racemes or panicles that are 10 to 20 cm (3.9 to 7.9 in) long, with a straight corolla that is 2.6 to 3.5 cm (1.0 to 1.4 in) long.

There are two varieties, with slight differences in bract and calyx size. The most notable difference is in the color of the corolla: Salvia evansiana var. evansiana has a flower that is blue-purple, with some yellow at the base. Salvia evansiana var. scaposa has a white or cream-yellow flower.
