= Quercus senescens =

Conservation status
- Least Concern (IUCN 3.1)

Scientific classification
- Kingdom: Plantae
- Clade: Embryophytes
- Clade: Tracheophytes
- Clade: Spermatophytes
- Clade: Angiosperms
- Clade: Eudicots
- Clade: Rosids
- Order: Fagales
- Family: Fagaceae
- Genus: Quercus
- Subgenus: Quercus subg. Cerris
- Section: Quercus sect. Ilex
- Species: Q. senescens

Binomial name
- Quercus senescens Hand.-Mazz.

Varieties
- Quercus senescens var. muliensis (Hu) Y.C.Hsu & H.Wei Jen; Quercus senescens var. senescens

Species of flowering plant

Quercus senescens is a species of oak. It is a tree native to the eastern Himalayas, northeastern India, Tibet, and south-central China.

Two varieties are accepted.

- Quercus senescens var. muliensis (Hu) Y.C.Hsu & H.Wei Jen (synonym Quercus muliensis Hu) – Yunnan
- Quercus senescens var. senescens

The species was first described by Heinrich von Handel-Mazzetti in 1929.
