= Quercus monimotricha =

Conservation status
- Least Concern (IUCN 3.1)

Scientific classification
- Kingdom: Plantae
- Clade: Embryophytes
- Clade: Tracheophytes
- Clade: Spermatophytes
- Clade: Angiosperms
- Clade: Eudicots
- Clade: Rosids
- Order: Fagales
- Family: Fagaceae
- Genus: Quercus
- Subgenus: Quercus subg. Cerris
- Section: Quercus sect. Ilex
- Species: Q. monimotricha

Binomial name
- Quercus monimotricha (Hand.-Mazz.) Hand.-Mazz.

Synonyms
- Quercus spinosa var. monimotricha Hand.-Mazz.

Species of flowering plant

Quercus monimotricha is a species of oak. It is a shrub native to south-central China and northern Myanmar.

It was first described as Quercus spinosa var. monimotricha by Heinrich von Handel-Mazzetti in 1925. In 1929 Handel-Mazzetti designated it a full species as Q. monimotricha.
