= Allium ovalifolium =

卵叶山葱 luan ye shan cong

Scientific classification
- Kingdom: Plantae
- Clade: Tracheophytes
- Clade: Angiosperms
- Clade: Monocots
- Order: Asparagales
- Family: Amaryllidaceae
- Subfamily: Allioideae
- Genus: Allium
- Subgenus: A. subg. Anguinum
- Species: A. ovalifolium

Binomial name
- Allium ovalifolium Hand.-Mazz.

Synonyms
- Allium prattii var. latifoliatum F.T.Wang & Tang; Allium cordifolium J.M.Xu

Species of plant

Allium ovalifolium is a Chinese species of onion widely cultivated as an ornamental in other regions. It grows at elevations of 1500–4000 m. The Tibetan people of Shangri-La and nearby areas eat its scapes.

Allium ovalifolium produces narrow cylindrical bulbs. Scapes are up to 60 cm tall, round in cross-section. Leaves are flat, lanceolate to ovate, up to 15 cm long by 7 cm wide. Umbel is spherical, densely crowded with many white or pale red flowers.

Varieties

- Allium ovalifolium var. cordifolium (J.M.Xu) J.M.Xu - Sichuan
- Allium ovalifolium var. leuconeurum J.M.Xu - Sichuan
- Allium ovalifolium var. ovalifolium - Gansu, Guizhou, Hubei, Qinghai, Shaanxi, Sichuan, Yunnan
