= Quercus rehderiana =

Conservation status
- Least Concern (IUCN 3.1)

Scientific classification
- Kingdom: Plantae
- Clade: Embryophytes
- Clade: Tracheophytes
- Clade: Spermatophytes
- Clade: Angiosperms
- Clade: Eudicots
- Clade: Rosids
- Order: Fagales
- Family: Fagaceae
- Genus: Quercus
- Subgenus: Quercus subg. Cerris
- Section: Quercus sect. Ilex
- Species: Q. rehderiana

Binomial name
- Quercus rehderiana Hand.-Mazz.

Synonyms
- Craibiodendron forrestii W.W.Sm.; Quercus dilatata var. yunnanensis Schottky; Quercus pseudosemecarpifolia A.Camus; Quercus semecarpifolia subsp. glabra (Franch.) Hand.-Mazz.; Quercus semecarpifolia var. glabra Franch.

Species of flowering plant

Quercus rehderiana is a species of oak. It is a tree native to Tibet and to Guizhou, Sichuan, and Yunnan provinces of south-central China.

The species was described by Heinrich von Handel-Mazzetti in 1925.
