= Chaochienchangia =

Scientific classification
- Kingdom: Plantae
- Clade: Tracheophytes
- Clade: Angiosperms
- Clade: Eudicots
- Clade: Asterids
- Order: Asterales
- Family: Asteraceae
- Subfamily: Asteroideae
- Tribe: Astereae
- Genus: Chaochienchangia; G.L.Nesom
- Species: C. falcifolia

Binomial name
- Chaochienchangia falcifolia (Hand.-Mazz.) G.L.Nesom

Synonyms
- Aster brachyphyllus C.C.Chang; Aster falcifolius Hand.-Mazz. (1937) (basionym)

Genus of flowering plants

Chaochienchangia is a genus of flowering plants in the family Asteraceae. It includes a single species, Chaochienchangia falcifolia, which is native to central China.
