= Quercus longispica =

Conservation status
- Least Concern (IUCN 3.1)

Scientific classification
- Kingdom: Plantae
- Clade: Embryophytes
- Clade: Tracheophytes
- Clade: Spermatophytes
- Clade: Angiosperms
- Clade: Eudicots
- Clade: Rosids
- Order: Fagales
- Family: Fagaceae
- Genus: Quercus
- Subgenus: Quercus subg. Cerris
- Section: Quercus sect. Ilex
- Species: Q. longispica

Binomial name
- Quercus longispica (Hand.-Mazz.) A.Camus

Synonyms
- Quercus semecarpifolia var. longispica Hand.-Mazz.

Species of flowering plant

Quercus longispica is a species of oak. It is a tree native to Sichuan and Yunnan provinces of south-central China.

The taxon was first described as Quercus semecarpifolia var. longispica by Heinrich von Handel-Mazzetti in 1929. In 1934 Aimée Antoinette Camus described it as the full species Q. longispica.
