= Quercus oxyphylla =

Conservation status
- Near Threatened (IUCN 3.1)

Scientific classification
- Kingdom: Plantae
- Clade: Embryophytes
- Clade: Tracheophytes
- Clade: Spermatophytes
- Clade: Angiosperms
- Clade: Eudicots
- Clade: Rosids
- Order: Fagales
- Family: Fagaceae
- Genus: Quercus
- Subgenus: Quercus subg. Cerris
- Section: Quercus sect. Ilex
- Species: Q. oxyphylla

Binomial name
- Quercus oxyphylla (E.H.Wilson) Hand.-Mazz.

Synonyms
- Quercus spathulata var. oxyphylla E.H.Wilson

Species of flowering plant

Quercus oxyphylla is a species of oak. It is a tree native to north-central and southern China. It is a large evergreen tree which grows in mixed subtropical forests from 200 to 2,000 metres elevation.

The taxon was first described as Quercus spathulata var. oxyphylla by Ernest Henry Wilson in 1927. In 1929 Heinrich von Handel-Mazzetti described it as the species Q. oxyphylla.
