= Cécile Tormay =

Hungarian writer, intellectual and antisemitic political activist

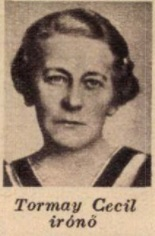
- Cécile Tormay in Napkelet lexikon
- Born: 8 October 1875 or 1976
- Died: 2 April 1937
- Occupations: writer, translator, activist and social theorist
- Writing career
- Notable works: Emberek a kövek között, 1911; A Régi ház, 1914

Cécile Tormay (8 October 1875 or 1976 – 2 April 1937) was a Hungarian writer, intellectual, far-right political activist, literary translator, and social theorist.

== Early life ==
Tormay was born in Budapest into a German speaking family that assimilated into Hungarian culture. Her father, Béla Tormay (1839-1906), was widely recognized as an expert on agriculture. He served as a member of the Hungarian Academy of Sciences and a State Secretary. A private student, Cécile studied literary works in German, Italian, French and Latin. She translated the Little Flowers of St. Francis of Assisi into Hungarian.

== Literary career ==
Her first two novels were People of the Rocks (Emberek a kövek között, 1911) and The Old House (A Régi ház, 1914). She also wrote five short stories. Her best known work is 1923's Bujdosó könyv, which is translated literally as The Proscribed Book, but an English translation was published as An Outlaw's Diary. It provides a hostile account of the 1918–1919 revolution and the subsequent Hungarian Soviet Republic led by Béla Kun. She also bemoaned the division of the Kingdom of Hungary which led to territorial concessions to the Kingdom of Romania. This book is cited as evidence of Tormay's antisemitism as she claims that "The demon of the revolution is not an individual, not a party, but a race among the races. The Jews are the last people of the Ancient East who survived among the newer peoples of shorter history."

She was nominated and considered for the Nobel Prize in Literature in 1936. Nobel committee member Fredrik Böök pushed for a prize to Tormay, arguing that "her writing is of exceptionally high value. (...) I cannot currently find any choice that is more satisfactory and urgent", but her candidacy was ultimately passed over by the Nobel committee. Tormay was nominated for the prize again in 1937, the year she died.

In 1936 she became a member of the International Institute of Intellectual Co-operation.

== Private life ==
Cécile Tormay never married, did not have children, worked as an independent writer, and led a traditionally “male” life. It was in stark contrast to her radical right-wing political positions in favor of the traditional family. She became a part of a big public scandal when on 30 October 1923, Count Rafael Zichy filed for divorce with his wife, Countess Eduardina Pallavicini (daughter of the economist Ede Pallavicini), based on charges of an “unnatural” relationship between his wife and Cecilé Tormay. This relationship caused a great scandal at the time and was widely commented on by the contemporary press to the point that the two women, to protect their image, decided to sue Count Zichy who was eventually—on the personal intervention of Miklós Horthy himself—sentenced to one and a half years in prison. Despite the colossal legal documentation of the case, the only materials that survived were the decisions and sentencing of the courts and the testimonials of the servants. None of the minutes, expert opinions, and testimonials of prominent witnesses survived. The servants referred to Tormay as csira, a sprout - a rural dialect word, widely used to describe and conceptualize non-normative sexualities there (as servants claimed that Tormay loved Pallavicini "like a man").

Countess Pallavicini, however, was not the only woman in Tormay's life: as a young woman she travelled Europe with an Italian woman, Francesca D’Orsay, for fifteen years before the war. In the last decade of her life, she lived with Count Lajosné Ambrózy-Migazzi in Mátraháza, in the villa they bought together.

== Far-right figure ==
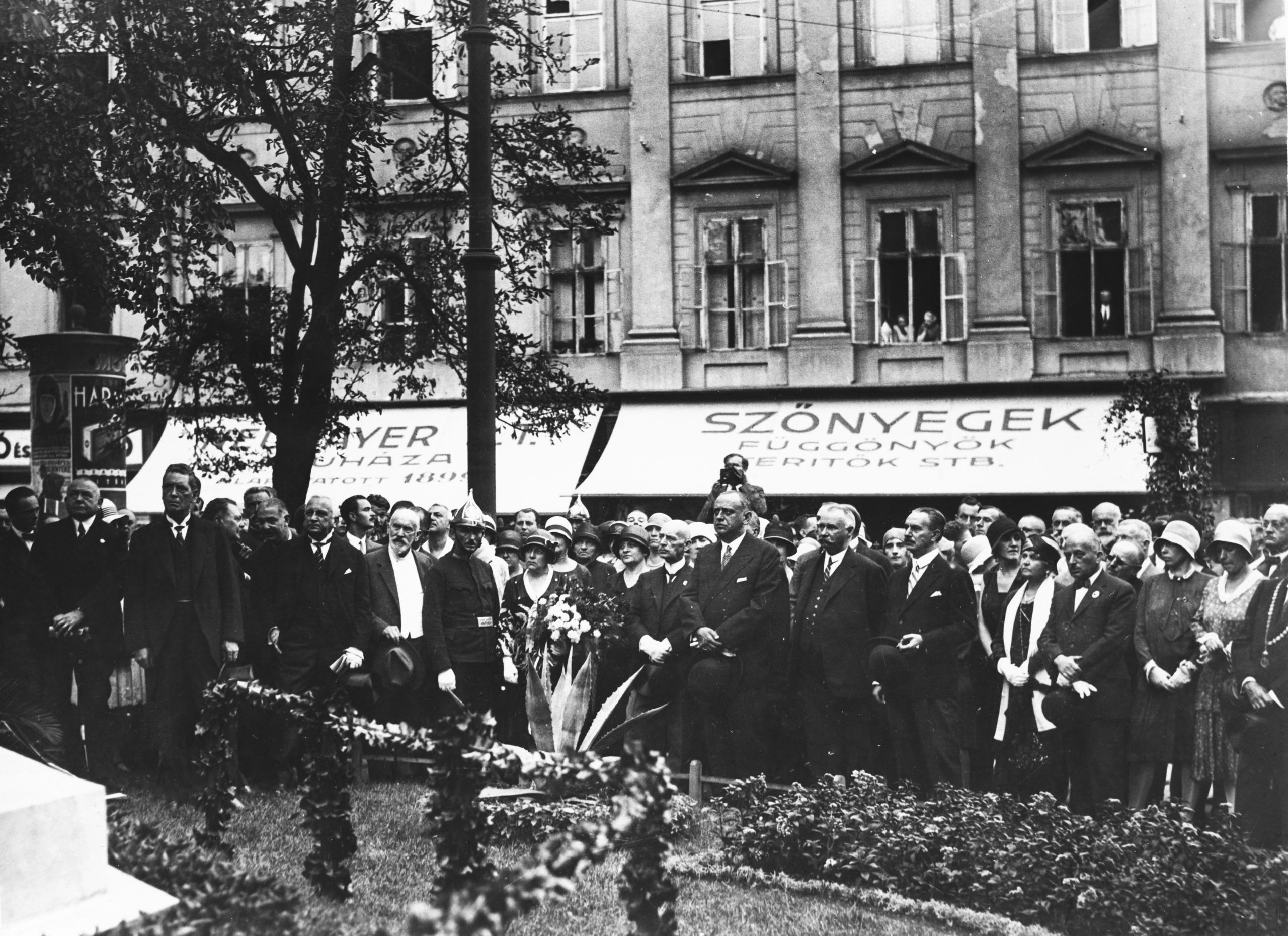
In 1929

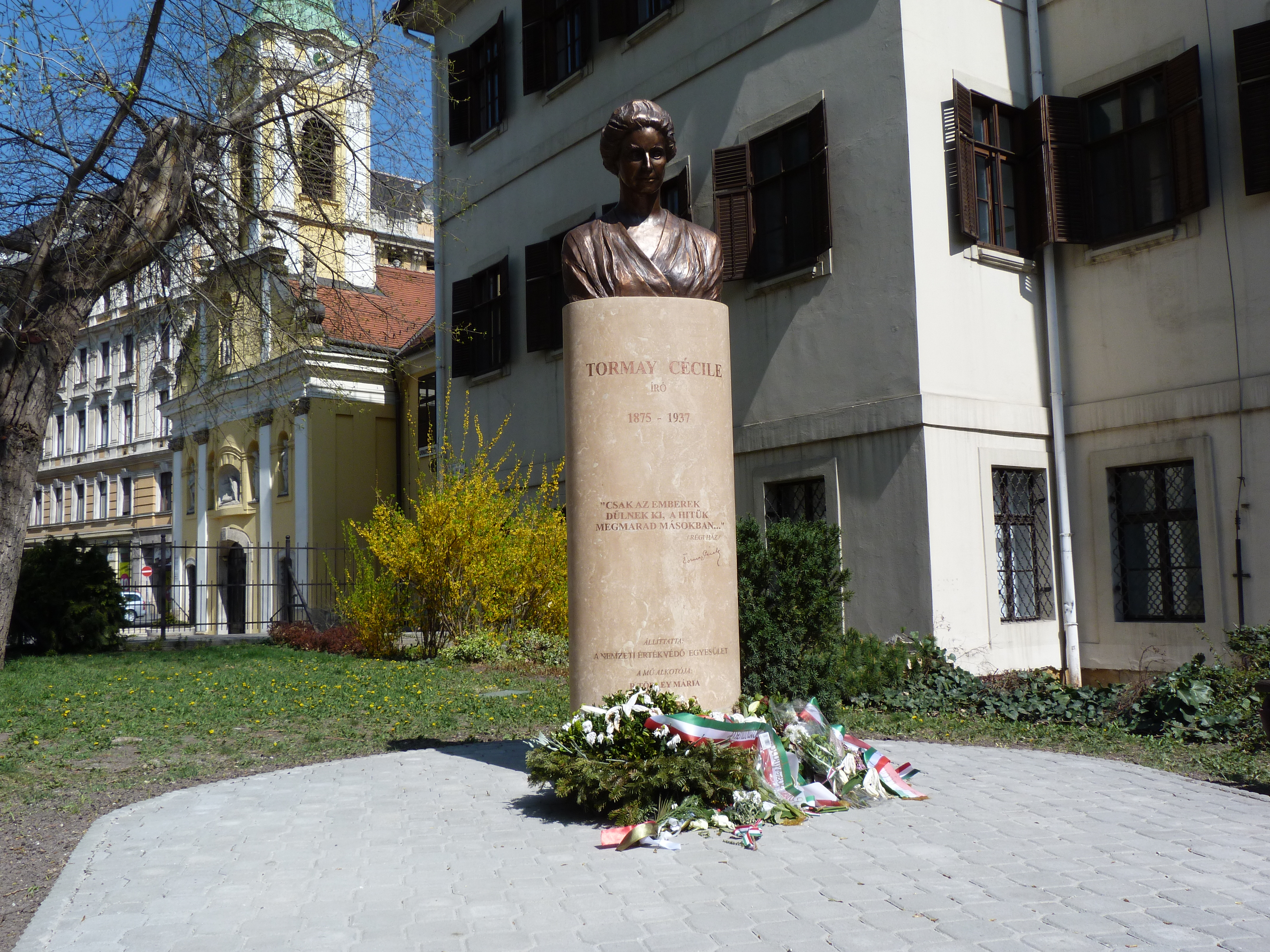
Bust of Cécile Tormay in Budapest

She was a great admirer of Benito Mussolini. In 1932, on the tenth anniversary of the March on Rome, she met the Italian dictator, presenting him the good wishes of her Hungarian women's league in a speech in Italian.

From the 1990s Tormay has been revived by political groups such as Jobbik, who share her far-right and antisemitic views. Gábor Vona praised her in a speech made in November 2009. In 2012 Fidesz, the party of the governing coalition, also was promoting Tormay. Máté Kocsis and Sándor Lezsák, both Fidesz members of the National Assembly of Hungary unveiled a statue of Tormay, hailing her as a “great patriot". This was followed by an attempt to rename streets in Budapest after such antisemites as Tormay and József Nyírő, a member of the Nazi Arrow Cross Party. However, following an international outcry, István Tarlós, the mayor of Budapest, suspended this initiative.

== Sources ==
- An outlaw's diary (1923), vol. 1, vol. 2
- Budapest wants to name a street after the antisemitic writer (in German, cites Tormay in English)
- Jewish federation asks Budapest mayor to withdraw renaming of street after alleged anti-Semite
