= Nya Doxa =

Nya Doxa is a Swedish book publisher. Founded in 1990 when it took over parts of the book stock from the bankrupt publishing company Doxa. They publish mostly books within humanities and social science. They have previously published about 25–30 new titles a year, but later moved towards published 10–12 books per year instead.

Nya Doxa puts focus on publishing titles of good scientific quality, both the specialized kind and more popular books targeted at a wider public audience. They have occasionally published fiction, but largely keeps to non-fiction. The publishing house both publishes books by Swedish writers and translations from English, German and French. They also distribute books for other small publishers.

Among the contemporary authors published by the publisher are Nobel Prize winner J.M. Coetzee, Vladimir Oravsky, Salomon Schulman, Fredrik Sjöberg, Peter Gärdenfors, Carl Reinhold Bråkenhielm and Svante Nordin.

Nya Doxa is located in the Swedish town of Nora, where it moved in 1989 as CEO David Stansvik's wife had family there. Stensvik also owned the bookshop in Nora, but sold it in 2007.
