= Svante Nordin =

Swedish historian of ideas and author (born 1946)

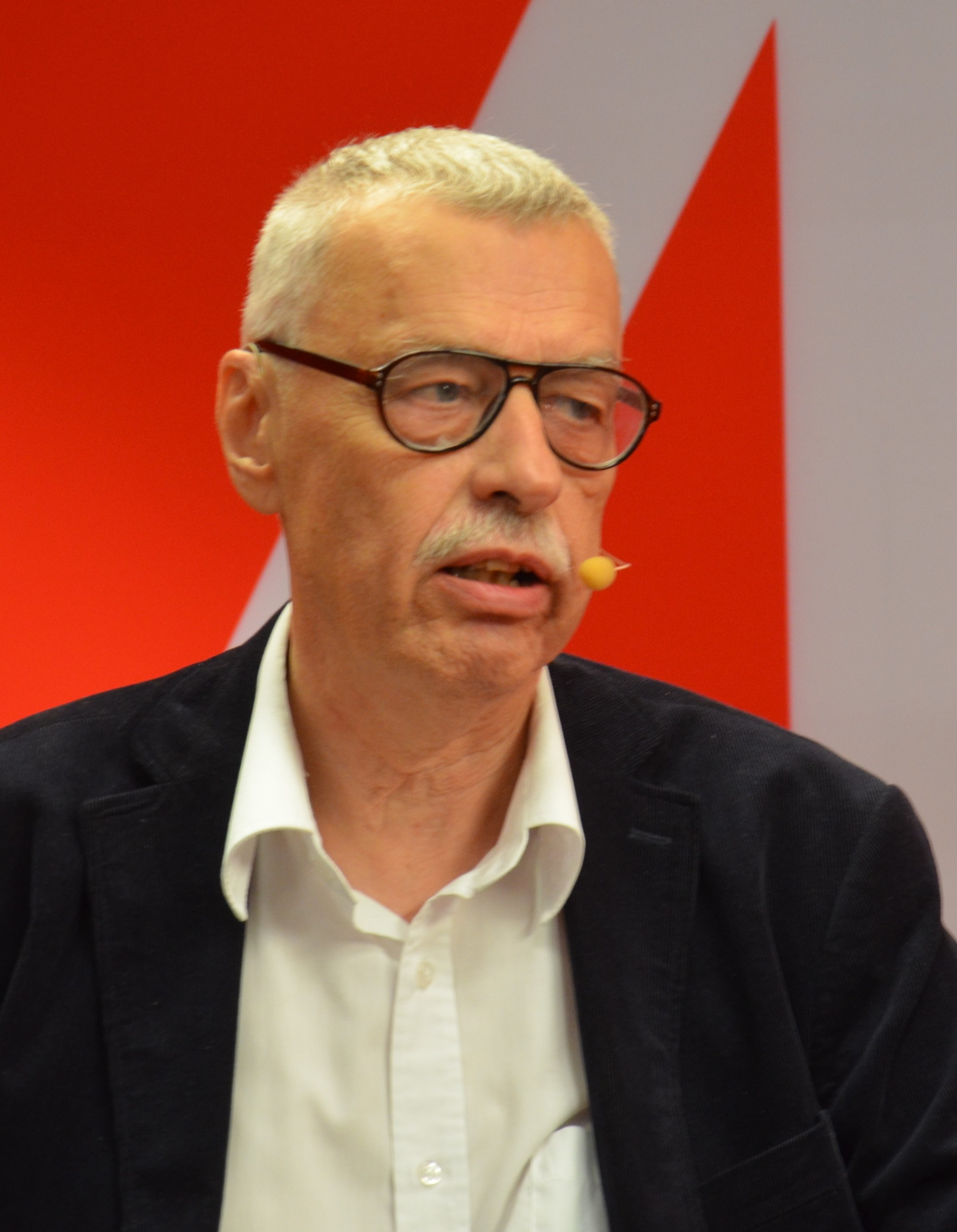
Svante Nordin (2014)

Per Svante Gudmund Nordin (born April 18, 1946) is a Swedish historian of ideas and author. He is a professor of history of ideas at Lund University.

With his dissertation Interpretation and method. Studies in the explication of literature (1978) Nordin became a PhD in theoretical philosophy. In 1981 he became an associate professor in history of ideas and in 1999 a full professor in the same discipline.

During the 1980s his research was focused on the history of philosophy and he wrote a groundbreaking work on the history of Swedish philosophy during the 1800s and 1900s. From the 1990s on, he has mainly focused on cultural currents during the 1900s. His book Filosofernas krig was nominated for the August Prize. Nordin has written several textbooks in philosophy and the history of ideas. When he turned 60 he was honored with a festschrift, Filosofiska citat.

== Bibliography ==
- Interpretation and method. Studies in the explication of literature, Lund, 1978.
- Den Boströmska skolan och den svenska idealismens fall, Lund: Doxa, 1981. ISBN 91-578-0102-9
- Historia och vetenskap. En essä om marxismen, historicismen och humaniora, Lund: Zenit, 1981. ISBN 91-85876-16-X
- Från Hägerström till Hedenius. Den moderna svenska filosofin, Bodafors: Doxa, 1984. ISBN 91-578-0183-5
- Romantikens filosofi. Svensk idealism från Höijer till hegelianerna, Lund: Doxa, 1987. ISBN 91-578-0242-4
- Från tradition till apokalyps. Historieskrivning och civilisationskritik i det moderna Europa, Stockholm: Symposion, 1989. ISBN 91-7868-161-8
- Fredrik Böök. En levnadsteckning, Stockholm: Natur & Kultur, 1994. ISBN 91-27-03845-9
- Filosofins historia. Det västerländska förnuftets äventyr från Thales till postmodernismen, Lund: Studentlitteratur, 1995 (utökad uppl. 2003). ISBN 91-44-31851-0
- Det pessimistiska förnuftet. Filosofiska essäer och porträtt, Nora: Nya Doxa, 1996. ISBN 91-88248-70-4
- Filosofernas krig. Den europeiska filosofin under första världskriget, Nora: Nya Doxa, 1998. ISBN 91-578-0052-9
- Det politiska tänkandets historia, Lund: Studentlitteratur, 1999 (utökad uppl. 2006). ISBN 91-44-00653-5
- "Förlåt jag blott citerar." Om citatets historia, Nora: Nya Doxa, 2001. ISBN 91-578-0368-4
- Ingemar Hedenius. En filosof och hans tid, Stockholm: Natur & Kultur, 2004. ISBN 91-27-09915-6
- Nittonhundratalet. En biografi. Makter, människor och idéer under ett århundrade, Stockholm: Atlantis, 2005. ISBN 91-7353-076-X
- Globaliseringens idéhistoria, Lund: Studentlitteratur, 2006. ISBN 91-44-00421-4
- Humaniora i Sverige – Framväxt – Guldålder – Kris, Stockholm: Atlantis, 2008. ISBN 91-7353-225-8
- Fyra som förde krig, Stockholm: Atlantis, 2009. ISBN 91-7353-337-8
- Filosoferna. Det västerländska tänkandet sedan år 1900, Stockholm: Atlantis, 2011. ISBN 978-91-7353-480-2
- Drottningen och filosofen. Mötet mellan Christina och Descartes Atlantis, 2012
- Winston. Churchill och den brittiska världsordningens slut Atlantis, 2013
- Sven Stolpe. Blåsten av ett temperament Atlantis, 2014
- Filosoferna. Den moderna världens födelse och det västerländska tänkandet 1776–1900, Natur & Kultur, 2016.
- Efter revolutionen. Vänstern i svensk kulturdebatt sedan 1968 (med Lennart Berntson) Stockholm: Natur & kultur, 2017
- Hitlers München, Natur & kultur, 2018
- Filosofins litterära formvärld och andra studier, Axess Publishing, 2018
- Sveriges moderna historia. Fem politiska projekt 1809-2019, Natur & kultur, 2019
- Tanke och dröm. Svensk idéhistoria från 1900, Timbro, 2021
- Filosoferna. Vetenskaplig revolution och upplysning 1650-1776 Fri Tanke, 2022
- Världsandens partisaner. Filosoferna, tredje riket och den liberala demokratin, Fri Tanke, 2023
- Filosoferna. Från filosofins födelse till den vetenskapliga revolutionen ca. 500 f.Kr.–1650, Fri Tanke, 2025
