= Ingemar Hedenius =

Swedish philosopher

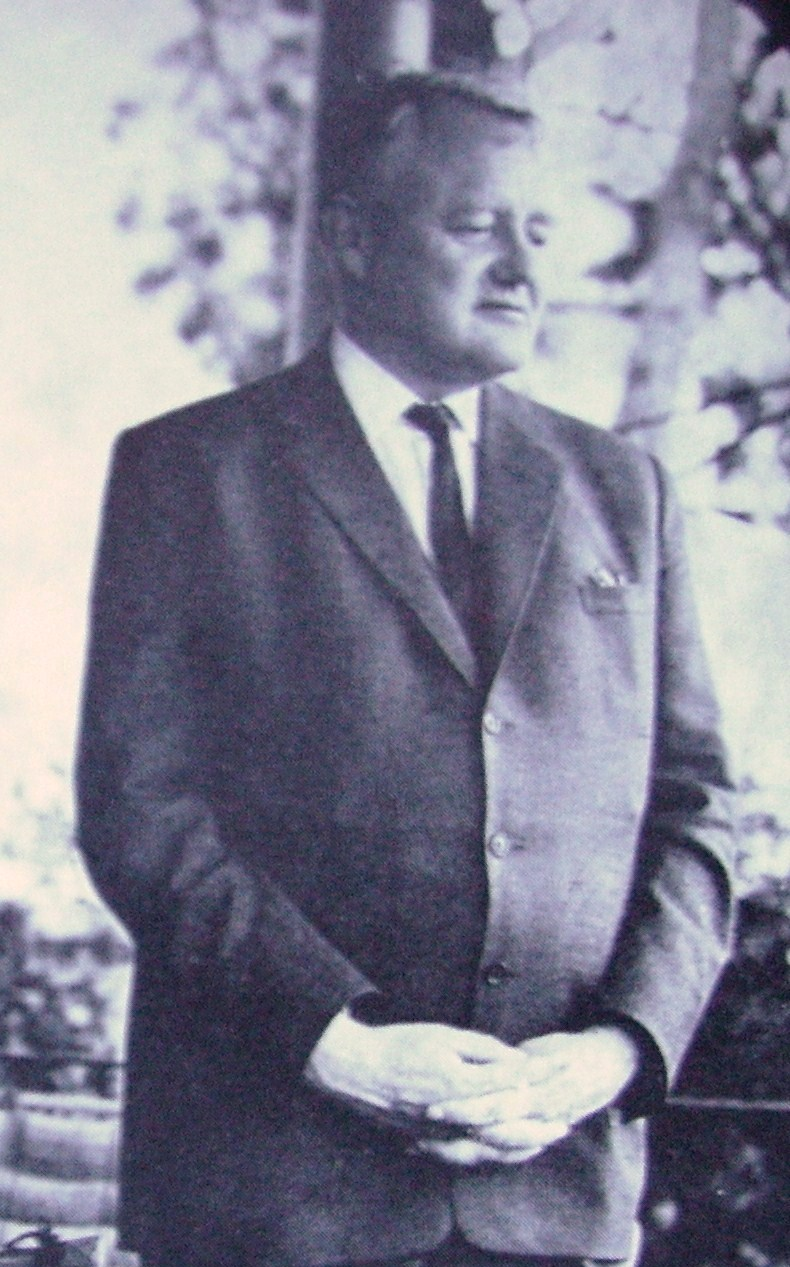
- Born: 5 April 1908
- Died: 30 April 1982 (aged 74)
- Father: Israel Hedenius

Academic background
- Education: Uppsala University
- Thesis: Sensationalism and theology in Berkeley's philosophy

Academic work
- Discipline: philosophy
- Institutions: Uppsala University
- Notable works: Tro och vetande

Per Arvid Ingemar Hedenius (5 April 1908 – 30 April 1982) was a Swedish philosopher. He was Professor of Practical Philosophy at Uppsala University (1947–1973). He was a famous opponent of organised Christianity. The Swedish Humanist Association, known in Sweden as "Humanisterna", offers the Ingemar Hedenius Award each year to support humanist ideas and critical thinking.

== Background ==
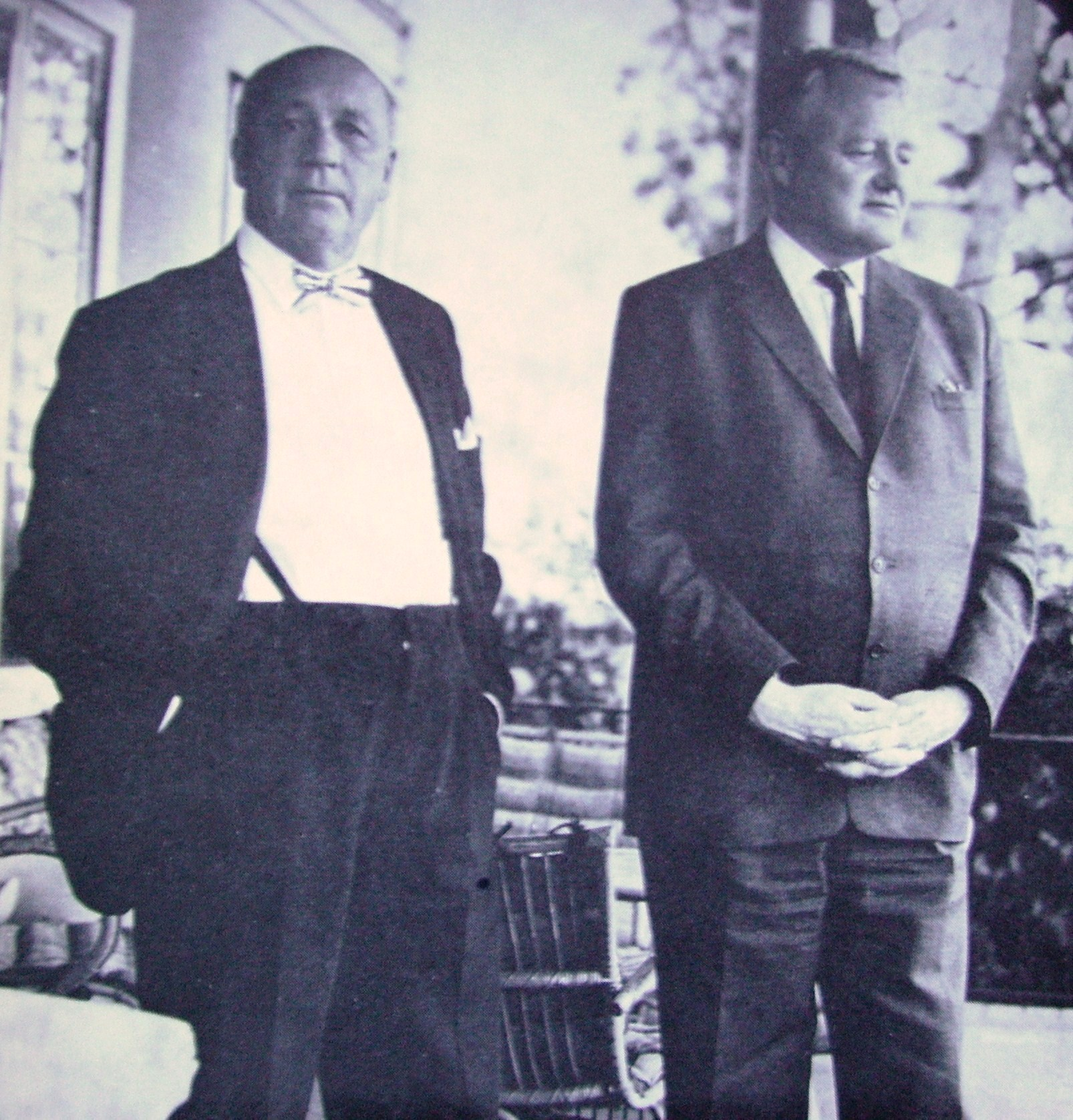
Herbert Tingsten and Ingemar Hedenius in 1974

Ingemar Hedenius was born on 5 April 1908 in Stockholm, Sweden. His grandfather Per Hedenius was a famous professor of pathology and for a while rector of Uppsala University. His father Israel Hedenius was in 1900 a doctor of medicine and teacher of medical practice, and in 1927 was appointed personal physician to the King of Sweden. Hedenius' mother, born Anna Bergh, was from an upper class Norwegian family.

The two married in 1905 and had three children: Per (1905), Ingemar and Ann Marie (1909). Both parents were very religious.

Ingemar took the entrance examination for the Norra Latin school in 1927. After he completed upper secondary school, he studied at Uppsala University where he wrote his doctoral thesis, Sensationalism and theology in Berkeley's philosophy, on the philosophy of George Berkeley (1936). On 8 June 1979, Hedenius received an honorary doctorate from the Faculty of Theology at Uppsala University, Sweden.

Svante Nordin, a professor of history of science and ideas at Lund University, published a book in 2004 called Ingemar Hedenius: en filosof och hans tid (Ingemar Hedenius: a philosopher and his time). It portrays a picture of Ingemar Hedenius based on a rich collection of letters and other documents. According to the text at the back of the book, Hedenius was "a person with strong musical, artistic and literary interests. He liked to play the flute, including performing in public. [...] harsh both in writing and in speech with enemies and opponents, gentle and sensitive with his friends."

Hedenius was, from 1957 to 1960, a publisher of the bimonthly magazine Kulturkontakt, a publication of the CIA-backed Congress of Cultural Freedom and the Svenska kommittén för kulturens frihet (Swedish Committee for Cultural Freedom). He died on 30 April 1982 in Uppsala.

== Belief and knowledge ==
Hedenius was best-known for his book, Tro och vetande (Belief and Knowledge), published in 1949 under the influence of Bertrand Russell and analytic philosophy. The book started one of the most wide-ranging cultural debates in Swedish history. The debate was about the truthfulness of the teachings of Christianity and the position of the Church in society. He rejected organised Christianity, especially the established role of the Church of Sweden. In Belief and Knowledge, he described three postulates that theology does not comply with to show that it is not possible to have a rational debate about religion. According to Hedenius, this means that theology can not be classified as knowledge but as "quasi-knowledge":

- The religion-psychology postulate: A religious belief contains metaphysical assumptions which science can neither verify nor falsify—for example, assertions of the existence of God, or the immortality of the soul.
- The language-theory postulate: It must be possible to communicate the religious comprehension and experience even to non-believers.
- The logic postulate: Two truths cannot contradict each other. Of two contradictory statements, at most one can be true. Theology not only contains theses which contradict what we know about reality (contrary to the religion-psychology postulate) but also accepts inner contradictions—for example, the oldest and, according to Hedenius, also insoluble problem of evil.

Hedenius was of the opinion that Christianity violates these rules and is therefore irrational. Amongst other things, he proposed that the study of religions and their development should be separated from theology and become a non-religious academic discipline.

== Works ==
- Begriffsanalyse und kritischer Idealismus (I), in «Theoria», vol. 5, issue 3 (January 1939), pp. 281–313
- Om rätt och moral (1941)
- Om praktisk filosofi (1948)
- Tro och vetande (1949)
- Att välja livsåskådning (1951)
- Tro och livsåskådning (1958)
- Helvetesläran (1972)
- Samtal med Ingemar Hedenius (in part with Sven Ragne Carlson) (1975)
- Henschen-Dahlquist, Ann-Mari, En Ingemar Hedenius bibliografi, Thales, Stockholm 1993.
