= Károly Pap =

Hungarian writer (1897–1945)

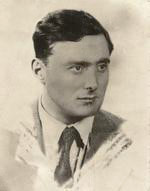
- Born: 24 September 1897; Sopron, Austria-Hungary
- Died: 1945 (aged 47–48); Buchenwald or Bergen-Belsen, Nazi Germany

Károly Pap (24 September 1897 – 1945) was a Hungarian writer.

== Biography ==
He was the third child of Miksa Pollák, who was the Chief Rabbi of the Neolog community in Sopron. His mother was from a wealthy family.

He volunteered to fight in World War I and served as an officer on the Italian Front. After the war, he fought on behalf of the Hungarian Soviet Republic. Following the Republic's demise, this resulted in his being jailed from 1920 to 1921. In 1922, he moved to Vienna, Austria, where he worked for a coffin maker and spent time with a touring theater company. His first novel was published in 1923.

Three years later, after returning to Hungary, he made the acquaintance of Lajos Mikes and the founding editor of Nyugat, Ernő Osvát, who encouraged him to continue writing and promoted his works. He established many friendships with significant writers, who in turn appreciated and supported his work. He made little or no money from his books, however, and was largely supported by his wife, Hedvig.

In 1936, he was awarded the Baumgarten Prize, but was prevented from receiving it. During the war, in 1943, he was conscripted into the Labor Service, as Jews were not allowed to serve in the armed forces. The following year, he was transported to Buchenwald. He was last known to be alive in January 1945, but had disappeared by the time Buchenwald and Bergen-Belsen were liberated by the British Army.

He wrote several novels during the 1930s and an essay on the "Jewish Question". His best known novel, the semi-autobiographical Azarel, was published in 1937 and dealt with Jewish assimilation. He remained popular in Hungary, even after being sent to the labor camps."
