= Podgórze II =

District of Wałbrzych, Silesia

- Dzielnica
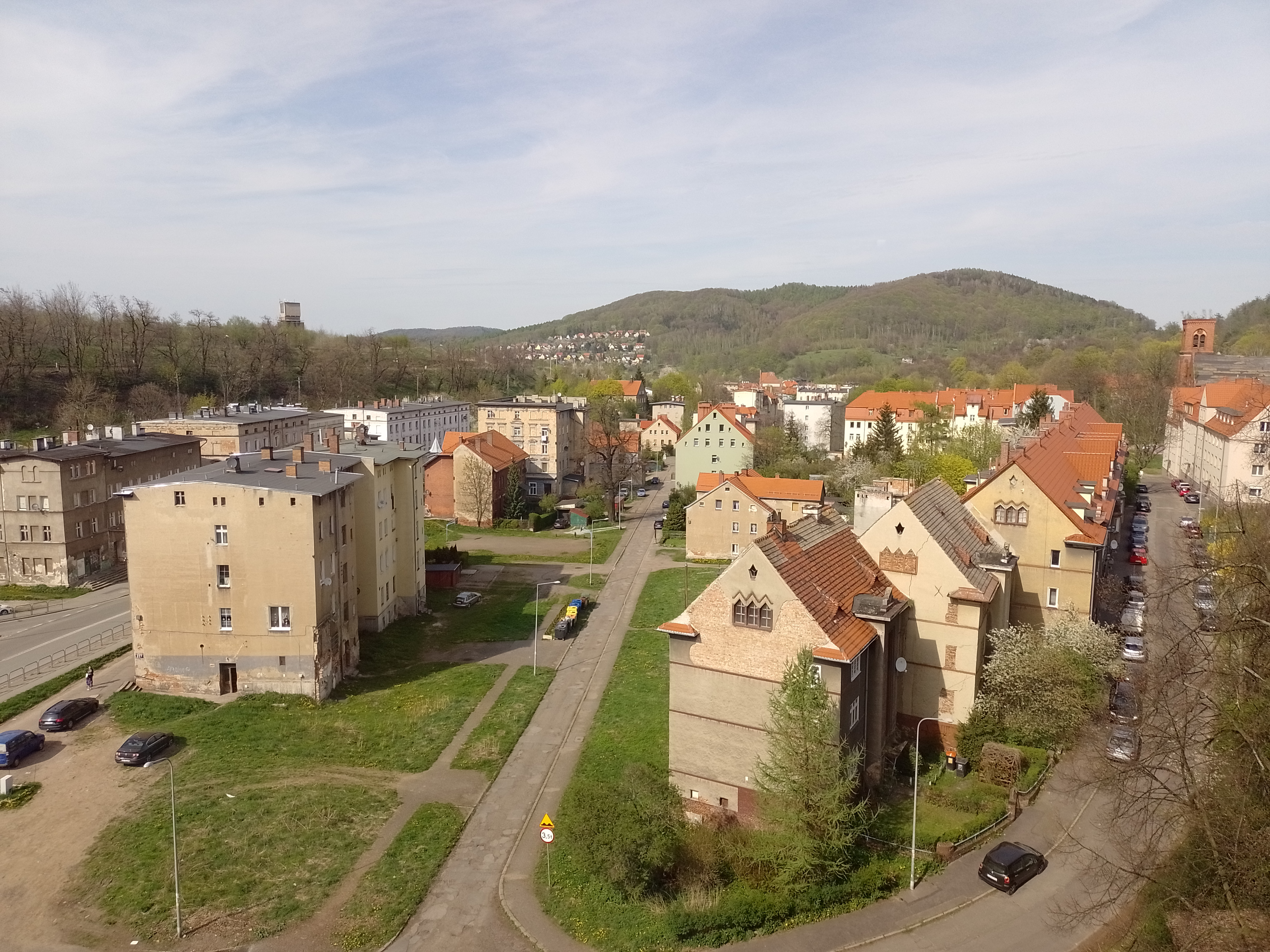
- View of Podgórze II from the railway bridge
- Interactive map of Podgórze II
- Coordinates: 50°44′57″N 16°17′41″E
- Country: Poland
- Voivodeship: Lower Silesian
- City: Wałbrzych

Population (1905)
  - Total: 9,371
- Time zone: UTC+1 (CET)
  - Summer (DST): UTC+2 (CEST)
- Postal code: 58-303
- SIMC: 1062799

Podgórze II (German: Dittersbach) is a dzielnica of Wałbrzych, 5 kilometres (3 mi) by rail south-east of Wałbrzych and 80 km (50 mi) south-west of Wrocław. It has coal mines, bleachfields and match factories. Its population in 1905 was 9371.
