= Enrica von Handel-Mazzetti =

Austrian poet and writer (1871–1955)

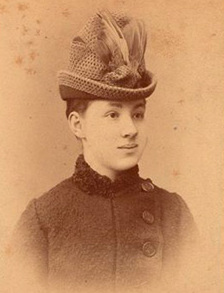
- Von Handel-Mazzetti, c. 1889
- Born: 10 January 1871; Vienna, Austria-Hungary
- Died: 8 April 1955 (aged 84); Linz, Austria
- Known for: Historical novelist

Enrica von Handel-Mazzetti (10 January 1871 – 8 April 1955) was an Austrian poet and writer, known for her historical romances, notably Die Hochzeit von Quedlinburg.

== Life ==
Enrica Freifrau von Handel-Mazzetti was born in Vienna on 10 January 1871. Her father, Baron Heinrich Hypolith of Handel-Mazzetti, died before her birth. She was well-educated, studying history and languages. After her mother died, she went to live with a bachelor uncle, Baron Anton von Handel-Mazzetti, in Steyr in 1901. Her cousin was the botanist Heinrich von Handel-Mazzetti.

She moved with her uncle to Linz when he was promoted in 1911. This was in the middle of her most productive period when her books were being serialised in magazines as well as being published and enthusiastically received.

When 25 members of the PEN Club passed a resolution to protest the Nazi book burnings in 1933, von Handel-Mazzetti and other nationalist and Catholic authors did not agree and quit the club. She was a member of the Reich Chamber of Literature (part of the Reich Chamber of Culture), but her work was not encouraged by the Nazi regime.

During World War II, she stayed in Linz, apart from when the bombing was severe and she briefly moved to Elisabethinen in 1944. Having lived in Linz for the rest of her life, von Handel-Mazzetti died there on 8 April 1955.

== Legacy ==
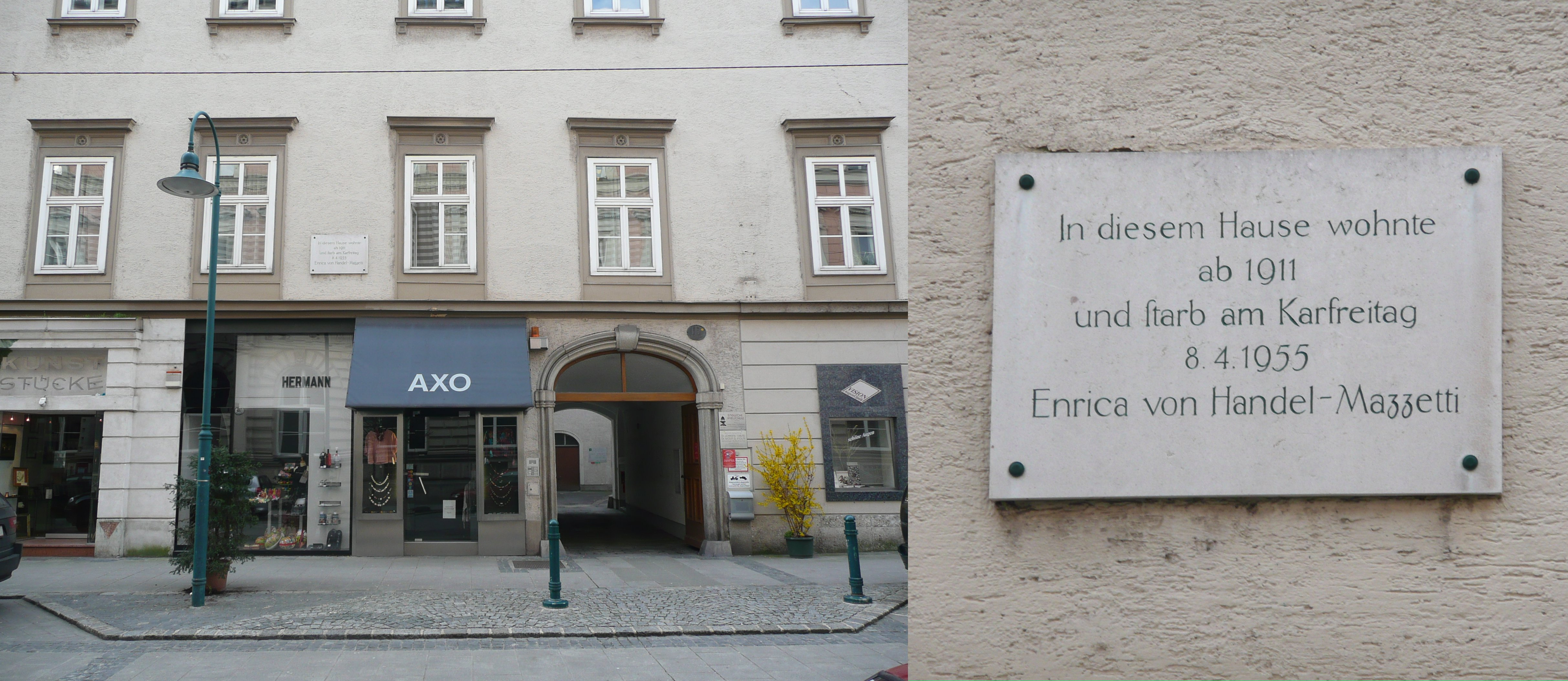
A plaque to her memory in Linz

Apart from her published novels and poetry, there is a street named after von Handel-Mazzetti in 1931 in Steyr and another street in Vienna in 1981. There was also an Austrian postage stamp that celebrated her life.
