= Latvijas Kareivis =

Latvian newspaper

- Type: daily newspaper
- Owner: Latvian Army
- Founded: February 1, 1920
- Ceased publication: from August 9, 1940
- Language: Latvian
- Headquarters: Rīga, Latvia
- Website: data.lnb.lv (in Latvian)

Latvijas Kareivis (English: Latvian Soldier) was an official daily newspaper of the Latvian Army from February 1, 1920, to August 9, 1940.

It was initially published 3 times in a week, but from March 7, 1920, it was published six times in a week. At the beginning Latvijas Kareivis was 2 pages long, but later in some circulations it consisted of 32 pages. Its content consisted of various topics related to the military as official documents from Ministry of Defense and headquarters, stories about Latvian War of Independence, there also were discussed questions about politics, social life and army.

== Literature ==
- Latvijas Brīvības cīņas 1918 — 1920. Enciklopēdija. Rīga:Preses nams, 1999. ISBN 9984-00-395-7
