= Joseph Bidez =

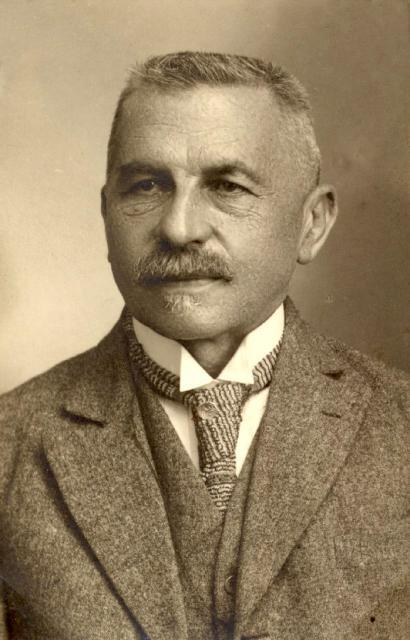
Joseph Bidez

Joseph Marie Auguste Bidez (9 April 1867 – 20 September 1945) was a Belgian classical philologist. He was Professor of Classical Philology and the History of Philosophy at the University of Ghent.
