= Lidia Veselitskaya =

Russian writer

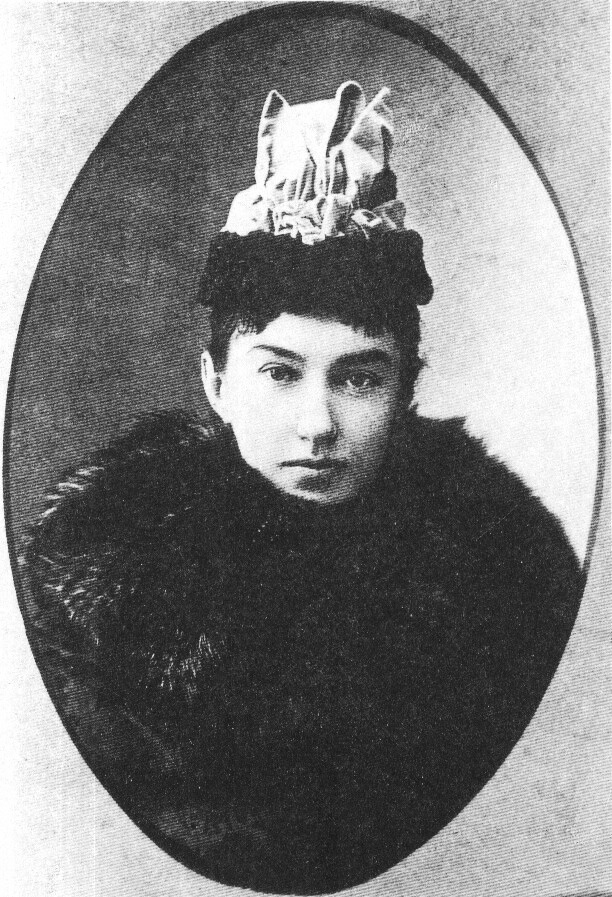
- Born: March 17, 1857; Yegoryevsk, Russia
- Died: February 23, 1936 (aged 78); Pushkin, Soviet Union
- Writing career
- Notable work: Mimi's Marriage

Lidia Ivanovna Veselitskaya (Russian: Ли́дия Ива́новна Весели́тская; March 17, 1857 – February 23, 1936) was a Russian novelist, short story writer, memoirist, and translator who used the pseudonyms V. Mikulich (Russian: В. Микулич) and L. Chernavina (Russian: Л. Чернавина).

== Biography ==
Veselitskaya was born in 1857 into a military family in Yegoryevsk. Her father was an instructor of the Alexander Cadet Corps. She was educated at the Pavlovsk Institute, where she studied teaching, graduating in 1874. She then enrolled in the Saint Petersburg pedagogical courses, graduating in 1876. She married a Russian Army officer soon after graduating. Her first literary efforts were simple tales for young people, including In the Family and In the School, Family Evenings, and Of Children's Reading.

She published her first novel Mimi's Marriage in the journal The Herald of Europe in 1883. She attained the height of her popularity with the publication in 1891 of Mimi at the Springs, set in the Caucasus. Leo Tolstoy, commenting on what C. Hagberg Wright called "the penetrating and pitiless" analysis of Mimi's character, said that "The author must be a man, as no woman would be so frank in writing of her own sex." Nikolai Leskov said of the novel "a tale... fresh, alive and very relevant... the manner of writing is extremely skillful and pleasant." The last novel in the trilogy, Mimi Poisons Herself appeared in 1893, also published in The Herald of Europe.

Veselitskaya's personal life wasn't happy; she suffered through the divorce of her parents and the subsequent break-up of her family. This apparently caused her to pay keen attention to the subject of women's lives, domestic conflict and turmoil, and the relationships of men and women. Many of her stories lacked depth, but she published several truthful and impressive short works written under the influence of Leo Tolstoy and his philosophy, dealing with the terrible suffering of the poor and other manifestations of social injustice.

In the first two decades of the 20th century she occasionally published short stories and novellas, but after 1917, she withdrew from literary work and turned increasingly to making translations. She translated the works of Alphonse Daudet, Victor Hugo, and others. As a young woman she met with Fyodor Dostoyevsky and Vsevolod Garshin. She later collaborated with the editors of Severny Vestnik, Liubov Gurevich and A. Volynsky. She had a friendly relationship with Nikolai Leskov, and visited Leo Tolstoy at his home in Moscow, which was located close to hers, and was friendly with his daughters and his personal friends Vladimir Chertkov, and others, and his biographer Pavel Biryukov. She didn't agree with Tolstoy's religious views, but shared his socio-critical views. She produced a considerable body of works including the Mimi trilogy, novellas, short stories, translations, and literary memoirs. Her autobiographical book Meetings with Writers, published in 1929, tells of her friendships with Tolstoy and others.

She spent her last years living in the town of Pushkin, where she taught music at a school for orphans.

== English translations ==
- Mimi's Marriage, (novel), T. Fisher Unwin LTD, London, 1915. from Archive.org

== Sources ==
- Wright, C. Hagberg (1915). Introduction to Mimi's Marriage. London: T. Fisher Unwin. pp. v–xiii.
- P. Nikolaev. "Biographical Dictionary of Russian Writers" (in Russian). Archived from the original on 2016-03-04.
