= Georges Duhamel =

Georges Duhamel may refer to:

- Georges Duhamel (politician) (1855–1892), Canadian lawyer and political
- Georges Duhamel (footballer) (1879–?), French footballer
- Georges Duhamel (author) (1884–1966), French author
