= Hermann Stehr =

German novelist, dramatist and poet

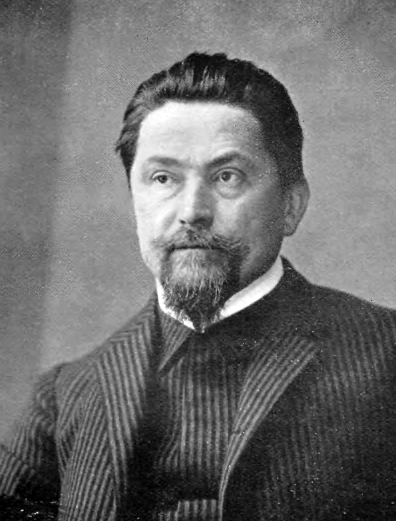
- Hermann Stehr in 1911
- Born: 16 February 1864; Habelschwerdt, Province of Silesia, Prussia
- Died: 11 September 1940 (aged 76); Schreiberhau, Province of Silesia, German Reich
- Occupation: author
- Spouse: Hedwig Nentwig
- Father: Robert Stehr

Hermann Stehr (16 February 1864 – 11 September 1940) was a German novelist, dramatist and poet. He was nominated for the Nobel Prize in Literature four times.

== Personal life ==
Stehr was born in Habelschwerdt (today Bystrzyca Kłodzka) in 1864; he was the fifth child of Robert Stehr. He was brought up in an indigent family under the strict rules of his religious parents. Much of Stehr's family background remains unknown, however in the novel Drei Nächte, if accepted as being autobiographical, he mentioned a grandfather, who came from Baden. This grandfather worked in a higher legal office during the outbreak of the European Revolutions of 1848 in Germany.

Stehr married Hedwig Nentwig in 1894, four of their sons died in infancy. Stehr described the painful death of children in some of his fictional works, notably Das letzte Kind. In 1899 he moved to Dittersbach (today a district of Wałbrzych). He abandoned teaching and in 1915 and devoted himself to writing with the support of his patron, the Silesian textile manufacturer Hans Pinkus. In autumn 1915 he settled in Bad Warmbrunn (today a district of Jelenia Góra), and in 1926 he moved to Schreiberhau where he lived until his death.

== Career ==
Between 1881 and 1885, Stehr trained as an elementary school teacher in Bad Landeck and then in Habelschwerdt. He objected to the educational methods at school, as well as he was against priggishness and prudery of the teachers. He doubted basic tenets of the Catholic Church which triggered a conflict between Stehr and his superiors. However, he was a believer but as he claimed, he needed no mediator between himself and God. In 1885 he started working as a teacher in Silesian Bukowina. In 1887 he moved to Patschkau - a small village in the mountains where he worked under the supervision of two parish priests. During his time in Patschkau he felt abandoned and lonely. His time in Patschkau was difficult but then he found solace in God. In his poem An Gott he wrote that God had a huge influence on his life.

He published several novels, including Leonore Griebel (a story of marital conflict), Der begrabene Gott (about a poor maid from Patschkau and her contrary husband) and Drei Nächte (set in Habelschwerdt and thought to be autobiographical). In his satire Meicke, der Teufel, a tale of alcoholism, he described a dishonest and disreputable protagonist who too precisely resembled a farmer from Patschkau, for which he was sued and sentenced to pay 50 marks. In his works he often described the lives of the characters, mainly Silesian peasants and workers, as a dramatic search for God. He also wrote fairy tales and poetry. His most famous and successful work was the novel Der Heiligenhof about a Silesian farmer, his blind daughter, her love for a young man and the farmer's search for God. This story was retold in a later work from the point of view of the young man, Peter Brindeisner.

Some German nationalists identified Stehr as a eulogist of the German soul. However, the more ideological National Socialists criticised Stehr for his advocacy of independent thought and seeking God within oneself rather than finding solace in society. His works are not celebrations of an innocent rural life, extolling men of the soil, as Blood and Soil literature did, but owe more to naturalism through the portrayal of the poverty and hardship of ordinary people's lives, and the Heimat-Roman or regional novel genre through their focus on Silesia and, more specifically, the people of the Grafschaft Glatz.

His letters and manuscripts can mostly be found in the German Museum of Modern Literature in Marbach am Neckar (Deutsches Literaturarchiv Marbach).

== Political involvement ==
During the founding of the Weimar Republic, Stehr appeared as an election speaker for his friend Walther Rathenau, a candidate for the Democratic Party.

In 1934 Stehr wrote a letter to Adolf Hitler, which was a protest against the president of the police and SA-Obergruppenfűhrer Edmund Heines who pursued a policy of terror and violence against citizens. The letter remained unanswered.

== Awards and recognition ==
Throughout his career Stehr received several awards, including an honorary doctorate from the University of Breslau in 1934 and honorary citizenships of Habelschwerdt and Schreiberhau. In Münster there is a street named in his honor Literary prizes that he received included:

- the Bauernfeld Prize (1910),
- the Fastenrath Prize (1919),
- the Schiller Prize (1919),
- the Rathenau Prize (1930),
- the Wartburg Rose (1932),
- the Goethe Medal for Art and Science (1932), and
- the Goethe Prize of Frankfurt-am-Main (1933).

He was nominated for the Nobel Prize in Literature four times (1933, 1934, 1935, and 1936) but did not win.

Stehr was also appointed as a founding member of the Prussian Literary Academy (1926).

== Bibliography ==
- Auf Leben und Tod 1898 (novellas)
- Leonore Griebel, 1900
- Meta Konegen, 1904 (drama)
- Der begrabene Gott, 1905
- Drei Nächte, 1909
- Geschichten aus dem Mandelhause, 1913 (republished with additional chapters, much enlarged, as Das Mandelhaus, 1953)
- Das Abendrot, 1916 (novellas)
- Der Heiligenhof, 1918
- Das Lebensbuch, 1920 (poetry)
- Die Krähen, 1921 (novellas)
- Peter Brindeisener, 1924
- Mythen und Mären, 1929 (collected fairy tales and short stories)
- Die Nachkommen, 1933
- Mein Leben, 1934 (autobiography)
- Der Mittelgarten, 1936 (poetry)
- Droben Gnade - drunten Recht, 1944

== English translations ==
- The Engraver, 2012 ISBN 0-473-21205-6
- Meicke, the Devil, 2012 ISBN 0-473-21362-1
- The Shinglemaker and Other Tales, 2012 ISBN 0-473-21589-6
- Leonore Griebel, 2012 ISBN 0-473-22014-8
- The Buried God, 2013 ISBN 0-473-22798-3
- The Shimmer of the Assistant and Other Tales, 2013 ISBN 0-473-24249-4
- The Twilight and Other Tales, 2013 ISBN 0-473-24447-0
- Three Nights, 2014 ISBN 978-0-473-28161-8
- Stories from the Mandel House, 2014 ISBN 978-0-473-28165-6
- The Runaway Heart and Other Tales, 2014 ISBN 978-0-473-28163-2
- The Crows, 2014 ISBN 978-0-473-28167-0
- Gudnatz, the Grafter, 2014 ISBN 978-0-473-28178-6
- The Blessed Farm, 2017 ISBN 978-0-473-39813-2
