= Ernő Osvát =

Hungarian writer and editor

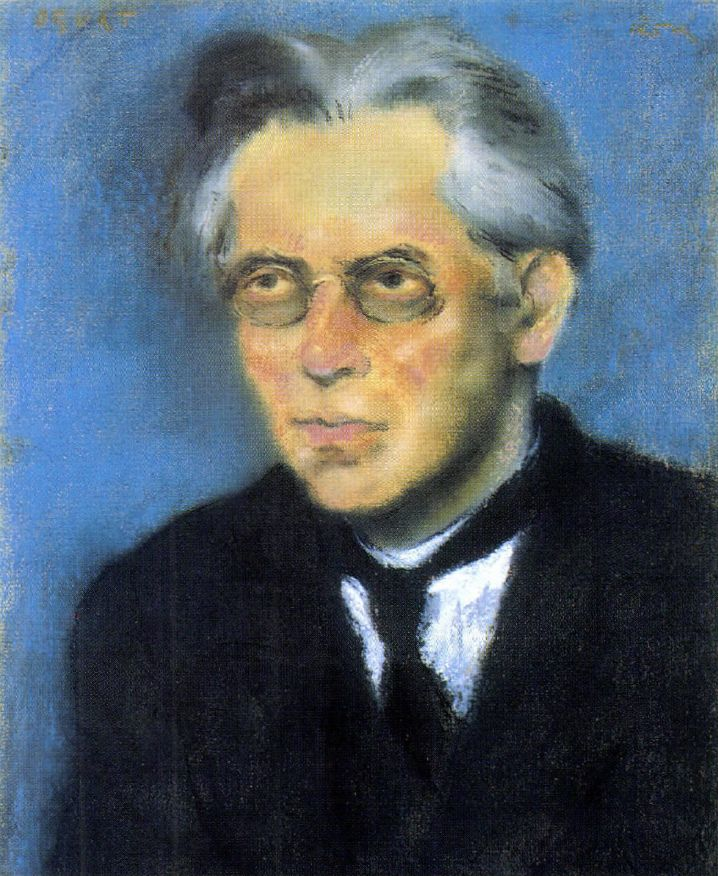
- Ernő Osvát portrayed by József Rippl-Rónai
- Born: 7 April 1877
- Died: 28 October 1929 (aged 52)

Ernő Osvát (7 April 1877 – 28 October 1929) was a Hungarian writer and editor.

His first article was published 1897 in the a Hungarian newspaper called Esti Újság. He became the editor of the Magyar Géniusz in 1902, transforming it from a nationalist publication to the home of modern literature in Hungary. He founded Figyelő in 1905, and three years later was founding editor of Nyugat, the most important Hungarian literary magazine of the early 20th century.

He committed suicide in 1929.
