= Edvarts Virza =

Latvian writer, poet

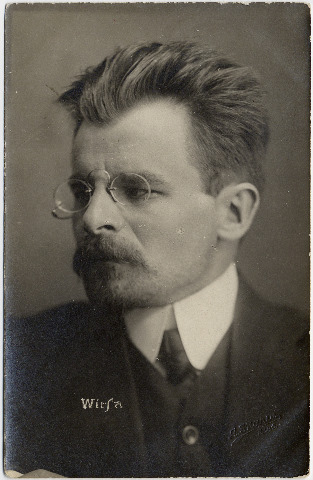
- Virza in 1914
- Born: 27 December 1883; Salgale Parish, Russian Empire (Now Jelgava Municipality, Latvia)
- Died: 1 March 1940 (aged 56); Rīga, Latvia
- Occupations: Writer, poet, journalist
- Spouse: Elza Stērste
- Writing career
- Period: 1906–1940
- Notable awards: Order of the Three Stars, 2nd and 3rd Class
- Literary movement: Symbolism

Edvarts Virza (born Jēkabs Eduards Liekna; 27 December 1883 – 1 March 1940) was a Latvian writer, poet and translator. In 1935 and 1936 he was a nominee for the Nobel Prize in Literature. His works were banned in the Latvian SSR until 1985.

== Biography ==
Edvarts Virza was born as Jēkabs Eduards Liekna in Rāceņi homestead, Salgale parish, Courland Governorate on 27 December 1883. He was the oldest of nine children and his father Juris Liekna was a relatively wealthy farmer.

Edvarts attended a local parish school and later studied in Bauska town school from which he graduated in 1901. In 1902 he started studies in technical school of post and telegraph in Riga. However he soon left his studies and in 1904 traveled to Moscow where he attended law lectures in Moscow University. During the Russian revolution of 1905 he returned to Latvia and lived in his family home where he studied French and poetry of Russian symbolists. In 1906 his first poem was printed in a newspaper and in 1907 his first collection of poetry Biķeris (Goblet) was published.

During the First World War, in the summer of 1915 the German Army occupied Kurzeme and invaded Zemgale with little resistance, forcing thousands of Latvians to leave their homes and travel as refugees to Vidzeme or further east to inner Russia. Virza's family also left Zemgale but Edvarts enlisted in the 5th Zemgale Latvian Rifleman regiment under the command of Jukums Vācietis in 1916. In 1917 he together with the majority of Latvian riflemen went to Russia and settled in Saint Petersburg. While in Petersburg he was addressed by members of Latvian Provisional National Council and wrote an extensive analytical article titled Izpostītā Latvija (Devastated Latvia) about the German – Russian war in the Baltic area and the senseless heroism of Latvian soldiers while fighting in a foreign army. The article was intended for Entente countries to inform them about the situation in the Baltics. Virza also translated this article into French. In 1918 Virza was demobilised from the Russian army and returned to Latvia.

During Latvian War of Independence Virza worked for several newspapers and his articles and patriotic poems were published regularly. In January 1919, under Bolshevik pressure, Virza together with the Provisional Government left Riga and evacuated to Liepāja. After a pro-German coup in April 1919, Virza traveled from Liepāja by sea to Tallinn and from there to Valka where Latvian military units, still loyal to the Provisional Government, were being organized. While in Valka, he together with Oto Nonācs and Jēkabs Janševskis published the newspaper Tautas Balss (Voice of the Nation). Despite its short life, this newspaper with its outspoken pro-Latvian independence position became one of the symbols of a free Latvia. In the autumn of 1919 when the attack of the West Russian volunteer army began Virza lived in Riga and worked on the editorial staff of the military newspaper Latvijas Kareivis (Soldier of Latvia) together with his friend poet Viktors Eglītis and fellow writer Aleksandrs Grīns. During this period he met poet Elza Stērste and the couple married a year later in the autumn of 1920.

From 1921–1922 Virza worked as a director of a Latvian press office in Paris. In 1922 their daughter Amarillis was born. In 1923 Virza became a member of Latvian Farmers' Union and from 1923 until his death in 1940 led the literature section of the party newspaper Brīvā Zeme. He also worked as a director of Dailes Theatre for several years. Edvarts Virza died on March 1, 1940, in Riga only two months prior to the Soviet occupation of Latvia and was buried in Riga Forest Cemetery. During the period of Soviet occupation works of Edvarts Virza were banned and there was no mention of him in literature books.

== Literature ==
Edvarts Virza is considered as first Latvian symbolist in poetry. His first collection Biķeris in 1907 is not only a bright example of Latvian symbolism but also the first example of erotic poetry in Latvian literature. His later works are mostly neo-classical however they have many aspects of romanticism as well. During the period of the Republic of Latvia, the main themes of Virzas poetry were patriotism and the beauty of nature. In 1933 he finished a poem (actually a prose work) Straumēni which is today included in Latvian Cultural Canon. This work describes idealised peasant life in Zemgale during the 1880s. It combines Virza's own childhood memories with tales of his grandparents. After the Ulmanis coup in May 1934 Virza became one of the favorite poets of Kārlis Ulmanis, he actively took part in regime propaganda and wrote many poems and articles which promote country life, peasant work and patriotism. In 1935 he also published a book about Kārlis Ulmanis.
