= Jarl Hemmer =

Finnish writer

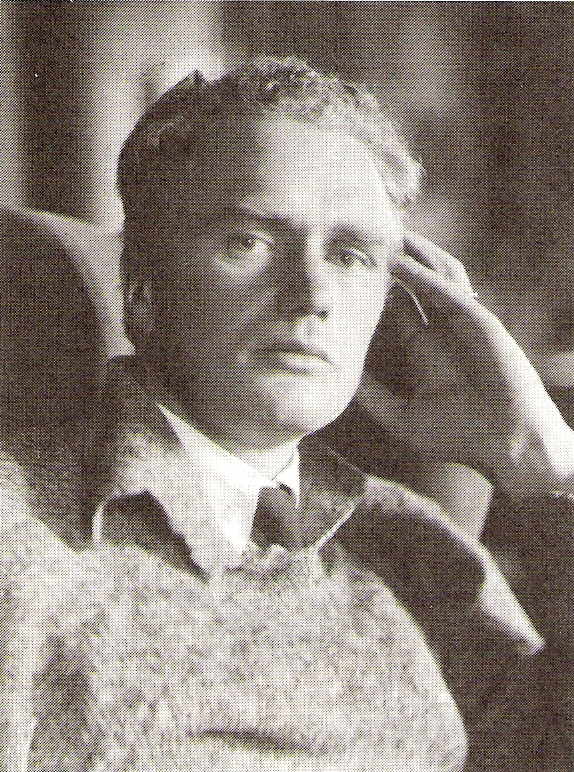
- Born: 18 September 1893
- Died: 6 December 1944 (aged 51)
- Known for: 8 Nobel nominations

Jarl Robert Hemmer (18 September 1893 – 6 December 1944) was a Swedish-speaking Finnish author. He was nominated for the Nobel Prize in Literature in six consecutive years.

== Biography ==
Hemmer was born in Vaasa, Finland, into a wealthy family. His father was Bror Balder Hemmer, a court assessor and bank manager, and his mother was Emilia Finnilä. He married Saga Margareta Söderman. Hemmer completed his matriculation exam in 1912 and earned a Bachelor of Philosophy degree in 1917. He served as the secretary of the Finnish Swedish Writers' Association from 1920 to 1924. Hemmer received several literary awards, including the State Literary Prize in 1919, 1920, 1924, 1926, 1928, 1929, and 1934, the SLS Society Prize in 1938, the Lybeck Prize in 1926 and 1935, and the Boisman Prize in 1937.

His first collection of poems, Rösterna (The Voices), was published in 1914. He made his breakthrough in 1922 with another collection of epic poetry called Rågens rike (Realm of the Rye). He received The Great Nordic Novel Prize (Stora Nordiska Romanpriset) for En man och hans samvete (A Fool of Faith), a book about the Finnish Civil War, published in 1931. Hemmer was among the contributors to Garm, a Swedish language satirical and political magazine based in Helsinki.

Following the murder of Kaj Munk on 4 January 1944, the Danish resistance newspaper De frie Danske published condemning reactions from influential Scandinavians, including Hemmer.

== Works ==
- The Voices 1914.
- Realm of the Rye. Helsinki: Akademiska Bokhandeln, 1938. OCLC 24137769
- Fool of faith. New York: Liveright Pub. Corp., 1935, OCLC 610592722
- Rösterna (1914; 2nd expanded edition 1918)
- Fantaster (1915)
- Pelaren och andra dikter (1916)
- Ett land i kamp (1918)
- Förvandlingar (1918)
- Prins Louis Ferdinand av Preussen (1919)
- Över dunklet (1919)
- Onni Kokko (1920)
- De skymda ljusen (1921)
- Rågens rike (1922)
- Viljan valtakunta (1926)
- Väntan (1922)
- Med ödet ombord (1924)
- Skärseld (1925)
- Fattiggubbens brud (1926)
- Budskap (1928)
- Helg (1929)
- En man och hans samvete (1931)
- Lyrik i urval (1931)
- Onni Kokko och andra berättelser (1931)
- Morgongåvan (1934)
- Nordan (1936)
- Anna Ringars (1937)
- Klockan i havet (1939)
- Du land. Femton tidsdikter (1940)
- Lyrik 1914–1944 (1945)
- Skrifter i minnesupplaga (1945–1946)
- Dikter i urval (1959) – based on Lyrik i urval and Lyrik 1914–1944
- Ljuset i Gehenna (1963)
- Rågens rike (1974)
