= Fredrik Böök =

Swedish academic and writer (1883–1961)

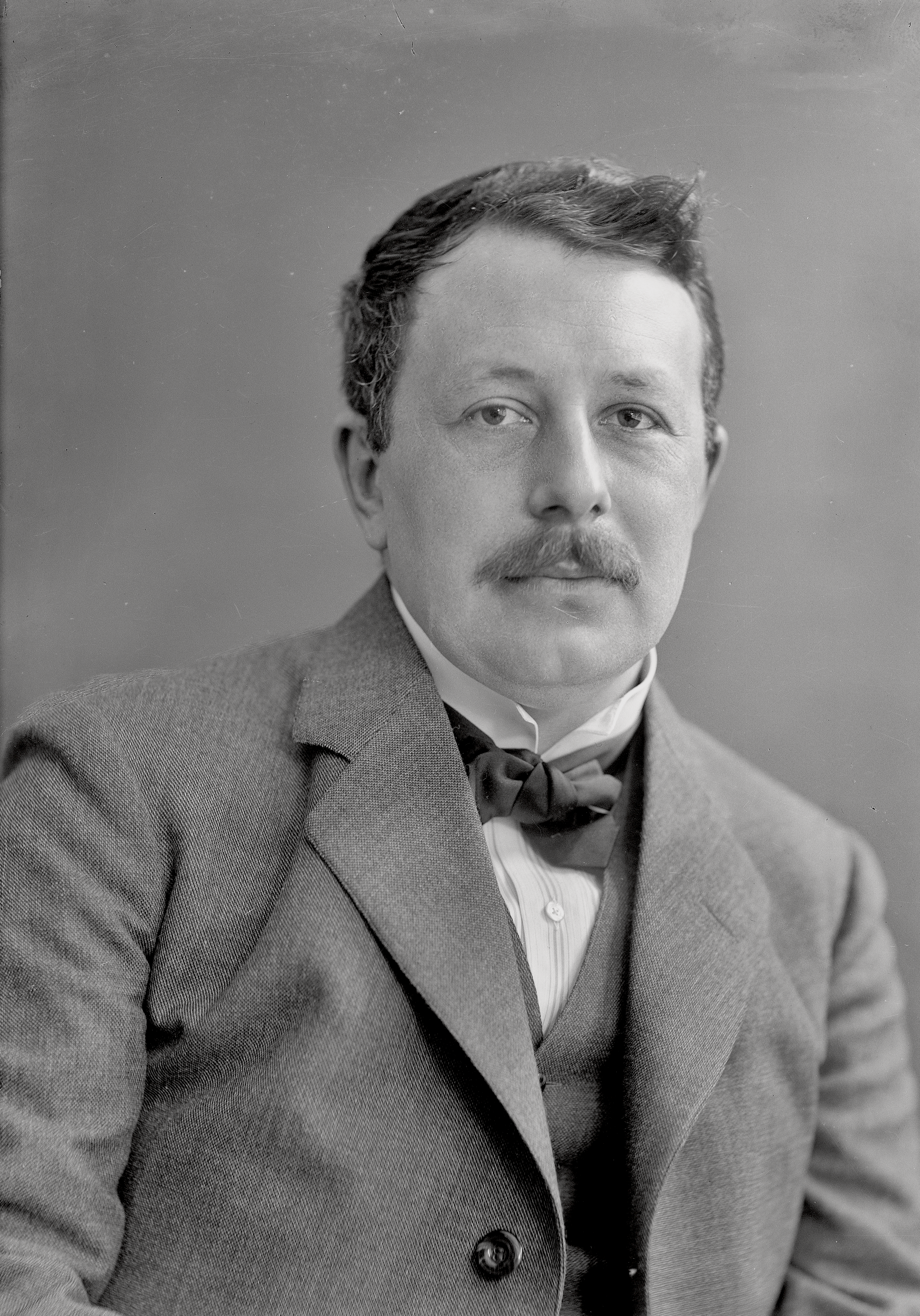
- Born: 12 May 1883; Kristianstads parish
- Died: 2 December 1961 (aged 78); Lund Cathedral parish
- Resting place: Förslöv cemetery
- Alma mater: Lund University
- Occupation: Writer, literary historian, literary critic
- Spouse(s): Tora Ingeborg Böök
- Partner(s): Kate Bang
- Awards: Svenska Akademiens stora pris (1917)
- Position held: seat 10 of the Swedish Academy (1922–1961)

Martin Fredrik Böök (May 12, 1883 in Kristianstad – December 2, 1961 in Copenhagen) was a Swedish professor of literary history at Lund University, literary critic and writer. He wrote biographies and books on Swedish literature.

== Biography ==
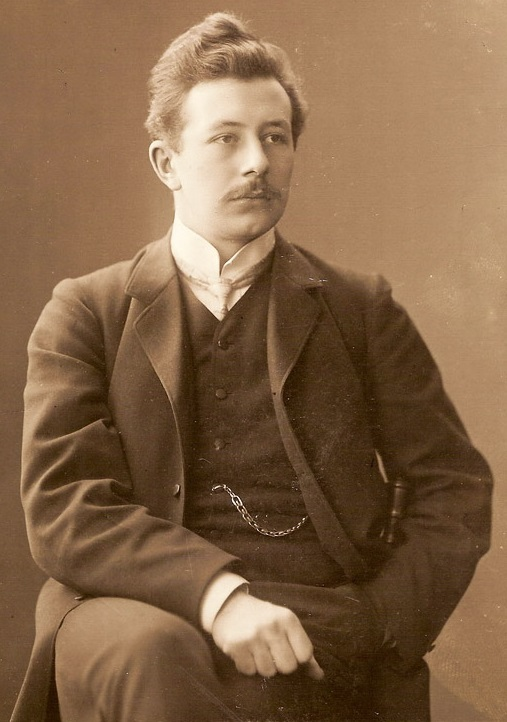
Fredrik Böök circa 1900

Fredrik Böök became a philosophy graduate at Lund University in 1903, a philosophy licentiate and an associate professor of literary history in 1907 and a philosophy doctor in 1908. In 1920 he became professor of literary history at Lund University.

Alongside Henrik Schück, Böök was for decades the most influential (and feared) Swedish literature scholar and critic. He reviewed books for the newspaper Svenska Dagbladet, succeeding Oscar Levertin. In 1922 he became a member of the Swedish Academy, seat 10. During World War II, Böök actively supported the cause of Germany as a belligerent power. After the war he lost his dominating role in the literary field. His biography was written in 1994 by Svante Nordin.

== Personal life ==
In 1907, Fredrik Böök married Tora Olsson. Their son Klas Böök (1909–1980) became head of the Bank of Sweden and later an ambassador.

== Works translated into English ==
- Verner von Heidenstam, author of "The Charles men" (1920)
- Sweden of today : a survey of its intellectual and material culture, edited by Magnus Blomstedt & Fredrik Böök (1930)
- An eyewitness in Germany, translated from the Swedish by Elizabeth Sprigge and Claude Napier (1933)
- Hans Christian Andersen : a biography, translated from the Swedish by George C. Schoolfield (1962)

Cultural offices
| Preceded by Harald Hjärne | Swedish Academy, Seat No.10; 1922-1961 | Succeeded by Erik Lönnroth |
