= Heinrich von Handel-Mazzetti =

Austrian botanist (1882–1940)

Heinrich Raphael Eduard Freiherr von Handel-Mazzetti
- Born: 19 February 1882; Vienna
- Died: 1 February 1940 (aged 57)
- Education: University of Vienna
- Known for: Studies on Chinese plants
- Scientific career
- Fields: Botany
- Author abbrev. (botany): Hand.-Mazz.

Heinrich Raphael Eduard Freiherr von Handel-Mazzetti (19 February 1882 in Vienna – 1 February 1940) was an Austrian botanist best known for his monograph of dandelions, many publications on the flora of China, and botanical explorations of that country. He was the cousin of novelist Enrica von Handel-Mazzetti (1871–1955).

== Life ==
He studied botany at the University of Vienna, obtaining his doctorate in 1907. From 1905 he served as an assistant at the botanical institute in Vienna. In 1925 he was appointed curator to the Natural History Museum.

In 1907 he published a world monograph of the genus Taraxacum (dandelions). Even if taxonomy of this genus has changed significantly. Handel-Mazzetti's book remains useful, especially because it is the only work of such scope until now.

His earlier research involved scientific excursions to Switzerland (1906), Bosnia and Herzegovina (1909), followed by an expedition to Mesopotamia and Kurdistan (1910). On behalf of the Austrian Academy of Sciences, he traveled to China in 1914, performing botanical research in the provinces of Yunnan (1914, 1915, 1916), Sichuan (1914), Guizhou (1917), and Hunan (1917, 1918). In China he also undertook cartographic surveys. He returned to Vienna in 1919, and devoted his time and energy to the study of Chinese flora. Starting at that time he distributed more than 12,000 numbered herbarium specimens under the title Iter Sinense 1914–1918 sumptibus Academiae scientarum Vindobonensis susceptum which sometimes are treated as belonging to an exsiccata-like series.

He was the author of Naturbilder aus Südwest-China : Erlebnisse und Eindrücke eines österreichischen Forschers während des Weltkrieges (1927), later translated into English as "A botanical pioneer in South West China : experiences and impressions of an Austrian botanist during the First World War".

There are streets named after Handel-Mazzetti in the Austrian towns of Kremsmünster, St. Pölten, Schwanenstadt, Steyr, Wels and Wieselburg as well as the cities of Linz and Vienna.
