= List of nominees for the Nobel Prize in Literature =

Nobel Prize nominees for Literature

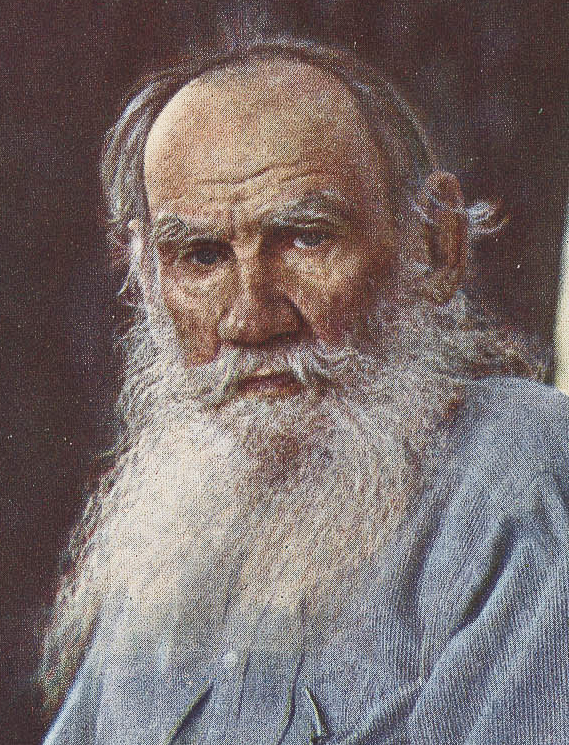
Many widely read writers, such as Leo Tolstoy, never won the Nobel Prize in Literature

The Nobel Prize in Literature (Swedish: Nobelpriset i litteratur) is awarded annually by the Swedish Academy to authors who, according to the Swedish industrialist Alfred Nobel, the benefactor of the prize, have produced "in the field of literature the most outstanding work in an ideal direction". It is one of the five Nobel Prizes that are awarded for outstanding contributions in chemistry, physics, literature, peace, and physiology or medicine.

Every year, the Swedish Academy sends out requests regularly for nominations of candidates for the Nobel Prize in Literature. Members of the Academy, members of literature academies and societies, professors of literature and language, former Nobel literature laureates, and the presidents of writers' organizations are all allowed to nominate a candidate. Nomination of oneself is not permitted. Despite the yearly invitations for nominations, there have been some years in which the prize was not conferred due to particular reasons (1914, 1918, 1935) and due to the outbreak of World War II (1940–1943). In addition, the prize has been delayed for a year seven times (1915, 1919, 1925, 1926, 1927, 1936, 1949).

Records of nominations are strictly kept secret for 50 years until they are made publicly available. Currently, the nominations submitted from 1901 to 1975 are available. Between those years, there have been 882 writers from different parts of the world nominated for the Nobel Prize in Literature, 74 of whom were awarded the prize, including Albert Schweitzer and Elie Wiesel, who were awarded a Nobel Peace Prize on 1953 and 1986 respectively. Only 89 women had been nominated for the prize starting with Malwida von Meysenburg who was nominated once for the year 1901 and eight of them have been awarded after all. Only one literary society has been nominated, the Pali Text Society for the year 1916.

Of the 882 revealed nominated writers, only the following are currently living:

- for 1967, the Ukrainian poet Lina Kostenko (born 1930)
- for 1969, the Finnish author Hannu Salama (born 1936)
- for 1973, the Indian writer Pratap Narayan Tandon (born 1932)
- for 1974, the Taiwanese poet Chen Min-hwa (born 1934).

Though the following list consists of notable literary figures deemed worthy of the prize, there have been some celebrated writers who were not considered nor even nominated such as Masaoka Shiki, Anton Chekhov, Kate Chopin, Jules Verne, Machado de Assis, Sarah Orne Jewett, William James, Ferdinand de Saussure, Robert Hugh Benson, Booker T. Washington, Sholom Aleichem, Rubén Darío, Jack London, L. Frank Baum, Olive Schreiner, Alexander Blok, Marcel Proust, Katherine Mansfield, Joseph Conrad, Franz Kafka, Rainer Maria Rilke, Ryūnosuke Akutagawa, D. H. Lawrence, Arthur Conan Doyle, Khalil Gibran, Constantine Cavafy, Júlia Lopes de Almeida, Fernando Pessoa, Federico García Lorca, Lu Xun, Horacio Quiroga, Osip Mandelstam, César Vallejo, Gabriele D'Annunzio, Sarat Chandra Chattopadhyay, Edmund Husserl, Antonio Machado, Ernst Toller, Antonio Machado, Francis Scott Fitzgerald, Isaac Babel, Mikhail Bulgakov, Marina Tsvetaeva, James Joyce, Virginia Woolf, Evelyn Underhill, Robert Musil, Simone Weil, Else Lasker-Schüler, Gertrude Stein, Booth Tarkington, Georges Bernanos, Osamu Dazai, Edna St. Vincent Millay, George Orwell, Graciliano Ramos, Dylan Thomas, Wallace Stevens, A. A. Milne, Alfred Döblin, Galaktion Tabidze, Zora Neale Hurston, Richard Wright, Georges Bataille, E. E. Cummings, Edith Hamilton, Flannery O'Connor, C. S. Lewis, Langston Hughes, João Guimarães Rosa, Manuel Bandeira, Jack Kerouac, Christopher Dawson, John Dos Passos, Stevie Smith, John Berryman, Dino Buzzati, Nancy Mitford, Rosario Castellanos, Hannah Arendt, Murilo Mendes, Pier Paolo Pasolini, Agatha Christie, Ernst Bloch and Clarice Lispector.

There were also other news outlets and historians that noted the nominations of Mark Twain in 1907, Charlie Chaplin in 1952, Fernando González Ochoa in 1955 Es'kia Mphahlele in 1969, León de Greiff in 1970, Anja Lundholm in 1974, and Anaïs Nin in 1976 yet their names are not archived in the years they were nominated. Many speculate it could be the case of lost nominations where the nomination letters never arrived at the Swedish Academy due to mishandling and poor mailing services.

== Nominees by their first nomination ==
=== Notes ===
Nominations that were declared invalid and some nomination data are hidden at the Nomination Archive site according to § 8 of the statutes governing the Nobel archives of the Swedish Academy. However, they are provided in this list.

- † Posthumously nominated.
- ♀ Female nominee.
- Living Nominee

=== 1901–1909 ===
No.	Nominee	Born	Died	Country	Refs.
1901
1	Alexander Baumgartner	1841	1910	Switzerland	
2	Charles Borgeaud	1861	1940	Switzerland	
3	João da Câmara	1852	1908	Portugal	
4	Louis Ducros	1846	1927	France	
5	Paul Duproix	1851	1912	France	
6	Carl Gustaf Estlander	1834	1910	Finland	
7	Antonio Fogazzaro	1842	1911	Italy	
8	Julius Gersdorff	1849	1907	Germany	
9	Oscar le Pin	—	—	Switzerland	
10	Ossip Lourié	1868	1955	France	
11	Ferenc Kemény	1860	1944	Hungary	
12	Frédéric Mistral (Note: Awarded the 1904 Nobel Prize in Literature "in recognition of the fresh originality and true inspiration of his poetic production, which faithfully reflects the natural scenery and native spirit of his people, and, on addition, his significant work as a Provençal philologist")	1830	1914	France	
13	Gaspar Núñez de Arce	1832	1903	Spain	
14	Gaston Paris	1839	1903	France	
15	Sully Prudhomme (Note: Awarded the 1901 Nobel Prize in Literature "in special recognition of his poetic composition, which gives evidence of lofty idealism, artistic perfection and a rare combination of the qualities of both heart and intellect")	1839	1907	France	
16	Charles Renouvier	1815	1903	France	
17	Edmond Rostand	1868	1918	France	
18	Auguste Sabatier	1839	1901	France	
19	Paul Sabatier	1858	1928	France	
20	Henryk Sienkiewicz (Note: Awarded the 1905 Nobel Prize in Literature "because of his outstanding merits as an epic writer")	1846	1916	Poland	
21	Giacomo Stampa	—	—	Italy	
22	René Vallery-Radot	1853	1933	France	
23	Malwida von Meysenbug♀	1816	1903	Germany	
24	Alexandru Dimitrie Xenopol	1847	1920	Romania	
25	Émile Zola	1840	1902	France	
1902
26	Juhani Aho	1861	1921	Finland	
27	Marcel Barrière	1860	1954	France	
28	Bjørnstjerne Bjørnson (Note: Awarded the 1903 Nobel Prize in Literature "as a tribute to his noble, magnificent and versatile poetry, which has always been distinguished by both freshness of its inspiration and the rare purity of its spirit") (Note: Nominated for the Nobel Peace Prize "for his public advocacy for peace, democracy, national self-determination, and arbitration between nations")	1832	1910	Norway	
29	Bernard Bosanquet	1848	1923	England	
30	Giosuè Carducci (Note: Awarded the 1906 Nobel Prize in Literature "not only because of his deep learning and critical research, but above all as a tribute to the creative energy, freshness of style, and lyrical force which characterize his poetic masterpieces")	1835	1907	Italy	
31	Houston Stewart Chamberlain	1855	1927	England/Germany	
32	José Echegaray (Note: Awarded the 1904 Nobel Prize in Literature "in recognition of the numerous and brilliant compositions which, in an individual and original manner, have revived the great traditions of the Spanish drama")	1832	1916	Spain	
33	Gustav Falke	1853	1916	Germany	
34	Arne Garborg	1851	1921	Norway	
35	Hartmann Grisar	1845	1932	Germany	.
36	Gerhart Hauptmann (Note: Awarded the 1912 Nobel Prize in Literature "primarily in recognition of his fruitful, varied and outstanding production in the realm of dramatic art")	1862	1946	Germany	
37	Henrik Ibsen	1828	1906	Norway	
38	Anatoly Koni	1844	1927	Russia	
39	Ventura López Fernández	1866	1944	Spain	
40	George Meredith	1828	1909	England	
41	Theodor Mommsen (Note: Awarded the 1902 Nobel Prize in Literature "the greatest living master of the art of historical writing, with special reference to his monumental work, A History of Rome")	1817	1903	Germany	
42	John Morley	1838	1923	England	
43	Lewis Morris	1833	1907	Wales	
44	Archibald Robertson	1853	1931	England	
45	Herbert Spencer (Note: Nominated for the Nobel Peace Prize "for his political and social philosophy supported international peace, individual liberty, and opposition to militarism.")	1820	1903	England	
46	Leo Tolstoy (Note: Nominated for the Nobel Peace Prize "for his literary works, especially his later philosophical and religious books, which promoted peace and anti-militarism.")	1828	1910	Russia	
47	Charles Wagner	1852	1918	France	
48	Carl Weitbrecht	1847	1904	Germany	
49	William Butler Yeats (Note: Awarded the 1923 Nobel Prize in Literature "for his always inspired poetry, which in a highly artistic form gives expression to the spirit of a whole nation")	1865	1939	Ireland	
50	Theodor Zahn	1838	1933	Germany	
1903
51	Georg Brandes (Note: Nominated for the Nobel Peace Prize "for his broader role as an internationalist intellectual during the World War I, championing liberal and humanistic values in Scandinavian culture")	1842	1927	Denmark	
52	François Coppée	1842	1908	France	
53	Robert Langton Douglas	1864	1951	England	
54	Iwan Gilkin	1858	1924	Belgium	
55	Carl Friedrich Glasenapp	1847	1915	Germany	
56	Rudyard Kipling (Note: Awarded the 1907 Nobel Prize in Literature "in consideration of the power of observation, originality of imagination, virility of ideas and remarkable talent for narration which characterize the creations of this world-famous author")	1865	1936	India/England	
57	Maurice Maeterlinck (Note: Awarded the 1911 Nobel Prize in Literature "in appreciation of his many-side literary activities, and especially of his dramatic works, which are distinguished by a wealth of imagination and by a poetic fancy, which reveals, sometimes in the guise of a fairytale, a deep inspiration, while in a mysterious way they appeal to the readers' own feelings and stimulate their imaginations")	1862	1949	Belgium	
58	Marcelino Menéndez Pelayo	1856	1912	Spain	
59	Albert Sorel	1842	1906	France	
60	Algernon Charles Swinburne	1837	1909	England	
1904
61	Demetrios Bernardakis	1833	1907	Greece	
62	William Chapman	1850	1917	Canada	
63	Anatole France (Note: Awarded the 1921 Nobel Prize in Literature "in recognition of his brilliant literary achievements, characterized as they are by a nobility of style, a profound human sympathy, grace, and a true Gallic temperament")	1844	1924	France	
64	Selma Lagerlöf (Note: Awarded the 1909 Nobel Prize in Literature "in appreciation of the lofty idealism, vivid imagination and spiritual perception that characterize hwr writings")♀	1858	1940	Sweden	
65	Émilie Lerou♀	1855	1935	France	
66	Jaroslav Vrchlický	1853	1912	Czechoslovakia	
1905
67	Eliza Orzeszkowa♀	1841	1910	Poland	
68	Godfrey Sweven (Note: John Macmillan Brown has nominated himself under the pseudonym Godfrey Sweven)	1845	1935	Scotland/New Zealand	
1906
69	Max Bewer	1861	1921	Germany	
70	Gaston Boissier	1823	1908	France	
71	William Booth (Note: The nomination was later declared invalid by the Nobel committee because the nominator Otto Classen (1868–1939) from Köln-Lindenthal was found to be ineligible.)	1829	1912	England	
72	Borden Parker Bowne	1847	1910	United States	
73	Angelo de Gubernatis	1840	1913	Italy	
74	Pedro Pablo Figueroa (Note: The nomination was later declared invalid by the Nobel committee because the nominator Leonardo Eliz (1861–1939) from the Valparaiso Secondary School was found to be ineligible.)	1857	1909	Chile	
75	Louis Franck	1868	1937	Belgium	
76	Max Haushofer (Note: The nomination was later declared invalid by the Nobel committee because the nominator Emil Milan (1859–1917) was found to be ineligible.)	1840	1907	Germany	
77	William Jonathan Neidig	1870	1955	United States	
78	George Lansing Raymond	1839	1929	United States	
79	Joseph Viktor Widmann	1842	1911	Switzerland	
1907
80	Eduardo Benot	1822	1907	Spain	
81	João Bonança	1836	1924	Portugal	
82	Paul Bourget	1852	1935	France	
83	Holger Drachmann	1846	1908	Denmark	
84	Ángel Guimerá	1845	1924	Spain	
85	Ian Maclaren	1850	1907	Scotland	
86	Andrés Manjón	1846	1923	Spain	
87	Georgios Souris	1852	1919	Greece	
1908
88	Julio Calcaño	1840	1918	Venezuela	
89	Edmondo de Amicis	1846	1908	Italy	
90	Rudolf Christoph Eucken (Note: Awarded the 1908 Nobel Prize in Literature "in recognition of his earnest search for truth, his penetrating power of thought, his wide range of vision, and the warmth and strength in presentation with which in his numerous works he has vindicated and developed an idealistic philosophy of life")	1846	1926	Germany	
91	Elisabeth Förster-Nietzsche♀	1846	1935	Germany	
92	Alfred Hutchinson	1859	1930	United States	
93	Adolf von Harnack	1851	1930	Germany	
1909
94	Francesco D'Ovidio	1849	1925	Italy	
95	Eugène-Melchior de Vogüé	1848	1910	France	
96	Martin Greif	1839	1911	Germany	
97	Ernest Lavisse	1842	1922	France	
98	Salvador Rueda	1857	1933	Spain	
99	Émile Verhaeren	1855	1916	Belgium	
100	Verner von Heidenstam (Note: Awarded the 1916 Nobel Prize in Literature "in recognition of his significance as the leading representative of a new era in our literature")	1859	1940	Sweden	

=== 1910–1919 ===
No.	Nominee	Born	Died	Country	Refs.
1910
101	Wilhelm Benignus	1861	1930	Germany/United States	
102	Robert Bridges	1844	1930	England	
103	Alfred Fouillée	1838	1912	France	
104	Thomas Hardy	1840	1928	England	
105	Paul Heyse (Note: Awarded the 1910 Nobel Prize in Literature "as a tribute to the consummate artistry, permeated with idealism, which he has demonstrated during his long productive career as a lyrical poet, dramatist, novelist and writer of world-renowned short stories")	1830	1914	Germany	
106	William Dean Howells	1837	1920	United States	
107	Andrew Lang	1844	1912	Scotland	
108	Pierre Loti	1850	1923	France	
109	Édouard Rod	1857	1910	Switzerland/France	
110	Molly Elliot Seawell♀	1860	1916	United States	
111	Marie von Ebner-Eschenbach♀	1830	1916	Austria	
112	Gustav Warneck	1834	1910	Germany	
1911
113	Rafael Altamira Crevea (Note: Nominated for the Nobel Peace Prize "for his important contribution to international law, especially his extensive authorship on international law.")	1866	1951	Spain	
114	Albert de Mun	1841	1914	France	
115	Gustaf Fröding	1860	1911	Sweden	
116	Karl Adolph Gjellerup (Note: Awarded the 1917 Nobel Prize in Literature "for his varied and rich poetry, which is inspired by lofty ideals")	1857	1919	Denmark	
117	Harald Høffding	1843	1931	Denmark	
118	Henry James	1843	1916	United States/England	
119	Peter Rosegger	1843	1918	Austria	
120	Karl Schönherr	1867	1943	Austria	
121	George Bernard Shaw (Note: Awarded the 1925 Nobel Prize in Literature in 1926 "for his work which is marked by both idealism and humanity, its stimulating satire often being infused with a singular poetic beauty")	1856	1950	Ireland	
122	August Strindberg (Note: Strindberg's nomination made by Nathan Söderblom (1866–1931) was retrieved for having arrived too late.)	1849	1912	Sweden	
123	Ernst von der Recke	1848	1933	Denmark	
1912
124	Henri Bergson (Note: Awarded the 1927 Nobel Prize in Literature in 1928 "in recognition of his rich and vitalizing ideas and the brilliant skill with which they have been presented")	1859	1941	France	
125	Jean-Henri Fabre	1823	1915	France	
126	Salvatore Farina	1846	1918	Italy	
127	James George Frazer	1854	1941	Scotland	
128	Adolf Frey	1855	1920	Switzerland	
129	Sven Hedin	1865	1952	Sweden	
130	Hans Ernst Kinck	1865	1926	Norway	
131	Benito Pérez Galdós	1843	1920	Spain	
132	Pencho Slaveykov	1866	1912	Bulgaria	
133	Carl Spitteler (Note: Awarded the 1919 Nobel Prize in Literature in 1920 "in special appreciation of his epic, Olympian Spring")	1845	1924	Switzerland	
1913
134	Grazia Deledda (Note: Awarded the 1926 Nobel Prize in Literature in 1927 "for her idealistically inspired writings which with plastic clarity picture the life on her native island and with depth and sympathy deal with human problems in general")♀	1871	1936	Italy	
135	Edward Dowden	1843	1913	Ireland	
136	Émile Faguet	1847	1916	France	
137	Jakob Knudsen	1858	1917	Denmark	
138	John Lubbock, 1st Baron Avebury	1834	1913	England	
139	Edmond Picard	1836	1924	Belgium	
140	Henrik Pontoppidan (Note: Awarded the 1917 Nobel Prize in Literature "for his authentic descriptions of present-day Denmark")	1857	1943	Denmark	
141	Rabindranath Tagore (Note: Awarded the 1913 Nobel Prize in Literature "because of his profoundly sensitive, fresh and beautiful verse, by which, with consummate skill, he has made his poetic thought, expressed in his own English words, a part of the literature of the West")	1861	1941	India	
142	Francis Channing Welles	1887	1956	England	
1914 (Note: No Nobel Prize has been awarded this year.)
143	René Bazin	1853	1932	France	
144	Vilhelm Grønbech	1873	1948	Denmark	
145	Willem Kloos	1859	1938	Netherlands	
146	Josef Svatopluk Machar	1864	1942	Czechoslovakia	
147	Dora Melegari♀	1849	1924	Switzerland/Italy	
148	Dmitry Merezhkovsky	1865	1941	Russia	
149	Antonio Serra Morant (Note: Nominated for the Nobel Peace Prize "for his work La Casa de la Paz, which addressed preventing war through international legal cooperation, strengthening arbitration between nations, and creating structures for peaceful conflict resolution.")	1866	1939	Spain	
1915
150	Ferdinand Avenarius	1856	1923	Germany	
151	Charles Montagu Doughty	1843	1926	England	
152	Romain Rolland (Note: Awarded the 1915 Nobel Prize in Literature in 1916 "as a tribute to the lofty idealism of his literary production and to the sympathy and live of truth with which he has described different types of human beings")	1866	1944	France	
1916
153	Otokar Březina	1868	1929	Czechoslovakia	
154	Rabindranath Datta	1883	1917	India	
155	Ivan Franko	1856	1916	Ukraine	
156	Per Hallström	1866	1960	Sweden	
157	Gunnar Heiberg	1857	1929	Norway	
158	Erik Axel Karlfeldt (Note: Awarded the 1931 Nobel Prize in Literature for "the poetry of Erik Axel Karlfeldt")	1864	1931	Sweden	
159	Troels Frederik Lund	1840	1921	Denmark	
160	Henrik Schück	1855	1947	Sweden	
161	The Pāli Text Society	founded in 1881		England	
1917
162	Jeppe Aakjær	1866	1930	Denmark	
163	Johan Bojer	1872	1959	Norway	
164	Olaf Bull	1883	1933	Norway	
165	Bertel Gripenberg	1878	1947	Finland/Sweden	
166	Otto Ernst Schmidt	1862	1926	Germany	
167	Ivan Vazov	1850	1921	Bulgaria	
1918
168	Gustav Frenssen	1863	1945	Germany	
169	Maxim Gorky	1868	1936	Russia	
170	Gunnar Gunnarsson	1889	1975	Iceland	
171	Knut Hamsun (Note: Awarded the 1920 Nobel Prize in Literature "for his monumental work, Growth of the Soil")	1859	1952	Norway	
172	Alois Jirásek	1851	1930	Czechoslovakia	
1919
173	John Galsworthy (Note: Awarded the 1932 Nobel Prize in Literature "for his distinguished art of narration which takes its highest form in The Forsyte Saga")	1867	1933	England	
174	Arno Holz	1863	1929	Germany	
175	Ebenezer Howard	1850	1928	England	
176	Władysław Reymont (Note: Awarded the 1924 Nobel Prize in Literature "for his great national epic, The Peasants")	1867	1925	England	
177	Hugo von Hofmannsthal	1874	1929	Austria	

=== 1920–1929 ===
No.	Nominee	Born	Died	Country	Refs.
1920
178	Wilbur Cortez Abbott	1869	1947	United States	
1921
179	Jacinto Benavente (Note: Awarded the 1922 Nobel Prize in Literature "for the happy manner in which he has continued the illustrious traditions of the Spanish drama")	1866	1954	Spain	
180	Émile Boutroux	1845	1921	France	
181	Jean Revel	1848	1925	France	
182	Herbert George Wells	1866	1946	England	
183	Stefan Żeromski	1864	1925	Poland	
1922
184	Roberto Bracco	1861	1943	Italy	
185	Paul Ernst	1866	1933	Germany	
186	Darrell Figgis	1882	1925	Ireland	
187	William Ralph Inge	1860	1954	England	
188	Michael Sadleir	1888	1957	England	
189	Matilde Serao♀	1856	1927	Italy	
190	Sigrid Undset (Note: Awarded the 1928 Nobel Prize in Literature "principally for her powerful descriptions of Northern life during the Middle Ages")♀	1882	1949	Norway	
191	Georg von Below	1858	1927	Germany	
192	Ludwig von Pastor	1854	1928	Germany	
193	Israel Zangwill	1864	1926	England	
1923
194	Konstantin Balmont	1867	1942	Russia	
195	Ivan Bunin (Note: Awarded the 1933 Nobel Prize in Literature "for the strict artistry with which he has carried on the classical Russian traditions in prose writing")	1870	1953	Russia	
196	Guglielmo Ferrero (Note: Nominated for the Nobel Peace Prize "for his numerous public intellectual campaigns against militarism, especially through widely attended lectures that influenced public opinion in Italy")	1871	1942	Italy	
197	Einar Kvaran	1859	1938	Iceland	
198	Hermann Türck	1856	1933	Germany	
1924
199	Olav Duun	1876	1939	Norway	
200	Thomas Mann (Note: Awarded the 1929 Nobel Prize in Literature "principally for his great novel, Buddenbrooks, which has won steadily increased recognition as one of the classic works of contemporary literature")	1875	1955	Germany	
201	Max Neuburger	1868	1955	Austria	
1925
202	Ferenc Herczeg	1863	1954	Hungary	
203	Rudolf Maria Holzapfel	1874	1930	Austria	
204	Johannes Vilhelm Jensen (Note: Awarded the 1944 Nobel Prize in Literature "for the rare strength and fertility of his poetic imagination with which is combined an intellectual curiosity of wide scope and a bold, freshly creative style")	1873	1950	Denmark	
205	Paul Elmer More	1864	1937	United States	
206	Paul Raynal	1885	1971	France	
207	Giovanni Schembari	1894	1959	Italy/United States	
1926
208	Avetis Aharonian	1866	1948	Armenia	
209	Arnold Bennett	1867	1931	England	
210	Georg Bonne (Note: Nominated for the Nobel Peace Prize "for his intellectual and literary work that indirectly support peace by encouraging humanism, education, and anti-nationalist thinking")	1859	1945	Germany	
211	Sofía Casanova♀	1861	1958	Spain/Poland	
212	Paul Claudel	1868	1955	France	
213	Concha Espina de la Serna♀	1869	1955	Spain	
214	Vicente Huidobro	1893	1948	Chile	
215	Johannes Jørgensen	1866	1956	Denmark	
216	Josip Kosor	1879	1961	Croatia	
217	Pyotr Krasnov	1869	1947	Russia	
218	Karl Kraus	1874	1936	Austria	
219	Ada Negri♀	1870	1945	Italy	
220	Kostis Palamas	1859	1943	Greece	
221	J.-H. Rosny Aîné	1856	1940	France	
222	Edvard Westermarck	1862	1939	Finland	
223	Juan Zorrilla de San Martín	1855	1931	Uruguay	
1927
224	Édouard Estaunié	1862	1942	France	
225	Erwin Guido Kolbenheyer	1878	1962	Austria	
226	Eduard Meyer	1855	1930	Germany	
227	Cesare Pascarella	1858	1940	Italy	
228	Samuel Parsons Scott	1846	1929	United States	
229	Edith Wharton♀	1862	1937	United States	
1928
230	Rudolf Hans Bartsch	1873	1952	Austria	
231	Rufino Blanco Fombona	1874	1944	Venezuela	
232	Blanca de los Ríos♀	1859	1956	Spain	
233	Anna de Noailles♀	1876	1933	France	
234	Theodor Däubler	1876	1934	Germany	
235	Hans Driesch (Note: Nominated for the Nobel Peace Prize "for his philosophical and ethical ideas which supported peaceful international thinking and opposition to militarism.")	1867	1941	Germany	
236	Ivan Grozev	1872	1957	Bulgaria	
237	Edith Howes♀	1872	1954	New Zealand	
238	Ricarda Huch♀	1864	1947	Germany	
239	Alf Larsen	1885	1967	Norway	
240	Armando Palacio Valdés	1853	1938	Spain	
241	Felix Timmermans	1886	1947	Belgium	
242	Frederik van Eeden	1860	1932	Netherlands	
1929
243	Benedetto Croce	1866	1952	Italy	
244	Stefan George	1868	1933	Germany	
245	Knud Rasmussen	1897	1933	Denmark	
246	Cale Young Rice	1872	1943	United States	
247	Edwin Arlington Robinson	1869	1935	United States	
248	Thornton Wilder	1897	1975	United States	

=== 1930–1939 ===
No.	Nominee	Born	Died	Country	Refs.
1930
249	Clotilde Crespo de Arvelo♀	1887	1959	Venezuela	
250	Theodore Dreiser	1871	1945	United States	
251	Lion Feuchtwanger	1884	1958	Germany	
252	Yrjö Hirn	1870	1952	Finland	
253	Arvid Järnefelt	1851	1930	Finland	
254	Rudolf Kassner	1873	1959	Austria	
255	Manfred Kyber	1880	1933	Germany	
256	Sinclair Lewis (Note: Awarded the 1930 Nobel Prize in Literature "for his vigorous and graphic art of description and his ability to create, with wit and humour, new types of characters")	1885	1951	United States	
257	Edgar Lee Masters	1868	1950	United States	
258	Johann Rump	1871	1941	Germany	
259	Frans Eemil Sillanpää (Note: Awarded the 1939 Nobel Prize in Literature "for his deep understanding of his country's peasantry and the exquisite art with which he has portrayed their way of life and their relationship with Nature")	1888	1964	Finland	
260	Paul Valéry	1871	1945	France	
261	Anton Wildgans	1881	1932	Austria	
1931
262	Ivana Brlić-Mažuranić♀	1874	1938	Croatia	
263	Hermann Hesse (Note: Awarded the 1946 Nobel Prize in Literature "for his inspired writings which, while growing in boldness and penetration, exemplify the classical humanitarian ideals and high qualities of style")	1877	1962	Germany/Switzerland	
264	Francis Jammes	1868	1938	France	
265	Ramón Menéndez Pidal	1869	1968	Spain	
266	Laura Mestre Hevia♀	1867	1944	Cuba	
267	Martin Andersen Nexø	1869	1954	Denmark	
268	Ramón Pérez de Ayala	1880	1962	Spain	
269	Erich Maria Remarque (Note: Nominated for the Nobel Peace Prize "for his novel Im Westen nicht Neues ("All Quiet on the Western Front"), in which he depicted a realistic picture of the German army and the horrors of war")	1898	1970	Germany	
270	Ole Edvart Rølvaag	1876	1931	Norway/United States	
271	Ivan Shmelyov	1873	1950	Russia/France	
1932
272	Michael Blümelhuber (Note: Nominated for the Nobel Peace Prize "for his artistic and symbolic work promoted humanistic and peace-oriented values, fostering international harmony and anti-materialist ideals")	1865	1936	Austria	
273	Karel Čapek	1890	1938	Czechoslovakia	
274	Vilhelm Ekelund	1880	1949	Sweden	
275	Percival Elgood	1863	1941	England/Egypt	
276	Manuel Gálvez	1882	1962	Argentina	
277	Axel Munthe	1857	1949	Sweden/England	
278	Francesco Orestano	1873	1945	Italy	
279	Grigol Robakidze	1880	1962	Georgia	
280	Upton Sinclair	1878	1968	United States	
1933
281	Max Beerbohm	1872	1956	England	
282	Joseph Bédier	1864	1938	France	
283	Hayim Nahman Bialik	1873	1934	Russia/Israel	
284	Henrique Coelho Neto	1863	1934	Brazil	
285	António Correia de Oliveira	1878	1960	Portugal	
286	Carlos María Ocantos	1860	1949	Argentina	
287	José Ortega Gasset	1883	1955	Spain	
288	Ernest Roguin	1851	1939	Switzerland	
289	Sarvepalli Radhakrishnan (Note: Nominated for the Nobel Peace Prize "for promoting international understanding by emphasizing the unity of spiritual values and the great truths revealed to all through his extraordinary literary works that contributed to draw the world together and has laid the ideological indications of world peace")	1888	1975	India	
290	Hermann Stehr	1864	1940	Germany	
1934
291	Maria Madalena de Martel Patrício♀	1884	1947	Portugal	
292	Francisco García-Calderón Rey	1883	1953	Peru	
293	Ventura García-Calderón Rey	1886	1959	Peru	
294	Franz Karl Ginzkey	1871	1963	Austria	
295	Ole Hallesby	1879	1961	Norway	
296	Jarl Hemmer	1893	1944	Finland	
297	Hans Henrik Holm	1896	1980	Norway	
298	Roger Martin du Gard (Note: Awarded the 1937 Nobel Prize in Literature "for the artistic power and truth with which he has depicted human conflict as well as some fundamental aspects of contemporary life in his novel-cycle Les Thibault")	1881	1958	France	
299	Eugene O'Neill (Note: Awarded the 1936 Nobel Prize in Literature in 1937 "for the power, honesty and deep-felt emotions of his dramatic works, which embody an original concept of tragedy")	1888	1953	United States	
300	Luigi Pirandello (Note: Awarded the 1934 Nobel Prize in Literature "for his bold and ingenious revival of dramatic and scenic art")	1867	1936	Italy	
301	Jean Schlumberger	1877	1968	France	
302	Ewald Sundberg	1886	1967	Norway	
303	Tadeusz Stefan Zieliński	1859	1944	Poland	
1935
304	Gilbert Keith Chesterton	1874	1936	England	
305	Violet Clifton♀	1883	1961	England	
306	James Cousins	1873	1956	Ireland/India	
307	Miguel de Unamuno	1864	1936	Spain	
308	Guðmundur Kamban	1888	1945	Iceland	
309	Sven Lönborg	1871	1959	Sweden	
310	John Masefield	1878	1967	England	
311	Émile Mâle	1862	1954	France	
312	Víctor Manuel Rendón	1859	1940	Ecuador	
313	Elise Richter♀	1865	1943	Austria	
314	Jules Romains	1885	1972	France	
315	Dezső Szabó	1879	1945	Hungary	
316	Shaul Tchernichovsky	1875	1943	Russia/Israel	
317	Edvarts Virza	1883	1940	Latvia	
1936
318	Hari Mohan Banerjee (Note: Nominated for the Nobel Peace Prize "for his book Secrets of Religion and Way to Peace, which presented religion as a foundation for moral harmony, interfaith understanding, non-violence and ethical living")	—	1950	India	
319	Aziz Domet	1890	1943	Palestine/Germany	
320	Georges Duhamel	1884	1966	France	
321	Alfred Edward Evershed (Note: Nominated for the Nobel Peace Prize "for writing extensively on peace to promote fraternity of nations, peace congresses and means to abolish the war-thought")	1870	1941	Australia	
322	Hans Fallada	1893	1947	Germany	
323	Sigmund Freud (Note: Nominated for the Nobel Prize in Physiology or Medicine "for work on psychotherapy and the subconscious (dream interpretation, phobias, and psychoanalysis)")	1856	1939	Austria	
324	Ludwig Klages	1872	1956	Germany	
325	Arvid Mörne	1876	1946	Finland	
326	Cécile Tormay♀	1875	1937	Hungary	
327	Enrica von Handel-Mazzetti♀	1871	1955	Austria	
1937
328	René Béhaine	1880	1966	France	
329	Johan Falkberget	1879	1967	Norway	
330	Jean Giono	1895	1970	France	
331	Maria Jotuni♀	1880	1943	Finland	
332	Maurice Magre	1877	1941	France	
333	Bijay Chandra Majumdar	1861	1942	India	
334	Jules Payot	1859	1940	France	
335	William Pickard	1889	1973	England	
336	Valdemar Rørdam	1872	1946	Denmark	
337	Sally Salminen♀	1906	1976	Finland	
338	Arnold Schering	1877	1941	Germany	
339	Stijn Streuvels	1871	1969	Belgium	
340	Maila Talvio♀	1871	1951	Finland	
341	Albert Verwey	1865	1937	Netherlands	
1938
342	Mark Aldanov	1886	1957	Russia/United States	
343	Pearl Buck (Note: Awarded the 1938 Nobel Prize in Literature "for her rich and truly epic descriptions of peasant life in China and for her biographical masterpieces") (Note: Nominated for the Nobel Peace Prize "for her establishment of the Pearl S. Buck Foundation which, through opportunity centers seeks to gather all orphan Amerasians to house them, educate them and teach them skills")♀	1892	1973	United States	
344	Henriette Charasson♀	1884	1972	France	
345	Sanjib Chaudhuri (Note: Nominated for the Nobel Peace Prize "for his authorship of treaties important towards the causes of world order, world peace and one supranational government for the world")	—	—	India	
346	Aldous Huxley	1894	1963	England/United States	
347	Muhammad Hussain Khan	1883	1960	Afghanistan	
348	Veikko Koskenniemi	1885	1962	Finland	
349	Margaret Mitchell♀	1900	1949	United States	
350	Robert Ritchie Racey	1873	1956	Canada	
351	Herman Teirlinck	1879	1967	Belgium	
352	Arthur van Schendel	1874	1946	Netherlands	
1939
353	Eugène Baie	1874	1964	Belgium	
354	Maria Dąbrowska♀	1889	1965	Poland	
355	Flávio de Carvalho	1899	1973	Brazil	
356	Hu Shih	1891	1962	China	
357	Johan Huizinga	1872	1945	Netherlands	
358	Egidio Poblete	1868	1940	Chile	
359	Ethel Florence Richardson♀	1870	1946	Australia	
360	Henriette Roland Holst♀	1869	1952	Netherlands	
361	Herbert Samuel, 1st Viscount Samuel	1870	1963	England	
362	Hugh Walpole	1884	1941	England	

=== 1940–1949 ===
No.	Nominee	Born	Died	Country	Refs.
1940
363	Albert Bailly	1886	1978	Belgium	
364	Edmund Blunden	1896	1974	England	
365	Gösta Carlberg	1909	1973	Sweden	
366	Lin Yutang	1895	1976	China	
367	Gabriela Mistral (Note: Awarded the 1945 Nobel Prize in Literature "for her lyrical poetry which, inspired by powerful emotions, has made her a name of symbol of the idealistic aspirations of the entire Latin American world")♀	1889	1957	Chile	
368	Carl Sandburg	1878	1967	United States	
369	Alfonso Strafile	1872	—	Italy/United States	
1941
370	Branislav Petronijević	1875	1954	Serbia	
371	Manoel Cyrillo Wanderley	—	—	Brazil	
372	Ruth Comfort Young♀	1882	1954	United States	
1942
373	Nikolai Berdyaev	1874	1948	Russia	
374	Hans Carossa	1878	1956	Germany	
375	Teixeira de Pascoaes	1877	1952	Portugal	
376	Enrique Larreta	1875	1961	Argentina	
377	Charles Langbridge Morgan	1894	1958	England	
378	Sigfrid Siwertz	1882	1970	Sweden	
1943
379	Sri Aurobindo (Note: Nominated for the Nobel Peace Prize "for his spiritual philosophy of human evolution and unity, offering a non-political, non-violent vision of global peace grounded in consciousness rather than conflict resolution")	1872	1950	India	
380	Elisaveta Bagryana♀	1893	1991	Bulgaria	
381	Franz Hellens	1881	1972	Belgium	
382	John Steinbeck (Note: Awarded the 1962 Nobel Prize in Literature "for his realistic and imaginative writings, combining as they do sympathetic humour and keen social perception")	1902	1968	United States	
383	Franz Werfel	1890	1945	Czechoslovakia/United States	
1944
384	Willa Cather (Note: Permanent Secretary of the Swedish Academy Anders Österling revealed to the New York Times days before the announcement that Willa Cather, together with Ernest Hemingway, John Steinbeck, and Gabriela Mistral, was among the contenders for the 1944 prize. Despite the revelation, Cather's name has not included in the archives")♀	1873	1947	United States	
385	Abol-Gassem E'tessam Zadeh	—	—	Iran	
386	Luis Nueda Santiago	1883	1952	Spain	
387	Arnulf Øverland	1889	1968	Norway	
388	Charles Ferdinand Ramuz	1878	1947	Switzerland	
1945
389	Armando Álvarez Pedroso (Note: Nomination was declared invalid by the Nobel Committee)	1907	1990	Cuba	
390	Thomas Stearns Eliot (Note: Awarded the 1948 Nobel Prize in Literature "for his outstanding, pioneer contribution to present-day poetry")	1888	1965	United States/England	
391	Edward Morgan Forster	1879	1970	England	
392	Yiorgos Theotokas	1906	1966	Greece	
393	Marie Under♀	1883	1980	Estonia	
1946
394	Sholem Asch	1880	1957	Poland/United States	
395	Winston Churchill (Note: Awarded the 1953 Nobel Prize in Literature "for his mastery of historical and biographical description as well as for brilliant oratory in defending exalted human values") (Note: Nominated for the Nobel Peace Prize "for his leadership in defeating fascism and shaping the post-World War II order, which was essential to establishing and preserving long-term peace in Europe")	1874	1965	England	
396	André Gide (Note: Awarded the 1947 Nobel Prize in Literature "for his comprehensive and artistically significant writings, in which human problems and conditions have been presented with a fearless love of truth and keen psychological insight")	1869	1951	France	
397	Herbert John Grierson	1866	1960	Scotland	
398	François Mauriac (Note: Awarded the 1952 Nobel Prize in Literature "for the deep spiritual insight and the artistic intensity with which he has in his novels penetrated the drama of human life")	1885	1970	France	
399	Boris Pasternak (Note: Awarded the 1958 Nobel Prize in Literature "for his important achievement both in contemporary lyrical poetry and in the field of the great Russian epic tradition")	1890	1960	Russia	
400	Angelos Sikelianos	1884	1951	Greece	
401	Ignazio Silone	1900	1978	Italy	
402	Tarjei Vesaas	1897	1970	Norway	
1947
403	Shmuel Yosef Agnon (Note: Awarded the 1966 Nobel Prize in Literature "for his profoundly characteristic narrative art with motifs from the life of the Jewish people")	1887	1970	Israel	
404	Georgios Drosinis	1859	1951	Greece	
405	Ernest Hemingway (Note: Awarded the 1954 Nobel Prize in Literature "for his mastery of the art of narrative, most recently demonstrated in The Old Man and the Sea, and for the influence that he has exerted on contemporary style")	1899	1961	United States	
406	Toyohiko Kagawa (Note: Nominated for the Nobel Peace Prize "for his work among the poor, for reconciliation among nations and opposition to militarism through nonviolence, social reform, and international moral advocacy")	1888	1960	Japan	
407	Horace Kallen	1882	1974	United States	
408	Nikos Kazantzakis	1883	1957	Greece	
409	Pär Lagerkvist (Note: Awarded the 1951 Nobel Prize in Literature "for the artistic vigour and true independence of mind with which he endeavours in his poetry to find answers to the eternal questions confronting mankind")	1891	1974	Sweden	
410	André Malraux	1901	1976	France	
411	Bernard O'Dowd	1866	1953	Australia	
412	Mikhail Sholokhov (Note: Awarded the 1965 Nobel Prize in Literature "for the artistic power and integrity with which, in his epic of the Don, he has given expression to a historic phase in the life of the Russian people")	1905	1984	Russia	
413	Gregorios Xenopoulos	1867	1951	Greece	
1948
414	Riccardo Bacchelli	1891	1985	Italy	
415	Sidonie-Gabrielle Colette♀	1873	1954	France	
416	Dorothy Canfield Fisher♀	1879	1958	United States	
417	Halldór Laxness (Note: Awarded the 1955 Nobel Prize in Literature "for his vivid epic power which has renewed the great narrative art of Iceland")	1902	1998	Iceland	
418	George Santayana	1863	1952	Spain/United States	
419	Zalman Shneur	1887	1959	United States/Israel	
420	George Macauley Trevelyan	1876	1962	England	
1949
421	Albert Camus (Note: Awarded the 1957 Nobel Prize in Literature "for his important literary production, which with clear-sighted earnestness illuminates the problems of the human conscience in our times")	1913	1960	Algeria/France	
422	Enrique González Martínez	1871	1952	Mexico	
423	Jacinto Grau	1877	1958	Spain	
424	Taha Hussein	1889	1973	Egypt	
425	Leonid Leonov	1899	1994	Russia	
426	Alberto Moravia	1907	1990	Italy	
427	Seán O'Casey	1880	1964	Ireland	
428	Alfonso Reyes	1889	1959	Mexico	
429	Reinaldo Temprano Azcona	1911	1954	Spain	

=== 1950–1959 ===
No.	Nominee	Born	Died	Country	Refs.
1950
430	Karen Blixen♀	1885	1962	Denmark	
431	Jakobus Cornelis Bloem	1887	1966	Netherlands	
432	Hermann Broch	1886	1951	Austria/United States	
433	Martin Buber (Note: Nominated for the Nobel Peace Prize "for his effort of creating an understanding and reconciliation between Israelis and Arabs")	1878	1965	Austria/Israel	
434	Júlio Dantas	1876	1962	Portugal	
435	John Dewey	1859	1952	United States	
436	William Faulkner (Note: Awarded the 1949 Nobel Prize in Literature in 1950 "for his powerful and artistically unique contribution to the modern American novel")	1897	1962	United States	
437	Robert Frost	1874	1963	United States	
438	Robert Graves	1895	1985	England	
439	Graham Greene	1904	1991	England	
440	Karl Jaspers	1883	1969	Germany/Switzerland	
441	Alfred Noyes	1880	1958	England	
442	Edward Plunkett, 18th Baron of Dunsany	1878	1957	England/Ireland	
443	Thomas Head Raddall	1903	1994	Canada	
444	Bertrand Russell (Note: Awarded the 1950 Nobel Prize in Literature "in recognition of his varied and significant writings in which he champions humanitarian ideals and freedom of thought") (Note: Nominated for the Nobel Peace Prize "for his persistent work for the future of humanity and his courage in carrying out his opinions in action, being in constant opposition to war and a frontrunner in the fight against nuclear weapons and warfare")	1872	1970	Wales	
445	Leopold Staff	1878	1957	Poland	
446	Albert Steffen	1884	1963	Switzerland	
447	Arnold Toynbee	1889	1975	England	
448	Simon Vestdijk	1898	1971	Netherlands	
449	Gertrud von Le Fort♀	1876	1971	Germany	
450	Mika Waltari	1908	1979	Finland	
1951
451	María Enriqueta Camarillo♀	1872	1968	Mexico	
452	José Maria Ferreira de Castro	1898	1974	Portugal	
453	Rómulo Gallegos	1884	1969	Venezuela	
454	Ezequiel Martínez Estrada	1895	1964	Argentina	
455	Katharine Susannah Prichard♀	1883	1969	Australia	
456	Sotíris Skípis	1881	1952	Greece	
1952
457	Louis Artus	1870	1960	France	
458	Julien Benda	1867	1956	France	
459	Werner Bergengruen	1892	1964	Germany	
460	Van Wyck Brooks	1886	1963	United States	
461	Walter de la Mare	1873	1956	England	
462	Salvador de Madariaga (Note: Nominated for the Nobel Peace Prize "for his leadership of the disarmament section of the League of Nations and his contribution to secure peace through the development of its juridical principles")	1886	1978	Spain	
463	Juan Ramón Jiménez (Note: Awarded the 1956 Nobel Prize in Literature "for his lyrical poetry, which in Spanish language constitutes an example of high spirit and artistical purity")	1881	1958	Spain/Puerto Rico	
464	Charles Plisnier	1896	1952	Belgium	
465	Albert Schweitzer (Note: Awarded the 1952 Nobel Peace Prize "for his altruism, reverence for life, and tireless humanitarian work which has helped making the idea of brotherhood between men and nations a living one")	1875	1965	Germany/France	
466	Paul Vialar	1898	1996	France	
467	John Dover Wilson	1881	1969	England	
1953
468	Gottfried Benn	1886	1956	Germany	
469	Alberto Hidalgo	1897	1967	Peru/Argentina	
470	Max Mell	1882	1971	Austria	
1954
471	Carl Jung (Note: Nominated for the Nobel Prize in Physiology or Medicine "for work on analytical psychology (collective unconscious, archetypes, and introversion/extroversion)")	1875	1961	Switzerland	
472	Jaroslav Seifert (Note: Awarded the 1984 Nobel Prize in Literature "for his poetry which endowed with freshness, sensuality and rich inventiveness provides a liberating image of the indomitable spirit and versatility of man")	1901	1986	Czechoslovakia	
473	Ricardo Rojas	1882	1957	Argentina	
474	Gustave Vanzype	1869	1955	Belgium	
475	Georgios Vouyouklatis	1903	1956	Greece	
1955
476	Henri Bosco	1888	1976	France	
477	Arthur Bryant	1899	1985	England	
478	Ernst Robert Curtius	1886	1956	Germany	
479	Igor Gouzenko	1919	1982	Russia/Canada	
480	Leslie Poles Hartley	1895	1972	England	
481	William Somerset Maugham	1874	1965	England	
482	Eugenio Montale (Note: Awarded the 1975 Nobel Prize in Literature "for his distinctive poetry which, with great artistic sensitivity, has interpreted human values under the sign of an outlook on life with no illusions)	1896	1981	Italy	
483	Giovanni Papini (Note: Nominated for the Nobel Peace Prize "for his writings represented a shift toward spiritual and ethical ideas that could contribute indirectly to peace and European cultural renewal")	1881	1956	Italy	
484	Saint-John Perse (Note: Awarded the 1960 Nobel Prize in Literature "for the soaring flight and the evocative imagery of his poetry which in a visionary fashion reflects the conditions of our time")	1887	1975	France	
485	Ezra Pound	1885	1972	United States/Italy	
486	Adriaan Roland Holst	1888	1976	Netherlands	
487	Reinhold Schneider	1903	1958	Germany	
488	Giorgos Seferis (Note: Awarded the 1963 Nobel Prize in Literature "for his eminent lyrical writing, inspired by a deep feeling for the Hellenic world of culture")	1900	1971	Greece	
489	Edith Sitwell♀	1887	1964	England	
490	Gustav Suits	1883	1956	Estonia	
491	Giuseppe Ungaretti	1888	1970	Italy	
492	Carlos Vaz Ferreira	1872	1958	Uruguay	
1956
493	Melpo Axioti♀	1905	1973	Greece	
494	Marthe Bibesco♀	1886	1973	Romania/France	
495	Jorge Luis Borges	1899	1986	Argentina	
496	Bertolt Brecht	1898	1956	Germany	
497	Francesco Chiesa	1871	1973	Switzerland	
498	Henry de Montherlant	1895	1972	France	
499	Gonzague de Reynold	1880	1970	Switzerland	
500	Christopher Fry	1907	2005	England	
501	Armand Godoy	1880	1964	Cuba/France	
502	Elizabeth Goudge♀	1900	1984	England	
503	Jean Guitton	1901	1999	France	
504	Ernst Jünger	1895	1998	Germany	
505	Gabriel Marcel	1889	1973	France	
506	Pablo Neruda (Note: Awarded the 1971 Nobel Prize in Literature "for a poetry that with the action of an elemental force brings alive a continent's destiny and dreams")	1904	1973	Chile	
507	Marcel Pagnol	1895	1974	France	
508	Vasco Pratolini	1913	1991	Italy	
509	Jules Supervielle	1884	1960	Uruguay/France	
1957
510	Knuth Becker	1891	1974	Denmark	
511	Samuel Beckett (Note: Awarded the 1969 Nobel Prize in Literature "for his writing, which – in new forms for the novel and drama – in the destitution of modern man acquires its elevation)	1906	1989	Ireland	
512	André Chamson	1900	1983	France	
513	Mircea Eliade	1907	1986	Romania/United States	
514	Jarosław Iwaszkiewicz	1894	1980	Poland	
515	Valery Larbaud	1881	1957	France	
516	Carlo Levi	1902	1975	Italy	
517	Väinö Linna	1920	1992	Finland	
518	Jan Parandowski	1895	1978	Poland	
519	Lennox Robinson	1886	1958	Ireland	
520	Jean-Paul Sartre (Note: Awarded the 1964 Nobel Prize in Literature "for his work which, rich in ideas and filled with the spirit of freedom and the quest for truth, has exerted a far-reaching influence on our age")	1905	1980	France	
521	Frank Thiess	1890	1977	Germany	
1958
522	Ivo Andrić (Note: Awarded the 1961 Nobel Prize in Literature "for the epic force with which he has traced themes and depicted human destinies drawn from the history of his country")	1892	1975	Serbia	
523	Fernand Baldensperger	1871	1958	France	
524	Elizabeth Bowen♀	1899	1973	Ireland/England	
525	Maurice Bowra	1898	1971	England	
526	James Gould Cozzens	1903	1978	United States	
527	John Hersey	1914	1993	United States	
528	Miroslav Krleža	1893	1981	Croatia	
529	Junzaburō Nishiwaki	1894	1982	Japan	
530	John Cowper Powys	1872	1963	England	
531	Salvatore Quasimodo (Note: Awarded the 1959 Nobel Prize in Literature "for his lyrical poetry, which with classical fire expresses the tragic experience of life in our own times")	1901	1968	Italy	
532	Rudolf Alexander Schröder	1878	1962	Germany	
533	Georges Simenon	1903	1989	Belgium	
534	Jun'ichirō Tanizaki	1886	1965	Japan	
535	Lionel Trilling	1905	1975	United States	
536	Elio Vittorini	1908	1966	Italy	
537	Robert Penn Warren	1905	1989	United States	
538	Tennessee Williams	1911	1983	United States	
1959
539	María Raquel Adler♀	1900	1974	Argentina	
540	Stefan Andres	1906	1970	Germany	
541	Louis Aragon	1897	1982	France	
542	Ernest Claes	1885	1968	Belgium	
543	Juana de Ibarbourou♀	1892	1979	Uruguay	
544	Max Frisch	1911	1991	Switzerland	
545	Étienne Gilson	1884	1978	France	
546	Julien Gracq	1910	2007	France	
547	Martin Heidegger	1889	1976	Germany	
548	Hans Egon Holthusen	1913	1997	Germany	
549	Frank Raymond Leavis	1895	1978	England	
550	Charles Mauron	1899	1966	France	
551	Mario Roques	1875	1961	France	
552	Sachidananda Routray	1916	2004	India	
553	Anna Seghers♀	1900	1983	Germany	
554	Osbert Sitwell	1892	1969	England	
555	Sacheverell Sitwell	1897	1988	England	
556	Miguel Torga	1907	1995	Portugal	
557	Heimito von Doderer	1896	1966	Austria	
558	Arnold Zweig (Note: Nominated for the Nobel Peace Prize "for the powerful literary critiques of war and militarism in his novels, especially The Case of Sergeant Grischa, and his broader intellectual work aligned with anti-fascist and pacifist ideals")	1887	1968	Germany	

=== 1960–1969 ===
No.	Nominee	Born	Died	Country	Refs.
1960
559	Heinrich Böll (Note: Awarded the 1972 Nobel Prize in Literature "for his writing which through its combination of a broad perspective on his time and a sensitive skill in characterization has contributed to a renewal of German literature")	1917	1985	Germany	
560	René Char	1907	1988	France	
561	Franz Theodor Csokor	1885	1969	Austria	
562	Wesley LaViolette	1894	1978	United States	
563	Wilhelm Lehmann	1882	1968	Germany	
564	Stratis Myrivilis	1890	1969	Greece	
565	Marie Noël♀	1883	1967	France	
566	Jean Price-Mars	1876	1969	Haiti	
567	John Boyton Priestley	1894	1984	England	
568	Aquilino Ribeiro	1885	1963	Portugal	
569	Aksel Sandemose	1899	1965	Denmark	
570	James Thurber	1894	1961	United States	
571	Elias Venezis	1904	1974	Greece	
572	Karl Heinrich Waggerl	1897	1973	Austria	
1961
573	Jean Anouilh	1910	1987	France	
574	Wystan Hugh Auden	1907	1973	England/United States	
575	Gaston Bachelard	1884	1962	France	
576	Simone de Beauvoir♀	1908	1986	France	
577	Michel de Ghelderode	1898	1962	Belgium	
578	Lawrence Durrell	1912	1990	England	
579	Friedrich Dürrenmatt	1921	1990	Switzerland	
580	Pierre Jean Jouve	1887	1976	France	
581	Yasunari Kawabata (Note: Awarded the 1968 Nobel Prize in Literature "for his narrative mastery, which with great sensibility expresses the essence of the Japanese mind")	1899	1972	Japan	
582	Cora Sandel♀	1880	1974	Norway	
583	Giulia Scappino Murena (Note: Nominated for the Nobel Peace Prize "in the hope that her voice, singing about human brotherhood, will become a sign of harmony for the divided humanity")♀	1902	1982	Italy	
584	Charles Percy Snow	1905	1980	England	
585	John Ronald Reuel Tolkien	1892	1973	England	
586	Arthur Waley	1889	1966	England	
587	Edmund Wilson	1895	1972	United States	
1962
588	Josep Carner	1884	1970	Spain	
589	Jorge Guillén	1893	1984	Spain	
590	Manfred Hausmann	1898	1986	Germany	
591	William Heinesen	1900	1991	Faroe Islands	
592	Roman Jakobson	1896	1982	Russia/United States	
593	Eyvind Johnson (Note: Awarded the 1974 Nobel Prize in Literature "for a narrative art, far-seeing in lands and ages, in the service of freedom")	1900	1976	Sweden	
594	Erich Kästner	1899	1974	Germany	
595	Humphrey Davy Findley Kitto	1897	1982	England	
596	Vilhelm Moberg	1898	1973	Sweden	
597	Hans Erich Nossack	1901	1977	Germany	
598	André Schwarz-Bart	1928	2006	France	
599	Ronald Syme	1903	1989	New Zealand/England	
600	Pietro Ubaldi	1886	1972	Italy	
601	Boris Zaytsev	1881	1972	Russia	
602	Carl Zuckmayer	1896	1977	Germany	
1963
603	Ingeborg Bachmann♀	1926	1973	Austria	
604	André Breton	1896	1966	France	
605	Michel Butor	1926	2016	France	
606	Emilio Cecchi	1884	1966	Italy	
607	Jean Cocteau	1889	1963	France	
608	Charles de Gaulle	1890	1970	France	
609	Ingemar Düring	1903	1984	Sweden	
610	René Étiemble	1909	2002	France	
611	Jean Guéhenno	1890	1978	France	
612	Marcel Jouhandeau	1888	1979	France	
613	Karl Löwith	1897	1973	Germany	
614	Yukio Mishima	1925	1970	Japan	
615	Vladimir Nabokov	1899	1977	Russia/United States	
616	Rudolf Pfeiffer	1889	1979	Germany	
617	Henri Queffélec	1910	1992	France	
618	Kate Roberts♀	1891	1985	Wales	
619	Nelly Sachs (Note: Awarded the 1966 Nobel Prize in Literature "for her outstanding lyrical and dramatic writing, which interprets Israel's destiny with touching strength")♀	1891	1970	West Germany/Sweden	
620	Ramón José Sender	1901	1982	Spain/United States	
621	Léopold Sédar Senghor (Note: Nominated for the Nobel Peace Prize "for his efforts to bring people together in friendship and cultural understanding")	1906	2001	Senegal/France	
622	Gustave Thibon	1903	2001	France	
623	Erico Verissimo	1905	1975	Brazil	
624	Yevgeny Yevtushenko	1932	2017	Russia	
1964
625	Miguel Ángel Asturias (Note: Awarded the 1967 Nobel Prize in Literature "for his vivid literary achievement, deep-rooted in the national traits and traditions of Indian peoples of Latin America")	1899	1974	'Guatemala	
626	Jérôme Carcopino	1881	1970	France	
627	Camilo José Cela (Note: Awarded the 1989 Nobel Prize in Literature "for a rich and intensive prose, which with restrained compassion forms a challenging vision of man's vulnerability")	1916	2002	Spain	
628	Paul Celan	1920	1970	Romania/France	
629	Gunnar Ekelöf	1907	1968	Sweden	
630	Pierre Emmanuel	1916	1984	France	
631	James Thomas Farrell	1904	1979	United States	
632	Hossein Ghods-Nakhai	1894	1977	Iran	
633	Eugène Ionesco	1909	1994	Romania/France	
634	Robert Lowell	1917	1977	United States	
635	Hugh MacDiarmid	1892	1978	Scotland	
636	Harry Martinson (Note: Awarded the 1974 Nobel Prize in Literature "for writings that catch the dewdrop and reflects the cosmos")	1904	1978	Sweden	
637	Henri Michaux	1899	1984	Belgium/France	
638	José María Pemán	1897	1981	Spain	
639	Jacques Perret	1901	1992	France	
640	Jacques Pirenne	1891	1972	Belgium	
641	Katherine Anne Porter♀	1890	1980	United States	
642	Ina Seidel♀	1885	1974	Germany	
643	Judith Wright♀	1915	2000	Australia	
1965
644	Theodor Adorno	1903	1969	Germany	
645	Anna Akhmatova♀	1889	1966	Russia	
646	Alceu Amoroso Lima	1893	1983	Brazil	
647	Tudor Arghezi	1880	1967	Romania	
648	Alejo Carpentier	1904	1980	Cuba	
649	Gilbert Cesbron	1913	1979	France	
650	Juan Antonio de Zunzunegui	1901	1982	Spain	
651	Sudhindra Nath Ghose	1899	1965	India	
652	Giovannino Guareschi	1908	1968	Italy	
653	Pêr-Jakez Helias	1914	1995	France	
654	Gyula Illyés	1902	1983	Hungary	
655	Mohammad-Ali Jamalzadeh	1892	1997	Iran	
656	Marie Luise Kaschnitz♀	1901	1974	Germany	
657	Konstantin Paustovsky	1892	1968	Russia	
658	Zeinolabedin Rahnema	1894	1990	Iran	
659	Wilhelm Röpke	1899	1966	Germany	
660	Alan Sillitoe	1928	2010	England	
661	Gopal Singh	1917	1990	India	
662	Carl Erik Soya	1896	1983	Denmark	
663	Henri Troyat	1911	2007	Russia/France	
664	Marguerite Yourcenar♀	1903	1987	France/United States	
1966
665	Alexandre Arnoux	1884	1973	France	
666	Johan Borgen	1902	1979	Norway	
667	Carlo Emilio Gadda	1893	1973	Italy	
668	Witold Gombrowicz	1904	1969	Poland	
669	Günter Grass (Note: Awarded the 1999 Nobel Prize in Literature "whose frolicsome black fables portray the forgotten face of history")	1927	2015	Germany	
670	Thierry Maulnier	1909	1988	France	
671	Henry Muller	1902	1980	France	
672	Walter Pabst	1907	1992	Germany	
673	Pierre-Henri Simon	1903	1972	France	
674	Arnold Wesker	1932	2016	England	
1967
675	Jorge Amado	1912	2001	Brazil	
676	Saul Bellow (Note: Awarded the 1976 Nobel Prize in Literature "for the human understanding and subtle analysis of contemporary culture that are combined in his works")	1915	2005	Canada/United States	
677	Emil Boyson	1897	1979	Norway	
678	Arturo Capdevila	1889	1967	Argentina	
679	Ivan Drach	1936	2018	Ukraine	
680	Carlos Drummond de Andrade	1902	1987	Brazil	
681	Rabbe Enckell	1903	1974	Finland	
682	Hans Magnus Enzensberger	1929	2022	Germany	
683	Jean Genet	1910	1986	France	
684	Lawrence Sargent Hall	1915	1993	United States	
685	Friedrich Georg Jünger	1898	1977	Germany	
686	Basij Khalkhali	1918	1995	Iran	
687	Lina Kostenko (Note: Nominated for the Nobel Peace Prize as part of the 1000 PeaceWomen "in recognition of women's efforts and visibility in promoting peace all over the world")♀	1930	—	Ukraine	
688	György Lukács	1885	1971	Hungary	
689	Germán Pardo García	1902	1991	Colombia	
690	André Pézard	1893	1984	France	
691	Claude Simon (Note: Awarded the 1985 Nobel Prize in Literature "who in his novel combines the poet's and the painter's creativeness with a deepened awareness of time in the depiction of the human condition")	1913	2005	France	
692	Pavlo Tychyna	1891	1967	Ukraine	
1968
693	Agustí Bartra	1908	1982	Spain	
694	Mildred Breedlove♀	1904	1994	United States	
695	Luis Buñuel	1900	1983	Spain/Mexico	
696	Joseph Delteil	1894	1978	France	
697	Konstantin Fedin	1892	1977	Russia	
698	Zbigniew Herbert	1924	1998	Poland	
699	Vladimír Holan	1905	1980	Czechoslovakia	
700	Claude Lévi-Strauss	1908	2009	France	
701	Compton Mackenzie	1883	1972	Scotland	
702	Gustave Martin-Saint-René	1888	1973	France	
703	Segismundo Masel	1895	1985	Argentina	
704	Marianne Moore♀	1887	1972	United States	
705	Sławomir Mrożek	1930	2013	Poland	
706	Tadeusz Różewicz	1921	2014	Poland	
707	Friedebert Tuglas	1886	1971	Estonia	
708	Peter Vansittart	1920	2008	England	
709	Patrick White (Note: Awarded the 1973 Nobel Prize in Literature "for an epic and psychological narrative art which has introduced a new continent into literature")	1912	1990	Australia	
710	Kazimierz Wierzyński	1894	1969	Poland	
711	Angus Wilson	1913	1991	England	
1969
712	Tawfiq al-Hakim	1898	1987	Egypt	
713	Edward Albee	1928	2016	United States	
714	Jerzy Andrzejewski	1909	1983	Poland	
715	Elias Canetti (Note: Awarded the 1981 Nobel Prize in Literature "for writings marked by a broad outlook, a wealth of ideas and artistic power")	1905	1994	Bulgaria	
716	Jean Cassou	1897	1986	France	
717	Aimé Césaire	1913	2008	Martinique	
718	Georges Dumézil	1898	1986	France	
719	Louis Guilloux	1899	1980	France	
720	Hồ Hữu Tường	1910	1980	Vietnam	
721	Yasushi Inoue	1907	1991	Japan	
722	Bernhard Karlgren	1889	1978	Sweden	
723	Karl Krolow	1915	1999	Germany	
724	Siegfried Lenz	1926	2014	Germany	
725	Hugh MacLennan	1907	1990	Canada	
726	Jacques Maritain	1882	1973	France	
727	László Mécs	1895	1978	Hungary	
728	Arthur Miller	1915	2005	United States	
729	Robert Pinget	1919	1997	Switzerland/France	
730	Anthony Powell	1905	1999	England	
731	Raymond Queneau	1903	1976	France	
732	Jean Rateau-Landeville	1894	1972	France	
733	Alain Robbe-Grillet	1922	2008	France	
734	Gustave Roud	1897	1976	Switzerland	
735	Hans Ruin	1891	1980	Finland/Sweden	
736	Hannu Salama	1936	—	Finland	
737	Nathalie Sarraute♀	1900	1999	France	
738	Ton Smerdel	1904	1970	Croatia	
739	Aleksandr Solzhenitsyn (Note: Awarded the 1970 Nobel Prize in Literature "for the ethical force with which he has pursued the indispensable traditions of Russian literature")	1918	2008	Russia	
740	Zaharia Stancu	1902	1974	Romania	
741	Gerard Walschap	1898	1989	Belgium	

=== 1970–1977 ===
Nominees are published 50 years later so 1976 nominees should be published at the beginning of 2027.

No.	Nominee	Born	Died	Country	Refs.
1970
742	Youssef Durra al-Haddad	1913	1979	Lebanon	
743	Eugen Barbu	1924	1993	Romania	
744	Hugo Bergmann	1883	1975	Czechoslovakia/Israel	
745	Heðin Brú	1901	1987	Faroe Islands	
746	Fazıl Hüsnü Dağlarca	1914	2008	Turkey	
747	Denis de Rougemont	1906	1985	Switzerland	
748	Salvador Espriu	1913	1985	Spain	
749	Robert Ganzo	1898	1995	Venezuela/France	
750	Paavo Haavikko	1931	2008	Finland	
751	Tatsuzō Ishikawa	1905	1985	Japan	
752	Sei Itō†	1905	1969	Japan	
753	Alexander Lernet-Holenia	1897	1976	Austria	
754	Saunders Lewis	1893	1985	Wales	
755	Harold Macmillan	1894	1986	England	
756	Mikhail Naimy	1889	1988	Lebanon	
757	Victoria Ocampo♀	1890	1979	Argentina	
758	Emilio Oribe	1893	1975	Uruguay	
759	Pandelis Prevelakis	1909	1986	Greece	
760	Evaristo Ribera Chevremont	1890	1976	Puerto Rico	
761	Abraham Sutzkever	1913	2010	Belarus/Israel	
762	Lluís Valeri i Sahís	1891	1971	Spain	
763	Frank Waters	1902	1995	United States	
764	Sándor Weöres	1913	1989	Hungary	
765	Yi Gwangsu†	1892	1950	North Korea	
766	Amado Yuzon	1906	1979	Philippines	
1971
767	José María Arguedas†	1911	1969	Peru	
768	James Baldwin	1924	1987	United States	
769	Tarasankar Bandyopadhyay	1898	1971	India	
770	Mykola Bazhan	1904	1983	Ukraine	
771	Jawad Boulos	1900	1982	Lebanon	
772	Tsendiin Damdinsüren	1908	1986	Mongolia	
773	Paul Demiéville	1894	1979	Switzerland/France	
774	Romain Gary	1914	1980	Lithuania/France	
775	David Gascoyne-Cecil	1902	1986	England	
776	Maurice Genevoix	1890	1980	France	
777	William Golding (Note: Awarded the 1983 Nobel Prize in Literature "for his novels which, with the perspicuity of realistic narrative art and the diversity and universality of myth, illuminate the human condition in the world of today")	1911	1993	England	
778	Younghill Kang	1898	1972	North Korea/United States	
779	Richard Kim	1932	2009	North Korea/United States	
780	Arthur Koestler	1905	1983	Hungary/England	
781	Philip Larkin	1922	1985	England	
782	Archibald MacLeish	1892	1982	United States	
783	Miquel Melendres i Rué	1902	1974	Spain	
784	Fritiof Nilsson Piraten	1895	1972	Sweden	
785	Yiannis Ritsos	1909	1990	Greece	
786	Georges Schéhadé	1905	1989	Lebanon	
787	Arno Schmidt	1914	1979	Germany	
788	Robert Shih [Shi Jieyun]	1926	1983	China	
789	José García Villa	1908	1997	Philippines/United States	
790	Elie Wiesel (Note: Awarded the 1986 Nobel Peace Prize "for being a messenger of peace to mankind: his message is one of peace, atonement and dignity")	1928	2016	Romania/United States	
791	Henry Williamson	1895	1977	England	
1972
792	Said Akl	1911	2014	Lebanon	
793	Louis Paul Boon	1912	1979	Belgium	
794	Anthony Burgess	1917	1993	England	
795	Suniti Kumar Chatterji	1890	1977	India	
796	Austin Clarke	1934	2016	Barbados/Canada	
797	Odysseas Elytis (Note: Awarded the 1979 Nobel Prize in Literature "for his poetry, which, against the background of Greek tradition, depicts with sensuous strength and intellect clear-sightedness modern man's struggle for freedom and creativeness")	1911	1996	Greece	
798	Jacob Glatstein†	1896	1971	Poland/United States	
799	Chinmoy Kumar Ghose (Note: Nominated for the Nobel Peace Prize "for his contribution to the West, offering immense spiritual wealth and the message that the world's inner and outer well-being are inseparably one")	1931	2007	India/United States	
800	Nadine Gordimer (Note: Awarded the 1991 Nobel Prize in Literature "who through her magnificent epic writing has – in the words of Alfred Nobel – been of very great benefit to humanity")♀	1923	2014	South Africa	
801	Julien Green	1900	1998	France	
802	Joseph Heller	1923	1999	United States	
803	Ferenc Juhász	1928	2015	Hungary	
804	Manbohdan Lal (Note: probably Madan Lal Madhu (1925–2014))	—	—	India	
805	Doris Lessing (Note: Awarded the 2007 Nobel Prize in Literature "that epicist of the female experience, who with scepticism, fire and visionary power has subjected a divided civilisation to scrutiny")♀	1919	2013	Zimbabwe/England	
806	Astrid Lindgren♀	1907	2002	Sweden	
807	Stanislaus Lynch	1908	1983	Ireland	
808	Norman Mailer	1923	2007	United States	
809	Bernard Malamud	1914	1986	United States	
810	Frederick Manfred	1912	1994	United States	
811	Veijo Meri	1928	2015	Finland	
812	Pak Tu-jin	1916	1998	South Korea	
813	Alan Paton	1903	1988	South Africa	
814	Philip Roth	1933	2018	United States	
815	Francis Stuart	1902	2000	Ireland	
816	Vidiadhar Surajprasad Naipaul (Note: Awarded the 2001 Nobel Prize in Literature "for having united perceptive narrative and incorruptible scrutiny in works that compel us to see the presence of suppressed histories")	1932	2018	Trinidad and Tobago/England	
817	Vũ Hoàng Chương	1915	1976	Vietnam	
818	Aaron Zeitlin	1898	1973	Poland/United States	
1973
819	Conrad Aiken	1889	1973	United States	
820	Vicente Aleixandre (Note: Awarded the 1977 Nobel Prize in Literature "for a creative poetic writing which illuminates man's condition in the cosmos and in present-day society, at the same time representing the great renewal of the traditions of Spanish poetry between the wars")	1898	1984	Spain	
821	Antonio Aniante	1900	1983	Italy	
822	Miodrag Bulatović	1930	1991	Montenegro/Serbia	
823	Chiang Yee	1903	1977	China	
824	Albert Cohen	1895	1981	Greece	
825	Adolfo Costa du Rels	1891	1980	Bolivia	
826	Indira Devi Dhanrajgir♀	1930	2026	India	
827	Eugen Jebeleanu	1911	1991	Romania	
828	Yaşar Kemal	1923	2015	Turkey	
829	Zenta Mauriņa♀	1897	1978	Latvia	
830	Henry Miller	1891	1980	United States	
831	John Crowe Ransom	1888	1974	United States	
832	Isaac Bashevis Singer (Note: Awarded the 1978 Nobel Prize in Literature "for his impassioned narrative art which, with roots in a Polish-Jewish cultural tradition, brings universal human conditions to life")	1902	1991	Poland/United States	
833	Pratap Narayan Tandon	1932	—	India	
834	Paul Voivenel	1880	1975	France	
835	Martin Wickramasinghe	1890	1976	Sri Lanka	
836	Xu Xu	1908	1980	China/Hong Kong	
1974
837	Rafael Alberti	1902	1999	Spain	
838	Gwen Bristow♀	1903	1980	United States	
839	Antonio Buero Vallejo	1916	2000	Spain	
840	Chen Min-hwa♀	1934	—	Taiwan	
841	Argentina Díaz Lozano♀	1909	1999	Honduras	
842	Ralph Ellison	1913	1994	United States	
843	Jacques Floran	1918	1982	France	
844	Armand Gatti	1924	2017	France	
845	Uwe Johnson	1934	1984	Germany	
846	Brendan Kennelly	1936	2021	Ireland	
847	Eduardo Mallea	1904	1982	Argentina	
848	Herbert Marcuse	1898	1979	Germany/United States	
849	Czesław Miłosz (Note: Awarded the 1980 Nobel Prize in Literature "who with uncompromising clear-sightedness voices man's exposed condition in a world of severe conflicts")	1911	2004	Poland	
850	Rasipuram Krishnaswami Narayan	1901	2001	India	
851	Kenzaburō Ōe (Note: Awarded the 1994 Nobel Prize in Literature "who with poetic force creates an imagined world, where life and myth condense to form a disconcerting picture of the human predicament today")	1935	2023	Japan	
852	Octavio Paz (Note: Awarded the 1990 Nobel Prize in Literature "for impassioned writing with wide horizons, characterized by sensuous intelligence and humanistic integrity")	1914	1998	Mexico	
853	Harold Pinter (Note: Awarded the 2005 Nobel Prize in Literature "who in his plays uncovers the precipice under everyday prattle and forces entry into oppression's closed rooms")	1930	2008	England	
854	Francis Ponge	1899	1988	France	
855	Stephen Spender	1909	1995	England	
856	Isidor Feinstein Stone (Note: Nominated for the Nobel Peace Prize "for his investigative journalism and anti-war writings, which are courageous efforts to promote peace, justice, civil liberties, and public resistance to militarism")	1907	1989	United States	
857	Kamala Surayya-Das♀	1934	2009	India	
858	Louise Weiss (Note: Nominated for the Nobel Peace Prize "for her lifelong work for European reconciliation, democratic internationalism, women's rights, anti-fascism, and peace-oriented journalism, making a substantial contribution to the cause of peace in Europe")♀	1893	1983	France	
1975
859	Chinua Achebe	1930	2013	Nigeria	
860	Anna Banti♀	1895	1985	Italy	
861	Fernand Braudel	1902	1985	France	
862	Dobrica Ćosić	1921	2014	Serbia	
863	Miloš Crnjanski	1893	1977	Serbia	
864	Malcolm de Chazal	1902	1981	Mauritius	
865	Mohammed Dib	1920	2003	Algeria/France	
866	Gabriel García Márquez (Note: Awarded the 1982 Nobel Prize in Literature "for his novels and short stories, in which the fantastic and the realistic are combined in a richly composed world of imagination, reflecting a continent's life and conflicts")	1927	2014	Colombia	
867	Okiuyama Gwyn	1920	1993	India	
868	Wilson Harris	1921	2018	Guyana/England	
869	Masuji Ibuse	1898	1993	Japan	
870	Tove Jansson♀	1914	2001	Finland	
871	Wolfgang Koeppen	1906	1996	Germany	
872	Mihailo Lalić	1914	1992	Montenegro/Serbia	
873	Rina Lasnier♀	1915	1997	Canada	
874	Józef Mackiewicz	1902	1985	Poland	
875	Naguib Mahfouz (Note: Awarded the 1988 Nobel Prize in Literature "who, through works rich in nuance – now clear-sightedly realistic, now evocatively ambiguous – has formed an Arabian narrative art that applies to all mankind")	1911	2006	Egypt	
876	Desanka Maksimović♀	1898	1993	Serbia	
877	Kamala Markandaya♀	1923	2004	India/England	
878	Giuseppe Morabito	1900	1997	Italy	
879	Federico Morador Otero	1896	1977	Uruguay	
880	Vasko Popa	1922	1991	Serbia	
881	Chaim Potok	1929	2002	United States	
882	Satya Prakasha 'Nirad' (Note: probably Nirad Chaudhuri (1897–1999))	—	—	India	
883	Mary Renault♀	1905	1983	England/South Africa	
884	Meša Selimović	1910	1982	Bosnia and Herzegovina/Serbia	
885	Manès Sperber	1905	1984	Austria/France	
886	John Hall Wheelock	1886	1978	United States	
1976
revealed in 2027

== Statistics ==
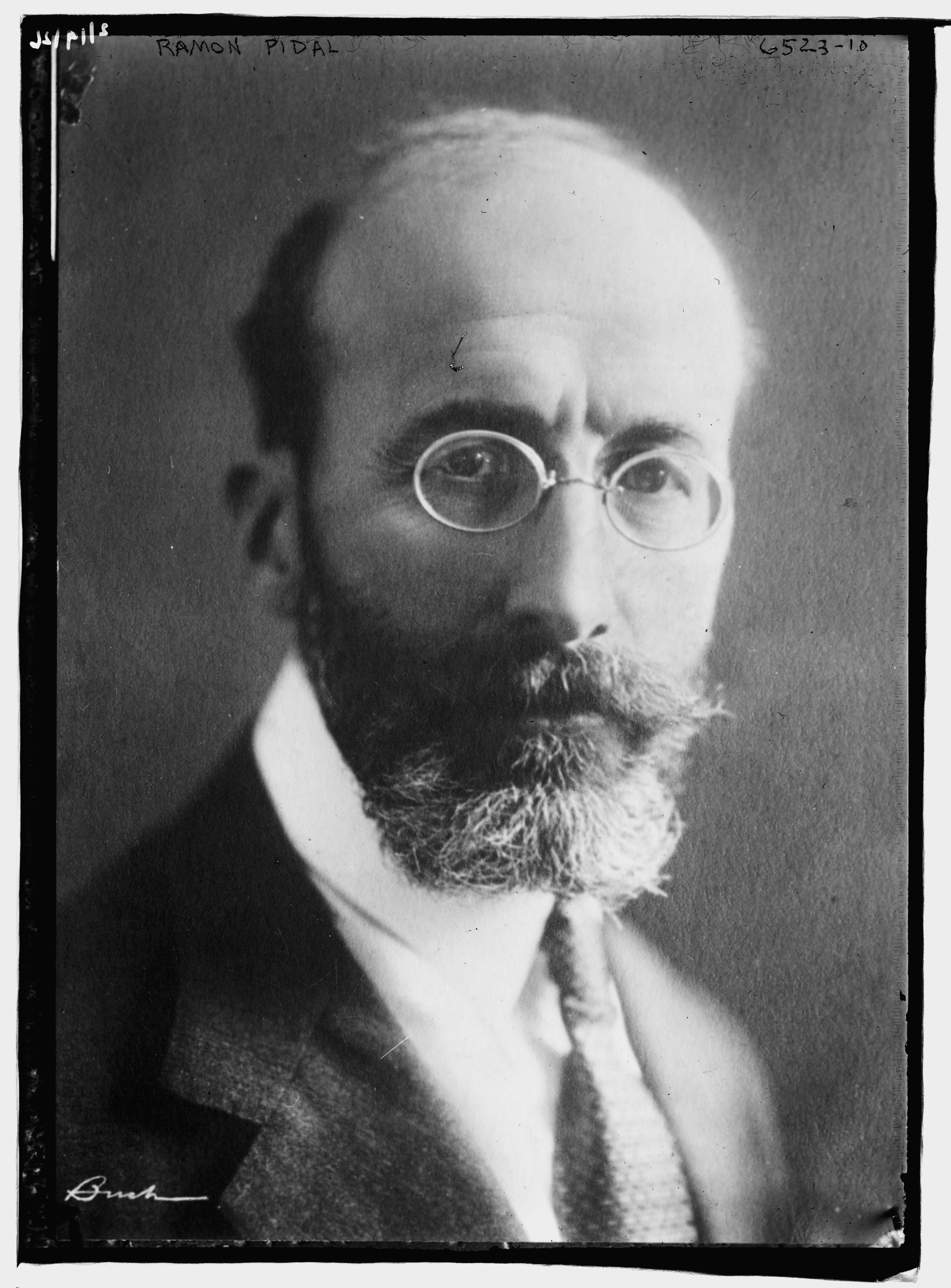
Spanish philologist Ramón Menéndez Pidal was never awarded despite the numerous nominations.

With the annual revelation of nominated writers for the Nobel Prize in Literature, interesting facts are eventually uncovered between 1901 and 1975 such as the following:

- Most nominations in a year: 205 nominations were made in 1973.
- Most nominations for a nominee: Spanish philologist Ramón Menéndez Pidal received 92 nominations in 1956.
- Total number of nominees: 881
- Highest number of nominees in a year: 114 writers were nominated in 1975.
- Highest number of new nominees in a year: 30 new writers were nominated in 1969.
- Literary societies: The Pali Text Society was nominated in 1916 and remains the only society.
- Number of women: 89
- Most women nominees in a year: 13 women were nominated in 1975.
- Oldest male nominee: At age 99, Spanish philologist Ramón Menéndez Pidal was nominated in 1968.
- Oldest female nominee: At age 92, Estonian poet Marie Under was nominated in 1975.
- Youngest male nominee: At age 29, Icelandic writer Gunnar Gunnarsson was nominated in 1918.
- Youngest female nominee: At age 31, Finnish writer Sally Salminen was nominated in 1937.

Official statistics of Nobel Prize in Literature nominees (1901–1975)
Year	Total		Nominees		Oldest	Youngest	Most nominated (by nominations)	Source
Year	Nominations	Nominees	Women	New	Oldest	Youngest	Most nominated (by nominations)	Source
1901	37	26	1	26	Charles Renouvier (86)	Edmond Rostand (33) (Note: Born on April 1868, Edmond Rostand was months younger than Ossip Lourié, born on January the same year.)	Frédéric Mistral (5)	
1902	44	34	0	25	Theodor Mommsen (85)	Ventura López Fernández (36)	Leo Tolstoy (4)	
1903	43	24	0	10	George Meredith (75) (Note: Born on February 1828, George Meredith was months older than Henrik Ibsen, born on March, and Leo Tolstoy, born on September, the same year.)	Rudyard Kipling (38)	Frédéric Mistral (5)	
1904	29	21	2	6	George Meredith (76)	Rudyard Kipling (39)	Lewis Morris (3)	
1905	35	15	2	2	Leo Tolstoy (77)	Rudyard Kipling (40)	Eliza Orzeszkowa (8)	
1906	54	24	1	11	Gaston Boissier (83)	William J. Neidig (36)	Lewis Morris (5); Giosuè Carducci (5); Joseph Widmann (5); G. Lansing Raymond (5)	
1907	37	21	1	8	Eduardo Benot (84)	Rudyard Kipling (42)	Angelo de Gubernatis (5)	
1908	23	16	2	6	Theodor Zahn (70) (Note: Born on October 1838, Theodor Zahn was months older than John Morley, born on December the same year.)	Alfred Hutchinson (49)	Selma Lagerlöf (6)	
1909	38	21	1	7	John Morley (71)	Maurice Maeterlinck (47)	Selma Lagerlöf (11)	
1910	27	25	2	12	Paul Heyse (80) (Note: Born on March 1830, Paul Heyse was months older than Marie von Ebner-Eschenbach, born on September the same year.)	Maurice Maeterlinck (48)	Georg Brandes (2); Gustav Warneck (2)	
1911	31	28	2	11	M. von Ebner-Eschenbach (81)	Karl Schönherr (42)	Salvador Rueda Santos (2); Ernst von der Recke (2); Gustaf Fröding (2); Karl Gjellerup (2); Juhani Aho (2)	
1912	40	30	0	10	Jean-Henri Fabre (89)	Karl Schönherr (45)	Pierre Loti (4)	
1913	32	28	1	9	John Lubbock (79)	Grazia Deledda (42)	Grazia Deledda (2); Pierre Loti (2); Karl Gjellerup (2); Ernest Lavisse (2)	
1914	26	24	2	7	Jean-Henri Fabre (91)	Vilhelm Grønbech (42)	Harald Høffding (2); Ángel Guimerá Jorge (2); Carl Spitteler (2)	
1915	26	22	1	3	Benito Pérez Galdós (72) (Note: Born on May 1843, Benito Pérez Galdós was months older than Charles Montagu Doughty, born on August the same year.)	Vilhelm Grønbech (42)	Grazia Deledda (3)	
1916	47	28	1	9 (Note: The Pāli Text Society, a text publication society established in 1881, was nominated by its founder Thomas William Rhys Davids. It remains the only literary society nominated for the Nobel Prize in Literature.)	Edmond Picard (80)	Rabindranath Datta (33)	Verner von Heidenstam (6)	
1917	26	20	2	6	Edmond Picard (81)	Olaf Bull (34)	Georg Brandes (3)	
1918	19	17	1	5	Georg Brandes (76)	Gunnar Gunnarsson (29)	Juhani Aho (3)	
1919	18	12	0	5	Carl Spitteler (74) (Note: Born on April 1845, Carl Spitteler was weeks older than Ángel Guimerá Jorge, born on May the same year.)	Hugo von Hofmannsthal (45)	Hans Ernst Kinck (4)	
1920	27	16	1	1	Thomas Hardy (80)	Grazia Deledda (49)	Thomas Hardy (9)	
1921	22	18	1	5	Anatole France (77)	Gunnar Gunnarsson (32)	Anatole France (3)	
1922	30	22	3	10	Thomas Hardy (82)	Gunnar Gunnarsson (33)	Georg Brandes (4)	
1923	36	20	3	5	Thomas Hardy (83)	Bertel Gripenberg (45)	Guglielmo Ferrero (7)	
1924	22	18	2	3	Thomas Hardy (84)	Olav Duun (48)	Guglielmo Ferrero (3)	
1925	25	21	3	6	Thomas Hardy (85)	Giovanni Schembari (31)	Guglielmo Ferrero (5)	
1926	37	29	4	16	Thomas Hardy (86)	Vicente Huidobro (33)	Concha Espina (4)	
1927	29	21	4	6	Thomas Hardy (87)	Olaf Bull (44)	Ada Negri (4)	
1928	48	36	6	13	Paul Bourget (76)	Felix Timmermans (42)	Paul Ernst (3); Henri Bergson (3)	
1929	30	24	1	6	Ludwig von Pastor (75)	Knud Rasmussen (32) (Note: Born on June 1897, Knud Rasmussen was months younger than Thornton Wilder, born on April the same year.)	Benedetto Croce (3)	
1930	47	30	3	13	Ernst von der Recke (82)	Frans Eemil Sillanpää (42)	Paul Valéry (6)	
1931	49	29	3	10	Kostis Palamas (72) (Note: Born on January 1859, Kostis Palamas was months older than Georg Bonne, born on August the same year.)	Erich Maria Remarque (33)	Ramón Menéndez Pidal (8)	
1932	48	31	1	9	Axel Munthe (72)	Karel Čapek (42)	Ivan Bunin (5)	
1933	47			10				
1934	44	32	1	13	Ernest Roguin (83)	Karel Čapek (44)	A. Correia de Oliveira (5)	
1935	52	38	5	14	James George Frazer (81)	Jarl Hemmer (43)	Frans Emil Sillanpää (4); Johannes V. Jensen (4)	
1936	47	27	2	10	Sigmund Freud (80)	Jarl Hemmer (43) (Note: Born on September 1859, Jarl Hemmer was months younger than Hans Fallada, born on July the same year.)	Frans Emil Sillanpää (5)	
1937	62	37	7	14	Kostis Palamas (78) (Note: Born on January 1859, Kostis Palamas was months older than Jules Payot, born on April the same year.)	Sally Salminen (31)	Johannes V. Jensen (7)	
1938	47	29	6	11	Kostis Palamas (79)	Sally Salminen (32)	Frans Eemil Sillanpää (6)	
1939	45	33	7	10	Benedetto Croce (73)	Sally Salminen (33)	Johannes V. Jensen (4)	
1940	26	19	3	7	Kostis Palamas (81)	Gösta Carlberg (31)	Henriette Charasson (3)	
1941	21	15	4	3	Paul Claudel (73)	Edmund Blunden (45)	Johannes V. Jensen (3)	
1942	30	16	2	6	Johannes Jørgensen (76)	Edmund Blunden (46)	Johannes V. Jensen (7)	
1943	21	20	4	5	Carlos María Ocantos (83)	John Steinbeck (41)	Johannes V. Jensen (2)	
1944	24	21	5	5	Paul Valéry (73)	John Steinbeck (42)	Enrique Larreta (2); Johannes V. Jensen (2); Henriette Charasson (2)	
1945	27	22	5	4	Paul Valéry (74)	Yiorgos Theotokas (39)	Franz Werfel (3); Paul Valéry (3)	
1946	32	22	2	9	Ricarda Huch (83)	Ignazio Silone (46)	Charles F. Ramus (4)	
1947	43	35	4	11	Georgios Drossinis (88)	Mikhail Sholokhov (42)	Henriette Charasson (3); Charles F. Ramuz (3)	
1948	45	32	3	7	Georgios Drossinis (89)	Mikhail Sholokhov (43)	Winston Churchill (6)	
1949	43	35	3	9	George Santayana (86)	Albert Camus (36)	Arnulf Øverland (3)	
1950	79	54	4	20	John Dewey (91)	Albert Camus (37)	Pär Lagerkvist (7)	
1951	44	25	2	6	Paul Claudel (83)	Mika Waltari (43)	Pär Lagerkvist (9)	
1952	57	40	1	14	Benedetto Croce (86)	Albert Camus (39)	Concha Espina (4); Ramón Menéndez Pidal (4)	
1953	34	24	0	3	Julien Benda (86)	Graham Greene (49)	Rudolf Kassner (3); Tarjei Vesaas (3); Johan Falkberget (3)	
1954	35	27	2	3	Julien Benda (87)	Albert Camus (41)	Halldór Laxness (6)	
1955	59	46	3	17	Julien Benda (88)	Igor Gouzenko (36)	Halldór Laxness (5)	
1956	158	44	4	14	Ramón Menéndez Pidal (87)	Albert Camus (43) (Note: Born on November 1913, Albert Camus was born a month younger than Vasco Pratolini, born on October the same year.)	Ramón Menéndez Pidal (92)	
1957	66	49	4	12	Ramón Menéndez Pidal (88)	Väinö Linna (37)	André Malraux (4)	
1958	70	42	5	17	Ramón Menéndez Pidal (89)	John Hersey (44)	Robert Frost (5)	
1959	83	56	8	20	Ramón Menéndez Pidal (90)	Sachidananda Routray (43)	Maria Dabrowska (7)	
1960	70	58	4	14	Ramón Menéndez Pidal (91)	Heinrich Böll (43)	Johan Falkberget (4)	
1961	93	56	5	15	Ramón Menéndez Pidal (92)	Friedrich Dürrenmatt (40)	Robert Frost (8)	
1962	86	66	3	15	Ramón Menéndez Pidal (93)	André Schwarz-Bart (34)	E. Morgan Forster (4)	
1963	121	81	5	22	Ramón Menéndez Pidal (94)	Yevgeny Yevtushenko (31)	Robert Frost (8)	
1964	98	75	4	19	Ramón Menéndez Pidal (95)	Michel Butor (38)	Väinö Linna (3); Friedrich Dürrenmatt (3); André Malraux (3); Mikhail Sholokhov (3)	
1965	120	93	8	21	Ramón Menéndez Pidal (96)	Alan Sillitoe (37)	André Malraux (6)	
1968	99	72	3	10	Ramón Menéndez Pidal (97)	Arnold Wesker (37)	Samuel Beckett (4); André Malraux (4)	
1967	112	69	5	18	Ramón Menéndez Pidal (98)	Ivan Drach (31)	José María Pemán (8)	
1968	112	76	5	19	Ramón Menéndez Pidal (99)	Sławomir Mrożek (38)	Samuel Beckett (6); Compton Mackenzie (6); Tarjei Vesaas (6)	
1969	184	103	5	30	Stijn Streuvels (98)	Ivan Drach (33) (Note: Born on October 16, Ivan Drach was weeks younger than Hannu Salama, born on October 4 the same year.)	André Malraux (8); Giuseppe Ungaretti (8); Tarjei Vesaas (8)	
1970	128	77	2	25	Compton Mackenzie (87)	Paavo Haavikko (39)	Tarjei Vesaas (9)	
1971	137	91	1	25	Jacques Maritain (89)	Richard E. Kim (39)	Jorge Luis Borges (6); Eugenio Montale (6)	
1972	158	100	5	27	Compton Mackenzie (89)	Philip Roth (39)	W. Hugh Auden (10)	
1973	205	101	6	18	Marie Under (90)	Hannu Salama (37)	Elie Wiesel (32)	
1974	188	101	10	22	Marie Under (91)	Brendan Kennelly (38)	Elie Wiesel (17)	
1975	–	114	13	28	Marie Under (92)	Brendan Kennelly (39)	Elie Wiesel (22)	
1976	to be determined by 2027							

== See also ==
- List of Nobel laureates in Literature
