= 1940 Nobel Prize in Literature =

- First award: 1901
- Website: Official website

The 1940 Nobel Prize in Literature was not awarded because the Nobel committee's deliberations were upset by the start of World War II on September 1, 1939. Instead, the prize money was allocated with 1/3 to the Main Fund and with 2/3 to the Special Fund of this prize section. This was the fourth occasion in Nobel history that the prize was not conferred.

== Nominations ==
The Nobel Committee of the Swedish Academy received 26 nominations for 19 writers.

Seven of the nominees were nominated first-time such as Carl Sandburg, Gabriela Mistral (awarded in 1945), Lin Yutang, Bert Bailey, and Edmund Blunden. The highest number of the nominations – three nominations – was for the French writer Henriette Charasson. Three of the nominees were women, namely Gabriela Mistral, Henriette Charasson, and Maria Madalena de Martel Patrício.

The authors Isaak Babel, Walter Benjamin, E. F. Benson, Marie Bregendahl, John Buchan, Mikhail Bulgakov, Tomás Carrasquilla, Charley Chase, Lucio D'Ambra, William Henry Davies, Mary Bathurst Deane, Charles Edgar du Perron, F. Scott Fitzgerald, Hamlin Garland, Emma Goldman, Anton Hansen (known as A. H. Tammsaare), Thomas Little Heath, Nicolae Iorga, Ze'ev Jabotinsky, Panuganti Lakshminarasimha Rao, Jan Lorentowicz, Edwin Markham, Hendrik Marsman, Ricardo Miró, Eileen Power, Ameen Rihani, T. O'Conor Sloane, Santōka Taneda, Menno ter Braak, Leon Trotsky, Nathanael West, and Humbert Wolfe died in 1940 without having been nominated for the prize.

Official list of nominees and their nominators for the prize
| No. | Nominee | Country | Genre(s) | Nominator(s) |
|---|---|---|---|---|
| 1 | Albert Edward Bailey (1868–1953) | Australia | drama, screenplay | Georges Rency (1875–1951) |
| 2 | Edmund Blunden (1896–1974) | United Kingdom | poetry, essays, biography | Heinrich Wolfgang Donner (1904–1980) |
| 3 | Gösta Carlberg (1909–1973) | Sweden | novel, poetry, short story, essays | Einar Tegen (1884–1965) |
| 4 | Henriette Charasson (1884–1972) | France | poetry, essays, drama, novel, literary criticism, biography | Pierre Moreau (1895–1972); Serge Barrault (1887–1976); Jacques Chevalier (1882–1962) |
| 5 | António Correia de Oliveira (1878–1960) | Portugal | poetry | António Mendes Correia (1888–1960) |
| 6 | Maria Madalena de Martel Patrício (1884–1947) | Portugal | poetry, essays | António Baião (1878–1961) |
| 7 | Georges Duhamel (1884–1966) | France | novel, short story, poetry, drama, literary criticism | Anders Österling (1884–1981) |
| 8 | Johan Falkberget (1879–1967) | Norway | novel, short story, essays | Eivind Berggrav (1884–1959); Fredrik Paasche (1886–1943) |
| 9 | Vilhelm Grønbech (1873–1948) | Denmark | history, essays, poetry | Sven Lönborg (1871–1959) |
| 10 | Johan Huizinga (1872–1945) | Netherlands | history | Hjalmar Hammarskjöld (1862–1953); 5 members of the Royal Netherlands Academy of Arts and Sciences |
| 11 | Johannes Vilhelm Jensen (1873–1950) | Denmark | novel, short story, essays | Vilhelm Andersen (1864–1953); Carl Adolf Bodelsen (1894–1978) |
| 12 | Lin Yutang (1895–1976) | China | novel, philosophy, essays, translation | Sven Hedin (1865–1952); Pearl Buck (1892–1973) |
| 13 | Gabriela Mistral (1889–1957) | Chile | poetry | Yolando Pino Saavedra (1901–1992); Luís Galdames Galdames (1881–1941) |
| 14 | Kostis Palamas (1859–1943) | Greece | poetry, essays | Iōannēs Kalitsounakēs (1878–1966) |
| 15 | Carl Sandburg (1878–1967) | United States | poetry, essays, biography | Sinclair Lewis (1885–1951) |
| 16 | Alfonso Strafile (1872–) | Italy; United States | essays | Domenico Vittorini (1892–1958) |
| 17 | Stijn Streuvels (1871–1969) | Belgium | novel, short story | Fredrik Böök (1883–1961) |
| 18 | Felix Timmermans (1886–1947) | Belgium | novel, short story, drama, poetry, essays | Paul Sobry (1895–1954) |
| 19 | Paul Valéry (1871–1945) | France | poetry, philosophy, essays, drama | Rolf Lagerborg (1874–1959) |

== Prize decision ==
The Nobel committee unanimously proposed that the Nobel Prize in Literature for 1940 should be awarded to the Chilean poet Gabriela Mistral, but ultimately no prize was awarded that year. Gabriela Mistral was subsequently awarded the 1945 Nobel Prize in Literature.
