= 1942 Nobel Prize in Literature =

- First award: 1901
- Website: Official website

The 1942 Nobel Prize in Literature was not awarded due to the ongoing Second World War. Instead, the prize money was allocated with 1/3 to the Main Fund and with 2/3 to the Special Fund of this prize section. This was the sixth occasion in Nobel history that the prize was not conferred.

== Nominations ==
Despite no author(s) being awarded since 1939 due to the ongoing Second World War, a number of literary critics, societies and academics continued sending nominations to the Nobel Committee of the Swedish Academy, hoping that their nominated candidate may be considered for the prize. In total, the academy received 30 nominations for 16 writers.

Six of the nominees were newly nominated namely Nikolai Berdyaev, Sigfrid Siwertz, Teixeira de Pascoaes, Charles Langbridge Morgan, Enrique Larreta, Hans Carossa. The highest number of nominations was for the Danish author Johannes Vilhelm Jensen, who was awarded in 1944, with seven nomination. It was followed by Argentinian academic Enrique Larreta who received 5 nominations from literary academies and various universities. Two of the nominees were women namely the Chilean poet Gabriela Mistral (awarded in 1945) and Portuguese writer Maria Madalena de Martel Patrício.

The authors Yosano Akiko, Nini Roll Anker, Eleanor Stackhouse Atkinson, Franz Boas, Libero Bovio, Léon Daudet, Fabio Fiallo, Rachel Field, Sakutarō Hagiwara, Cosmo Hamilton, Miguel Hernández, Daniil Kharms, Olha Kobylianska, Oskar Kraus, Clementine Krämer, Yanka Kupala, Bronisław Malinowski, Lucy Maud Montgomery Robert Musil, Irène Némirovsky, Bruno Schulz, Edith Stein, Jakob van Hoddis, Carolyn Wells, Xiao Hong, and Stefan Zweig died in 1942 without having been nominated for the prize.

Official list of nominees and their nominators for the prize
No.	Nominee	Country	Genre(s)	Nominator(s)
1	Nikolai Berdyaev (1874–1948)	Soviet Union (Ukraine)	philosophy, theology	Alf Nyman (1884–1968)
2	Edmund Blunden (1896–1974)	United Kingdom	poetry, essays, biography	Heinrich Wolfgang Donner (1904–1980)
3	Hans Carossa (1878–1956)	Germany	poetry, autobiography, essays	Anders Österling (1884–1981)
4	António Correia de Oliveira (1878–1960)	Portugal	poetry	Hjalmar Hammarskjöld (1862–1953); António Mendes Correia (1888–1960)
5	Maria Madalena de Martel Patrício (1884–1947)	Portugal	poetry, essays	António Baião (1878–1961)
6	Teixeira de Pascoaes (1877–1952)	Portugal	poetry	João António Mascarenhas Júdice (1898–1957)
7	Georges Duhamel (1884–1966)	France	novel, short story, poetry, drama, literary criticism	Anders Österling (1884–1981)
8	Johan Falkberget (1879–1967)	Norway	novel, short story, essays	Andreas Hofgaard Winsnes (1889–1972); Rolv Laache (1886–1964); Eivind Berggrav (1884–1959)
9	Hermann Hesse (1877–1962)	Germany; Switzerland	novel, poetry, essays, short story	Sigfrid Siwertz (1882–1970)
10	Johan Huizinga (1872–1945)	Netherlands	history	Willem van Eysinga (1878–1961)
11	Johannes Vilhelm Jensen (1873–1950)	Denmark	novel, short story, essays	Didrik Arup Seip (1884–1963); Jens Thiis (1870–1942); Frederik Poulsen (1876–1950); Francis Bull (1887–1974); Heinrich Bach (1905–1984); Carl Adolf Bodelsen (1894–1978); Vilhelm Andersen (1864–1953)
12	Johannes Jørgensen (1866–1956)	Denmark	novel, poetry, biography	Claes Lindskog (1870–1954)
13	Enrique Larreta (1875–1961)	Argentina	history, essays, drama, novel	Spanish-American and Spanish universities; members of the Academia Brasileira de Letras; 11 members of the Real Academia de Ciencias Morales y Políticas; 5 members of the Royal Spanish Academy; Ricardo Levene (1885–1959)
14	Gabriela Mistral (1889–1957)	Chile	poetry	Afonso Costa (1885–1955); Hjalmar Hammarskjöld (1862–1953)
15	Charles Langbridge Morgan (1894–1958)	United Kingdom	drama, novel, essays, poetry	Anders Österling (1884–1981)
16	Sigfrid Siwertz (1882–1970)	Sweden	novel, short story, drama, poetry	Carl Olaf Bøggild-Andersen (1898–1967)

== Prize decision ==
In the Nobel committee's deliberations on the nominated candidates for the 1942 Nobel Prize in Literature, the candidacy of Chilean poet Gabriela Mistral won support from four of the five committee members and Danish author Johannes V. Jensen's candidacy was supported by a majority of three committee members, but no prize was awarded in 1942. Subsequently, Johannes V. Jensen was awarded the 1944 Nobel Prize in Literature and Gabriela Mistral awarded the 1945 Nobel Prize in Literature.
