= 1943 Nobel Prize in Literature =

- First award: 1901
- Website: Official website

The 1943 Nobel Prize in Literature was not awarded due to the ongoing Second World War. Instead, the prize money was allocated with 1/3 to the Main Fund and with 2/3 to the Special Fund of this prize section. This was the seventh occasion in Nobel history that the prize was not conferred.

== Nominations ==
Despite no author(s) being awarded since 1939 due to the ongoing Second World War, a number of literary critics, societies and academics continued sending nominations to the Nobel Committee of the Swedish Academy, hoping that their nominated candidate may be considered for the prize. In total, the academy received 21 nominations for 20 writers.

Five of the nominees were newly nominated namely Sri Aurobindo, John Steinbeck (awarded in 1962), Franz Werfel, Elisaveta Bagryana, and Franz Hellens. The highest number of nominations – two nominations – was for the Danish author Johannes Vilhelm Jensen, who was awarded in 1944. Four of the nominees were women namely Gabriela Mistral (awarded in 1945), Elisaveta Bagryana, Henriette Charasson, and Maria Madalena de Martel Patrício.

The authors Carlos Arniches, Stephen Vincent Benét, Laurence Binyon, Pieter Cornelis Boutens, Robin George Collingwood, Virgilio Dávila, Jovan Dučić, Louis Esson, Nordahl Grieg, Radclyffe Hall, Georg Hermann, Ida Lee, Guido Mazzoni, Arthur Mee, Beatrix Potter, Susan Stebbing, Helene Stöcker, Annie S. Swan, Frida Uhl, Else Ury, Beatrice Webb, and Simone Weil died in 1943 without having been nominated for the prize.

Official list of nominees and their nominators for the prize
No.	Nominee	Country	Genre(s)	Nominator(s)
1	Sri Aurobindo (1872–1950)	India	philosophy, poetry, essays	Francis Younghusband (1863–1942)
2	Elisaveta Bagryana (1893–1991)	Bulgaria	poetry, translation	Stefan Mladenov (1880–1963)
3	Nikolai Berdyaev (1874–1948)	Soviet Union (Ukraine)	philosophy, theology	Alf Nyman (1884–1968)
4	René Béhaine (1880–1966)	France	novel, short story, essays	Maurice Mignon (1882–1962)
5	Edmund Blunden (1896–1974)	United Kingdom	poetry, essays, biography	Heinrich Wolfgang Donner (1904-1980)
6	Henriette Charasson (1884–1972)	France	poetry, essays, drama, novel, literary criticism, biography	Pierre Fernessole (1879–1965)
7	Maria Madalena de Martel Patrício (1884–1947)	Portugal	poetry, essays	António Baião (1878–1961)
8	Teixeira de Pascoaes (1877–1952)	Portugal	poetry	João António Mascarenhas Júdice (1898–1957)
9	Georges Duhamel (1884–1966)	France	novel, short story, poetry, drama, literary criticism	Sigfrid Siwertz (1882–1970)
10	Vilhelm Grønbech (1873–1948)	Denmark	history, essays, poetry	Sven Lönborg (1871–1959)
11	Franz Hellens (1881–1972)	Belgium	novel, poetry, literary criticism	Gustave Charlier (1885–1959)
12	Johan Huizinga (1872–1945)	Netherlands	history	Willem van Eysinga (1878–1961)
13	Johannes Vilhelm Jensen (1873–1950)	Denmark	novel, short story, essays	Carl Adolf Bodelsen (1894–1978); Vilhelm Andersen (1864–1953)
14	Enrique Larreta (1875–1961)	Argentina	history, essays, drama, novel	Anders Österling (1884–1981)
15	Gabriela Mistral (1889–1957)	Chile	poetry	Hjalmar Hammarskjöld (1862–1953)
16	Charles Langbridge Morgan (1894–1958)	United Kingdom	drama, novel, essays, poetry	Sigfrid Siwertz (1882–1970)
17	Carlos María Ocantos (1860–1949)	Argentina	novel, short story, essays	Salvador Bermúdez de Castro (1863–1945)
18	John Steinbeck (1902–1968)	United States	novel, short story, screenplay	Sigfrid Siwertz (1882–1970)
19	Paul Valéry (1871–1945)	France	poetry, philosophy, essays, drama	Ernst Bendz (1880–1966)
20	Franz Werfel (1890–1945)	Czechoslovakia	novel, short story, drama, poetry	Anders Österling (1884–1981)

== Prize decision ==
For the 1943 Nobel Prize in Literature, Chilean poet Gabriela Mistral, Danish author Johannes V. Jensen and French poet and essayist Paul Valéry were proposed by members the Nobel committee, but no prize was awarded in 1943. Subsequently, Johannes V. Jensen was awarded the 1944 Nobel Prize in Literature and Gabriela Mistral awarded the 1945 Nobel Prize in Literature.
