= 1908 Nobel Prize in Literature =

- Rudolf Christoph Eucken
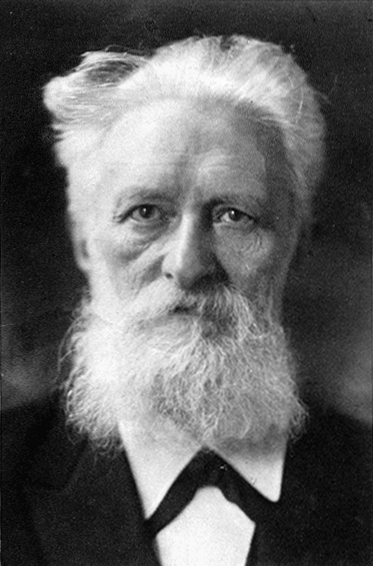
- "in recognition of his earnest search for truth, his penetrating power of thought, his wide range of vision, and the warmth and strength in presentation with which in his numerous works he has vindicated and developed an idealistic philosophy of life."
- Date: 12 November 1908 (announcement); 10 December 1908 (ceremony)
- Location: Stockholm, Sweden
- Presented by: Swedish Academy
- First award: 1901
- Website: Official website

The 1908 Nobel Prize in Literature was awarded to the German philosopher Rudolf Christoph Eucken (1846–1926) "in recognition of his earnest search for truth, his penetrating power of thought, his wide range of vision, and the warmth and strength in presentation with which in his numerous works he has vindicated and developed an idealistic philosophy of life." He is the second German to be awarded the prize and the first philosopher to be a recipient.

== Laureate ==
Rudolf Eucken centered his philosophy on the human experience. He maintained that man is the meeting place of nature and spirit and that it is man's duty to overcome his nonspiritual nature by actively striving after the spiritual life. Some of his major works are Die Einheit des Geisteslebens ("The Unity of the Spiritual Life", 1888), Geistige Strömungen der Gegenwart ("Main Currents of Modern Thoughts", 1908), Der Sinn und Wert des Lebens ("The Meaning and Value of Life", 1908), Können wir noch Christen sein? ("Can We Still Be Christians?", 1911), and Der Sozialismus und seine Lebensgestaltung ("Individual and Society", 1923).

== Deliberations ==
=== Nominations ===
Eucken had never been nominated for the prize before, making him one of the 10 laureates who won on a rare occasion when they have been awarded the Nobel Prize in Literature the same year they were first nominated. He received a single nomination from a member of the Swedish Academy.

In total, the academy received 23 nominations for 16 writers. Among the nominees include Jaroslav Vrchlický, Selma Lagerlöf (awarded in 1909), John Morley, Algernon Charles Swinburne, and Antonio Fogazzaro. Six of the nominees were newly nominated such as the controversial Elisabeth Förster-Nietzsche, Adolf von Harnack, Julio Calcaño and Edmondo De Amicis. The American writer Mark Twain was purportedly nominated in 1907 and 1908, but is not included in the archives.

The authors Vicente Acosta, Anton Giulio Barrili, Wilhelm Busch, Julia Abigail Cartney, Karl Josef Rudolph Cornely, Manuel Curros Enríquez, Joaquim Machado de Assis, Alexander Ertel, Carl Ewald, Louis-Honoré Fréchette, Joel Chandler Harris, Ludovic Halévy, Bronson Howard, Jonas Lie, Aurora Ljungstedt, Jadwiga Łuszczewska, Otto Pfleiderer, Anthony Winkler Prins, Maria Louise Ramé (known as Ouida), Evgeny Salias De Tournemire, Victorien Sardou, Susan Marr Spalding, Edmund Clarence Stedman, and Aleksey Zhemchuzhnikov died in 1908 without having been nominated for the prize. Italian novelist Edmondo de Amicis died months before the announcement.

Official list of nominees and their nominators for the prize
No.	Nominee	Country	Genre(s)	Nominator(s)
1	Julio Calcaño (Note: Calcaño: Tres poetas pesimistas del siglo XIX ("Three Pessimistic Nineteenth Century Poets", 1907)) (1840–1918)	Venezuela	poetry, literary criticism, novel	José María Manrique (1846–1907)
2	Edmondo de Amicis (1846–1908)	Italy	novel, short story, poetry	Arturo Graf (1848–1913); Francesco D'Ovidio (1849–1925)
3	Rudolf Christoph Eucken (1846–1926)	Germany	philosophy	Vitalis Norström (1856–1916)
4	Antonio Fogazzaro (1842–1911)	Italy	novel, poetry, short story	Carl David af Wirsén (1842–1912); Hans Hildebrand (1842–1913); Pehr von Ehrenheim (1823–1918); Harald Hjärne (1848–1922)
5	Elisabeth Förster-Nietzsche (1846–1935)	Germany	essays, autobiography	Hans Vaihinger (1852–1933)
6	Ángel Guimerá Jorge (1845–1924)	Spain	drama, poetry	17 members of the Reial Acadèmia de Bones Lletres de Barcelona and a professor from the University of Barcelona
7	Alfred Hutchinson (Note: Hutchinson: The Limit of Wealth (1907)) (1859–1930)	United States	law, essays	Luther Lamphere Wright (1856–1922)
8	Selma Lagerlöf (1858–1940)	Sweden	novel, short story	Karl Johan Warburg (1852–1918); Carl Gustaf Estlander (1834–1910); Johan Vising (1855–1942); Fredrik Wulff (1845–1930); Gottfrid Billing (1841–1925); Waldemar Rudin (1833–1921); Claes Annerstedt (1839–1927); Adolf Noreen (1854–1925)
9	John Morley (1838–1923)	Great Britain	biography, literary criticism, essays	12 members of The Incorporated Society of Authors
10	George Lansing Raymond (1839–1929)	United States	essays, philosophy	Charles Needham (1848–1935)
11	Georgios Souris (Note: Souris: Conseiller pour l'instruction publique La Canée, île de Crète ("National Education Advisers in Canée, the Island of Crete")) (1853–1919)	Greece	poetry, songwriting	name ineligible
12	Algernon Charles Swinburne (1837–1909)	Great Britain	poetry, drama, literary criticism, novel	25 members of The Incorporated Society of Authors
13	Adolf von Harnack (1851–1930)	Germany	history, theology	Lars Dahle (1843–1925)
14	Jaroslav Vrchlický (1853–1912)	Austria-Hungary (Czechoslovakia)	poetry, drama, translation	Arnošt Kraus (1859–1943)
15	Joseph Viktor Widmann (1842–1911)	Switzerland	novel, short story, drama, literary criticism	19 members of the Austrian Academy of Sciences
16	Theodor Zahn (1838–1933)	Germany	theology, essays	Lars Dahle (1843–1925)

=== Prize decision ===
For the 1908 prize, the main candidates were English poet Algernon Swinburne and the Swedish writer Selma Lagerlöf. Nobel Committee chair Carl David af Wirsén was against Lagerlöf for her radical styles and campaigned for Swinburne. Being divided between Swinburne and Lagerlöf, the committee, as a compromise choice, launched the German philosopher Rudolf Eucken as an alternative candidate that could be agreed upon and a representative of the Academy's interpretation of Nobel's ideal direction.

== Reactions ==
The choice of philosopher Rudolf Christoph Eucken as Nobel laureate in 1908 is widely considered to be one of the worst mistakes in the history of the Nobel Prize in Literature. The Swedish Academy's handling of the prize decision was heavily criticized at the time. Burton Feldman, author of The Nobel Prize: A History of Geniuses Controversy, and Prestige describes Eucken as a laureate "so forgotten that even philosophers are usually surprised he was a philosopher." While journalist Stuart Reid of The Atlantic describes him as "a deservedly forgotten philosopher who was never important."

== Nobel lecture ==
Eucken delivered a Nobel lecture entitled Naturalism or Idealism? on 27 March 1909 at Stockholm.
