= 1941 Nobel Prize in Literature =

- First award: 1901
- Website: Official website

The 1941 Nobel Prize in Literature was not awarded due to the ongoing Second World War that started on September 1, 1939. Instead, the prize money was allocated with 1/3 to the Main Fund and with 2/3 to the Special Fund of this prize section. This was the fifth occasion in Nobel history that the prize was not conferred.

== Nominations ==
Despite no author(s) being awarded the 1940 prize due to the ongoing Second World War, a number of literary critics, societies and academics continued sending nominations to the Nobel Committee of the Swedish Academy, hoping that their nominated candidate may be considered for the prize. In total, the academy received 21 nominations for 15 writers.

Three of the nominees were nominated first-time namely Manoel Wanderley, Ruth Comfort Young, and Branislav Petronijević. The highest number of the nominations – three nominations – was for the Danish author Johannes Vilhelm Jensen, who was awarded in 1944. Four of the nominees were women namely Gabriela Mistral (awarded in 1945), Henriette Charasson, Maria Madalena de Martel Patrício, and Ruth Comfort Young.

The authors Alexander Afinogenov, Sherwood Anderson, Oskar Baum, Mihály Babits, Tadeusz Boy-Żeleński, Karin Boye, Robert Byron, José de la Cuadra, Penelope Delta, William Arthur Dunkerley, James Joyce, Émile Nelligan, Banjo Paterson, Elizabeth Madox Roberts, Norberto Romualdez, Hasegawa Shigure, Gertrude Eileen Trevelyan, Marina Tsvetaeva, Evelyn Underhill, Elizabeth von Arnim, Benjamin Lee Whorf, Virginia Woolf, and May Ziadeh died in 1941 without having been nominated for the prize.

Official list of nominees and their nominators for the prize
No.	Nominee	Country	Genre(s)	Nominator(s)
1	René Béhaine (1880–1966)	France	novel, short story, essays	François Dumas (1861–1948)
2	Edmund Blunden (1896–1974)	United Kingdom	poetry, essays, biography	Heinrich Wolfgang Donner (1904–1980)
3	Henriette Charasson (1884–1972)	France	poetry, essays, drama, novel, literary criticism, biography	Jacques Chevalier (1882–1962)
4	Paul Claudel (1868–1955)	France	poetry, drama, essays, memoir	Peter Hjalmar Rokseth (1891–1945)
5	Maria Madalena de Martel Patrício (1884–1947)	Portugal	poetry, essays	António Baião (1878–1961)
6	Vilhelm Ekelund (1880–1949)	Sweden	poetry, essays	Hans Larsson (1862–1944); Pär Lagerkvist (1891–1974)
7	Johan Falkberget (1879–1967)	Norway	novel, short story, essays	Richard Beck (1897–1980)
8	Vilhelm Grønbech (1873–1948)	Denmark	history, essays, poetry	Sven Lönborg (1871–1959)
9	Johan Huizinga (1872–1945)	Netherlands	history	Hjalmar Hammarskjöld (1862–1953); Willem van Eysinga (1878–1961)
10	Johannes Vilhelm Jensen (1873–1950)	Denmark	novel, short story, essays	Vilhelm Cederschiöld (1882–1959); Frederik Poulsen (1876–1950); Carl Adolf Bodelsen (1894–1978)
11	Gabriela Mistral (1889–1957)	Chile	poetry	Hjalmar Hammarskjöld (1862–1953)
12	Branislav Petronijević (1875–1954)	Serbia	philosophy	Vladeta Popović (1894–1951); Marko Car (1859–1953)
13	Felix Timmermans (1886–1947)	Belgium	novel, short story, drama, poetry, essays	Hjalmar Hammarskjöld (1862–1953)
14	Manoel Cyrillo Wanderley (–)	Brazil	poetry, essays	Francisco de Aquino Correa (1885–1956)
15	Ruth Comfort Young (1882–1954)	United States	drama, screenplay, novel, short story, poetry	Benjamin Biesel (1890–1979); Victor Bennett (–)

== Prize decision ==
In their deliberations on the nominated candidates for the 1941 Nobel Prize in Literature, the Nobel committee considered Chilean poet Gabriela Mistral, Danish author Johannes V. Jensen, Dutch historian Johan Huizinga and Flemish Felix Timmermans, but none of them received a majority of support. Committee member Hjalmar Hammarskjöld proposed that the 1941 Nobel Prize in Literature should be awarded to Gabriela Mistral, but no prize was awarded that year. Subsequently, Johannes V. Jensen was awarded the 1944 Nobel Prize in Literature and Gabriela Mistral awarded the 1945 Nobel Prize in Literature.
