= William J. Neidig =

American professor, poet, and author

William Jonathan Neidig (1870–1955) was a professor, poet, and writer in the United States. Born in Iowa, he taught at Stanford and the University of Wisconsin, and became a freelance writer. His 1919 book The Fire Flingers was adapted to film. In 1906, University of Wisconsin professor Henry Lathrop nominated him for the Nobel Prize in literature for his book of poems titled The First Wardens.

In 1900 he reviewed a collection of stories by Charles W. Chestnut. He wrote about Shakespeare's work and what is known as the False Folio. In September 1923, one of his stories was published in The Saturday Evening Post. He wrote poetry.

== Works ==
- The First Wardens, poems, Stanford University Press (1901)
- False dates on Shakspere quartos; a new method of proof applied to a controversy of scholars (1910)
- The Fire Flingers (1919)
- The Chrysalis
