= 1933 Nobel Prize in Literature =

- Ivan Bunin
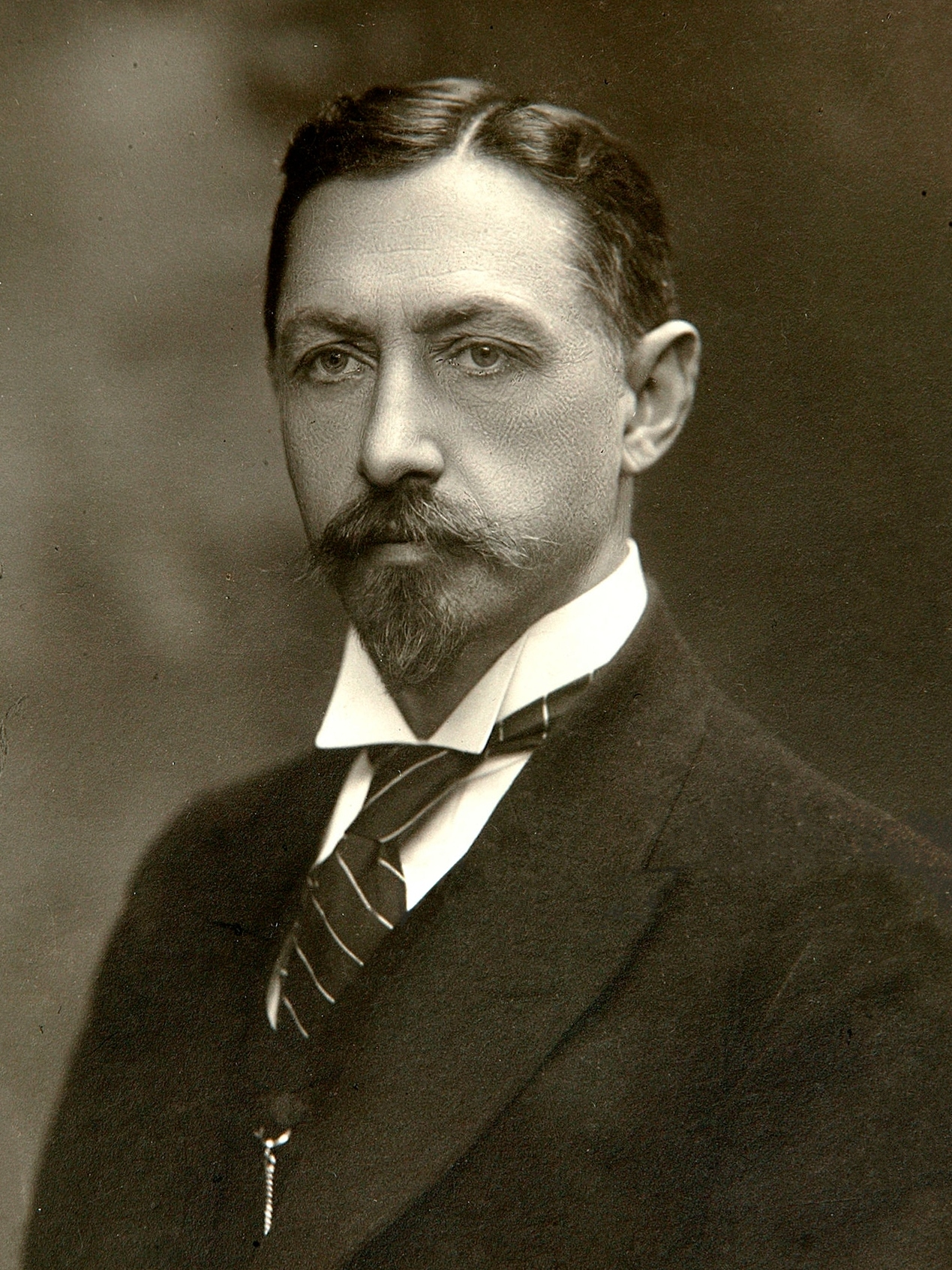
- "for the strict artistry with which he has carried on the classical Russian traditions in prose writing."
- Date: 9 November 1933 (announcement); 10 December 1933 (ceremony)
- Location: Stockholm, Sweden
- Presented by: Swedish Academy
- First award: 1901
- Website: Official website

The 1933 Nobel Prize in Literature was awarded to Ivan Bunin (1870–1953) "for the strict artistry with which he has carried on the classical Russian traditions in prose writing". Bunin was the first Russian author to be awarded the Nobel Prize in Literature.

== Laureate ==
Ivan Bunin was a poet and prose writer, best known for his short stories and novellas such as The Gentleman from San Francisco (1916) and Mitya's Love (1924). Bunin is regarded as one of the best stylists in the Russian language.

== Nominations ==
Ivan Bunin was nominated for the prize 18 times starting in 1923, when he was nominated by the 1915 Nobel laureate Romain Rolland. In 1933 five nominations were submitted for Bunin. In total the Nobel committee received 47 nominations for 29 individuals including Frans Eemil Sillanpää (awarded in 1939), Johannes V. Jensen (awarded in 1944), Paul Valéry, Karel Capek, Coelho Neto, Olav Duun and Upton Sinclair.

== Prize decision ==
The decision to award Ivan Bunin the 1933 Nobel Prize in Literature was preceded by a long campaign. Starting in 1923, the Armenia-born Mihaïl Handamirov, a lecturer in the Russian language and literature at Lund University, particularly pushed for a prize to Bunin. Handamirov hired the accomplished translators Sigurd Agrell and Ruth Wedin Rothstein to introduce Bunin's work in Swedish and made sure that Agrell, in his capacity as professor, continuously and eloquently nominated Bunin for the prize. Gradually, positive opinions about Bunin's worthiness to receive the Nobel Prize in Literature accumulated in the relevant Swedish literary circles, and in 1933 the Swedish Academy decided to award him the prize.

During the deliberations for the 1933 prize, the Nobel committee failed to agree on one candidate. Three members of the committee, Hjalmar Hammarskjöld, Henrik Schück and committee chairman Per Hallström, advocated a prize to the Portuguese poet António Correia de Oliveira while Anders Österling proposed Ivan Bunin. Hammarskjöld and Hallström supported Bunin's candidacy but emphasized that Correia de Oliveira should have precedence for the prize. Committee member Fredrik Böök, who opposed both Bunin's and Correia de Oliveira's candidacies, proposed German writer Paul Ernst. Ernst died during the deliberations in 1933, but Böök stuck to his proposal and stressed that awarding a posthumous prize was not an obstacle according to the statutes, as had happened in 1931.

On 9 November 1933 the Swedish Academy decided that the Nobel Prize should be awarded to Ivan Bunin "for the strict artistry with which he has carried on the classical Russian traditions in prose writing."

== Award ceremony ==
At the award ceremony in Stockholm on 10 December 1933, Per Hallström, permanent secretary of the Swedish Academy, said:

In the literary history of his country, the place of Ivan Bunin has been clearly defined and his importance recognized for a long time and almost without divergence of opinions. He has followed the great tradition of the brilliant era of the nineteenth century in stressing the line of development which can be continued. He perfected concentration and richness of expression – of a description of real life based on an almost unique precision of observation. With the most rigorous art he has well resisted all temptations to forget things for the charm of words; although by nature a lyric poet, he has never embellished what he has seen but has rendered it with the most exact fidelity. To his simple language he has added a charm which, according to the testimonies of his compatriots, has made of it a precious drink that one can often sense even in the translations. This ability is his eminent and secret talent, and it gives the imprint of the masterpiece to his literary work.
