= Jules Payot =

French Educationist

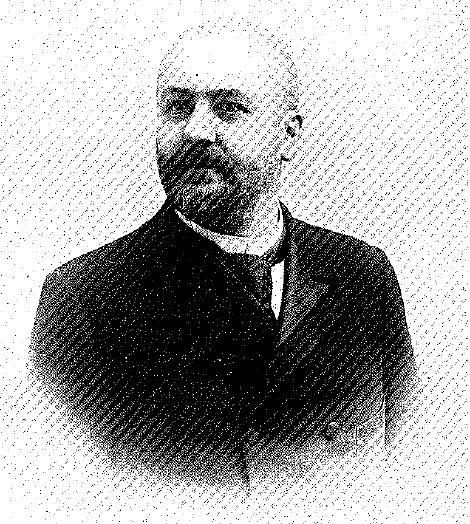
- Jules Payot
- Born: 10 April 1859; Chamonix, France
- Died: 30 January 1940 (aged 80)
- Scientific career
- Fields: Pedagogy, Philosophy

Jules Payot (English: /pɑːˈjoʊ/ pah-YOH, French: [ʒyl pajo]; 10 April 1859 – 30 January 1940) was a French educationist.

== Career overview ==
Payot was born in 1859 in Chamonix. Little is known about his education and academic career; however some sources presents him as a leading figure in lay education and in 1907 he was appointed rector at Aix-Marseille University. Payot died in 1940.

According to a summary of minutes taken by the secretary of the faculty at the Ecole Normale, Payot presented his candidacy to the vacant chair in Pedagogy previously held by Professor Ferdinand Buisson. The chair eventually was granted to Émile Durkheim, who was noted as being mainly a sociologist, but the electing council argued that pedagogy was a subject within sociology. Payot received ten votes in the first poll, thereby losing to Malapert, who in turn lost to Durkheim.

Among his most famous books are Éducation de la volonté which in 1909 had been published in no less than 32 editions and subsequently translated into several languages.

== Quotes ==
"Une foule n’est accessible qu’à des émotions, elle est incapable d’une attitude d’esprit objective." — A crowd is accessible only to emotions, it is unable of an objective attitude of spirit.
From La Conquête du Bonheur/The Conquest of Happiness

"La plupart attrapent une opinion comme on attrape la rougeole, par contagion." — The majority catch an opinion as one catches measles, by contagion.
From La Faillite de l’Enseignement/The Bankruptcy of Teaching

== Bibliography ==
- (1894). Éducation de la Volonté.
- (1908). La Morale à l'École.
- (1914). L'Apprentissage de l'Art d'Écrire.
- (1921). Le Travail Intellectuel et la Volonté: Suite à "L'Éducation de la Volonté".
- (1921). La Conquête du Bonheur.
- (1937). La Faillite de l'Enseignement.

Works in English translation

- (1909). Education of the Will, Funk & Wagnalls Company.
- (1919). "Military Service and Self-Control." In French Educational Ideals of Today, World Book Company.
- (1921). Will-power and Work, Funk & Wagnalls Company.
- (1924). The Conquest of Happiness, Funk & Wagnalls Company.
