= Karl Josef Rudolph Cornely =

German Jesuit biblical scholar

Karl Josef Rudolph Cornely (19 April 1830, at Breyell in Germany – 3 March 1908, at Treves), was a German Jesuit biblical scholar.

== Life ==
=== Formation ===
On the completion of his classical studies he matriculated at Münster in Westphalia to study philosophy and theology. In 1852 he joined the Society of Jesus. Recognizing his abilities, his superiors determined to give him the best possible training both practical and theoretical. Consequently, his novitiate finished, he took a two years' course of scholastic philosophy at Paderborn and Bonn and another year of sacred and secular oratory. Then he was sent to Feldkirch to teach Latin, Greek, and German, and to preside at the disputations of the students of philosophy from 1857 to 1859. After this practical experience he returned to Paderborn to go through the necessary course of dogmatic and moral theology previous to his ordination in 1860.

The next years he devoted to special study of the Scriptural sciences in Germany, at Ghazir near Beirut, in Egypt and in Paris, and by dint of hard labour acquired an extensive knowledge of Syriac, Arabic, Samaritan, and Aramaic. After five years thus spent in special work he was recalled to Maria-Laach, the theologate of the Jesuits, to review his varied acquirements in the light of dogmatic theology and to prepare his theses for the final examination and the degree of Doctor in Scripture. After the customary third year spent in making the exercises of St. Ignatius and other spiritual practices, he was appointed professor of scripture and Semitic languages at Maria-Laach.

=== Editor of Stimmen aus Maria-Laach ===
When the Jesuits founded the periodical Stimmen aus Maria-Laach, Cornely became at first a regular contributor and then its editor from 1872 to 1879. His style is remarkable for clearness and vigor and compares favorably with the great German classics. The ring in indignation and irony in his articles against the Old Catholics, on the Protestant Association, and on political hypocrisy finds its explanation in the attacks on and in the persecution of the Catholic church and of the order to which he belonged.

The expulsion of the Jesuits from Germany in 1872 interrupted his career as a professor and rendered the task of the editor extremely difficult. With three or four of his brethren he took up his residence at Tervuren near Brussels, and although many of his collaborators and the rich library of Maria-Laach were scattered about in different places, he succeeded not only in maintaining the periodical on its former level but also strengthening and widening its influence on Catholic Germany. Most of the men who contributed from that time on to the Stimmen were won and trained by the personality of Cornely, who frequently inspired and always carefully revised the papers, thus securing uniformity of tone and tendency. An important stage in the development of the Stimmen was marked by the appearance of the first supplements (Ergänzungshefte), in 1876. This new departure was occasioned by the numerous philosophic writings of Tilman Pesch. They could not all be published in the Stimmen without altering the general character of the periodical. The supplements embody varied scholarship: theology, philosophy, literature, and science.

=== New journal on the 'German missions' ===
Cornely founded in 1873 Die katholischen Missionen. Intended for German readers, this magazine was to describe the labours and successes of the German missionary and to give the history, the geography, and the ethnographic features of the German missions in foreign countries. In the beginning Cornely took the lion's share of work upon himself. Soon, however, the labour was thus divided: Cornely wrote the reports on Europe and Australia; Baumgartner reported on Asia; Kreiten on Africa; and von Hummelauer on America.

=== Professor in Rome ===
In 1879, Cornely was appointed professor of exegesis at the Gregorian university in Rome. Here he planned and wrote the first volumes of the Cursus Scripturæ Sacræ, a complete biblical encyclopedia, the largest publication of its kind in modern Catholic literature. To carry out a plan so vast required the combined efforts of many scholars. Cornely himself undertook to write the general and special introductions and the commentaries on the Epistles of St. Paul. Even this task he could not complete, although he discontinued lecturing in 1889 to devote all his energies to the greatest work of his laborious life.

== Works ==
Among his writings are:

- Introductio generalis in U. T. libros sacros (Paris, 1893)
- Introductio specialis in historicos V. T. libros (Paris, 1897)
- Introductio specialis in didacticos et propheticos V. T. libros (Paris, 1897)
- Introductio specialis in singulos N. T. libros (Paris, 1897)
- Historicæ et criticæ Introductionis in U. T. libros Compendium (Paris, 1900)
- Synopses omnium librorum sacrorum (Paris, 1899)
- Psalmorum synopses (Paris, 1899)
- Analyses librorum sacrorum N. T. (Paris, 1888)
- Commentarium in priorem ep. ad Corinthios (Paris, 1890)
- Commentarius in epistolas ad Cor. alterum et ad Galatas (Paris, 1892)
- Commentarius in ep. ad Romanos (Paris, 1896)
- Leben des sel. Petrus Faber (Freiburg, 1900)
- Leben des sel. Spinola (Mainz, 1868)
