= Theodor Zahn =

German theologian and biblical scholar (1838–1933)

Theodor von Zahn
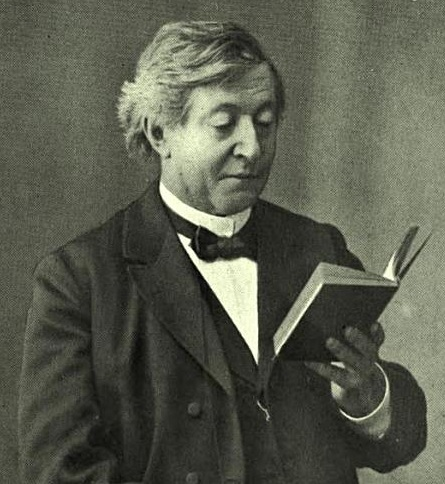
- Theodor von Zahn, c. 1908.
- Born: October 10, 1838; Moers, Prussia (present-day Germany)
- Died: March 5, 1933 (aged 94); Erlangen, Germany
- Occupations: Theologian; New Testament scholar

Theodor Zahn or Theodor von Zahn (10 October 1838 in Moers – 5 March 1933 in Erlangen) was a German Protestant theologian and biblical scholar. He was nominated for the Nobel Prize in Literature three times.

== Career ==
Zahn was born in Moers of the Rhineland, Prussia (now Germany). After studying at Basel, Erlangen and Berlin, he became professor of theology in the University of Göttingen in 1871. He filled a similar chair at Kiel in 1877, at Erlangen in 1878, at Leipzig in 1888 and in 1892 returned to Erlangen. He was distinguished for his eminent scholarship, especially in connection with the New Testament canon. He stood at the head of the conservative New Testament scholarship of his time. He was nominated for the Nobel Prize in Literature in 1902, 1904 and 1908. Theologically, Zahn was conservative and approached New Testament theology from the perspective of a theological emphasis called Heilsgeschichte (usually translated into English as "Salvation History").

== Works ==
Some of his more important writings are:

- Marcellus of Ancyra (1867)
- Der Hirt des Hermas untersucht ("The Shepherd of Hermas examined", 1868)
- Ignatius von Antiochien (1873)
- Patrum Apostolicorum Opera (1875–78; fifth edition, 1905)
- The Acts of Saint John (1880)
- Forschungen zur Geschichte des neutestamentlichen Kanons und der altkirchlichen Litteratur (eight volumes, 1881–1908)
- Cyprian of Antioch and the German Story of Faust (1882)
- Geschichte des neutestamentlichen Kanons ("Researches into the history of the New Testament canon", two volumes, 1889–92)
- Das apostolische Symbolum (1892; English translation, The Apostles' Creed, 1899)
- The Gospel of Peter (1893)
- Einleitung in das neue Testament (two volumes, 1897–1900; third edition, 1906–07; English translation, Introduction to the New Testament, three volumes, 1909)
- Brot und Salz aus Gottes Wort, 20 sermons, (1901; English translation, Bread and Salt from the Word of God, 1905)
- Grundriss der Geschichte des neutestamentlichen Kanons ("Outline of the history of the New Testament canon", 1901; second edition, 1904)
- Das Evangelium des Lucas (1912)
