= António Mendes Correia =

Portuguese anthropologist, physician and scientist

António Mendes Correia (1888 - 1960) was a Portuguese anthropologist, physician and scientist. He is known for his "Australian theory" that argues about Australian natives migrating to America by sea through the Antarctic, explaining the human settlements found in Tierra del Fuego part of the Argentine Patagonia and the southernmost island closer to the continent, which also explain other settlement around south America that support a pre-clovis theory.

His theory is based on the assumption that there was a current of migration to South America from Australia and Tasmania, crossing the Auckland Islands to Antarctica (during the so-called optimus climaticum), settling in Tierra del Fuego and Patagonia. His theory was supported by physical similarities in skulls and blood groups, linguistic and cultural similarities.

Correia was fiercely dedicated to the nationalistic and imperialistic interests of what he considered the "Portuguese race". His writings on archaeology, social "hygiene", eugenics, education, and criminology served his patriotic goals. To these ends he also envisioned institutionalizing a discipline of "colonial anthropology". He began this project by addressing the question: to which race did the natives of the island of Timor belong? He was interested to categorize them in a single race.
