= António Correia de Oliveira =

Portuguese poet

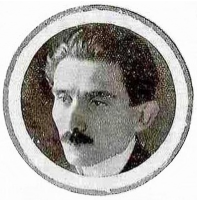
- Born: 30 July 1878
- Died: 20 February 1960 (aged 81)
- Occupation: Poet

António Correia de Oliveira (1879–1960) was a Portuguese poet. According to the Nomination Database for the Nobel Prize in Literature he was nominated 15 times for the Nobel Prize in Literature without being awarded, though he came close for the 1933 award.

== Life ==
António Correia de Oliveira was born in São Pedro do Sul, in the district of Viseu, in 1879.

He studied at the Seminary of Viseu, then went to Lisbon, where he worked briefly as a journalist at the Illustrated Diary. He published his first work at the age of 16, Ladainha in 1897. He was a companion of Raul Brandão and was influenced by Antero de Quental and Guerra Junqueiro. In 1912, having married, he settled in the parish of Antas, municipality of Esposende, going to live for the Quinta do Belinho.

He was a poet, was one of the singers of Saudosismo, along with Teixeira de Pascoaes and others. He was connected to the cultural movements of Lusitanian Integralism and the magazines.

He was decidedly monarchical, he became one of the unofficial poets of the Estado Novo, with numerous texts chosen for the unique Portuguese-language books of the primary and secondary education system.

Correia de Oliveira was nominated for the Nobel Prize for Literature for the first time in 1933, having been nominated a total of fifteen times in nine years (1933 to 1940 and 1942). The same winner of 1945, the Chilean Gabriela Mistral, who had served as Cultural Attaché in Lisbon, publicly stated in the solemn act that she did not deserve the prize, with the author of Verbo Ser e Verbo Amar being present.

He was the third Portuguese to be nominated for Nobel Of Literature, after João da Câmara in 1901 and João Bonança in 1907, but he is the Portuguese who is known for the greatest number of nominations, along with Maria Madalena de Martel Patrício who has fourteen.

António Correia de Oliveira died in the parish of Antas, Esposende, in the district of Braga, in 1960.

== Family ==
He was the father of José Gonçalo Correia de Oliveira (1921-1976), Minister of Economy between 1965 and 1968.

== Works ==
- Ladainha (1897, Lisboa, Typ. do Commercio)
- Eiradas (1899, Lisboa, Antiga Casa Bertrand - José Bastos)
- Cantigas (1902, Lisboa, Livr. Ferin)
- Raiz (1903, Coimbra, França Amado)
- Ara (1904, Lisboa, Livraria Ferreira)
- Parábolas (1905, Lisboa, Ferreira de Oliveira)
- Tentações de San Frei Gil (1907, Lisboa, Ferreira & Oliveira)
- O Pinheiro Exilado (1907, Lisboa, Livraria Ferreira; Typ. do Annuario Commercial)
- Elogio dos Sentidos (1908, Porto, Magalhães & Moniz)
- Alma Religiosa (1910, Porto, Magalhães & Moniz)
- Dizeres do Povo (1911, Esposende, Typ. de José da Silva Vieira)
- Auto das Quatro Estações (1911, Lisboa, Cernadas)
- Romarias (1912, Porto)
- Vida e História da Árvore (1913, Belinho)
- A Criação (1913, Viana, Typ. Modelo)
- Menino (1914, Paris; Lisboa, Aillaud e Bertrand)
- Os teus Sonetos (1914, Lisboa, Livr. Aillaud e Bertrand)
- A Minha Terra (1915-1917, 10 volumes)
- A Alma das Árvores (1918, Rio de Janeiro; Paris; Lisboa, Francisco Alves, Aillaud e Bertrand)
- Estas Mal Notadas Regras (1918)
- Pão nosso. Alegre vinho. Azeite da candeia. (1920, Lisboa, Portugalia Editora)
- Na Hora Incerta (1920-1922, Porto, Tip. Costa Carregal)
  - 1.º livro: É Portugal que vos Fala (1920)
  - 2.º livro: Viriato Lusitano (1920)
  - 3.º livro: Auto do Berço (1920)
  - 4.º livro: O Santo Condestável (1921)
  - 5.º livro: A Fala que Deus nos Deu (1921)
  - 6.º livro: A Nau Catrineta (1922)
  - 7.º livro: A Terra do Paraíso (1922)
- Verbo Ser e Verbo Amar (1926, Lisboa, Livr. Aillaud & Bertrand)
- Os Livros do Cativeiro (1927)
- Teresinha (1929, Porto, Imprensa Moderna)
- Job (1931, Barcelos, Comp. Editora do Minho)
- Mare Nostrum (1939, Porto, Acção Social da Legião Portuguesa)
- História Pequenina de Portugal Gigante (1940, Barcelos, Companhia Editora do Minho)
- Aljubarrota ao Luar (1944)
- Saudade Nossa (1944, Lisboa, Neogravura)
- Redondilhas (1948, Porto, Liv. Figueirinhas)
- Deus-Menino para o lar da criança portuguesa (1953)
- Pátria (1953, Porto, Liv. Tavares Martins)
- Azinheira em Flor (1954)
- Natal Deus-Menino (1960, Porto)
