= Sigfrid Siwertz =

Swedish writer

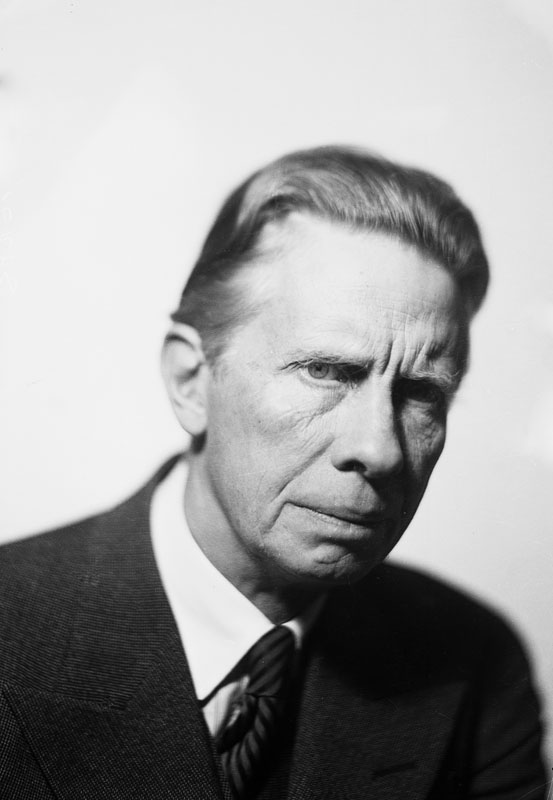
- Notable works: Mälarpirater

Sigfrid Siwertz (24 January 1882 – 26 November 1970) was a Swedish novelist and poet. He was born and died in Stockholm.

A prolific writer, he wrote poetry, several plays and many short stories, but is best known for his novels. His early novel Mälarpirater (1911, "Pirates of Mälaren"), a story about three boys' adventures on a stolen sailing boat in Mälaren, is regarded as a minor classic in Swedish literature and was for long widely read in Swedish schools. His masterpiece, however, is the novel Selambs, published in two parts in 1920. Acknowledged as one of the best critical depictions of the bourgeoisie in Swedish literature, it was adapted to a television series in 1979.

In 1932, Siwertz was elected a member of the Swedish Academy, and remained in that position until his death in 1970. He was a member of the Nobel Prize committee from 1942 to 1963.
