= Henriette Charasson =

French Catholic author

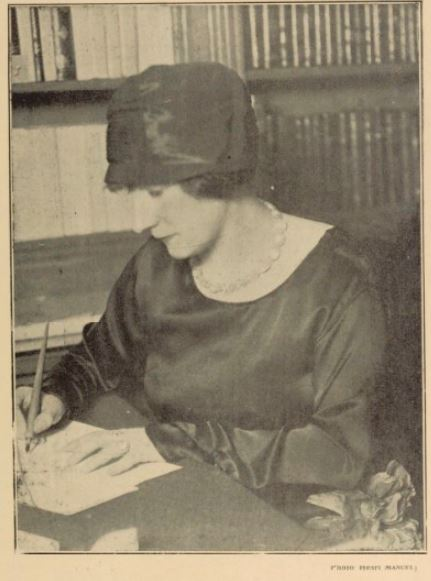
- Born: 6 January 1884; Le Havre, Seine-Maritime, France
- Died: 24 December 1972 (aged 88); Châteauroux, Indre, France
- Other name: Orion
- Spouse: René Johannet

Henriette Charasson (6 January 1884 – 24 December 1972) was a French author of Catholic themes who was nominated multiple times for the Nobel Prize in Literature.

== Biography ==
Charasson was born on 6 January 1884 in Le Havre, France.

During World War I, Charasson joined the Action Française. She wrote for La Croix and L'Action Française on several occasions under the pseudonym Orion, which increased her notoriety in intellectual and masculine nationalist circles. She later became a contributor for La Dépêche tunisienne as a literary critic for twenty-five years.

Upon reading the works of Charles Maurras, Charasson expressed that her belief in God was awakened. She said: "For me, I repeat, encountering the works of Charles Maurras, who is not a believer, was my first step on the road to Damascus." Her marriage in 1920 to the journalist René Johannet led to her eventual conversion to Catholicism. After the condemnation of Action Française by the Pope Pius XI in 1926, Charasson turned away from the movement.

She died on 24 December 1972 on Châteauroux, France.

== Publications ==
=== Novel ===
- Grigri (1922)

=== Poetry ===
- Attente: 1914-1917 (1919)
- Les Heures du foyer (1926)
- Mon Seigneur et mon Dieu! (1934)
- Sur la plus haute branche (1938)
- Attente de la délivrance: 1939-1944 (1945)
- Le Sacrifice du soir: 1947-1953 (1953)

=== Drama ===
- Le Saut du diable (1931)
- En chemin de fer (1933)
- Une robe de soie (1934)
- Madame est sans bonne (1934)
- Les Réalités invisibles (1934)
- Séparation (1934)
- Bal masqué (1936)
- Ruptures (1938)
- Autour d'un berceau (1939)
- Dix comédies à une voix (1949)

=== Biography ===
- Jules Tellier: 1863-1889 (1922)
- Une Âme élue: sœur Claire de Jésus, religieuse bénédictine (octobre 1894-mars 1923) (1931)

=== Essays ===
- Faut-il supprimer le gynécée? (1924)
- M. de Porto-Riche ou le Racine juif (1925)
- Deux petits hommes et leur mère (1928)
- La Mère (1931)
- L'Amour et quelques couples (1946)
- Le Livre de mon enfant (1947)
- Une mère se souvient (1953)

== Awards ==
Charasson's honors are from the Académie Française:

- Prix Montyon in 1921
- Prix Fabien in 1925
- Prix d'Académie in 1929, 1935 and 1942
- Prix Paul-Hervieu in 1933
- Prix d'Aumale in 1939
- Prix Alice-Louis Barthou in 1947
- Prix Véga et Lods de Wegmann in 1955 and 1960
- Prix Broquette-Gonin in 1963
- Prix Valentine de Wolmar in 1969

== Honors and Awards ==
Officer of the Order of Legion of Honour
