= Maria Madalena de Martel Patrício =

Portuguese writer

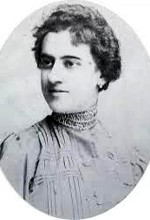
- Born: 19 April 1884; Lisbon, Kingdom of Portugal
- Died: 3 November 1947 (aged 63); Lisbon, Portugal
- Occupations: novelist, poet

Maria Madalena Valdez Trigueiros de Martel Patrício (19 April 1884 – 3 November 1947) was a Portuguese novelist and poet. She became the first Portuguese woman nominated for the Nobel Prize in Literature, despite being now a largely forgotten writer in her home country.

== Biography ==
Maria Madalena de Martel Patrício was born in Lisbon on 19 April 1884, into an aristocratic family with roots in Pombal.

She married Francisco Ribas Patrício (1869-1960), judge and judge at the Lisbon Court of Appeal.

She died on 3 November 1947.

=== Literary works ===
Maria Madalena de Martel Patricio published around 25 books of fiction, poetry and essays, including several autobiographical books about her childhood such as Quando eu era pequenina and one book of poems written in French, Le livre du passé mort. Her writing has been compared to the works of the contemporary authors François Mauriac and Selma Lagerlöf.

=== Nobel Prize in Literature ===
Maria Magdalena became the first Portuguese woman to be nominated for the Nobel Prize for Literature for the first time in 1934 by Bento Carqueja, a member of the Lisbon Academy of Sciences. She also became the second most nominated Portuguese, having been nominated a total of 14 times over the 15 years (1934, 1935 and from 1937 to 1947) after the poet António Correia de Oliveira.

== Selected works ==
- O Livro do Passado Morto ("The Book of the Dead Past", 1915; republished in 1935)
- Impressões de Arte e de Tristeza ("Impressions of Art and Sadness", 1915)
- Sombras na Estrada ("Shadows on the Road", 1920)
- Poemas da Côr e do Silêncio ("Poems of Color and Silence", 1922)
- Os Sete Demónios ("The Seven Demons", 1926)
- Princesses du Portugal: souveraines de Flandres, 1430-1930 ("Princesses du Portugal: Souvenirs of Flanders, 1430-1930", 1930)
- Sagradas pedras ("Sacred Stones", 1930)
- O Espírito das Eras ("The Spirit of the Ages", 1931)
- Quando Eu Era Pequenina... ("When I Was Little...", 1935)
- Rosário da Vida ("Rosary of Life", 1935)
- O Espírito Medieval ("The Medieval Spirit", 1937)
- A nossa Amiga Lisboa ("Our Friend Lisbon", 1944)
