= List of Greek Nobel laureates and nominees =

As of 2026, there have been 7 Greek Nobel Laureates, 4 of which won the Nobel Prize for Literature, 1 of which won the Nobel Prize for Physiology or Medicine, 1 of which won the Nobel Prize for Economics and 1 of which won the Nobel Prize for Chemistry.

== Greek Nobel Laureates ==
=== Laureates from Greece ===
Year	Image	Laureate	Born	Died	Field	Citation
Citizens
1963		Giorgos [Seferiadis] Seferis	13 May 1900 in Urla, İzmir, Ottoman Empire	20 September 1971 in Athens, Greece	Literature	"for his eminent lyrical writing, inspired by a deep feeling for the Hellenic world of culture."
1979		Odysseas [Alepoudellis] Elytis	2 November 1911 in Heraklion, Crete, Greece	18 March 1996 in Athens, Greece	Literature	"for his poetry, which, against the background of Greek tradition, depicts with sensuous strength and intellectual clear-sightedness modern man's struggle for freedom and creativeness."

=== Laureates not from Greece, but of Greek descent ===
Year	Image	Laureate	Born	Died	Field	Citation
Citizens
1934		Luigi Pirandello	28 June 1867 in Agrigento, Sicily, Kingdom of Italy	10 December 1936 in Rome, Kingdom of Italy	Literature	"for his bold and ingenious revival of dramatic and scenic art"
1959		Salvatore Quasimodo	20 August 1901 in Modica, Sicily, Kingdom of Italy	14 June 1968 in Naples, Italy	Literature	"for his lyrical poetry, which with classical fire expresses the tragic experience of life in our own times"
1974		George Emil Palade	November 19, 1912 in Iași, Kingdom of Romania	October 8, 2008 in Del Mar, California, United States	Physiology or Medicine	"for their discoveries concerning the structural and functional organization of the cell" (prize shared with Albert Claude and Christian de Duve))
2010		Christopher A. Pissarides	20 February 1948 in Nicosia, British Cyprus		Economics	"for their analysis of markets with search frictions" (prize shared with Peter A. Diamond and Dale T. Mortensen)
2024		Demis Hassabis	27 July 1976 in London, United Kingdom		Chemistry	"for protein structure prediction" (prize shared with John M. Jumper and David Baker)

== Greek Nobel Nominees ==
Image	Nominee	Born	Died	Years Nominated	Citation	Nominator(s)
Physics
	Nicholas Christofilos	16 December 1916 in Boston, United States	24 September 1972 in Hayward, California, United States	1965, 1967, 1971		
Chemistry
	Leonidas Zervas	21 May 1902 in Megalopolis, Greece	10 July 1980 in Athens, Greece	1974	"For his works on the chemistry of proteins."	Nominated the only time by Paul Sakellaridis (b. 1920) from Athens
Literature
	Demetrios Bernardakis	3 December 1833 in Mytilene, Lesbos, Greece	12 January 1907 in Mytilene, Lesbos, Greece	1904, 1905		Athanasios Bernardakis (1844–1922); Greece
	Georgios Souris	2 February 1853 in Ermoupoli, Syros, Greece	26 August 1919 in Athens, Greece	1907		Nikolaos Levidis (1868–1942); Greece
	Georgios Souris	2 February 1853 in Ermoupoli, Syros, Greece	26 August 1919 in Athens, Greece	1907		9 members of the Greek Artists' Association
	Georgios Souris	2 February 1853 in Ermoupoli, Syros, Greece	26 August 1919 in Athens, Greece	1907, 1912		Georgios Hatzidakis (1848–1941); Greece
	Georgios Souris	2 February 1853 in Ermoupoli, Syros, Greece	26 August 1919 in Athens, Greece	1908		name ineligible
	Georgios Souris	2 February 1853 in Ermoupoli, Syros, Greece	26 August 1919 in Athens, Greece	1909		Pavlos Karolidis (1849–1930) Greece; Dimitrios Patsopoulos (1845–1920) Greece
	Georgios Souris	2 February 1853 in Ermoupoli, Syros, Greece	26 August 1919 in Athens, Greece	1909		members of the Parnassos Literary Society
	Georgios Souris	2 February 1853 in Ermoupoli, Syros, Greece	26 August 1919 in Athens, Greece	1911		Hellenic Philological Society of Constantinople (Note: The nomination was made by the president and secretary of the Hellenic Philological Society in Constantinople, Turkey.)
	Kostis Palamas	13 January 1859 in Patras, Greece	27 February 1943 in Athens, Greece	1926, 1927, 1930, 1931, 1932, 1933		Simos Menardos (1872–1933); Greece
	Kostis Palamas	13 January 1859 in Patras, Greece	27 February 1943 in Athens, Greece	1928, 1930, 1935		Verner von Heidenstam (1859–1940); Sweden
	Kostis Palamas	13 January 1859 in Patras, Greece	27 February 1943 in Athens, Greece	1930, 1934		Frederik Poulsen (1876–1950); Denmark
	Kostis Palamas	13 January 1859 in Patras, Greece	27 February 1943 in Athens, Greece	1931		10 members of the Academy of Athens (Note: Kostis Palamas was also nominated by professors of Modern Greek in Paris, France and Leiden, Netherlands.)
	Kostis Palamas	13 January 1859 in Patras, Greece	27 February 1943 in Athens, Greece	1934, 1936		Harry Fett (1875–1962); Norway
	Kostis Palamas	13 January 1859 in Patras, Greece	27 February 1943 in Athens, Greece	1935		Three professors (Note: Three professors of literature and/or history from the University of Athens, Greece.)
	Kostis Palamas	13 January 1859 in Patras, Greece	27 February 1943 in Athens, Greece	1936		Sofia Antoniadou (?); Greece
	Kostis Palamas	13 January 1859 in Patras, Greece	27 February 1943 in Athens, Greece	1937		Nikos Athanasiou Veēs (1882–1958); Greece
	Kostis Palamas	13 January 1859 in Patras, Greece	27 February 1943 in Athens, Greece	1938		3 members of the Athens Academy of Science
	Kostis Palamas	13 January 1859 in Patras, Greece	27 February 1943 in Athens, Greece	1940		Iōannēs Kalitsounakēs (1878–1966); Greece
	Yiorgos Theotokas	27 April 1906 in Istanbul, Turkey	30 October 1966 in Athens, Greece	1945		Sigfrid Siwertz (1882–1970); Sweden
	Angelos Sikelianos	28 March 1884 in Lefkada, Greece	19 June 1951 in Athens, Greece	1946		Anders Österling (1884–1981); Sweden
	Angelos Sikelianos	28 March 1884 in Lefkada, Greece	19 June 1951 in Athens, Greece	1947		Nikos Athanasiou Veēs (1882–1958); Greece
	Angelos Sikelianos	28 March 1884 in Lefkada, Greece	19 June 1951 in Athens, Greece	1948		Elin Wägner (1882–1949); Sweden
	Angelos Sikelianos	28 March 1884 in Lefkada, Greece	19 June 1951 in Athens, Greece	1948		Axel Waldemar Persson (1888–1951); Sweden
	Angelos Sikelianos	28 March 1884 in Lefkada, Greece	19 June 1951 in Athens, Greece	1949, 1951		Sigfrid Siwertz (1882–1970); Sweden
	Angelos Sikelianos	28 March 1884 in Lefkada, Greece	19 June 1951 in Athens, Greece	1950		Hjalmar Gullberg (1898–1961); Sweden
	Angelos Sikelianos	28 March 1884 in Lefkada, Greece	19 June 1951 in Athens, Greece	1950		Hellenic Authors' Society
	Gregorios Xenopoulos	9 December 1867 in Istanbul, Turkey	14 January 1951 in Athens, Greece	1947		Iōannēs Kalitsounakēs (1878–1966); Greece (Note: Several other members of the Academy of Athens joined in the nomination.)
	Nikos Kazantzakis	18 February 1883 in Heraklion, Crete, Greece	26 October 1957 in Freiburg im Breisgau, Baden-Württemberg, Germany	1947		Nikos Athanasiou Veēs (1882–1958); Greece
	Nikos Kazantzakis	18 February 1883 in Heraklion, Crete, Greece	26 October 1957 in Freiburg im Breisgau, Baden-Württemberg, Germany	1950		Hjalmar Gullberg (1898–1961); Sweden
	Nikos Kazantzakis	18 February 1883 in Heraklion, Crete, Greece	26 October 1957 in Freiburg im Breisgau, Baden-Württemberg, Germany	1951		Sigfrid Siwertz (1882–1970); Sweden
	Nikos Kazantzakis	18 February 1883 in Heraklion, Crete, Greece	26 October 1957 in Freiburg im Breisgau, Baden-Württemberg, Germany	1952		Norwegian Authors' Union
	Nikos Kazantzakis	18 February 1883 in Heraklion, Crete, Greece	26 October 1957 in Freiburg im Breisgau, Baden-Württemberg, Germany	1953		Hans Heiberg (1904–1978); Norway
	Nikos Kazantzakis	18 February 1883 in Heraklion, Crete, Greece	26 October 1957 in Freiburg im Breisgau, Baden-Württemberg, Germany	1954		Henry Olsson (1896–1985); Sweden
	Nikos Kazantzakis	18 February 1883 in Heraklion, Crete, Greece	26 October 1957 in Freiburg im Breisgau, Baden-Württemberg, Germany	1955, 1956, 1957		Society of Men of Letters of Greece
	Nikos Kazantzakis	18 February 1883 in Heraklion, Crete, Greece	26 October 1957 in Freiburg im Breisgau, Baden-Württemberg, Germany	1955		Lorentz Eckhoff (1884–1974); Norway
	Nikos Kazantzakis	18 February 1883 in Heraklion, Crete, Greece	26 October 1957 in Freiburg im Breisgau, Baden-Württemberg, Germany	1956		Johannes Andreasson Dale (1898–1975); Norway
	Nikos Kazantzakis	18 February 1883 in Heraklion, Crete, Greece	26 October 1957 in Freiburg im Breisgau, Baden-Württemberg, Germany	1956, 1957		Samuel Baud-Bovy (1906–1986)
	Georgios Drossinis	9 December 1859 in Athens, Greece	3 January 1951 in Kifisia, Attica, Greece	1947		Phaidōn Koukoules (Note: Several other members of the Academy of Athens joined in the nomination.) (1881–1956); Greece
	Georgios Drossinis	9 December 1859 in Athens, Greece	3 January 1951 in Kifisia, Attica, Greece	1947		Iōannēs Kalitsounakēs (1878–1966); Greece
	Georgios Drossinis	9 December 1859 in Athens, Greece	3 January 1951 in Kifisia, Attica, Greece	1947, 1948		Geōrgios Oikonomos (1882–1951); Greece
