= Bibliography of André Gide =

French author and winner of the Nobel Prize in Literature

André Paul Guillaume Gide (French: [ɑ̃dʁe pɔl ɡijom ʒid]; 22 November 1869 – 19 February 1951) was a French author and winner of the Nobel Prize in Literature in 1947 "for his comprehensive and artistically significant writings, in which human problems and conditions have been presented with a fearless love of truth and keen psychological insight". Gide's career ranged from its beginnings in the symbolist movement, to the advent of anticolonialism between the two World Wars.

Known for his fiction as well as his autobiographical works, Gide exposes to public view the conflict and eventual reconciliation of the two sides of his personality, split apart by a straitlaced traducing of education and a narrow social moralism. Gide's work can be seen as an investigation of freedom and empowerment in the face of moralistic and puritanical constraints, and centres on his continuous effort to achieve intellectual honesty. His self-exploratory texts reflect his search of how to be fully oneself, even to the point of owning one's sexual nature, without at the same time betraying one's values. His political activity is informed by the same ethos, as indicated by his repudiation of communism after his 1936 voyage to the USSR.

== Selected works ==
=== Novels, novellas, stories ===
- Les cahiers d'André Walter – (The Notebooks of André Walter) - 1891 - A semi-autobiographical novel (written in the form of a journal) that explores Gide's teen years and his relationships with his cousin Madeleine ("Emmanuèle" in the novel) and his mother.
- Le voyage d'Urien – (The Voyage of Urien) - 1893 - The title is "clearly a pun on voyage du rien, meaning voyage of/into nothing." A Symbolist novella - Urien and his companions set sail on the fabulous ship Orion to mythological lands, to the stagnant sea of boredom, and to the icy sea.
- Paludes – (Marshlands) - 1895 - "A satire of literary Paris in general, the world of the salons and cénacles, and, in particular, of the group of more-or-less Symbolist young writers who frequented Mallarmé's salon."
- El Hadj - 1896 - A tale of nineteen pages in the French edition and subtitled "The Treatise of the False Prophet," the narrator (El Hadj) tells of a prince who sets out on a journey with the men of his city. After the prince dies, El Hadj conceals the truth and, forced to become a prophet, he leads the men home.
- Le Prométhée mal enchaîné – (Prometheus Ill-Bound) - 1899 - A light-hearted satiric novella in which Prometheus leaves his mountain, enters a Paris cafe, and converses with other mythical figures and the waiter about the eagle eating his liver.
- L'immoraliste – (The Immoralist) - 1902 - The story of a man, Michel, who travels through Europe and North Africa, attempting to transcend the limitations of conventional morality by surrendering to his appetites (including his attraction to young Arab boys), while neglecting his wife Marceline.
- Le retour de l'enfant prodigue – (The Return of the Prodigal Son) – 1907 – Begins almost where the parable in Chapter 15 of the Gospel of Luke ends. – But with Gide's insight into character, the prodigal son does not simply return when he is destitute: he is also "tired of caprice" and "disenchanted with himself." – He has stripped himself bare in a reaction against the suffocating luxury of his father's house.
- La porte étroite – (Strait Is the Gate) - 1909 - The title comes from Matthew 7:13-14: "Strait is the gate, and narrow is the way, which leadeth unto life, and few there be that find it." Set in the Protestant upper-middle-class world of Normandy in the 1880s and reflecting Gide's own relationship with his cousin Madeleine, Jerome loves his cousin Alissa, but fails to find happiness.
- Isabelle – 1911 - The tale of a young man whose studies take him to the remote country home of an eccentric family, where he falls in love with a portrait of their absent daughter. As he unravels the mystery of her absence, he is forced to abandon his passionate ideal. Published with The Pastoral Symphony in Two Symphonies by Vintage Books.
- Les Caves du Vatican – (translated as Lafcadio's Adventures or The Vatican Cellars) - 1914 - Divided into five sections, each named after a character, this farcical story "wanders through numerous capitals of Europe, and involves saints, adventurers, pickpockets…" and centers on the character Lafcadio Wluiki, an adolescent boy who kills a stranger for no reason except personal curiosity about the nature of morality. The plot also involves a gang of French confidence-men who pose as Catholic priests and scam wealthy Catholics by telling them that the Pope has been captured by Freemasons and replaced with an impostor, and that large sums of money are needed in order to rescue the real Pope.
- La Symphonie Pastorale – (The Pastoral Symphony) - 1919 - A story of the illicit love between a pastor and the blind orphan whom he rescues from poverty and raises in his own home. His attempt to shield her from the knowledge of evil ends in tragedy. Published with Isabelle in Two Symphonies by Vintage Books.
- Les faux-monnayeurs – (The Counterfeiters) - 1925 - An honest treatment of homosexuality and the collapse of morality in middle-class France. As a young writer Edouard attempts to write a novel called Les Faux Monnayeurs, he and his friends Olivier and Bernard pursue a search for knowledge in themselves and their relationships.
- L'école des femmes – (The School for Wives) - 1929
- Robert – 1930
- Geneviève – 1936

(Three novellas later published in one volume.)

A tripartite and delicate dissection of a marriage, as evidenced through the journals of a man, his wife and their daughter. In The School for Wives, it is Eveline's narrative, from the first elation of her love for Robert, a love which finds no flaw and only self-effacement before the assured superiority of her husband. And then later the recognition of his many weaknesses, the desire to leave him - and concomitantly the Catholic faith. In turn it is Robert's story, in part a justification, in part an expression of his love for his wife, and of the growing religious belief which coincides with Eveline's rejection of hers. And lastly their daughter Genevieve recalls an incident in her youth, in no way connected with the drama played out between her parents.... Overall, a not always integrated... examination of moral and religious unrest...

- Thésée – (Theseus) - 1946 - The mythical hero of Athens, now elderly, narrates his life story from his carefree youth to his killing of the Minotaur.
- La Ramier – - 2002 - Published posthumously by his daughter. Describes a wild erotic night between Gide and a young man named Ferdinand based on an actual encounter the author had.

=== Poetical and lyrical works ===
- Les poésies d'André Walter – (The Poems of André Walter) - 1892 - A sequence of twenty poems, originally published under the pseudonym of the hero of Gide's first novel.
- La tentative amoureuse, ou le traité du vain désir – (The Attempt at Love, or The Treatise of Vain Desire) - 1893 - The story of two lovers, Luc and Rachel – The course of their love follows the four seasons, "coming to birth in spring, maturing in the summer and dying in the autumn; by the winter, it is dead and the two young people separate."
- Les nourritures terrestres – 1897 (literally meaning "Earthly Food" and translated as The Fruits of the Earth) - "A work of mixed forms: verse, prose poem, travelogue, memoir and dialogue...In the first part, Gide describes his visits to southern Italy, a farm in Normandy, and various locales in North Africa. The persistent theme is living in the present and soaking up sensations and experiences, whether pleasant or unpleasant... The second part, written when Gide was in his sixties, is an endorsement of his youthful philosophy, as well as a broader comment on its religious and political context."
- L'offrande lyrique – (Lyrical Offering) - 1913 - A French translation of the English version of The Gitanjali by the Bengali poet Rabindranath Tagore.
- Les nouvelles nourritures – 1935 - "A reprise of certain of the major themes of the first Nourritures. (Gide regretted its publication)."

=== Plays ===
- Philoctète – (Philoctetes) - 1899 - Broadly borrowed from the play by Sophocles. Philoctetes was left behind by Odysseus and his men after his wound from a snake bite began to stink. Now, ten years later, Odysseus returns to the deserted island where they left Philoctetes, to retrieve Heracles' bow and arrows.
- Le roi Candaule – (King Candaules) - 1901 - Taken from stories in Herodotus and Plato, the Lydian King Candaules believes his wife to be the most beautiful woman and wishes to show her off to the humble fisherman Gyges.
- Saül – 1903 - A tragedy that shows the "downfall of a king who loses the favor of his Lord and is made a prey of evil spirits."
- Bethsabé – (Bathsheba) - 1912 - An unfinished, lesser play, consisting of three monologues spoken by David on his infatuation for Bathsheba, Uriah's wife.
- Œdipe – (Oedipus) - 1931 - A retelling of the play by Sophocles, written at a time when Gide was breaking free of his own Oedipal complex and realizing that "his years of exalted conjugal devotion were no more than the recapitulation of his infantile desire for exclusive possession of his mother."
- Perséphone – 1943 - Based on an earlier unfinished series of poems Proserpine and retitled Perséphone. "A dramatic poem in the Symbolist manner on the Persephone myth, presented as an opera-ballet, with music by Igor Stravinsky and choreography by Kurt Jooss."
- Le retour – (The Return) - 1946 - An unfinished libretto for a projected opera with Raymond Bonheur on the story of The Prodigal Son. Gide wrote this in 1900, and it was published in book form in France in 1946.
- Le procès – (The Process) - 1947 - Co-written with Jean-Louis Barrault, this play is drawn from Kafka's novel Der Prozess (The Trial).

=== Autobiographical works ===
- Si le grain ne meurt – (translated as If It Die) - 1926 - (The original title means "Unless the grain dies," and comes from John 12:24: "Except a corn of wheat fall into the ground and die, it abideth alone: but if it die, it bringeth forth much fruit.") - Gide's autobiography of his childhood and youth, ending with the death of his mother in 1895.
- Et Nunc Manet in Te - - (translated as Madeleine) - 1951 - (The original title comes from a quote of the Roman poet Virgil - referring to Orpheus and his lost wife Eurydice - meaning "And now she remains in you.") Gide's memoir of his wife Madeleine and their complex relationship and unconsummated marriage. While she was alive, Gide had excluded all references to his wife in his writings. This was published after her death.
- Journals, 1889–1949 – Published in four volumes - translated and edited by Justin O'Brien - Also available in an abridged two-volume edition. "Beginning with a single entry for the year 1889, when he was twenty, and continuing throughout his life, the Journals of André Gide constitute an enlightening, moving, and endlessly fascinating chronicle of creative energy and conviction."
- Ainsi-soit-il, ou: Les jeux sont faits – (So Be It, or The Chips Are Down) - 1952 - Gide's final memoirs, published posthumously.

=== Travel writings ===
- Amyntas – (North African Journals) - 1906 - (translated into English by Richard Howard under the same title.) Contains four parts: Mopsus, Wayside Pages (Feuilles de Route), Biskra to Touggourt; and Travel Foregone (Le Renoncement au Voyage). The title alludes to Virgil's Eclogues, in which Amyntas and Mopsus (the title of Gide's first sketch) are the names of graceful shepherds. Written between 1899 and 1904, these journals recall Gide's journey to North Africa, scene of his first significant encounter with a beloved Arab boy. The exotic country of North Africa enraptures Gide - the enchantment of the souk, the narrow odorous streets, the hashish dens, the glowing colors of sky, the desert itself.
- La marche Turque – (Journey to Turkey) - 1914 - Hastily written notes on Gide's trip to Turkey.
- Voyage au Congo – (Travels in the Congo) - 1927
- Le retour de Tchad – (The Return from Chad) - 1928

On his return in 1927 from an extensive tour of French Equatorial Africa, Gide published these two travel notebooks. Among other things his report contained a documented account of the inhuman treatment of African laborers by the companies that held exploiting concessions in the colonies. This indictment had obviously political overtones which tended to make Gide the ally of the anti-colonialist, anti-capitalist left.

- Retour de l'U. R. S. S. – (Return from the U.S.S.R.) - 1936 - Not a true travel book (there are no dates or chronology), but rather Gide's assessment of Soviet society, progressing from delighted approval to bitter criticism.
- Retouches à mon retour de l'U. R. S. S. – (Afterthoughts: A Sequel to Return from the U.S.S.R.) - 1937
- A Naples - Reconnaissance à l'Italie – (To Naples - A Trip to Italy) - 1937 - Published posthumously.

Gide agreed to contribute to a collection of essays in which notable intellectuals would describe their conversion to and disillusionment with Communism. When his health prevented him from authoring such an essay, Enid Starkie, at the editor's request and under Gide's direction, crafted an essay from his two publications from the 1930s. It appeared in The God That Failed (1949).

=== Philosophical and religious writings ===
- Corydon – 1920 - Four Socratic-style dialogues that explore the nature of homosexuality and its place in society. The title comes from the name of a shepherd who loved boys in Virgil's Eclogues.
- Numquid et tu . . .? – 1922 - (The title comes from a quote from the book of John (7:47-52) that means "Are you also [deceived]?") Gide's notebook which documents his religious quest, much of it consisting of his comments on Biblical quotations, often comparing the Latin and French translations.
- Un esprit non prevenu - (An Unprejudiced Mind) - 1929

=== Criticism on literature, art and music ===
- Le traité du Narcisse: Theorie du symbole – (The Treatise of Narcissus: Theory of the Symbol) - 1891 - A work on Symbolism, Gide begins with the myth of Narcissus, then explores the meaning of the Symbol and the truth behind it.
- Réflexions sur quelques points de littérature – (Reflections on Some Points of Literature) - 1897
- Lettres à Angèle – (Letters to Angèle) - 1900 - Angèle was the name of the cultivated literary hostess in Gide's novel Paludes. These letters are short essays on literary topics originally published in the literary review L'Ermitage and later collected in book form.
- De l'influence en littérature – (On Influence in Literature) - 1900 - The text of a lecture Gide gave to Libre Esthétique (a Brussels literary society), and later published in the journal L'Ermitage. A praise of influence – only weaker artists fear the influence of other minds – the strong artist embraces it.
- Les limites de l'art – (The Limits of Art) - 1901
- De l'importance du public – (The Importance of the Public) - 1903 - Gide discusses his movement away from Symbolism and "Art for Art's Sake" towards the need to communicate with a wider public.
- Oscar Wilde – (Oscar Wilde: A Study) - 1910
- Dostoïevsky – 1923
- Le journal des faux-monnayeurs – (The Journal for The Counterfeiters) – 1926 – Gide's working notes for his novel The Counterfeiters, in the form of a journal.
- Essai sur Montaigne – (Living Thoughts of Montaigne) - 1929
- Découvrons Henri Michaux – (Discovering Henri Michaux) - 1941 - The text of a talk Gide gave to a literary society on his friend, the Belgian poet Henri Michaux.
- Paul Valéry – 1947
- Notes sur Chopin – 1948 - Reflecting Gide's love of Chopin, this work urges the pianist who plays Chopin to seek, invent, improvise, and gradually discover the composer's thoughts.
- Anthologie de la poésie française – 1949 - Anthology of French poets, edited by Gide.

=== Collections of essays and lectures ===
- Prétextes (Pretexts: Reflections on Literature and Morality) – 1903
- Nouveaux prétextes – 1911
- Morceaux choisis - 1921
- Incidences – 1924
- Ne jugez pas – (Judge Not) – 1931 - A collection of three previously published essays with legal themes - Souvenirs de la Cour d'assises (Recollections on the Assize Court); L'Affaire Redureau; (The Redurou Affair) and La séquestrée de Poitiers. (The Prisoner of Poitiers)
- Littérature engagée – 1950 - A collection of Gide's political articles and speeches.
