= 1947 Nobel Prize in Literature =

- André Gide
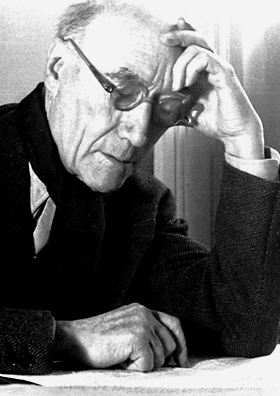
- "for his comprehensive and artistically significant writings, in which human problems and conditions have been presented with a fearless love of truth and keen psychological insight"
- Date: 13 November 1947 (announcement); 10 December 1947 (ceremony)
- Location: Stockholm, Sweden
- Presented by: Swedish Academy
- First award: 1901
- Website: Official website

The 1947 Nobel Prize in Literature was awarded to the French author André Gide (1869–1951) "for his comprehensive and artistically significant writings, in which human problems and conditions have been presented with a fearless love of truth and keen psychological insight".

== Laureate ==
André Gide's early works such as the prose poem Les nourritures terrestres ("Fruits of the Earth", 1897) were influenced by French symbolism. Later notable works include The L'Immoraliste ("The Immoralist", 1902), La Porte Étroite ("Strait is the Gate", 1907) and La Symphonie pastorale ("The Pastoral Symphony", 1919). The autobiographical Si le grain ne meurt ("If It Die...", 1924) is regarded as one of the great works of confessional literature. In 1926, his most complex novel Les faux-monnayeurs ("The Counterfeiters") was published.

== Deliberations ==
=== Nominations ===
André Gide had only been nominated for the prize once before in 1946. In 1947, the Nobel committee received 43 nominations for 35 writers including T. S. Eliot (awarded in 1948), Boris Pasternak (awarded in 1958), Teixeira de Pascoaes, Jules Romains, Angelos Sikelianos, Carl Sandburg, Georges Duhamel, Ignazio Silone, Benedetto Croce, Ramon Perez de Ayala, Arnulf Øverland, Johan Falkberget and Marie Under. Eleven were nominated first-time such as Pär Lagerkvist (awarded in 1951), Ernest Hemingway (awarded in 1954), Mikhail Sholokov (awarded in 1965), Shmuel Yosef Agnon (awarded in 1966), Toyohiko Kagawa, Georgios Drossinis, Nikos Kazantzakis, Bernard O'Dowd and André Malraux. Most nominations were submitted for Henriette Charasson and Charles-Ferdinand Ramuz with three nominations each. Four were female nominees namely Henriette Charasson, Maria Madalena de Martel Patrício, Maila Talvio and Marie Under.

The authors James Agate, Marie Belloc Lowndes, J. D. Beresford, Tristan Bernard, Jean-Richard Bloch, Svend Borberg, Wolfgang Borchert, Margaret Cameron, Emilio Carrere, Willa Cather, Sigurd Christiansen, Winston Churchill, Morris Raphael Cohen, Ananda Coomaraswamy, Max Dessoir, Léon-Paul Fargue, Joaquín Gallegos Lara, Edith Maud Hull, Richard Le Gallienne, William Le Queux, Gurli Linder, Hugh Lofting, Manuel Machado, Arthur Machen, Emma Orczy, Nicholas Roerich, Margaret Marshall Saunders, Balys Sruoga, Flora Thompson, E. C. Vivian, Swami Vipulananda and Alfred North Whitehead died in 1947 without having been nominated for the prize.

Official list of nominees and their nominators for the prize
| No. | Nominee | Country | Genre(s) | Nominator(s) |
|---|---|---|---|---|
| 1 | Mark Aldanov (1886–1957) | Soviet Union (Ukraine); France | biography, novel, essays, literary criticism | Ivan Bunin (1870–1953) |
| 2 | Shmuel Yosef Agnon (1887–1970) | Mandatory Palestine | novel, short story | Hugo Bergmann (1883–1975) |
| 3 | Sholem Asch (1880–1957) | Poland; United States | novel, short story, drama, essays | Walter Arthur Berendsohn (1884–1984) |
| 4 | Eugène Baie (1874–1964) | Belgium | law, essays | Maurice Maeterlinck (1862–1949) |
| 5 | Nikolai Berdyaev (1874–1948) | Soviet Union (Ukraine) | philosophy, theology | Alf Nyman (1884–1968) |
| 6 | Henriette Charasson (1884–1972) | France | poetry, essays, drama, novel, literary criticism, biography | Serge Barrault (1887–1976); Pierre Fernessole (1879–1965); Pierre Moreau (1895–1972) |
| 7 | Benedetto Croce (1866–1952) | Italy | history, philosophy, law | Bernardino Barbadoro (1889–1961) |
| 8 | Maria Madalena de Martel Patrício (1884–1947) | Portugal | poetry, essays | António Baião (1878–1961) |
| 9 | Teixeira de Pascoaes (1877–1952) | Portugal | poetry | João António Mascarenhas Júdice (1898–1957) |
| 10 | Georgios Drossinis (1859–1951) | Greece | poetry, novel, short story | Geōrgios Oikonomos (1882–1951); Phaidōn Koukoules (1881–1956); Iōannēs Kalitsounakēs (1878–1966) (Note: Several other members of the Academy of Athens joined in the nomination.) |
| 11 | Georges Duhamel (1884–1966) | France | novel, short story, poetry, drama, literary criticism | Denis Saurat (1890–1958); Hjalmar Hammarskjöld (1862–1953) |
| 12 | Thomas Stearns Eliot (1888–1965) | United States; United Kingdom | poetry, essays, drama | Gustaf Hellström (1882–1953) |
| 13 | Johan Falkberget (1879–1967) | Norway | novel, short story, essays | Eivind Berggrav (1884–1959); Harry Fett (1875–1962) |
| 14 | André Gide (1869–1951) | France | novel, short story, poetry, drama, memoir, essays | Lorentz Eckhoff (1884–1974) |
| 15 | Ernest Hemingway (1899–1961) | United States | novel, short story, screenplay | Hjalmar Gullberg (1898–1961) |
| 16 | Toyohiko Kagawa (1888–1960) | Japan | essays | Knut Westman (1881–1967) |
| 17 | Horace Kallen (1882–1974) | United States | philosophy, essays | Louise Rosenblatt (1904–2005) |
| 18 | Nikos Kazantzakis (1883–1957) | Greece | novel, philosophy, essays, drama, memoir, translation | Nikos Athanasiou Veēs (1882–1958) (Note: Veēs suggests that the Prize be possibly shared by Sikelianos and Kazantzakis.) |
| 19 | Pär Lagerkvist (1891–1974) | Sweden | poetry, novel, short story, drama | Henrik Schück (1855–1947) |
| 20 | André Malraux (1901–1976) | France | novel, essays, literary criticism | Henri Peyre (1901–1988) |
| 21 | Charles Langbridge Morgan (1894–1958) | United Kingdom | drama, novel, essays, poetry | Sigfrid Siwertz (1882–1970) |
| 22 | Bernard O'Dowd (1866–1953) | Australia | poetry, essays | Ian Ramsay Maxwell (1901–1979); Several other professors from Australia and New Zealand |
| 23 | Arnulf Øverland (1889–1968) | Norway | poetry, essays | Harry Fett (1875–1962) |
| 24 | Boris Pasternak (1890–1960) | Soviet Union | poetry, novel, translation | Maurice Bowra (1898–1971) |
| 25 | Branislav Petronijević (1875–1954) | Yugoslavia (Serbia) | philosophy | Vladeta Popović (1894–1951) |
| 26 | Ramón Pérez de Ayala (1880–1962) | Spain | novel, poetry, literary criticism | Edgar Allison Peers (1891–1952) |
| 27 | Charles Ferdinand Ramuz (1878–1947) | Switzerland | novel, poetry, short story | Hjalmar Hammarskjöld (1862–1953); Henri de Ziégler (1885–1970); Albert Béguin (1901–1957) |
| 28 | Jules Romains (1885–1972) | France | poetry, drama, screenplay | Holger Sten (1907–1971); Lorentz Eckhoff (1884–1974) |
| 29 | Carl Sandburg (1878–1967) | United States | poetry, essays, biography | Einar Tegen (1884–1965) |
| 30 | Mikhail Sholokhov (1905–1984) | Soviet Union | novel | Henry Olsson (1896–1985) |
| 31 | Angelos Sikelianos (1884–1951) | Greece | poetry, drama | Nikos Athanasiou Veēs (1882–1958) |
| 32 | Ignazio Silone (1900–1978) | Italy | novel, short story, essays, drama | Fredrik Böök (1883–1961) |
| 33 | Maila Talvio (1871–1951) | Finland | novel, short story, translation | Veikko Antero Koskenniemi (1885–1962) |
| 34 | Marie Under (1883–1980) | Soviet Union (Estonia) | poetry | Hjalmar Hammarskjöld (1862–1953) |
| 35 | Gregorios Xenopoulos (1867–1951) | Greece | novel, drama, essays, literary criticism | Iōannēs Kalitsounakēs (1878–1966) |

== Prize decision ==
In 1947, the Nobel committee's recommended candidates for that year's prize were André Gide, Greek author Angelos Sikelianos and American-British T. S. Eliot. A majority of the committee, Anders Österling, Hjalmar Gullberg and Sigfrid Siwertz, advocated a prize to Gide, while committee member Fredrik Böök proposed Sikelianos, with Eliot as his second proposal.

On 13 November 1947, the Swedish Academy decided that that year's Nobel Prize in Literature should be awarded to André Gide "for his comprehensive and artistically significant writings, in which human problems and conditions have been presented with a fearless love of truth and keen psychological insight".

== Award ceremony ==
At the award ceremony in Stockholm on 10 December 1947, Anders Österling, permanent secretary of the Swedish Academy, said:

Behind the strange and incessant shift in perspective that Gide’s work offers to us, in the novels as well as in the essays, in the travel diaries, or in the analyses of contemporary events, we always find the same supple intelligence, the same incorruptible psychology, expressed in a language which, by the most sober means, attains a wholly classic limpidity and the most delicate variety. (...)

Through all the phases of his evolution, Gide has appeared as a true defender of literary integrity, founded on the personality’s right and duty to present all its problems resolutely and honestly. From this point of view, his long and varied activity, stimulated in so many ways, unquestionably represents an idealistic value.

For reasons of health, André Gide was unable to be present at the award ceremony. His prize was accepted by the French ambassador.
