= 1954 Nobel Prize in Literature =

- Ernest Hemingway
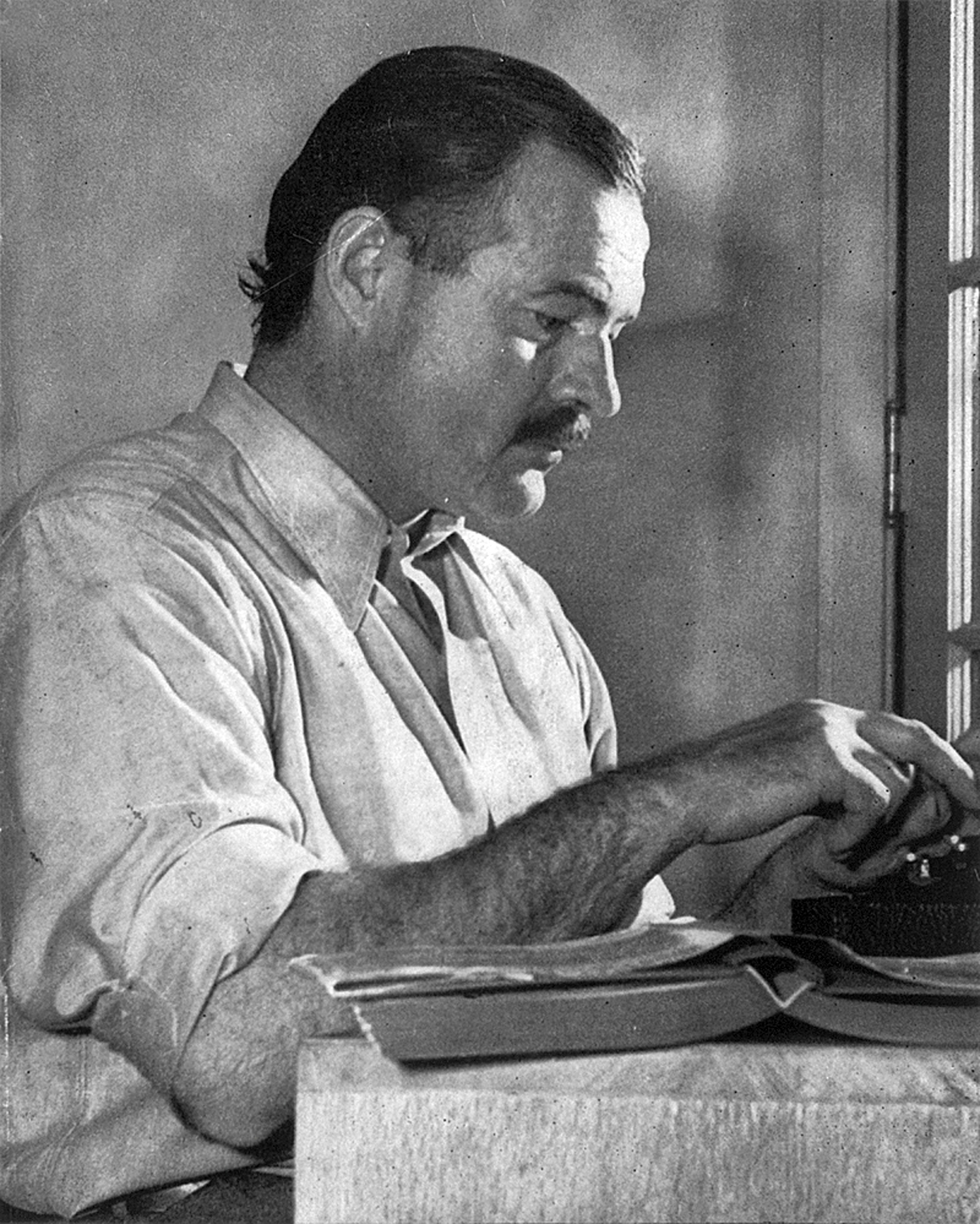
- "for his mastery of the art of narrative, most recently demonstrated in The Old Man and the Sea, and for the influence that he has exerted on contemporary style"
- Date: 28 October 1954 (announcement); 10 December 1954 (ceremony)
- Location: Stockholm, Sweden
- Presented by: Swedish Academy
- Hosted by: Anders Österling
- First award: 1901
- Website: Official website

The 1954 Nobel Prize in Literature was awarded to the American author Ernest Hemingway (1899–1961) "for his mastery of the art of narrative, most recently demonstrated in The Old Man and the Sea, and for the influence that he has exerted on contemporary style."

Following William Faulkner in 1949, Hemingway is the fifth American to be a recipient of the prize.

== Laureate ==
Ernest Hemingway is known for his succinct and lucid prose had a powerful influence on 20th century fiction. His works explore love, war, wilderness, and loss. The theme of emasculation is also prevalent in his works, most notably in The Sun Also Rises (1926). In 1952, he published The Old Man and the Sea, a work that was praised by the Swedish Academy when awarding the Nobel Prize. Among his other famous works are A Farewell to Arms (1929) and For Whom the Bell Tolls (1940).

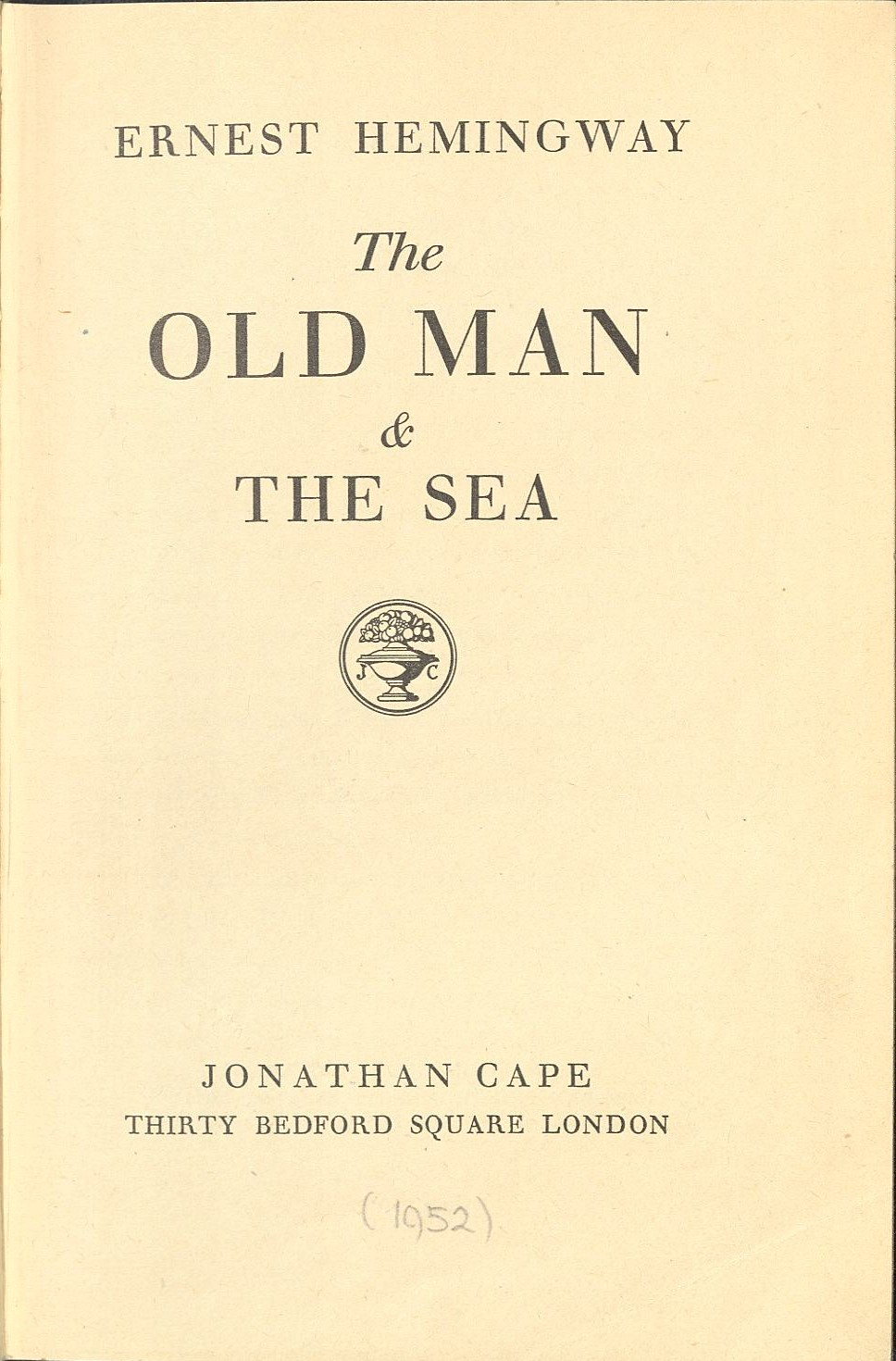
Hemingway's The Old Man and the Sea

=== The Old Man and the Sea ===
Hemingway's short novel The Old Man and the Sea was specifically referred to in his Nobel citation. Drawing on his personal experiences as a fisherman in crafting the novella, it tells the tragic story of a Cuban fisherman in the Gulf Stream and the giant Marlin he kills and loses. It won the 1953 Pulitzer Prize for Fiction.

== Deliberations ==
=== Nominations ===
Ernest Hemingway was nominated for the prize on four occasions between 1947 and 1954, the first three times by members of the Swedish Academy and in 1954 by an Austrian professor of English linguistics.

In total, the Nobel committee received 35 nominations for 27 writers. The most number of nominations were for Halldór Kiljan Laxness with 6 nominations. Other nominated authors included André Malraux, Nikos Kazantzakis, Rudolf Kassner, Mark Aldanov, E. M. Forster, Gottfried Benn, Ramón Menéndez Pidal, and Robert Frost. 5 of the nominees were nominated first-time among them Carl Jung, Ricardo Rojas, and Jaroslav Seifert (awarded in 1984). Two of the nominees were women: Henriette Charasson and Concha Espina de la Serna.

The authors Sait Faik Abasıyanık, Frederick Lewis Allen, Juan Álvarez, Vitaliano Brancati, Frans G. Bengtsson, Maxwell Bodenheim, Ludovic Dauș, Stig Dagerman, Oswald de Andrade, Winnifred Eaton, Miles Franklin, Boris Gorbatov, Joseph Hergesheimer, James Hilton, Édouard Le Roy, Zofia Nałkowska, Mikhail Prishvin, Sokotsu Samukawa, Hella Wuolijoki and Francis Brett Young died in 1954 without having been nominated for the prize.

Official list of nominees and their nominators for the prize
No.	Nominee	Country	Genre(s)	Nominator(s)
1	Mark Aldanov (1886–1957)	Soviet Union (Ukraine); France	biography, novel, essays, literary criticism	Samson Soloveitchik (1887–1974)
2	Riccardo Bacchelli (1891–1985)	Italy	novel, drama, essays	Accademia dei Lincei
3	Julien Benda (1867–1956)	France	novel, philosophy, essays, literary criticism	Holger Sten (1907–1971)
4	Gottfried Benn (1886–1956)	West Germany	poetry, essays	Ernst Alker (1895–1972); Bertil Malmberg (1889–1958)
5	Martin Buber (1878–1965)	Austria; Israel	philosophy	Fritz Strich (1882–1963)
6	Albert Camus (1913–1960)	France (Algeria)	novel, short story, essays, philosophy, drama	Birger Ekeberg (1880–1968); Harry Martinson (1904–1978)
7	Henriette Charasson (1884–1972)	France	poetry, essays, drama, novel, literary criticism, biography	Pierre Moreau (1895–1972)
8	Concha Espina de la Serna (1869–1955)	Spain	novel, short story	Jacinto Benavente (1866–1954)
9	Johan Falkberget (1879–1967)	Norway	novel, short story, essays	Hans Heiberg (1904–1978)
10	Edward Morgan Forster (1879–1970)	United Kingdom	novel, short story, drama, essays, biography, literary criticism	John Ronald Reuel Tolkien (1892–1973); Lord David Cecil (1902–1986); Frank Percy Wilson (1889–1963)
11	Robert Frost (1874–1963)	United States	poetry, drama	Sten Selander (1891–1957)
12	Franz Hellens (1881–1972)	Belgium	novel, poetry, literary criticism	Émilie Carner-Noulet (1892–1978)
13	Ernest Hemingway (1899–1961)	United States	novel, short story, screenplay	Leo von Hibler-Lebmannsport (1884–1956)
14	Juan Ramón Jiménez (1881–1958)	Spain	poetry, novel	Harry Martinson (1904–1978)
15	Carl Jung (1875–1961)	Switzerland	philosophy, essays	Ernst Alker (1895–1972)
16	Rudolf Kassner (1873–1959)	Austria	philosophy, essays, translation	Ernst Alker (1895–1972)
17	Nikos Kazantzakis (1883–1957)	Greece	novel, philosophy, essays, drama, memoir, translation	Henry Olsson (1896–1985)
18	Halldór Laxness (1902–1998)	Iceland	novel, short story, drama, poetry	Jón Helgason (1899–1986); Sigurður Nordal (1886–1974); Kemp Malone (1889–1971); Steingrímur Þorsteinsson (1911–1973); Hans Kuhn (1899–1988); Gabriel Turville-Petre (1908–1978); Prince Wilhelm, Duke of Södermanland (1884–1965)
19	André Malraux (1901–1976)	France	novel, essays, literary criticism	Georges Blin (1917–2015)
20	Max Mell (1882–1971)	Austria	drama, novel, screenplay	Austrian Academy of Sciences
21	Ramón Menéndez Pidal (1869–1968)	Spain	philology, history	Gunnar Tilander (1894–1973)
22	Ricardo Rojas Sosa (1882–1957)	Argentina	poetry, history, drama, pedagogy, essays	Ramón Menéndez Pidal (1869–1968) and a number of learned societies and individuals
23	Jaroslav Seifert (1901–1986)	Czechoslovakia	poetry, memoir, translation	Albert Prazák (1880–1956)
24	Herman Teirlinck (1879–1967)	Belgium	novel, poetry, essays, drama	Royal Academy of Dutch Language and Literature
25	Gustave Vanzype (1869–1955)	Belgium	novel, drama, short story	Gustave Charlier (1885–1959)
26	Tarjei Vesaas (1897–1970)	Norway	poetry, novel	Sigmund Skard (1903–1995)
27	Georges Vouyouklatis (1903–1956)	Greece	poetry, essays	Writers Association of the Hellenes

=== Prize decision ===
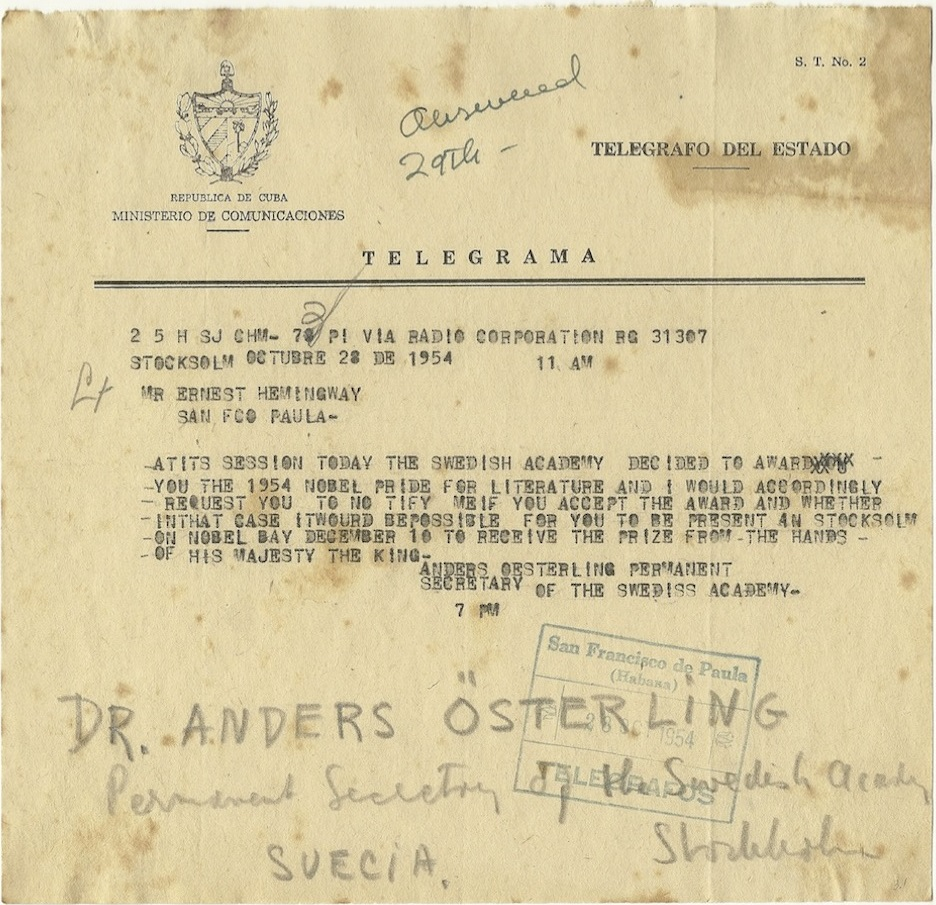
Telegram from the Swedish Academy's permanent secretary sent to Ernest Hemingway, informing him about the Academy's decision to award him the 1954 Nobel prize for Literature.

Hemingway's candidacy in 1947 was rejected by committee member Per Hallström, saying in a report that Hemingway's style of writing were too entertaining and lightweight. Hemingway was considered and rejected again in 1950, when the Swedish Academy found that his recent book Across the River and Into the Trees was not as strong as his previous works and also noted that Hemingway already had a great deal of success, and that he was unlikely to need the prize money.

Nominated again in 1953, Hemingway was a serious contender for the prize in that year according to The New York Times, but his candidacy was postponed as members of the Academy thought that Hemingway and his wife may have perished in an air crash in Africa. Hemingway was included in the shortlisted nominees for the prize together with Albert Camus and Halldór Laxness – both authors were eventually awarded.

== Reactions ==
Hemingway was a favourite to receive the Nobel Prize in Literature in 1954 along with Halldór Kiljan Laxness. In an interview, he expressed his gladness in receiving the prize, saying: "I am very pleased and very proud to receive the Nobel Prize for Literature." He modestly told the press that Carl Sandburg, Isak Dinesen and Bernard Berenson deserved the prize, James Mellow says Hemingway "had coveted the Nobel Prize", but when he won it, months after his plane accidents and the ensuing worldwide press coverage, "there must have been a lingering suspicion in Hemingway's mind that his obituary notices had played a part in the academy's decision." Because he was suffering pain from the African accidents, he decided against traveling to Stockholm. Instead he sent a speech to be read, defining the writer's life:

Writing, at its best, is a lonely life. Organizations for writers palliate the writer's loneliness but I doubt if they improve his writing. He grows in public stature as he sheds his loneliness and often his work deteriorates. For he does his work alone and if he is a good enough writer he must face eternity, or the lack of it, each day.
