= Saül (disambiguation) =

Saül is a commune of French Guiana.

Saül may also refer to:

- Saül (opera), a 2003 opera by Flavio Testi
- Saül, a 1903 play by André Gide
