= List of 7 Seeds volumes =

7 Seeds was written and illustrated by Yumi Tamura and published by Shogakukan. It began serialization in the November 2001 issue of the monthly shōjo manga magazine Bessatsu Shōjo Comic; in April 2002, it transferred to the monthly josei manga magazine Flowers. The final chapter was published in the July 2017 issue of Flowers, released on May 27. Shogakukan collected the individual chapters into 35 bound volumes, printed under the Flower Comics imprint, and later, under the Flower Comics Alpha imprint. Each volume was divided into sections focusing on different groups of survivors, with section titles containing a kigo (seasonal word) appropriate for the group name.

In 2008, Pika Édition licensed the manga in France, where it was marketed as a seinen series. In 2011, Pika announced that negotiations with the Japanese publisher, Shogakukan, had been unsuccessful, and therefore, they would cease publishing 7 Seeds and two other titles. In total, Pika published 10 volumes of the manga in French.

In 2017, after the conclusion of the 7 Seeds manga in Japan, Tamura announced the launch of a spin-off series in Flowers. The first chapter was published in the magazine's October issue, released on August 28; the final chapter was published in the December issue, released on October 28. Shogakukan collected the chapters into a single bound volume on January 10, 2018.

== Volumes list ==
No.	Release date	ISBN
1	March 26, 2002	978-4-09-138013-5
Island Chapter (島の章, Shima no shō): 1. "Slow Awakening" (遅い目覚め, Osoi mezame); 2. "White Sound" (白い羽音, Shiroi haoto); 3. "Quiet Step" (静かな一歩, Shizukana ippo); 4. "Tender Beast" (柔らかな獣, Yawarakana kemono)
Natsu goes to sleep in her bedroom as usual, but when she awakens, the young woman finds herself amidst seven complete strangers in a hostile, wild environment, desperately struggling for survival. She is told that mankind has been destroyed by a meteorite and they have been sent many years into the future to preserve humanity.
2	September 26, 2002	978-4-09-138014-2
Island Chapter: 5. "The First Day" (はじまりの日, Hajimari no hi); Early Spring Chapter (早春の章, Sōshun no shō): 1. "Hana" (花, Hana); 2. "Water" (水, Mizu); 3. "Stars" (星, Hoshi)
Cruelly separated from her boyfriend and involuntarily thrown into the future, Hana gives it her best to survive and find her boyfriend. Not an easy task, with dangerous insects, unstable weather and hostile teammates around.
3	March 26, 2003	978-4-09-138015-9
Early Spring Chapter: 4. "Life" (命, Inochi); Beginning of Summer Chapter (立夏の章, Rikka no shō): 1. "Arashi" (嵐, Arashi); 2. "Castle" (城, Shiro); East Wind Chapter (東風の章, Higashikaze no shō): 1. "Way Home" (家路, Ieji); 2. "Spirit of Sound" (音霊, Otodama)
Hana's and Arashi's teams decide to return to their former homes, hoping to find out that all the stories about Japan being destroyed by a meteorite are just a lie, but as they travel through a country in ruins, all their hopes are shattered cruelly.
4	January 26, 2004	978-4-09-138016-6
East Wind Chapter: 3. "Sea of Trees" (樹海, Jūkai); 4. "Aim and Object" (その意味, Sono imi); Winter Chapter (冬の章, Fuyu no shō): 1. "Howling" (遠吠え, Tōboe); 2. "Rain at Night" (夜の雨, Yoru no ame); 3. "The Other Side of the Rainbow" (彼岸の虹, Higan no niji); 4. "Journey" (道程, Dōtei)
While Team Spring, exhausted from their long voyages, decides to settle down for the time being, the focus shifts to the third team. Team Winter's travels start out poorly with three of their members dying throughout the thawing process, leaving behind the other five in a country full of dangers. Fighting against beasts, cold and despair, the young Aramaki struggles to shape a path to survival in the New World.
5	August 26, 2004	978-4-09-138017-3
Pampas Grass Seeds Chapter (芒種の章, Bōshu no shō): 1. "Ants and Potatoes" (蟻と芋, Ari to imo); 2. "Earthworms and Corn" (蚯蚓と玉蜀黍, Mimizu to tōmorokoshi); 3. "Tobacco and Moon" (煙草と月, Tabako to tsuki); 4. "Milk and Grave" (ミルクと墓, Miruku to haka); 5. "Burning Wind and Cherry Blossoms" (熱風と桜, Neppū to sakura); 6. "June and October" (水無月と神無月, Minadzuki to kaminadzuki); Rainwater Chapter (雨水の章, Usui no shō): 1. "Damp soil awakens life" (土脉潤起, To myaku uruoi okoru)
Separated from Team Summer B, Arashi travels towards Tokyo with Semimaru and Natsu. They come across another team, a group calling themselves Team Autumn. Happy at first, the three have yet to realize how cruel humans can be.
6	May 26, 2005	978-4-09-138018-0
Rainwater Chapter: 2. "Mist begins to roll in" (霞始靆, Kasumi hajimete tanabiku); 3. "Trees and grass germinate" (草木萌動, Sōmoku kizashi ugoku); 4. "The door to hibernating insects opens" (蟄虫啓戸, Chitsu chuu ko o hiraku); 5. "The peach begins to smile" (桃始笑, Momo hajimete warau); 6. "Caterpillars morph into butterflies" (菜虫化蝶, Namushi chō tokasu); 7. "Sparrows begin nesting" (雀始巣, Suzume hajimete sukū); 8. "Cherry blossoms (Sakura) begin blooming" (桜始開, Sakura hajimete hiraku); 9. "Thunder Sounds" (雷乃発声, Rai sunawachi koe o hatsusu); 10. "Rainbows begin to appear" (虹始見, niji hajimete arawaru)
After fifteen years of lonesome travelling, Aramaki finally has made contact with Team Spring. But his new happiness does not last very long, as Hana falls victim to a deadly disease.
7	November 25, 2005	978-4-09-138019-7
Hail of Corn Chapter (穀雨の章, Kokū no shō): 1. "Ride of the Valkyries" (ワルキューレの騎行, Warukyūre no kikō); 2. "Peer Gynt Suite No.1, Op.46: Morning Mood" (ペール·ギュント組曲·朝, Pēru Gyunto kumikyoku: Asa); 3. "Humoresque" (ユーモレスク, Yūmoresuku); 4. "My Fatherland: Vltava 'The Moldau'" (我が祖国·モルダウ, Waga sokoku: Morudau); 5. "Song Of Farewell" (別れの曲, Wakare no kyoku); 6. "Ave Maria" (アヴェ·マリア, Ave Maria)
Secluded in an unknown mountain range, around hundred children are raised to become wilderness survival experts. Being carefully genetically chosen and undergoing strict training every day, they are supposed to become the new hope for humanity in the future. Not knowing the truth, everyone gives his best to become one of the candidates for the final test.
8	April 26, 2006	978-4-09-130425-4
Hail of Corn Chapter: 7. "The Blue Danube" (美しき青きドナウ, Utsukushiki aoki Danau); 8. "Moonlight Sonata" (月光, Gekkō); 9. "A Maiden's Prayer" (乙女の祈り, Otome no inori); 10. "Mars, the Bringer of War" (組曲「惑星」より 火星, Kumikyoku "Wakusei" yori: Kasei); 11. "Jupiter, the Bringer of Jollity" (組曲「惑星」より 木星, Kumikyoku "Wakusei" yori: Mokusei)
The final test turns out to be a cruel exam of the participating children's survival skills. Abandoned in the mountains during winter, the candidates have to fight for their place among Team Summer A, for only the "Chosen Seven" will be allowed to live.
9	September 26, 2006	978-4-09-130599-2
Hail of Corn Chapter: 12. "Carnival of the Animals" (動物の謝肉祭, Dōbutsu no Janikusai); 13. "Nomadic Tribe" (流浪の民, Rurō no tami); 14. "Pictures at an Exhibition No.1: Gnomus" (組曲「展覧会の絵」より 小人, Kumikyoku "Tenrankai no e" yori: Gunōmu); 15. "From the New World – Going Home" (「新世界」より 家路, "Shinsekai yori": Ieji); Ash Chapter (灰の章, Hai no shō): 1. "That Place" (その場所, Sono basho)
As the numbers of Summer A candidates rapidly shrink, Ango, Ryo and Shigeru find themselves in a deep cave. All three are from the same two classes and they know that only one member per class will be allowed to survive and make it to the future.
10	March 26, 2007	978-4-09-131003-3
Ash Chapter: 2. "Water-weed" (水草の如く, Suisō no gotoku); 3. "Forests Are Living" (森は生きている, Mori wa ikite iru); 4. "The Door into Summer" (夏への扉, Natsu e no tobira); 5. "The Strait Gate" (狭き門, Semakimon); 6. "A Christmas Carol" (クリスマスキャロル, Kurisumasu Kyaroru)
Hana and her friends stumble across an underground shelter called Ryugu and find a diary left behind by one of the former residents. They learn about the fate of several thousands of people who are forced to witness the doom of their entire world. Yet, they started out anew, full of hope, not knowing which cruel fate awaited them.
11	August 24, 2007	978-4-09-131193-1
Ash Chapter: 7. "On the Beach" (渚にて, Nagisa ni te); 8. "Wuthering Heights" (嵐が丘, Arashi ga oka); 9. "And Then There Were None" (そして誰もいなくなった, Soshite daremo inakunatta); 10. "The Chain" (連鎖, Rensa); 11. "Circulate" (循環, Junkan)
Not knowing about the events which led to the Ryugu Shelter's demise, the leaders of Team Autumn are exploring the facilities and prepare to open the "door of death". Hana and her group desperately chase after them to prevent humanity's final doom while the entire shelter is falling apart above them.
12	January 25, 2008	978-4-09-131477-2
Ash Chapter: 12. "Gathering" (円居, Madoi); Summer Solstice Chapter (夏至の章, Geshi no shō): 1. "Acquire" (拾う, Hirou); 2. "Feel" (感じる, Kanjiru); 3. "Confuse" (惑う, Madou); 4. "Miss" (想う, Omou)
Due to the tragic events unfolding during their first encounter with Team Summer A, Hana, Aramaki and the rest of Team Autumn decide to reconcile with each other and return to the base of Team Spring. Meanwhile, Arashi, Natsu and Semimaru recklessly set sail and come across a girl whose intentions are unknown. She warns them that the rest of their teammates are on the brink of death.
13	July 10, 2008	978-4-09-131690-5
Summer Solstice Chapter: 5. "Pick Up" (拾う, Hirou); 6. "Ask" (問う, Tou); 7. "Find" (見付ける, Mitsukeru); 8. "Target" (狙う, Nerau); 9. "Fly" (飛ぶ, Tobu)
Hana's group returns to the base of Team Spring only to find it completely destroyed by a landslide and all her friends gone. They soon discover that Momotaro has been captured by Team Summer A. Both groups are furious and about to fight each other when a third, even more powerful enemy appears, ready to kill them all.
14	January 9, 2009	978-4-09-132250-0
Summer Solstice Chapter: 10. "Fall" (落ちる, Ochiru); 11. "Tell" (話す, Hanasu); 12. "Know" (知る, Shiru); 13. "Resent" (恨む, Uramu); 14. "Strain" (歪む, Yugamu)
Forced by the circumstances, Team Summer A and Hana's group decide to live together. While friction remains between them, the first signs of understanding emerge. But then, Ango finds out about Hana's secret and falls into a state of deep rage.
15	April 10, 2009	978-4-09-132516-7
Summer Solstice Chapter: 15. "Understand" (解る, Wakaru); 16. "Thirst" (渇く, Kawaku); 17. "Protect" (守る, Mamoru); 18. "Love" (愛する, Aisuru); 19. "Trap" (陥る, Ochiiru)
Shaken by the truth about Hana, the whole team Summer A is furious. Relations between Ango and Hana worsen, until it comes to the catastrophe.
16	September 10, 2009	978-4-09-132628-7
Summer Solstice Chapter: 20. "Convey" (伝える, Tsutaeru); 21. "Lose" (失う, Ushinau); 22. "Divide" (分かれる, Wakareru); 23. "Farewell" (別れる, Wakareru); Minor Heat Chapter (小暑の章, Shōsho no shō): 1. "Strangers" (異邦人, Ihoujin); Extra Chapter (番外編): 1. "Wish" (願い, Negai)
Searching for Hana, who got lost in the caves, her friends plunge further into the deep and cold darkness. The tragic events unfolding lay an unbearable strain on the little community. The volume includes a short side story called "Wish".
17	February 10, 2010	9784091330994
Minor Heat Chapter: 2. "Sindbad of the Beach" (渚のシンドバッド, Nagisa no Shinbaddo); 3. "Dancin' All Night" (ダンシング・オールナイト, Danshingu Ōru Naito); 4. "Look Up At The Stars In The Night" (見上げてごらん夜の星を, Miagete goran yoru no hoshi o); 5. "A Good Day For Departure" (いい日旅立ち, Ii hi tabidachi); 6. "Lose One's Way" (迷い道, Mayoi michi)
Exiled from their community, Ango and Ryo stumble across the peaceful lifestyle of Team Summer B. Hiding their bloody past, they are welcomed warmly by the cheerful group. Albeit baffled about Summer B's carefree way of doing things, they start settling in, but the peace is broken once Ango learns about Arashi's relationship to Hana.
18	August 10, 2010	9784091333162
Minor Heat Chapter: 7. "Someone in the Wind" (だれかが風の中で, Dareka ga kaze no naka de); 8. "Between the Sky and You" (空と君のあいだに, Sora to kimi no aida ni); 9. "Broken Radio" (壊れかけたのRadio, Kowarekaketa no radio); 10. "Doll's House" (人形の家, Ningyō no ie); 11. "Bewitched" (魅せられて, Miserarete)
Separated from Arashi, Team Summer B and the two leaders of Summer A stumble across a mysterious ghost ship. It seems to carry a lot of secrets of the past and lures in the wanderers, but it is also fraught with danger.
19	February 10, 2011	9784091336491
Minor Heat Chapter: 12. "The Passage of Time" (時の過ぎ行くままに, Toki no sugiiku mama ni); 13. "365 Step March" (三百六十五歩のマーチ, Sanbyakurokujūgo ho no māchi); 14. "The Time of Rainbow and Sneakers" (虹とスニーカーの頃, Niji to sunīkā no goro); 15. "Love and Pain and Reassurance" (恋しさとせつなさと心強さと, Itoshisa to Setsunasa to Kokorodzuyosa to); 16. "Sprout" (芽生え, Mebae)
While the separated groups gradually explore the ghost ship, Ango and Ryo are being forced to altercate with their cruel past bit by bit. Finally, Ango breaks down at the worst time imaginable because the ship holds a deadly threat to the entire country of Japan – and they awoke it.
20	July 8, 2011	9784091340184
Minor Heat Chapter: 17. "Give Me Wings" (翼をください, Tsubasa o Kudasai); 18. "Pride"; 19. "Sailor's Song" (舟歌, Funauta)); 20. "Do As You Please" (勝手にしやがれ, Kattenishiyagare); 21. "Youngsters" (若者たち, Wakamonotachi)
Struggling to prevent a catastrophe, the rag-tag band has to deal with yet another menace – a mysterious presence that lurks in the ship and bares its fangs at them, forcing Arashi and Natsu into a dead end.
21	December 9, 2011	9784091341181
Minor Heat Chapter: 22. "Applause" (喝采, Kassai); 23. Can You Celebrate?; Interlude Chapter (幕間, Makuai): 1. "Moonlight" (月明かり, Tsukiakari); Awakening Insects Chapter (啓蟄の章, Keichitsu no shō): 1. "Lone Journey" (独り旅, Hitoritabi); 2. "Grace" (恵み, Megumi)
Scattered throughout all of Japan, the groups from the Seven Seeds Project are all giving their best to survive despite the adversities thrown at them. Slowly, they are settling in with their new world, but the mysterious Mozu is watching them from the shadows like a deadly predator.
22	June 8, 2012	9784091344700
Awakening Insects Chapter: 3. "Victual" (糧); 4. "Feast" (御馳走); 5. "Omen" (予兆); 6. "Warning" (警告); 7. "Progress" (進行)
Despite all odds, Hana managed to survive Team Summer A's assassination attempts and reunited with two painfully missed friends. Meanwhile, Aramaki and Ayu get closer to each other as they travel searching Hana. Will they find her in time before she has to face her most dangerous enemy so far: Evolution itself...?
23	November 9, 2012	9784091347923
Awakening Insects Chapter: 8. "Acceleration" (加速, Kazoku); 9. "Onrush" (奔流, Honryuu); 10. "Backflow" (逆流, Gyakuryuu); 11. "Counterbalance" (相殺, Sōsai); 12. "Aftereffect" (波及, Hakyuu)
—	December 9, 2011	9784091342577
7 Seeds Fanbook: Edge of Emotions (7SEEDS 公式ファンブック ─Edge of Emotions─)
This fanbook contains pictures drawn by the author, Yumi Tamura, as well as an interview with her and a poll among the 7 Seeds fans. It also has detailed information on the teams, the Fuji, and the future Japan.
24	March 8, 2013	978-4-09-135073-2
Awakening Insects Chapter: 13. "Guidance" (導き, Michibiki); 14. "Synchro" (シンクロ, Shinkuro); 15. "Entrance" (入り口, Iriguchi); Sea Chapter (海の章, Umi no shō): 1. "Who" (誰か, Dareka); 2. "Why" (なぜ, Naze)
25	July 10, 2013	978-4-09-135464-8
Sea Chapter: 3. "What" (何が, Naniga); 4. "How" (どうやって, Douyatte); 5. "Where" (どこで, Dokode); 6. "When" (いつ, Itsu); 7. OSP
26	January 10, 2014	978-4-09-135580-5
Sea Chapter: 8. "Heart" (ハート); 9. "With" (ウイズ); 10. "Sight" (サイト); 11. "Fight" (フアイト); Mountains Chapter (山の章, Yama no shō): 1. "The Two Sados" (二つの佐渡, Futatsunosado)
27	July 10, 2014	978-4-09-136239-1
Mountains Chapter: 2. "Contact" (接触, Contakuto); 3. "Hope" (光明, Kōmyō); 4. "Several Insights" (それぞれの, Sorezoreno); 5. "Individual Cases" (それぞれが, Sorezorega); 6. "On"
28	December 10, 2014	978-4-09-136419-7
Mountains Chapter: 7. "Temptation" (誘い, Izanai); 8. "The Good Old Days" (よりよき日々, Yoriyokihibi); 9. "Choice" (選択, Sentaku); 10. "Connection" (結ぶ, Musubu); 11. "Regeneration" (再生, Saisei)
29	May 8, 2015	978-4-09-137299-4
Mountains Chapter: 12. "Resonance" (共鳴, Kyōmei); 13. "Pursuit" (追跡, Tsuiseki); 14. "Afterglow" (残照, Sanshō); 15. "Underground Constellation" (地下の星座, Chikanoseiza); 16. "Impression" (印象, Inshō)
30	October 9, 2015	978-4-09-137768-5
Mountains Chapter: 17. "Confrontation" (対峙, Taiji); 18. "The Ark" (方舟, Hakobune); 19. "The Three of Them" (3人, Sannin); 20. "Observation" (観察, Kansatsu); 21. "Goals" (ゴール, Gouru)
31	March 10, 2016	978-4-09-138237-5
Mountains Chapter: 22. "Level One" (レベル1, Reberuichi); 23. "The Way Home/Return Trip" (帰りの道, Kaerinomichi); 24. "Birthplace/Hometown" (ふるさと, Furusato); 25. "The Trial" (審判, Shinpon); 26. "The Trial 2" (新本2, Shinponni)
32	August 10, 2016	978-4-09-138629-8
Mountains Chapter: 27. "Reunion" (再会, Saikai); 28. "Nagomi" (和み, Nagomi); Sky Chapter (空の章, Sora no shō): 1. "Penetrating Cold" (底冷え, Sokobie); 2. "Entrustment" (託すもの, Takusumono); 3. "Move" (動く, Ugoku)
33	January 10, 2017	978-4-09-138894-0
Sky Chapter: 4. "Resolution" (覚悟, Kakugo); 5. "Opening" (隙間, Sukima); 6. "Death" (死地, Shichi); 7. "Life/Existence" (生命, Inochi); 8. "The Ark" (方舟, Hakobune)
34	June 9, 2017	978-4-09-139308-1
Sky Chapter: 9. "Tag" (タッグ, Taggu); 10. "Reality" (本質, Honshitsu); 11. "Failure" (蹉跌, Satetsu); 12. "Courage" (勇気, Yuuki); Final Chapter (最終章, Sai shūshō): 1. "From A Moonless Dawn" (暁闇から, Akatsukiyamikara)
35	August 10, 2017	978-4-09-139424-8
Final Chapter: 2. "Go Beyond The Limits" (絶域をゆく, Zetsuiki o yuku); Last Part/Final Episode (最終回): 1. "Today and Tomorrow" (今日、そして明日, Kyōsoshiteasu)
