= 1934 Nobel Prize in Literature =

- Luigi Pirandello
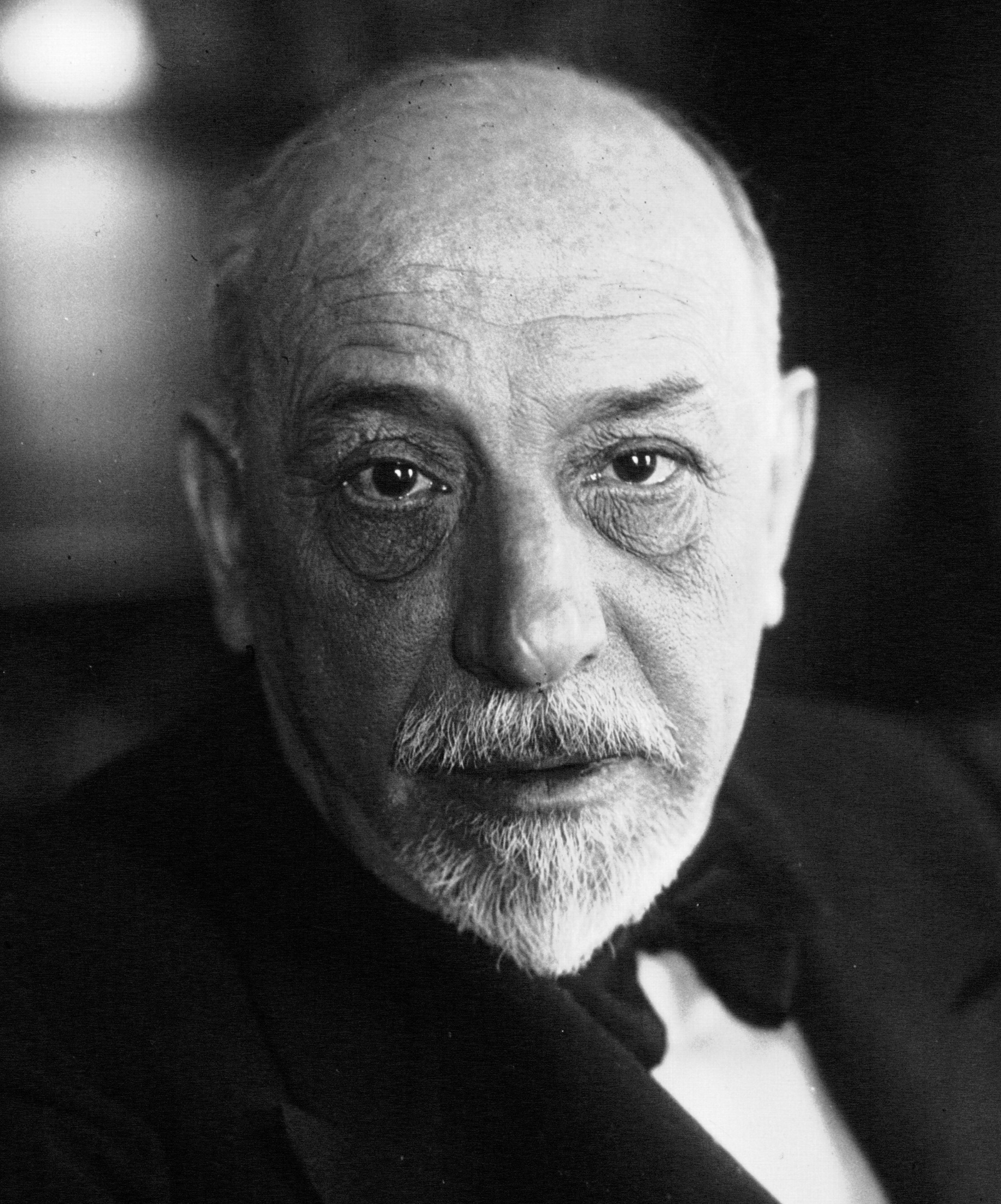
- "for his bold and ingenious revival of dramatic and scenic art."
- Date: 8 November 1934 (announcement); 10 December 1934 (ceremony)
- Location: Stockholm, Sweden
- Presented by: Swedish Academy
- First award: 1901
- Website: Official website

The 1934 Nobel Prize in Literature was awarded to the Italian dramatist Luigi Pirandello (1867–1936) "for his bold and ingenious revival of dramatic and scenic art". He is the third Italian recipient of the said prize.

== Laureate ==
Luigi Pirandello was an Italian playwright, prose writer and poet. Pirandello wrote more than 100 short stories, 40 plays and seven novels, including The Late Mattia Pascal (1904). Regarded as a major figure in 20th-century theatre, his plays explore psychology, the ego and identity issues and paved the way for absurd theatre in the 1950s. Pirandello's first major play Right You Are (if You Think You Are) (1917) explored his lifelong subject of the relativity of truth. In the experimental metaplay Six Characters in Search of an Author (1921) Pirandello contrasted art and life. It was followed by the tragedy Henry IV (1922). Other plays include Each in His Own Way (1924) and Tonight We Improvise (1930).

== Nominations ==
Luigi Pirandello had not been nominated for the prize before 1934, making it one of the rare occasions when an author have been awarded the Nobel Prize in Literature the same year they were first nominated. He was nominated only by 1909 Nobel laureate in Physics Guglielmo Marconi (1874–1937), who serves as the President of Arts Class at the Royal Academy of Italy.

Other nominated authors in 1934 included António Correia de Oliveira, Eugene O'Neill (awarded in 1936), Roger Martin du Gard (awarded in 1937), Frans Eemil Sillanpää (awarded in 1939), Johannes V. Jensen (awarded in 1944), Karel Capek, Kostis Palamas, Ramón Menéndez Pidal, Francisco García Calderón, Maria Madalena de Martel Patrício, Olav Duun and Upton Sinclair.

The authors Mary Hunter Austin, Hermann Bahr, Safvet-beg Bašagić, Andrei Bely, Gheorghe Bogdan-Duică, Edward Bullough, Roger Fry, John Gray, Thomas Anstey Guthrie, Julian Hawthorne, Naitō Konan, Gustave Lanson, Julia Lopes de Almeida, Ferenc Móra, Erich Mühsam, Arthur Wing Pinero, Thorne Smith, Jakob Wassermann, Brand Whitlock and Paul Zarifopol died in 1934 without having been nominated for the prize.

Official list of nominees and their nominators for the prize
No.	Nominee	Country	Nominator(s)	Country
1	Joseph Bédier (1864–1938)	France	Henrik Schück (1855–1947)	Sweden
2	Hayim Nahman Bialik (1873–1934)	Russia; Israel	Joseph Klausner (1874–1958)	Lithuania; Israel
3	António Correia de Oliveira (1878–1960)	Portugal	Hjalmar Hammarskjöld (1862–1953)	Sweden
3	António Correia de Oliveira (1878–1960)	Portugal	Alberto de Oliveira (1857–1937)	Brazil
3	António Correia de Oliveira (1878–1960)	Portugal	Agostinho de Campos (1870–1944)	Portugal
3	António Correia de Oliveira (1878–1960)	Portugal	Alfredo da Cunha (1863–1942)	Portugal
3	António Correia de Oliveira (1878–1960)	Portugal	Luís da Cunha Gonçalves (1875–1956)	Portugal
4	Karel Čapek (1890–1938)	Czechoslovakia	several professors	Czechoslovakia
5	Maria Madalena de Martel Patrício (1884–1947)	Portugal	António Pereira Forjaz (1893–1972)	Portugal
5	Maria Madalena de Martel Patrício (1884–1947)	Portugal	Bento Carqueja (1860–1935)	Portugal
6	Olav Duun (1876–1939)	Norway	Jens Thiis (1870–1942)	Norway
6	Olav Duun (1876–1939)	Norway	Halvdan Koht (1873–1965)	Norway
6	Olav Duun (1876–1939)	Norway	Helga Eng (1875–1966)	Norway
7	Manuel Gálvez (1882–1962)	Argentina	Leopoldo Díaz (1862–1947)	Argentina
8	Francisco García Calderón Rey (1883–1953) (Note: Francisco and Ventura García Calderón are brothers jointly nominated by for the prize.)	Peru	49 members of the Peruvian Society of Authors (Note: A large number of nominations were made to nominated the García brothers by prominent people and authors (whose eligibility to make nominations was indeterminable) in Lima, Peru.)	Peru
8	Francisco García Calderón Rey (1883–1953)	Peru	Louis Bertrand (1866–1941) (Note: 15 nominations were made to nominated the García brothers by Latino-American authors living in France and French authors with interests and functions related to Hispanic-American Literature (écrivains Latino-Américains résidant en France et écrivains français rattachés par leurs sympathies et leurs fonctions aux lettres hispano-américaines). L. Bertrand and G. Dumas are included in the 15 nominations.)	France
9	Ventura García Calderón (1886–1959)	Peru	Georges Dumas (1866–1946)	France
9	Ventura García Calderón (1886–1959)	Peru	13 professors	France
10	Franz Karl Ginzkey (1871–1963)	Austria	Austrian Academy of Sciences (Note: Several other literary societies in Vienna, Austria.)	Austria
11	Bertel Gripenberg (1878–1947)	Finland; Sweden	Verner von Heidenstam (1859–1940) (Note: Verner von Heidenstam suggests that the Prize be awarded with one half to either B. Gripenberg or J. Hemmer, and the other half to F. Sillanpää.)	Sweden
12	Ole Hallesby (1879–1961)	Norway	Olai Skulerud (1881–1963) (Note: E. Sundberg was O. Skulerud's second choice, if O. Hallesby was not eligible as a candidate.)	Norway
13	Jarl Hemmer (1893–1944)	Finland	Verner von Heidenstam (1859–1940)	Sweden
14	Hans Henrik Holm (1896–1980)	Norway	Alexander Seippel (1851–1938)	Norway
15	Johannes Vilhelm Jensen (1873–1950)	Denmark	Johannes Brøndum-Nielsen (1881–1977)	Denmark
16	Erwin Guido Kolbenheyer (1878–1962)	Austria	Austrian Academy of Sciences (Note: E. Kolbenheyer was also nominated by professors from the University in Vienna, Austria, several of whom were eligible to make a nomination, based on the area of their professorships.)	Austria
17	Roger Martin du Gard (1881–1958)	France	Torsten Fogelqvist (1880–1941)	Sweden
18	Ramón Menéndez Pidal (1869–1968)	Spain	Per Hallström (1866–1960)	Sweden
19	Dmitry Merezhkovsky (1865–1941)	Russia	Sigurd Agrell (1881–1937)	Sweden
20	Eugene O'Neill (1888–1953)	United States	Martin Lamm (1880–1950)	Sweden
21	Kostis Palamas (1859–1943)	Greece	Frederik Poulsen (1876–1950)	Denmark
21	Kostis Palamas (1859–1943)	Greece	Harry Fett (1875–1962)	Norway
22	Luigi Pirandello (1867–1936)	Italy	Guglielmo Marconi (1874–1937)	Italy
23	Ramón Pérez de Ayala (1880–1962)	Spain	professors of Spanish literature (Note: Professors of Spanish literature at universities in London, Dublin, Paris and the universities of Cambridge and Oxford.)	England; France; Ireland
23	Ramón Pérez de Ayala (1880–1962)	Spain	Ramón Menéndez Pidal (1869–1968)	Spain
24	Sarvepalli Radhakrishnan (1888–1975)	India	Hjalmar Hammarskjöld (1862–1953)	Sweden
25	Edwin Arlington Robinson (1869–1935)	United States	Hjalmar Hammarskjöld (1862–1953)	Sweden
26	Ernest Roguin (1851–1939)	Switzerland	Edmond Rossier (1865–1945)	Switzerland
27	Jean Schlumberger (1877–1968)	France	Torsten Fogelqvist (1880–1941)	Sweden
28	Frans Eemil Sillanpää (1888–1964)	Finland	Torsten Evert Karsten (1870–1942)	Finland
28	Frans Eemil Sillanpää (1888–1964)	Finland	Yrjö Hirn (1870–1952)	Finland
28	Frans Eemil Sillanpää (1888–1964)	Finland	Eemil Nestor Setälä (1864–1935)	Finland
28	Frans Eemil Sillanpää (1888–1964)	Finland	Rafael Erich (1879–1946)	Finland
28	Frans Eemil Sillanpää (1888–1964)	Finland	Verner von Heidenstam (1859–1940)	Sweden
29	Upton Sinclair (1878–1968)	United States	Ferdinand Schiller (1864–1937)	Germany; England
29	Upton Sinclair (1878–1968)	United States	Robert Morss Lovett (1870–1956)	United States
29	Upton Sinclair (1878–1968)	United States	William Ellery Leonard (1876–1944)	United States
29	Upton Sinclair (1878–1968)	United States	Robert Herrick (1868–1938) (Note: The nominations from previous years (1932, 1933) were renewed. 800 nominations from all over the world were collected and sent together, by Ernest S. Greene (1864–1936), secretary of a committee in New York City. Among the nominators were members of the French and Spanish Academies, and professors (eligible to nominate) from several universities.)	United States
30	Hermann Stehr (1864–1940)	Nazi Germany	Hermann August Korff (1882–1963)	Nazi Germany
31	Ewald Sundberg (1886–1967)	Norway	Olai Skulerud (1881–1963)	Norway
32	Tadeusz Zieliński (1859–1944)	Poland	6 professors at University of Warsaw	Poland

== Prize decision ==
In their report to the Swedish Academy dated 27 September 1934, four members of the Nobel committee recommended that the 1934 Nobel Prize in Literature should be awarded to Luigi Pirandello, particularly noting his plays as "a notable and independent attempt to renew the world of the stage" with "about half a dozen, from one point of view or another, remarkable, often ingenious works." The fifth committee member Henrik Schück disagreed and stated in a separate report: "I readily admit that Pirandello possesses considerable dramatic talent and a great facility for poetry, and that his plays possess something of the freshness of the literary sketch. But for my part, I cannot give him a higher rank than that of a skilled faiseur, whose plays may well reap a certain success on the stage for the moment, when they are new, but which will be forgotten quite soon, for the content of ideas is very meager, and purely poetically speaking, he is in my opinion not an author of the standards that the Nobel Foundation's statutes apparently intend." Schück instead proposed the American playwright Eugene O'Neill, who was subsequently awarded the 1936 Nobel Prize in Literature.

On 8 November 1934 the Swedish Academy decided that that year's Nobel Prize in Literature should be awarded to Luige Pirandello "for his bold and ingenious revival of dramatic and scenic art".

== Award ceremony speech ==
At the award ceremony on 10 December 1934, Per Hallström, permanent secretary of the Swedish Academy said:

"The most remarkable feature of Pirandello’s art is his almost magical power to turn psychological analysis into good theatre. Usually the theatre requires human stereotypes; here the spirit is like a shadow, obscurity behind obscurity, and one cannot decide what is more or less central inside. Finally one racks his brains, for there is no centre. Everything is relative, nothing can be grasped completely, and yet the plays can sometimes seize, captivate, and charm even the great international public. This result is wholly paradoxical. As the author himself explained, it depends on the fact that his works «arise out of images taken from life which have passed through a filter of ideas and which hold me completely captive». It is the image which is fundamental, not, as many have believed, the abstract idea disguised afterwards by an image."
