= Cuverville, Seine-Maritime =

Cuverville
- Commune
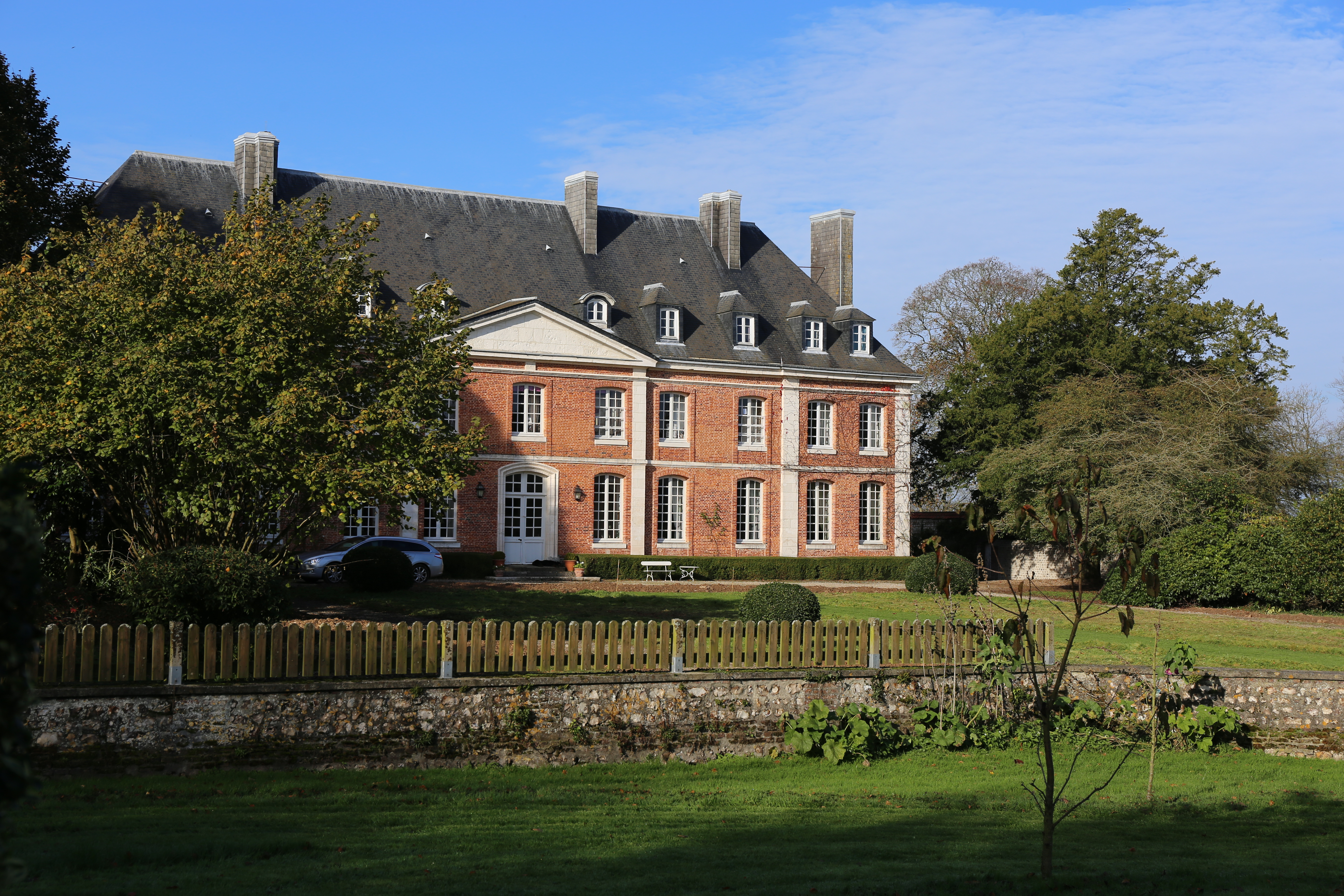
- The chateau in Cuverville

- Coat of arms
- Location of Cuverville
- Location within France Location within Normandy
- Coordinates: 49°39′52″N 0°15′48″E
- Country: France
- Region: Normandy
- Department: Seine-Maritime
- Arrondissement: Le Havre
- Canton: Octeville-sur-Mer
- Intercommunality: Le Havre Seine Métropole
- Area^{1}: 4.58 km^{2} (1.77 sq mi)
- Elevation: 99 m (325 ft)
- Highest elevation: 130 m (430 ft)
- Lowest elevation: 32 m (105 ft)
- Population (2023): 341
  - Density: 74.5/km^{2} (193/sq mi)
- Time zone: UTC+01:00 (CET)
  - Summer (DST): UTC+02:00 (CEST)
- INSEE/Postal code: 76206 /76280
- ^{1} French Land Register data, which excludes lakes, ponds, glaciers > 1 km^{2} (0.386 sq mi or 247 acres) and river estuaries.

Cuverville (French pronunciation: [kyvɛʁvil]) is a commune in the Seine-Maritime department in the Normandy region in northern France.

== Geography ==
A small farming village situated in the Pays de Caux, some 13 miles (21 km) northeast of Le Havre, on the D239 road.

== Population ==
Historical population
Year	Pop.	±% p.a.
1968	169	—
1975	148	−1.88%
1982	187	+3.40%
1990	231	+2.68%
1999	292	+2.64%
2007	325	+1.35%
2012	360	+2.07%
2017	351	−0.51%
2023	341	−0.48%
Source: INSEE

== Places of interest ==
- The church of Notre-Dame, dating from the sixteenth century.
- An eighteenth century chateau.
- Remains of a feudal castle.

== Notable people ==
- André Gide is buried here.

== See also ==
- Communes of the Seine-Maritime department
