= Ricardo Rojas (writer) =

Argentine writer, educator (1882–1957)

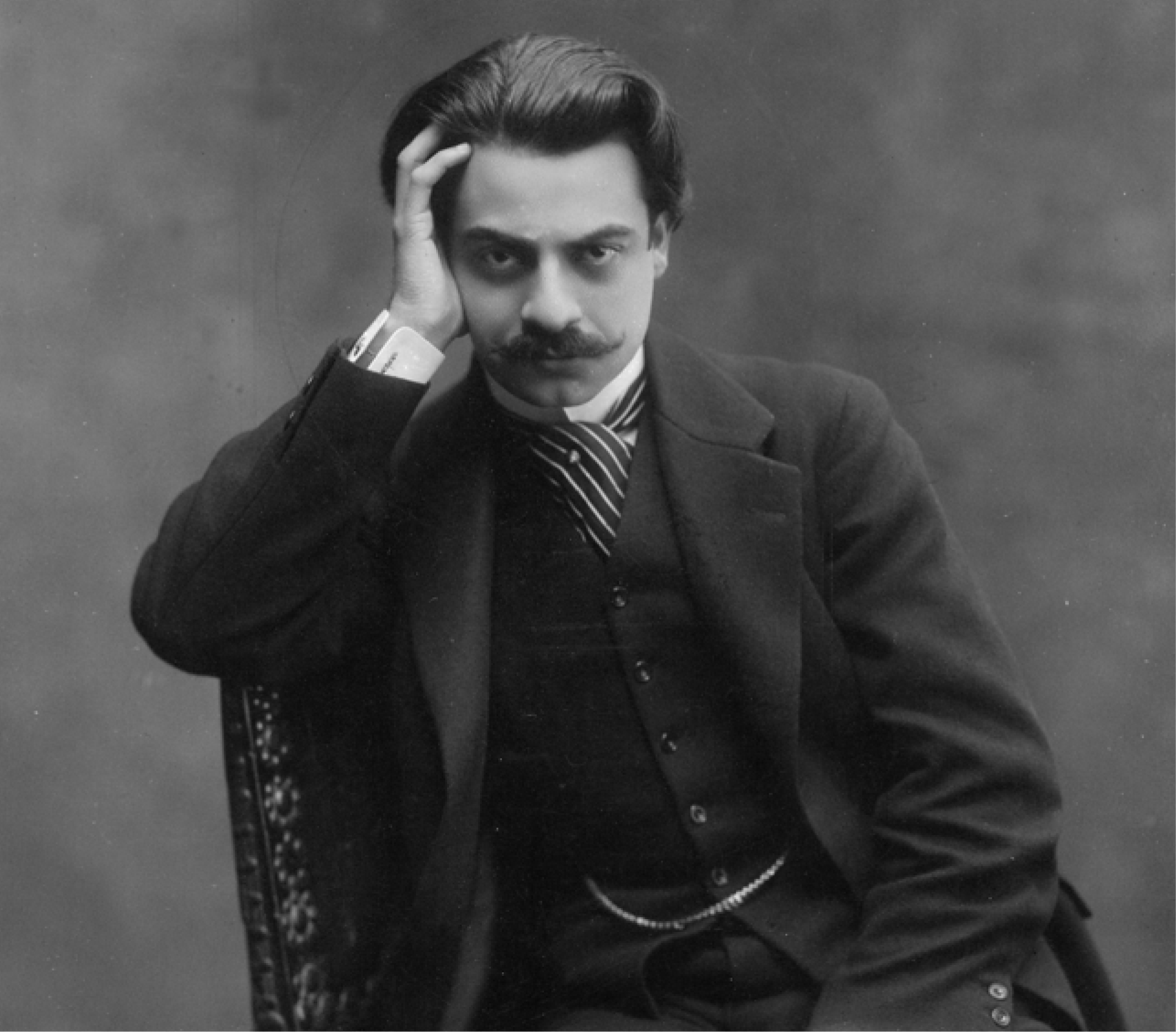
Ricardo Rojas in 1926

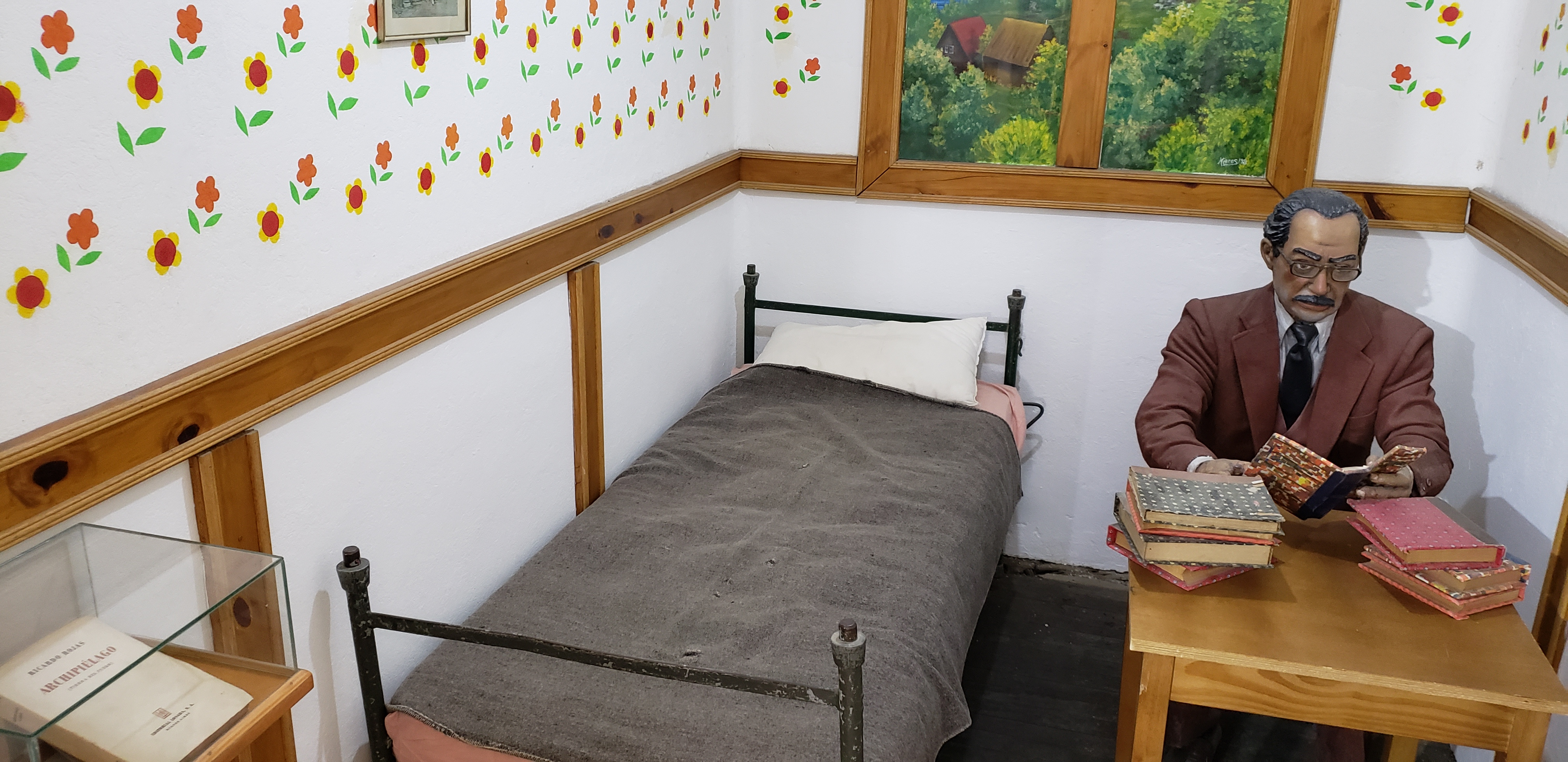
Ricardo Rojas cell, Ushuaia Prison (in Ushuaia), Museo Maritimo y del Presidio de Ushuaia

Ricardo Rojas (16 September 1882, in San Miguel de Tucumán – 29 July 1957, in Buenos Aires) was an Argentine writer, including journalist, and educator.

== Biography ==
Rojas came from one of the most influential families of the Santiago del Estero Province; his father was Absalón Rojas, who was governor of the province.

He moved to Buenos Aires to further his education, later becoming rector of the University of Buenos Aires from 1926 to 1930. He was also the director of the Institute of Petroleum (see Yacimientos Petrolíferos Fiscales).

=== Works ===
- Victoria del Hombre (1903)
- El país de la Selva (1907)
- Cartas de Europa (1908)
- El Alma Española (1908)
- Cosmópolis (1908)
- La Restauración Nacionalista (1909)
- Bibliografía de Sarmiento (1911)
- Los Lises del Blasón (1911)
- Blasón de Plata (1912)
- Archivo Capitular de Jujuy (1913/1944)
- La Universidad de Tucumán (1915)
- La Argentinidad (1916)
- Poesías de Cervantes (1916)
- Historia de la literatura argentina, 8 volumes
- Los Arquetipos (1922)
- Poesías (1923)
- Facultad de Filosofía y Letras (1924)
- Discursos (1924)
- Eurindia (1924)
- La Guerra de las Naciones (1924)
- Las Provincias (1927)
- El Cristo Invisible (1927)
- Elelín (1929)
- Discursos del Rector (1930)
- Silabario de la Decoración Americana (1930)
- La Historia de las Escuelas (1930)
- Memoria del Rector (1930)
- El Radicalismo de Mañana (1932)
- El Santo de la Espada (1933)
- Cervantes (1935)
- Retablo Español (1938)
- Un Titán de los Andes (1939)
- Ollantay (1939)
- El Pensamiento vivo de Sarmiento (1941)
- Archipiélago (1942)
- La Salamanca (1943)
- El Profeta de la Pampa (1945)
- La Entrevista de Guayaquil (1947)
- La Victoria del Hombre y otros cantos (1951)
- Ensayo de crítica histórica sobre Episodios de la vida internacional Argentina (1951)
- Oda Latina (1954)
