= Boris Gorbatov =

Russian Soviet writer and screenwriter, journalist, war correspondent (1908–1954)

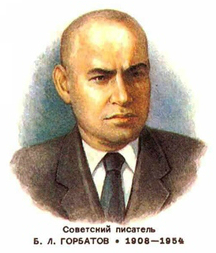
- Born: 2 July 1908
- Died: 2 January 1954 (aged 45)

Boris Gorbatov (1908–1954) was a Soviet novelist. Born in the Donbas region in Ukraine, he moved to Moscow at the age of 18 and joined the Communist Party in 1930. He was a military correspondent during World War Two.

== Legacy ==
Gorbatov is best known for his novels Donbass and Taras' Family, both of which were translated into English, the latter also into French and German. The latter novel was filmed in 1945 (see The Unvanquished) and was the first film depicting The Holocaust.

== Awards ==
He was a recipient of the Stalin Prize.

== Personal life ==
He was married to the actress Tatiana Okunevskaya and then the actress Nina Arkhipova. He died in 1954 and is buried in Novodevichy Cemetery.
