= André Gide =

French author and Nobel laureate (1869–1951)

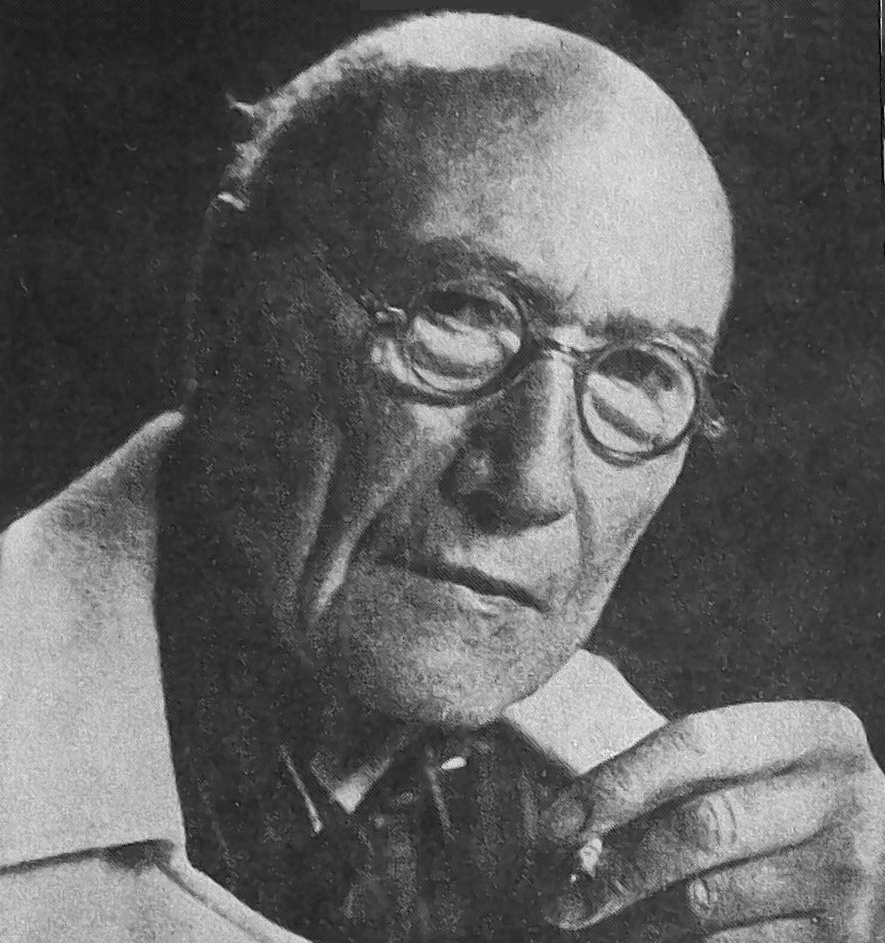
- Born: André Paul Guillaume Gide; 22 November 1869; Paris, French Empire
- Died: 19 February 1951 (aged 81); Paris, France
- Resting place: Cimetière de Cuverville, Cuverville, Seine-Maritime
- Education: Lycée Henri-IV
- Occupations: Novelist; essayist; dramatist
- Spouse: Madeleine Rondeaux (m. 1895; died 1938)
- Children: Catherine Gide
- Writing career
- Notable works: The Immoralist; Strait Is the Gate; Les caves du Vatican (The Vatican Cellars; sometimes published in English under the title Lafcadio's Adventures); The Pastoral Symphony; The Counterfeiters; The Fruits of the Earth
- Notable awards: Nobel Prize in Literature; 1947

André Paul Guillaume Gide (French: [ɑ̃dʁe pɔl ɡijom ʒid]; 22 November 1869 – 19 February 1951) was a French author whose writing spanned a wide variety of styles and topics. He was awarded the 1947 Nobel Prize in Literature. Gide's career ranged from his beginnings in the symbolist movement to criticising imperialism in the interwar period. Author of more than 50 books, he was described in his obituary in The New York Times as "France's greatest contemporary man of letters" and "judged the greatest French writer of this century by the literary cognoscenti."

Known for his fiction as well as his autobiographical works, Gide expressed the conflict and eventual reconciliation of the two sides of his personality (characterized by a Protestant austerity and a transgressive sexual adventurousness). As a self-professed pederast, he used his writing to explore his struggle to be fully oneself, including owning one's sexual nature, without betraying one's values. His political activity was shaped by the same ethos. While sympathetic to Communism in the early 1930s, like many intellectuals, after his 1936 journey to the USSR he supported the anti-Stalinist left. Towards the end of his life, in the 1940s, he shifted towards more traditional values and repudiated Communism as an idea that breaks with the traditions of Christian civilization.

== Early life ==
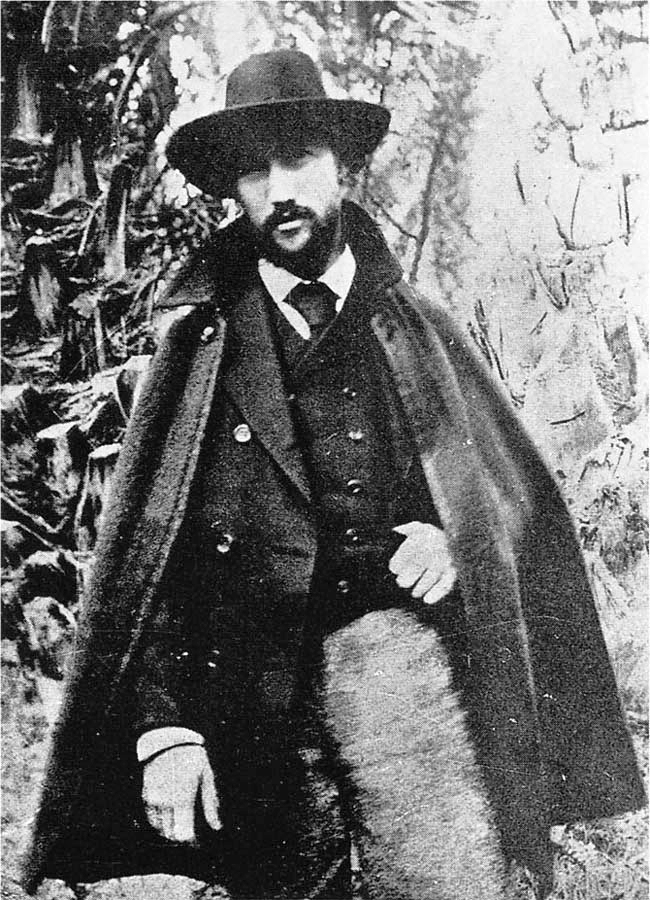
Gide in 1893

Gide was born in Paris on 22 November 1869 into a middle-class Protestant family. His father Jean Paul Guillaume Gide was a professor of law at University of Paris; he died in 1880, when the boy was 11 years old. His mother was Juliette Maria Rondeaux. His uncle was political economist Charles Gide. His paternal family traced its roots to Italy. The ancestral Guidos had moved to France and other western and northern European countries after converting to Protestantism during the 16th century and facing persecution in Catholic Italy.

Gide was brought up in isolated conditions in Normandy. He became a prolific writer at an early age, publishing his first novel, The Notebooks of André Walter (French: Les Cahiers d'André Walter), in 1891, at the age of 21.

In 1893 and 1894, Gide travelled in Northern Africa. There he came to accept his homosexuality.

Gide befriended Irish playwright Oscar Wilde in Paris, where the latter was in exile. In 1895 the two men met in Algiers. Wilde had the mistaken impression that he had introduced Gide to homosexuality, but Gide had already come to terms with his preferences.

== The middle years ==
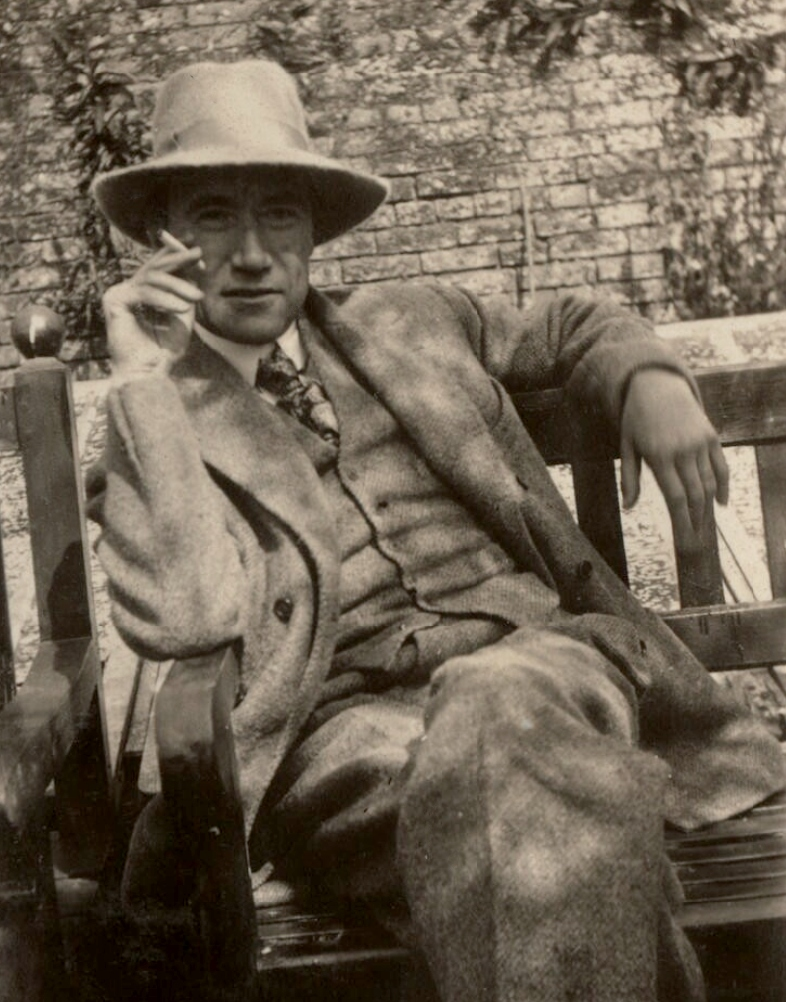
Gide photographed by Ottoline Morrell in 1924.

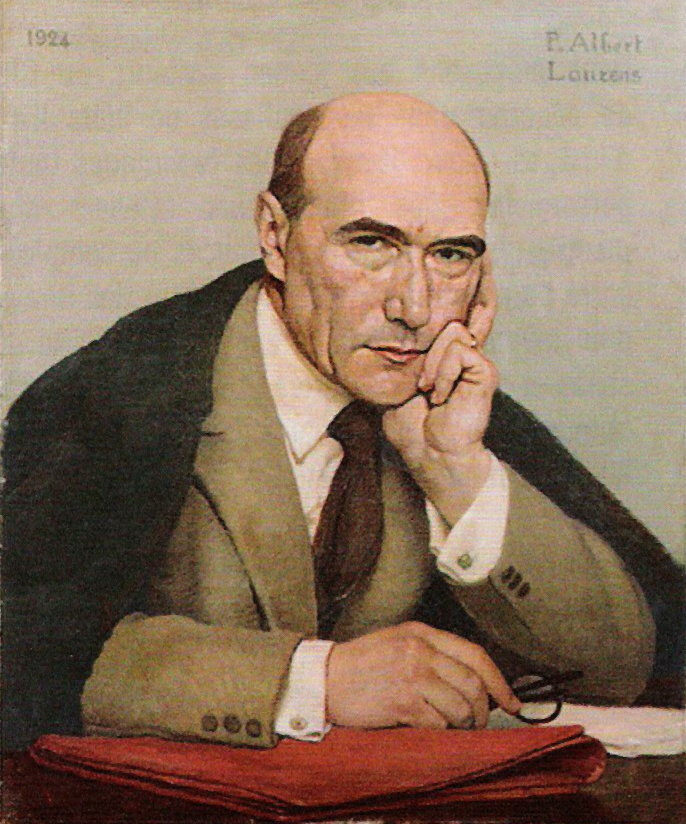
André Gide by Paul Albert Laurens (1924)

In 1895, after his mother's death, Gide married his cousin Madeleine Rondeaux, but the marriage remained unconsummated. In 1896, he was elected mayor of La Roque-Baignard, a commune in Normandy.

Gide spent the summer of 1907 in Jersey, with friends Jacques Copeau and Théo van Rysselberghe and their families. He rented a room in La Valeuse Cottage in St Brelade. Whilst there he worked on the second chapter of Strait Is the Gate (French: La Porte étroite), and van Rysselberghe painted his portrait.

In 1908, Gide helped found the literary magazine Nouvelle Revue Française (The New French Review).

During World War I, Gide visited England. One of his friends there was artist William Rothenstein. Rothenstein described Gide's visit to his Gloucestershire home in his autobiography:

André Gide was in England during the war...He came to stay with us for a time, and brought with him a young nephew, whose English was better than his own. The boy made friends with my son John, while Gide and I discussed everything under the sun. Once again I delighted in the range and subtlety of a Frenchman's intelligence; and I regretted my long severance from France. Nobody understood art more profoundly than Gide, no one's view of life was more penetrating. ...

Gide had a half satanic, half monk-like mien; he put one in mind of portraits of Baudelaire. Withal there was something exotic about him. He would appear in a red waistcoat, black velvet jacket and beige-coloured trousers and, in lieu of collar and tie, a loosely knotted scarf. ...

The heart of man held no secrets for Gide. There was little that he didn't understand, or discuss. He suffered, as I did, from the banishment of truth, one of the distressing symptoms of war. The Germans were not all black, and the Allies all white, for Gide.

In 1916, Gide was about 47 years old when he took Marc Allégret, age 15, as a lover. Marc was one of five children of Élie Allégret and his wife. Gide had become friends with the senior Allégret during his own school years when Gide's mother had hired Allégret as a tutor for her son. Élie Allégret had been best man at Gide's wedding. After Gide fled with Marc to London, his wife Madeleine burned all his correspondence in retaliation—"the best part of myself", Gide later said.

In 1918, Gide met and befriended Dorothy Bussy; they were friends for more than 30 years, and she translated many of his works into English.

Gide also became close friends with the critic Charles Du Bos. Together they were part of the Foyer Franco-Belge, in which capacity they worked to find employment, food and housing for Franco-Belgian refugees who arrived in Paris after the 1914 German invasion of Belgium. Their friendship later declined due to Du Bos's perception that Gide had disavowed or betrayed his spiritual faith, in contrast to Du Bos's own return to faith.

Du Bos's essay Dialogue avec André Gide was published in 1929. The essay, informed by Du Bos's Catholic convictions, condemned Gide's homosexuality. Gide and Du Bos's mutual friend Ernst Robert Curtius criticised the book in a letter to Gide, writing that the fact that Du Bos "judges you according to Catholic morals suffices to neglect his complete indictment. It can only touch those who think like him and are convinced in advance. He has abdicated his intellectual liberty."

In the 1920s, Gide became an inspiration for such writers as Albert Camus and Jean-Paul Sartre. In 1923, he published a book on Fyodor Dostoyevsky. When he defended homosexuality in the public edition of Corydon (1924), he received so much condemnation that he was blocked from being nominated to the Académie Française. He later considered this his most important work.

In 1923, Gide sired a daughter, Catherine, by Elisabeth van Rysselberghe, a much younger woman. He had known her for a long time, as she was the daughter of his friends Maria Monnom and Théo van Rysselberghe, a Belgian neo-impressionist painter. This caused the only crisis in the long-standing relationship between Allégret and Gide, and damaged his friendship with Théo van Rysselberghe. This was possibly Gide's only sexual relationship with a woman, and it was very brief. Catherine was his only descendant by blood. He liked to call Elisabeth "La Dame Blanche" ("The White Lady").

Elisabeth eventually left her husband to move to Paris and manage the practical aspects of Gide's life. They had adjoining apartments in Montparnasse. She worshipped him, but evidently they no longer had a sexual relationship.

In 1924, he published an autobiography, If it Die... (French: Si le grain ne meurt). The same year, he produced the first French-language editions of Joseph Conrad's Heart of Darkness and Lord Jim.

After 1925, Gide began to campaign for more humane conditions for convicted criminals. His legal wife, Madeleine Gide, died in 1938. He explored their marriage in Et nunc manet in te, his memoir of Madeleine, published in English in the United States in 1952.

== Africa ==
From July 1926 to May 1927, Gide traveled through the colony of French Equatorial Africa with his lover Marc Allégret. They went to Middle Congo (now the Republic of the Congo), Ubangi-Shari (now the Central African Republic), briefly to Chad, and then to Cameroon. He kept a journal, which he published as Travels in the Congo (French: Voyage au Congo) and Return from Chad (French: Retour du Tchad).

In this work, he criticized the behavior of French business interests in the Congo and inspired reform. In particular, he strongly criticized the Large Concessions regime (Régime des Grandes Concessions). The government had conceded part of the colony to French companies, allowing them to exploit the area's natural resources, in particular rubber. He related that native workers were forced to leave their village for several weeks to collect rubber in the forest, and compared their exploitation by the companies to slavery. The book contributed to the growing anti-colonialism movements in France and helped thinkers to reevaluate the effects of colonialism in Africa.

== Political views and the Soviet Union ==
During the 1930s, Gide briefly became a Communist, or more precisely, a fellow traveler (he never formally joined any Communist party), but as an individualist himself, he advocated the idea of Communist individualism. Despite supporting the Soviet Union, he acknowledged the political repression there. Gide insisted on the release of Victor Serge, a Soviet writer and a member of the Left Opposition who was prosecuted by the Stalinist regime for his views. As a distinguished writer sympathizing with the cause of Communism, he was invited to speak at Maxim Gorky's funeral and to tour the Soviet Union as a guest of the Soviet Union of Writers. He encountered censorship of his speeches and was particularly disillusioned with the state of culture under Soviet Communism. His work Retour de L'U.R.S.S. (Return from the USSR, 1936) was addressed to pro-Soviet readers, to expose them to doubts instead of presenting harsh criticism. While admitting the economic and social achievements of the USSR compared to the Russian Empire, he noted the decay of culture, the erasure of the individuality of Soviet citizens, and the suppression of any dissent:

Then would it not be better to, instead of playing on words, simply to acknowledge that the revolutionary spirit (or even simply the critical spirit) is no longer the correct thing, that it is not wanted any more? What is wanted now is compliance, conformism. What is desired and demanded is approval of all that is done in the USSR; and an attempt is being made to obtain an approval that is not mere resignation, but a sincere, an enthusiastic approval. What is most astounding is that this attempt is successful. On the other hand the smallest protest, the least criticism, is liable to the severest penalties, and in fact is immediately stifled. And I doubt whether in any other country in the world, even Hitler's Germany, thought to be less free, more bowed down, more fearful (terrorized), more vassalized.

— André Gide Return from the USSR

Gide does not express his attitude towards Stalin, but he describes the signs of his personality cult: "in each [home], ... the same portrait of Stalin, and nothing else"; "portrait of Stalin... , in the same place no doubt where the icon used to be. Is it adoration, love, or fear? I do not know; always and everywhere he is present." But Gide wrote that these problems could be solved by raising the cultural level of Soviet society.

When Gide began preparing his manuscript for publication, the Kremlin was immediately informed about it, and soon Gide was visited by the Soviet author Ilya Ehrenburg, who said that he agreed with Gide, but asked to postpone the publication, as the Soviet Union was aiding the Republicans in the Spanish Civil War. Two days later, Louis Aragon delivered a letter from Jef Last asking to postpone the publication. These efforts failed, and as the book was published, Gide was condemned in the Soviet press and by the "friends of the USSR": Nordahl Grieg wrote that Gide wrote the book out of impatience, and that with it he did a favour for the Fascists, who greeted it with joy. In 1937, in response, Gide published Afterthoughts on the U. S. S. R.; earlier, Gide read Trotsky's The Revolution Betrayed and met Victor Serge, who gave him more information about the Soviet Union. In Afterthoughts, Gide criticises Soviet society more directly: "Citrine, Trotsky, Mercier, Yvon, Victor Serge, Leguay, Rudolf and many others have helped me with their documentation. Everything they have taught me so far I had only suspected—it has confirmed and reinforced my fears". The main points of Afterthoughts were that the dictatorship of the proletariat became the dictatorship of Stalin, and that the privileged bureaucracy became the new ruling class, which profited by the workers' surplus labour, spending the state budget on projects like the Palace of Soviets or to raise its own standards of living, while the working class lived in extreme poverty; Gide cited the official Soviet newspapers to prove his claims.

During World War II, Gide concluded that "absolute liberty destroys the individual and also society unless it be closely linked to tradition and discipline"; he rejected the revolutionary idea of Communism as breaking with traditions, writing, "if civilization depended solely on those who initiated revolutionary theories, then it would perish, since culture needs for its survival a continuous and developing tradition." In Thesee (1946), he showed that an individual may safely leave the Maze only if "he had clung tightly to the thread which linked him with the past". In 1947, he said that although civilizations rise and fall, Christian civilization may be saved from doom "if we accepted the responsibility of the sacred charge laid on us by our traditions and our past." He also said that he remained an individualist and protested against "the submersion of individual responsibility in organized authority, in that escape from freedom which is characteristic of our age."

Gide contributed to the 1949 anthology The God That Failed. He could not write an essay because of his health, so the text was written by Enid Starkie, based on paraphrases of Return from the USSR, Afterthoughts, a discussion in Paris at l'Union pour la Verite in 1935, and his Journal; Gide approved the text.

== 1930s and 1940s ==
In 1930 Gide published a book about the Blanche Monnier case, La Séquestrée de Poitiers, changing little but the protagonists' names. Monnier was a woman kept captive by her mother for more than 25 years.

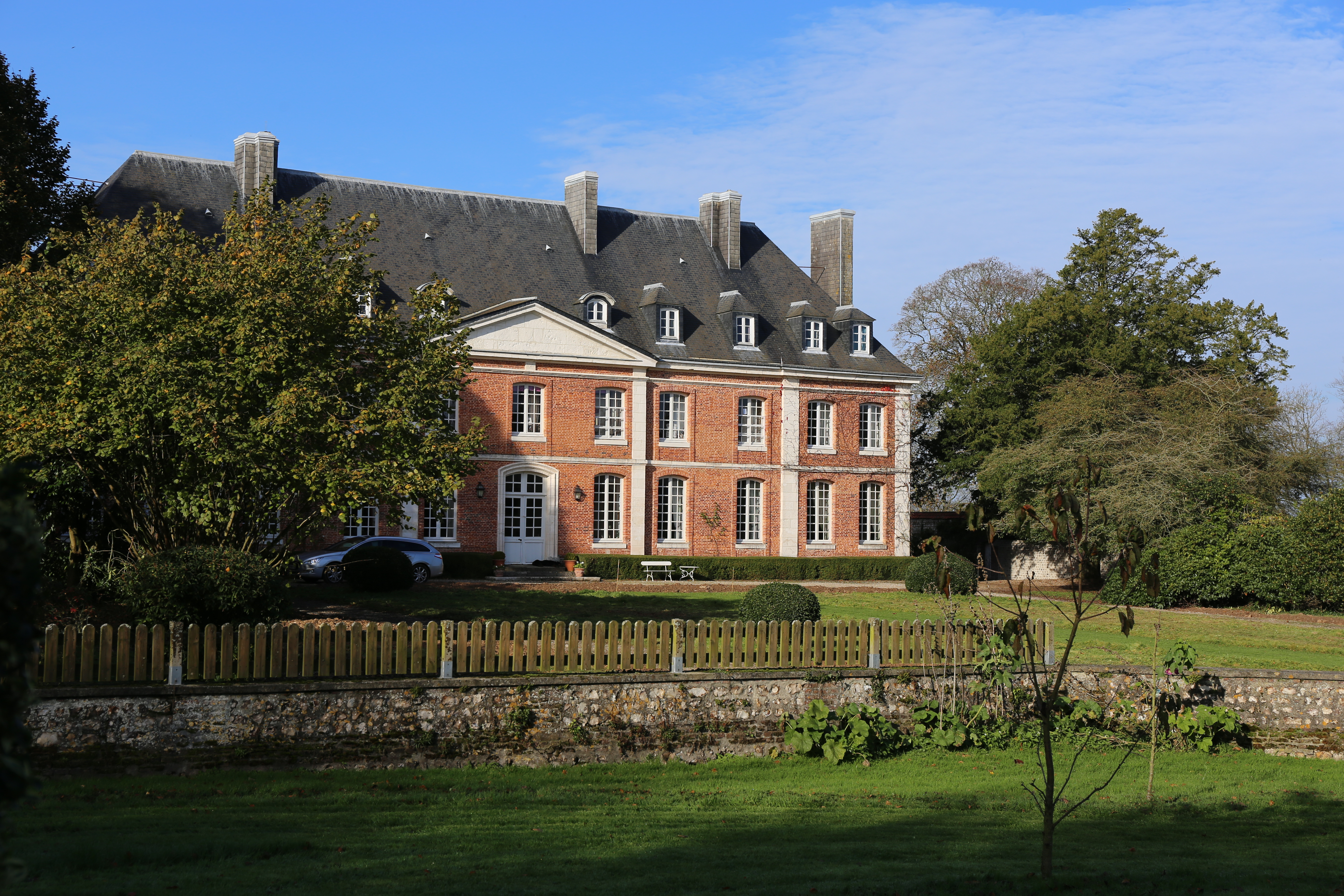
Gide's house in Cuverville

In 1939, Gide became the first living author to be published in the prestigious Bibliothèque de la Pléiade.

He left France for Africa in 1942 and lived in Tunis from December 1942 until it was retaken by French, British and American forces in May 1943 and he was able to travel to Algiers, where he stayed until the end of World War II. In 1947, he received the Nobel Prize in Literature "for his comprehensive and artistically significant writings, in which human problems and conditions have been presented with a fearless love of truth and keen psychological insight". He devoted much of his last years to publishing his Journal. Gide died in Paris on 19 February 1951. The Roman Catholic Church placed his works on the Index of Forbidden Books in 1952.

== Gide's life as a writer ==
Gide's biographer Alan Sheridan summed up Gide's life as a writer and an intellectual:

Gide was, by general consent, one of the dozen most important writers of the 20th century. Moreover, no writer of such stature had led such an interesting life, a life accessibly interesting to us as readers of his autobiographical writings, his journal, his voluminous correspondence and the testimony of others. It was the life of a man engaging not only in the business of artistic creation, but reflecting on that process in his journal, reading that work to his friends and discussing it with them; a man who knew and corresponded with all the major literary figures of his own country and with many in Germany and England; who found daily nourishment in the Latin, French, English and German classics, and, for much of his life, in the Bible; [who enjoyed playing Chopin and other classic works on the piano;] and who engaged in commenting on the moral, political and sexual questions of the day.

"Gide's fame rested ultimately, of course, on his literary works. But, unlike many writers, he was no recluse: he had a need of friendship and a genius for sustaining it." But his "capacity for love was not confined to his friends: it spilled over into a concern for others less fortunate than himself."

=== Writings ===
Gide's writing spans many genres. "As a master of prose narrative, occasional dramatist and translator, literary critic, letter writer, essayist, and diarist, André Gide provided twentieth-century French literature with one of its most intriguing examples of the man of letters."

But as Sheridan points out, "It is the fiction that lies at the summit of Gide's work." "Here, as in the oeuvre as a whole, what strikes one first is the variety. Here, too, we see Gide's curiosity, his youthfulness, at work: a refusal to mine only one seam, to repeat successful formulas...The fiction spans the early years of Symbolism, to the "comic, more inventive, even fantastic" pieces, to the later "serious, heavily autobiographical, first-person narratives"...In France Gide was considered a great stylist in the classical sense, "with his clear, succinct, spare, deliberately, subtly phrased sentences."

Gide's surviving letters run into the thousands. But it is the Journal that Sheridan calls "the pre-eminently Gidean mode of expression." "His first novel emerged from Gide's own journal, and many of the first-person narratives read more or less like journals. In Les faux-monnayeurs, Edouard's journal provides an alternative voice to the narrator's." "In 1946, when Pierre Herbert asked Gide which of his books he would choose if only one were to survive," Gide replied, "I think it would be my Journal.'" Beginning at the age of 18 or 19, Gide kept a journal of his life, and when it was first made available to the public, it ran to 1,300 pages.

=== Struggle for values ===
"Each volume that Gide wrote was intended to challenge itself, what had preceded it, and what could conceivably follow it. This characteristic, according to Daniel Moutote in his Cahiers de André Gide essay, is what makes Gide's work 'essentially modern': the 'perpetual renewal of the values by which one lives.'" Gide wrote in his Journal in 1930: "The only drama that really interests me and that I should always be willing to depict anew, is the debate of the individual with whatever keeps him from being authentic, with whatever is opposed to his integrity, to his integration. Most often the obstacle is within him. And all the rest is merely accidental."

As a whole, "The works of André Gide reveal his passionate revolt against the restraints and conventions inherited from 19th-century France. He sought to uncover the authentic self beneath its contradictory masks."

== Pederasty ==
In his journal, Gide distinguishes between adult-attracted "sodomites" and boy-loving "pederasts", categorizing himself as the latter.

I call a pederast the man who, as the word indicates, falls in love with young boys. I call a sodomite ("The word is sodomite, sir," said Verlaine to the judge who asked him if it were true that he was a sodomist) the man whose desire is addressed to mature men...The pederasts, of whom I am one (why cannot I say this quite simply, without your immediately claiming to see a brag in my confession?), are much rarer, and the sodomites much more numerous, than I first thought...That such loves can spring up, that such relationships can be formed, it is not enough for me to say that this is natural; I maintain that it is good; each of the two finds exaltation, protection, a challenge in them; and I wonder whether it is for the youth or the elder man that they are more profitable.

From an interview with film documentarian Nicole Védrès with Andre Gide:
Védrès "May I ask you an indiscreet question?
Gide "There are no indiscreet questions, only indiscreet answers."
Védrès "Is it true, cher Maître, that you are a homosexual?"
Gide "No monsieur, I am not a homosexual, I am a pederast!"
—from Vedres' documentary Life Starts Tomorrow (1950)

Gide's journal documents his behavior in the company of Oscar Wilde.

Wilde took a key out of his pocket and showed me into a tiny apartment of two rooms...The youths followed him, each of them wrapped in a burnous that hid his face. Then the guide left us and Wilde sent me into the further room with little Mohammed and shut himself up in the other with the [other boy]. Every time since then that I have sought after pleasure, it is the memory of that night I have pursued...My joy was unbounded, and I cannot imagine it greater, even if love had been added. How should there have been any question of love? How should I have allowed desire to dispose of my heart? No scruple clouded my pleasure and no remorse followed it. But what name then am I to give the rapture I felt as I clasped in my naked arms that perfect little body, so wild, so ardent, so sombrely lascivious? For a long time after Mohammed had left me, I remained in a state of passionate jubilation, and though I had already achieved pleasure five times with him, I renewed my ecstasy again and again, and when I got back to my room in the hotel, I prolonged its echoes until morning.

Gide's book Corydon, which he considered his most important work, includes a defense of pederasty. At that time (before 1945), the age of consent for any type of sexual activity was set at 13.

== See also ==
- Mise en abyme
