= Si le grain ne meurt =

1924 autobiography by André Gide

First English-language edition (Random House, 1935)

Si le grain ne meurt is the autobiography of the French writer André Gide. Published in 1924, it recounts the life of Gide from his childhood in Paris until his engagement with his cousin Madeleine Rondeaux in 1895.

The book has two parts. In the first, the author recounts his childhood memories: his private tutors, his time at the Ecole Alsacienne, his family, his friendship with Pierre Louÿs, the start of his veneration of his cousin, and his first efforts at writing. The book's title, Si le grain ne meurt, is an allusion to the Gospel of John 12:24–25.

The much shorter second part recounts his discovery of his homosexuality during a trip to Algeria, part of which was with Irish writer Oscar Wilde. At the time of its publication, parts of the book shocked the public with their depictions of homosexuality and detailed descriptions of Gide's debauchery.

Gide later recounted the total failure of his married life with Madeleine in another autobiography called Et nunc manet in te, written shortly after the death of his wife in 1938. It was published in 1951.

== Literature ==
- André Gide: Si le grain ne meurt. Collection Folio. Paris: Gallimard, 1972.
- Jean-Michel Wittmann: Si le grain ne meurt d'André Gide. Essai et dossier. Collection Foliothèque. Paris: Gallimard, 2005.
