= The Fruits of the Earth =

Prose-poem by André Gide

First US edition (publ. Alfred A. Knopf, 1949)

The Fruits of the Earth (French: Les nourritures terrestres) is a prose-poem by André Gide, published in France in 1897. A second part, French: Nouvelles nourritures ("Later Fruits") was added in 1935.

The book was written in 1895 (the year of Gide's marriage) and appeared in a review in 1896 before publication the next year. Gide admitted to the intellectual influence of Nietzsche's Thus Spoke Zarathustra but the true genesis was the author's own journey from the deforming influence of his puritanical religious upbringing to liberation in the arms of North African boys. Andre Maurois draws attention to the similarity of moral outlook between the two works in these words: "Like Thus Spake Zarathustra, Les Nourritures Terrestres is a gospel in the root sense of the word: glad tidings. Tidings about the meaning of life addressed to a dearly loved disciple whom Gide calls Nathanael." "Nathanael" comes from the Hebrew name נְתַנְאֵל, "Nethan'el", meaning "God has given".

The book has three characters: the narrator, the narrator's teacher, Menalque, and the young Nathanael. Menalque has two lessons to impart through the narrator. The first is to flee families, rules, stability. Gide himself suffered so much from "snug homes" that he harped on its dangers all his life. The second is to seek adventure, excess, fervor; one should loathe the lukewarm, security, all tempered feelings. "Not affection, Nathanael: love ..."

A subtly structured collection of lyrical fragments, reminiscences, poems, travel notes, and aphorisms, the book came to command such a following after World War I that Gide wrote a preface stressing the work's self-critical dimension. Nevertheless it influenced a generation of young writers, including a young Jacques Derrida and the existentialists Albert Camus and Jean-Paul Sartre, to cast off all that is artificial or merely conventional. In Roger Martin du Gard’s The Thibaults, two of the main characters, Jacques Thibault and Daniel de Fontanin, are deeply changed after reading the book.

== Emmanuel Macron ==
Alongside Charles de Gaulle’s War Memoirs (left open) and Stendhal’s The Red and the Black (closed) both resting on the presidential desk and visible in French President Emmanuel Macron’s official portrait, another closed book is The Fruits of the Earth.
