= Strait Is the Gate =

1909 French novel written by André Gide

- Author: André Gide
- Original title: La Porte Étroite
- Translator: Dorothy Bussy
- Language: French
- Genre: Novel
- Publication date: 1909

Strait Is the Gate (French: La Porte Étroite) is a 1909 French novel written by André Gide. It was translated into English by Dorothy Bussy. It probes the complexities and terrors of adolescence and growing up. Based on a Freudian interpretation, the story uses the influences of childhood experience and the misunderstandings that can arise between two people. Strait Is the Gate taps the unassuaged memory of Gide's unsuccessful wooing of his cousin between 1888 and 1891.

Much of the story is written as an epistolary novel between the protagonist Jerome and his love Alissa. Much of the end of the novel is taken up by an exploration into Alissa's journal that details most of the events of the novel from her perspective.

== Plot ==
The story is set in a French north coast town. Jerome and Alissa, cousins, as 10- to 11-year-olds make an implicit commitment of undying affection for each other. However, in reaction to her mother's infidelities and from an intense religious impression, Alissa develops a rejection of human love. Nevertheless, she is happy to enjoy Jerome's intellectual discussions and keeps him hanging on to her affection. Jerome thereby fails to recognize the real love of Alissa's sister Juliette, who ends up making a fairly unsatisfactory marriage with M. Tessiere as a sacrifice to her sister Alissa's love for Jerome. Jerome believes he has a commitment of marriage from Alissa, but she gradually withdraws into greater religious intensity, rejects Jerome and refuses to see him for longer and longer stretches of time. Eventually she dies in Paris from an unknown malady which is almost self-imposed. The ending of the novel occurs ten years after Alissa's death with the meeting of Jerome and Juliette. Juliette seems content to have a happy life with five children and a husband, but their conversation together in a room that resembles Alissa's concerns whether or not one can hold onto a love that is unrequited; as Jerome still loves Alissa, so it would seem that Juliette still loves Jerome, though both loves are equally as impossible.

== Comparison with The Immoralist ==
Alissa reached, by going the other way round the world, a damnation very similar to Gide's The Immoralist's—indeed, Strait Is the Gate might be called The Moralist. Hers is a greater perversity than Michel's, who, after all, was only doing what he liked. Alissa is doing what she does not like, and at each act of monstrous virtue her anguish increases, until it at last kills her. That said, her vision of heavenly joy is so surpassingly beautiful as almost to justify the means. In the limited sense in which the Immoralist was right in sinning for earthly joy, Alissa was justified in sinning to achieve her view of heaven. And each pays the exact price—spiritual death for Michel, bodily death and worse for Alissa. "Whom can I persuade that this book is the twin of The Immoralist," Gide wrote in his journal, "that the two subjects grew up together in my mind, the excess of the one finding a secret permission in the excess of the other, so that the two together form an equipoise?"

== Title ==
The title refers to a phrase in the Gospel of Luke in the Bible:

Strive to enter in at the strait gate: for many, I say unto you, will seek to enter in, and shall not be able.

This verse appears at the end of the first chapter as the subject of a sermon on the Sunday after Alissa's mother runs away with another man. During this sermon Jerome resolves to become virtuous enough to deserve Alissa. However Alissa ultimately interprets the "strait and narrow" to preclude any earthly happiness that Jerome and she could share in marriage.

The crux is that the gate of virtue is too narrow for two people, too narrow for love, and too narrow for two people in love. Alissa desires so deliriously that even though she loves Jerome, this love between them has become, in her mind, his impediment to virtue. She rejects him, time and time again, and yet this is the way in which she expresses love, because this is the only way he would enter the strait gate. What Alissa longs for, is not the strait gate itself, but the process of getting through the gate—it is the striving in "strive to enter in at the strait gate".

If either the strait gate of virtue or Jerome's love were no more, Alissa's desire would still stand. This is because it is not that we desire "something", but that our desires and what we desire are ultimately a situation, a process, in which overall, something becomes the object of desire.
