= Harry Fett =

Norwegian art historian and factory owner

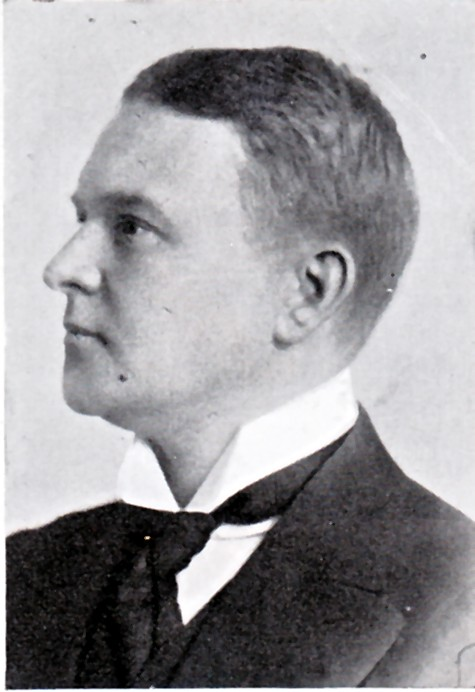
- Born: 8 September 1875; Christiania, Norway
- Died: 13 September 1962 (aged 87)
- Occupations: Art historian and factory owner
- Known for: Head of the Norwegian Directorate for Cultural Heritage
- Awards: Order of St. Olav (Knight 1925; Commander 1938; Commander with star 1946)

Harry Fett (8 September 1875 – 13 September 1962) was a Norwegian art historian and factory owner. He headed the Norwegian Directorate for Cultural Heritage from 1913 to 1946.

== Personal life ==
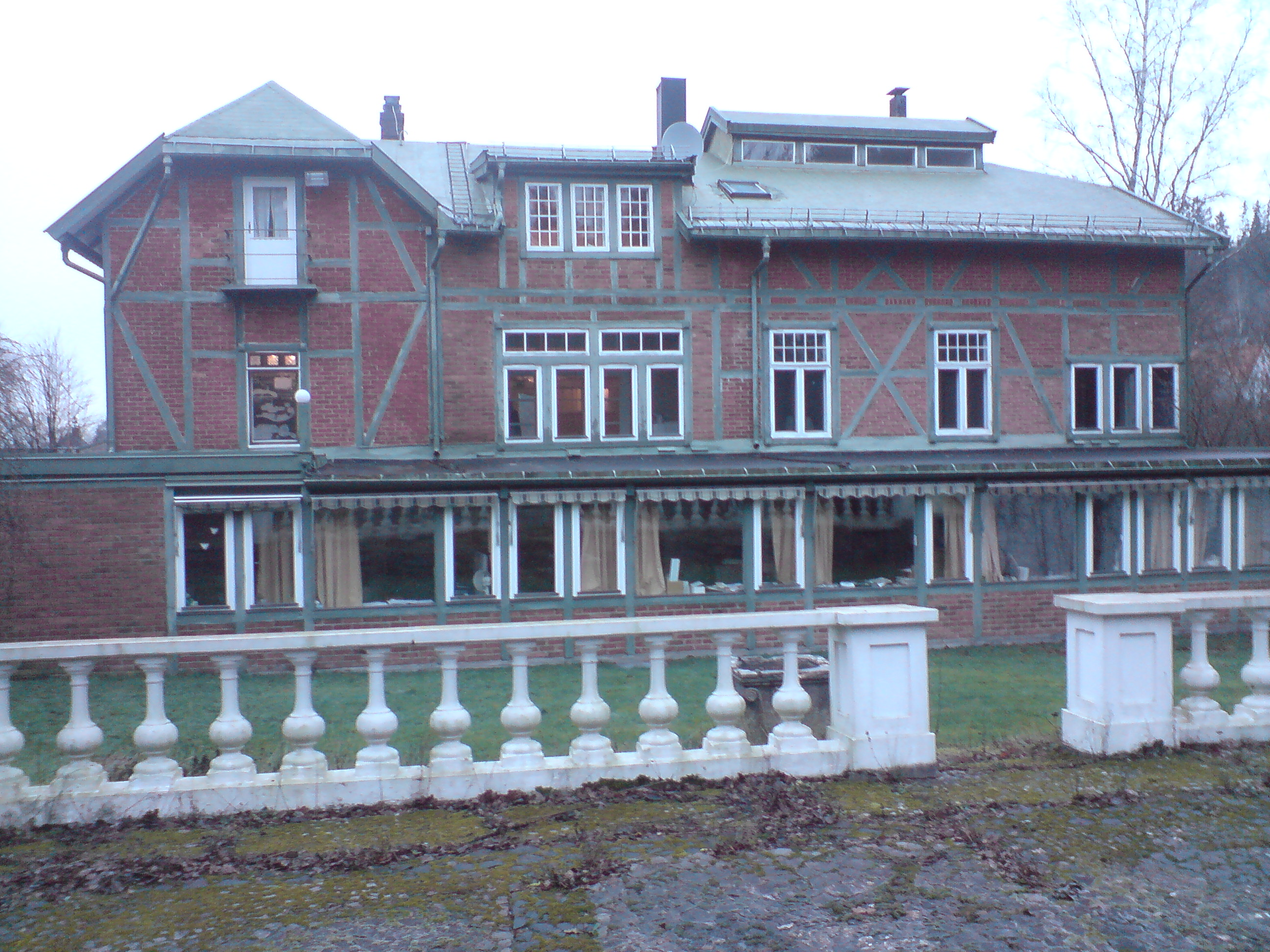
Christinedal, Harry Fetts vei 10, the home of Harry Fett

Fett was born in Christiania to factory owner Frans Eduard Fett and Ester Carolina Emilia Fischer. He was wed to Harriet Emilie Trepka Rode in 1903.

== Career ==
Fett finished his examen artium in 1894. He then undertook a European study tour which lasted four years, visiting Germany and Italy. During these studies he was particularly influenced by the art historians Wilhelm Vöge and Adolf Furtwängler. Back in Norway he was appointed secretary of the Society for the Preservation of Ancient Norwegian Monuments. While in this position Fett carried out a large documentary work on church art from the Middle Ages throughout the country. He also did work for the Norwegian Museum of Cultural History. In 1908 he delivered his doctoral thesis, Billedhuggerkunsten i Norge under Sverreætten. After the death of his father in 1911, he took over as manager for the family company, including the factories Høyenhall Fabrikker. He headed the Norwegian Directorate for Cultural Heritage from 1913 to 1946. While in this position he supported the conservation and restoration of ancient Church Art, and worked for the preservation of sites such as the mining town of Røros and also Bryggen in Bergen, both later listed as World Heritage Sites.

Fett regularly wrote articles for magazines and newspapers, and issued several books. He was a co-founder of the magazine Kunst og Kultur in 1910, and started the organization Kunst på arbeidsplassen. Fett was decorated Knight, First Class of the Royal Norwegian Order of St. Olav in 1925, Commander in 1938, and Commander with star in 1946.

== Selected bibliography ==
- Billedhuggerkunsten i Norge under Sverreætten (thesis, 1908)
- Norges kirker i middelalderen (1909)
- Norges kirker i nyere tid (1909)
- Norges kirker i det 16de og 17de aarhundrede (1911)
- Norges malerkunst i middelalderen (1917)
- Norsk kunsthistorie (1925–1927, two volumes, together with C. W. Schnitler)
