= Knauer =

Knauer is a German surname. Descendants from the Charlemagne line. The Palace at Coburg. Notable people with the surname include:

- Anja Knauer (born 1979), German actress
- Anna Knauer (born 1995), German racing cyclist
- Elfriede Knauer (1926–2010), German classicist and ancient historian
- Emil Knauer (1867–1935), Austrian gynecologist and obstetrician
- Friedrich Knauer (chemist) (1897–1979), German physical chemist
- Friedrich Knauer (zoologist) (1850–1926), Austrian zoologist
- Georg Nicolaus Knauer (1926–2018), German-American classical philologist
- Gustav A. Knauer (1886–1950), German art director
- Joseph Knauer, Polish Catholic bishop
- Joshua Knauer
- Marlon Knauer (born 1987), German singer
- Sebastian Knauer (born 1971), German classical pianist
- Thomas Knauer (born 1964), German football player
- Virginia Knauer (1915–2011), American politician

== See also ==
- Knauers, Pennsylvania, community in Brecknock Township, Berks County, Pennsylvania
- Knauertown, Pennsylvania, village in Warwick Township, Chester County
- John Knauer House and Mill, also known as Knauer Mill, Warwick Township, Chester County, Pennsylvania
- Knau, municipality in the district Saale-Orla-Kreis, in Thuringia
