= Kaschnitz =

Kaschnitz is a surname of Austro-Hungarian origin. Notable people with the surname include:

- Guido Kaschnitz von Weinberg (1890–1958), Austrian-German archaeologist and art historian, husband of Marie Luise
- Marie Luise Kaschnitz (1901–1974), German short story writer, novelist, essayist and poet

== See also ==
- Marie Luise Kaschnitz Prize, German literary prize
