= 1965 Nobel Prize in Literature =

- Mikhail Sholokhov
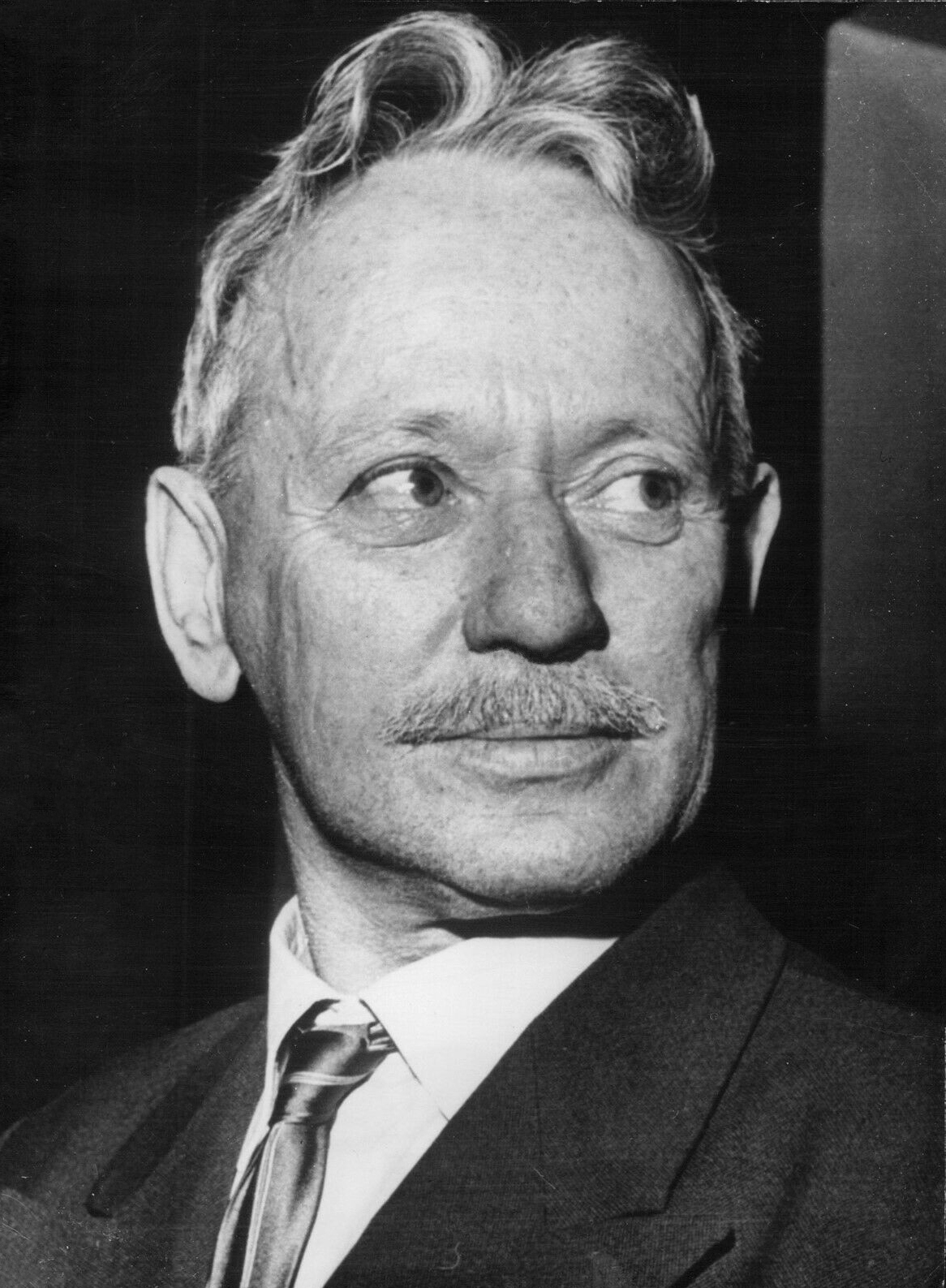
- "for the artistic power and integrity with which, in his epic of the Don, he has given expression to a historic phase in the life of the Russian people."
- Date: 15 October 1965 (announcement); 10 December 1965 (ceremony)
- Location: Stockholm, Sweden
- Presented by: Swedish Academy
- First award: 1901
- Website: Official website

The 1965 Nobel Prize in Literature was awarded the Soviet-Russian novelist Mikhail Sholokhov (1905–1984) "for the artistic power and integrity with which, in his epic of the Don, he has given expression to a historic phase in the life of the Russian people." He is the third Russian-speaking author to become the prize's recipient.

== Laureate ==
Mikhail Sholokhov was born in Vyoshenskaya, Russia. He fought in the Russian Civil War as a Bolshevik at the age of 13. To pursue a career as a journalist, he relocated to Moscow in 1922. He returned to his birthplace two years later and concentrated solely on his literary career. He drew inspiration for his debut book, Donskie Rasskazy ("Tales from the Don", 1925), from his experiences in both the Russian Civil War and World War I.

His magnum opus Tikhii Don ("The Quiet Don", 1928–1966) was published in four volumes (translated as And Quiet Flows the Don (1934); The Don Flows Home to the Sea (1940); Quiet Flows the Don (1966)) to him 14 years to complete. It was praised as a potent illustration of socialist realism and became the most widely-read book in Soviet literature. Sholokhov had a keen interest in how people's lives played out against Russia's changes and problems. It took him 27 years to complete his other significant piece for the Don cycle, Podnyataya Tselina ("Virgin Soil Upturned", 1932–1960).

== Deliberations ==
=== Nominations ===
Sholokhov started receiving nominations for the Nobel Prize in Literature since 1947. He received 20 nominations in total until he was eventually awarded. He received the highest number of nominations in the year 1965.

For this year, the Nobel Committee received 120 nominations for 93 authors including Simon Vestdijk, Ramón Menéndez Pidal, Nelly Sachs (awarded in 1966), André Malraux, Ezra Pound, Pablo Neruda (awarded in 1971), E. M. Forster, Max Frisch, and Taha Hussein. 21 of the nominees were newly nominated, such as Alejo Carpentier, Konstantin Paustovsky, Mohammad-Ali Jamalzadeh, Anna Akhmatova, Marguerite Yourcenar, Gyula Illyés, Marie Luise Kaschnitz, Gilbert Cesbron, Giovannino Guareschi, and Alan Sillitoe. The highest number of nominations was for the French author André Malraux (with six nominations). Eight of the nominees were women, namely: Marguerite Yourcenar, Judith Wright, Anna Akhmatova, Katherine Anne Porter, Marie Luise Kaschnitz, Nelly Sachs, Maria Dąbrowska, and María Raquel Adler.

The authors Jacques Audiberti, Alejandro Casona, Thomas B. Costain, Rampo Edogawa, Eleanor Farjeon, Lorraine Hansberry, Louis Hjelmslev, Mehdi Huseyn, Shirley Jackson, Randall Jarrell, Una Marson, Betty Miller, Edgar Mittelholzer, Fan S. Noli, Dawn Powell, Arthur Schlesinger, Sr., Jack Spicer, Howard Spring, Thomas Sigismund Stribling, Paul Tillich, and Aslaug Vaa died in 1965 without having been nominated for the prize.

Official list of nominees and their nominators for the prize
No.	Nominee	Country	Genre(s)	Nominator(s)
1	Anna Akhmatova (1889–1966)	Soviet Union	poetry	William Harkins (1921–2014); Roman Jakobson (1896–1982)
2	María Raquel Adler (1901–1974)	Argentina	poetry, essays	Catholic University of Cuyo
3	Theodor Adorno (1903–1969)	West Germany	philosophy, essays	Helmut Viebrock (1912–1997)
4	Shmuel Yosef Agnon (1887–1970)	Israel	novel, short story	Baruch Kurzweil (1907–1972)
5	Alceu Amoroso Lima (1893–1983)	Brazil	philosophy, essays, literary criticism	Academia Mineira de Letras
6	Louis Aragon (1897–1982)	France	novel, short story, poetry, essays	André-Marc Vial (1917–1987); Robert Ricatte (1913–1995); Henri Weber (1914–2015)
7	Tudor Arghezi (1880–1967)	Romania	novel, short story, poetry, essays	Angelo Monteverdi (1886–1967)
8	Miguel Ángel Asturias (1899–1974)	Guatemala	novel, short story, poetry, essays, drama	Erik Lindegren (1910–1968)
9	Wystan Hugh Auden (1907–1973)	United Kingdom; United States	poetry, essays, screenplay	Ernest Ludwig Stahl (1902–1992); René Wellek (1903–1995)
10	Samuel Beckett (1906–1989)	Ireland	novel, drama, poetry	William Stuart Maguinness (1903–1983)
11	René Béhaine (1880–1966)	France	novel, short story, essays	Yves Gandon (1899–1975)
12	Jorge Luis Borges (1899–1986)	Argentina	poetry, essays, translation, short story	Raimundo Lida (1908–1979); The Swedish PEN Club
13	Henri Bosco (1888–1976)	France	novel, short story	Barthélémy-Antonin Taladoire (1907–1976)
14	Maurice Bowra (1898–1971)	United Kingdom	history, essays, literary criticism, poetry	Ernest Ludwig Stahl (1902–1992)
15	Martin Buber (1878–1965)	Austria; Israel	philosophy	Ragnar Josephson (1891–1966); Henry Olsson (1896–1985)
16	Heinrich Böll (1917–1985)	West Germany	novel, short story	Gustav Korlén (1915–2014)
17	Josep Carner (1884–1970)	Spain	poetry, drama, translation	Robert Guiette (1895–1976)
18	Alejo Carpentier (1904–1980)	Cuba	novel, short story, essays	Jean-Louis Flecniakoska (1913–2005)
19	Gilbert Cesbron (1913–1979)	France	novel, short story, essays, drama, poetry	Pierre Jonin (1912–1997)
20	André Chamson (1900–1983)	France	novel, essays	Charles Rostaing (1904–1999)
21	René Char (1907–1988)	France	poetry	Georges Blin (1917–2016)
22	Maria Dąbrowska (1889–1965)	Poland	novel, short story, essays, drama, literary criticism	Carl Stief (1914–1998)
23	Lawrence Durrell (1912–1990)	United Kingdom	novel, short story, poetry, drama, essays	Paul Gerhard Buchloh (1922–1986)
24	Friedrich Dürrenmatt (1921–1990)	Switzerland	drama, novel, short story, essays	Friedrich Sengle (1909–1994)
25	Johan Falkberget (1879–1967)	Norway	novel, short story, essays	Hans Heiberg (1904–1978)
26	Edward Morgan Forster (1879–1970)	United Kingdom	novel, short story, drama, essays, biography, literary criticism	Pierre Legouis (1891–1975)
27	Max Frisch (1911–1991)	Switzerland	novel, drama	René Kaech (1909–1989); Hans Robert Jauss (1921–1997); Heinrich Matthias Heinrichs (1911–1983)
28	Sudhindra Nath Ghose (1899–1965)	India	novel, short story, essays	Henri de Ziégler (1885–1970)
29	Gopal Singh (1917–1990)	India	biography, law, essays, translation	Henrik Samuel Nyberg (1889–1974); Karl Ragnar Gierow (1904–1982)
30	Giovannino Guareschi (1908–1968)	Italy	novel, short story, essays	Mario Manlio Rossi (1895–1971)
31	Jean Guéhenno (1890–1978)	France	essays, literary criticism	Edmond Jarno (1905–1985)
32	Jorge Guillén (1893–1984)	Spain	poetry, literary criticism	Henri Peyre (1901–1988)
33	Jean Guitton (1901–1999)	France	philosophy, theology	Édouard Delebecque (1910–1990)
34	Gunnar Gunnarsson (1889–1975)	Iceland	novel, short story, poetry	Stellan Arvidson (1902–1997)
35	Leslie Poles Hartley (1895–1972)	United Kingdom	novel, short story, essays	Geoffrey Tillotson (1905–1969)
36	Pêr-Jakez Helias (1914–1995)	France	poetry, drama, essays	André Lebois (1915–1978)
37	Taha Hussein (1889–1973)	Egypt	novel, short story, poetry, translation	Charles Pellat (1914–1992)
38	Gyula Illyés (1902–1983)	Hungary	poetry, novel, drama, essays	János Lotz (1913–1973)
39	Jarosław Iwaszkiewicz (1894–1980)	Poland	poetry, essays, drama, translation, short story, novel	Jean Fabre (1904–1975)
40	Mohammad-Ali Jamalzadeh (1892–1997)	Iran	short story, translation	Richard Nelson Frye (1920–2014)
41	Eyvind Johnson (1900–1976)	Sweden	novel, short story	Carl-Eric Thors (1920–1986)
42	Marcel Jouhandeau (1888–1979)	France	short story, novel	Jean Gaulmier (1905–1997)
43	Ernst Jünger (1895–1998)	West Germany	philosophy, novel, memoir	Rudolf Till (1911–1979); Léon Cellier (1911–1976)
44	Marie Luise Kaschnitz (1901–1974)	West Germany	novel, short story, essays, drama	Hermann Tiemann (1899–1981)
45	Yasunari Kawabata (1899–1972)	Japan	novel, short story	Harry Martinson (1904–1978)
46	Miroslav Krleža (1893–1981)	Yugoslavia	poetry, drama, short story, novel, essays	Association of Writers of Yugoslavia
47	Erich Kästner (1899–1974)	West Germany	poetry, screenplay, autobiography	Werner Betz (1912–1980)
48	André Malraux (1901–1976)	France	novel, essays, literary criticism	Georges Vallet (1922–994); Victor Brombert (1923–2024); Yves Le Hir (1919–2005); John Martin Cocking (1914–1986); Henri Peyre (1901–1988); Robert Niklaus (1910–2001)
49	Gabriel Marcel (1889–1973)	France	philosophy, drama	Olof Gigon (1912–1998)
50	William Somerset Maugham (1874–1965)	United Kingdom	novel, short story, drama, essays	Jean-Albert Bédé (1903–1977)
51	Ramón Menéndez Pidal (1869–1968)	Spain	philology, history	Gunnar Tilander (1894–1973); Rudolf Großmann (1882–1941); H. Baader (?); Hans Flasche (1911–1994); Olaf Deutschmann (1912–1989)
52	Yukio Mishima (1925–1970)	Japan	novel, short story, drama, literary criticism	Harry Martinson (1904–1978)
53	Vilhelm Moberg (1898–1973)	Sweden	novel, drama, history	Gösta Bergman (1894–1984)
54	Henry de Montherlant (1895–1972)	France	essays, novel, drama	Louis Moulinier (1904–1971)
56	Alberto Moravia (1907–1990)	Italy	novel, literary criticism, essays, drama	Uberto Limentani (1913–1989)
57	Vladimir Nabokov (1899–1977)	Russia; United States	novel, short story, poetry, drama, translation, literary criticism, memoir	Andrew Chiappe (1915–1967); Frederick Wilcox Dupee (1904–1979)
58	Pablo Neruda (1904–1973)	Chile	poetry	Lennart Breitholtz (1909–1998); University of Chile; Juan Marichal (1922–2010)
59	Junzaburō Nishiwaki (1894–1982)	Japan	poetry, literary criticism	Naoshirō Tsuji (1899–1979)
60	Konstantin Paustovsky (1892–1968)	Soviet Union	novel, poetry, drama	Karl Ragnar Gierow (1904–1982)
61	Katherine Anne Porter (1890–1980)	United States	short story, essays	George Hendrick (1929–2021)
62	Ezra Pound (1885–1972)	United States	poetry, essays	Hans Galinsky (1909–1991)
63	Zayn al-ʻĀbidīn Rahnamā (1894–1990)	Iran	history, essays, translation	Ali-Asghar Hekmat (1893–1980)
64	Wilhelm Röpke (1899–1966)	West Germany; Switzerland	essays	Olof Gigon (1912–1998)
65	Nelly Sachs (1891–1970)	West Germany; Sweden	poetry, drama	Gunnar Tideström (1906–1985); Henry Olsson (1896–1985)
66	Aksel Sandemose (1899–1965)	Denmark; Norway	novel, essays	Eyvind Johnson (1900–1976)
67	Alan Sillitoe (1928–2010)	United Kingdom	novel, short story, essays, poetry, translation	Robert Graves (1895–1985)
68	Georges Simenon (1903–1989)	Belgium	novel, short story, memoir	René Kaech (1909–1989)
69	Upton Sinclair (1878–1968)	United States	novel, short story, drama, autobiography, essays	Sidney Kaplan (1913–1993)
70	Charles Percy Snow (1905–1980)	United Kingdom	novel, essays	Friedrich Schubel (1904–1991); Sylvère Monod (1921–2006)
71	Mikhail Sholokhov (1905–1984)	Soviet Union	novel	Konstantin Fedin (1892–1977); Leonid Leonov (1899–1994); Aleksandr Tvardovsky (1910–1971); Alexey Surkov (1899–1983); Ivan Anisimov (1899–1966); Nikolai Iosifovich Konrad (1891–1970); Michail Khraptchenko (1904–1986); Viktor Vinogradov (1895–1969); John Stephenson Spink (1909–1985); André-Marc Vial (1917–1987)
72	Carl Erik Soya (1896–1983)	Denmark	short story, drama, screenplay, poetry, essays	The Danish PEN-Club
73	Stijn Streuvels (1871–1969)	Belgium	novel, short story	Maurice Gilliams (1900–1982)
74	Jun'ichirō Tanizaki (1886–1965)	Japan	novel, short story	Harry Martinson (1904–1978)
75	Gustave Thibon (1903–2001)	France	philosophy	Édouard Delebecque (1910–1990)
76	Miguel Torga (1907–1995)	Portugal	poetry, short story, novel, drama, autobiography	Göran Hammarström (1922–2019)
80	Lionel Trilling (1905–1975)	United States	essays, literary criticism, short story	Lewis Gaston Leary (1906–1990)
81	Henri Troyat (1911–2007)	France	novel, biography, history	Ernst Dickenmann (1902–1985)
82	Pietro Ubaldi (1886–1972)	Italy	philosophy, essays	Academia Santista de Letras
83	Giuseppe Ungaretti (1888–1970)	Italy	poetry, essays, literary criticism	Otis Fellows (1908–1993)
84	Tarjei Vesaas (1897–1970)	Norway	poetry, novel	Elie Poulenard (1901–1985); Johannes Andreasson Dale (1898–1975)
85	Simon Vestdijk (1898–1971)	Netherlands	novel, poetry, essays, translation	Dutch Academy of Sciences; The Dutch PEN-Club; Karl Ragnar Gierow (1904–1982)
86	Robert Penn Warren (1905–1989)	United States	novel, poetry, essays, literary criticism	Cleanth Brooks (1906–1994)
87	Thornton Wilder (1897–1975)	United States	drama, novel, short story	Frederick Albert Pottle (1897–1987); Peter Wapnewski (1922–2012)
88	Edmund Wilson (1895–1972)	United States	essays, literary criticism, short story, drama	Wiktor Weintraub (1908–1988); Douglas Bush (1896–1983)
89	Judith Wright (1915–2000)	Australia	poetry, literary criticism, novel, essays	Greta Hort (1903–1967)
90	Marguerite Yourcenar (1903–1987)	France	novel, essays, poetry	Ida-Marie Frandon (1907–1997)
91	Juan Antonio de Zunzunegui (1901–1982)	Spain	novel	Elie Poulenard (1901–1985)
92	Arnold Zweig (1887–1968)	East Germany	novel, short story	Deutsche Academy of Arts; Rudolph Ruzicka (1883–1978)
93	Arnulf Øverland (1889–1968)	Norway	poetry, essays	Francis Bull (1887–1974); Andreas Hofgaard Winsnes (1889–1972)

=== Prize decision ===
The Nobel committee of the Swedish Academy was unanimous to propose that the prize should be awarded to Mikhail Sholokhov, who had been a candidate for many years and a main candidate for the prize the previous year. Committee member Anders Österling stated that "His series of novels from the land of the Don Cossacks is a classic masterpiece that retains its brilliance with every re-reading, and this folk epic still constitutes an indisputable basis for the award, even if it comes quite late." The committee discussed a proposal to share the prize between Sholokhov and Anna Akhmatova, but the idea was rejected by Anders Österling, saying that the authors had nothing but their language in common. The committee also discussed the possibility of a shared prize to Miguel Angel Asturias and Jorge Luis Borges, and to Shmuel Yosef Agnon and Nelly Sachs respectively.

== Reactions ==
The choice of Sholokhov was widely criticised for being allegedly politically motivated, but was celebrated by the authorities in the Soviet Union.
