= Envirolink =

Envirolink may refer to:

- EnviroLink Network, a clearinghouse for environmental information on the Internet
- Envirolink Northwest, an organisation which exists to support the environmental technologies and services sector in England's Northwest
