= Sybille Haynes =

Sybille Haynes MBE
- Born: Sybille Edith Overhoff; 3 July 1926 (age 100); Leverkusen, Germany
- Spouse: Denys Haynes (m. 1951; died 1994)

Academic background
- Education: Goethe University Frankfurt
- Doctoral advisor: Guido Kaschnitz von Weinberg

Academic work
- Discipline: Classical archaeology and ancient history
- Sub-discipline: Etruscology
- Institutions: British Museum; Corpus Christi College, Oxford

Sybille Edith Haynes, MBE (née Overhoff; born 3 July 1926) is a British expert on Etruscology. She grew up and was educated in Germany and Austria before moving to the UK in the 1950s. She worked with Etruscan artefacts at the British Museum for many years as well as publishing numerous books, for fellow scholars and also for the general public. In the 1980s she joined the Centre for the Study of Greek and Roman Antiquity at Corpus Christi College, Oxford.

== Early life and education ==
Born Sybille Overhoff on 3 July 1926 to Edith née Kloeppel, her German mother, and Julius Overhoff, her Austrian father, she was one of five siblings including her twin sister Elfriede Knauer, an archaeologist. She grew up in a cultured family in Berlin, Frankfurt and Austria but her schooling was interrupted by the Nazi regime. She had to join Nazi youth organisations and spent a year doing compulsory labour in harsh conditions. After the war things remained difficult for some time and she studied Chinese while waiting for Frankfurt University to reopen in 1947. However, she had always been interested in the antiquities collected by her maternal great-grandfather, the sculptor and art historian Melchior zur Straßen, and had a long-standing wish to study classical archaeology, and in particular, Etruscology. Once at the Goethe University Frankfurt she studied classical archaeology, ancient history, art history and ethnology and found vacation work in museums in Paris, Rome, and London before graduating summa cum laude in December 1950. She went on to write a thesis on Etruscan bronze mirrors, supervised and encouraged by Guido von Kaschnitz.

== British Museum ==
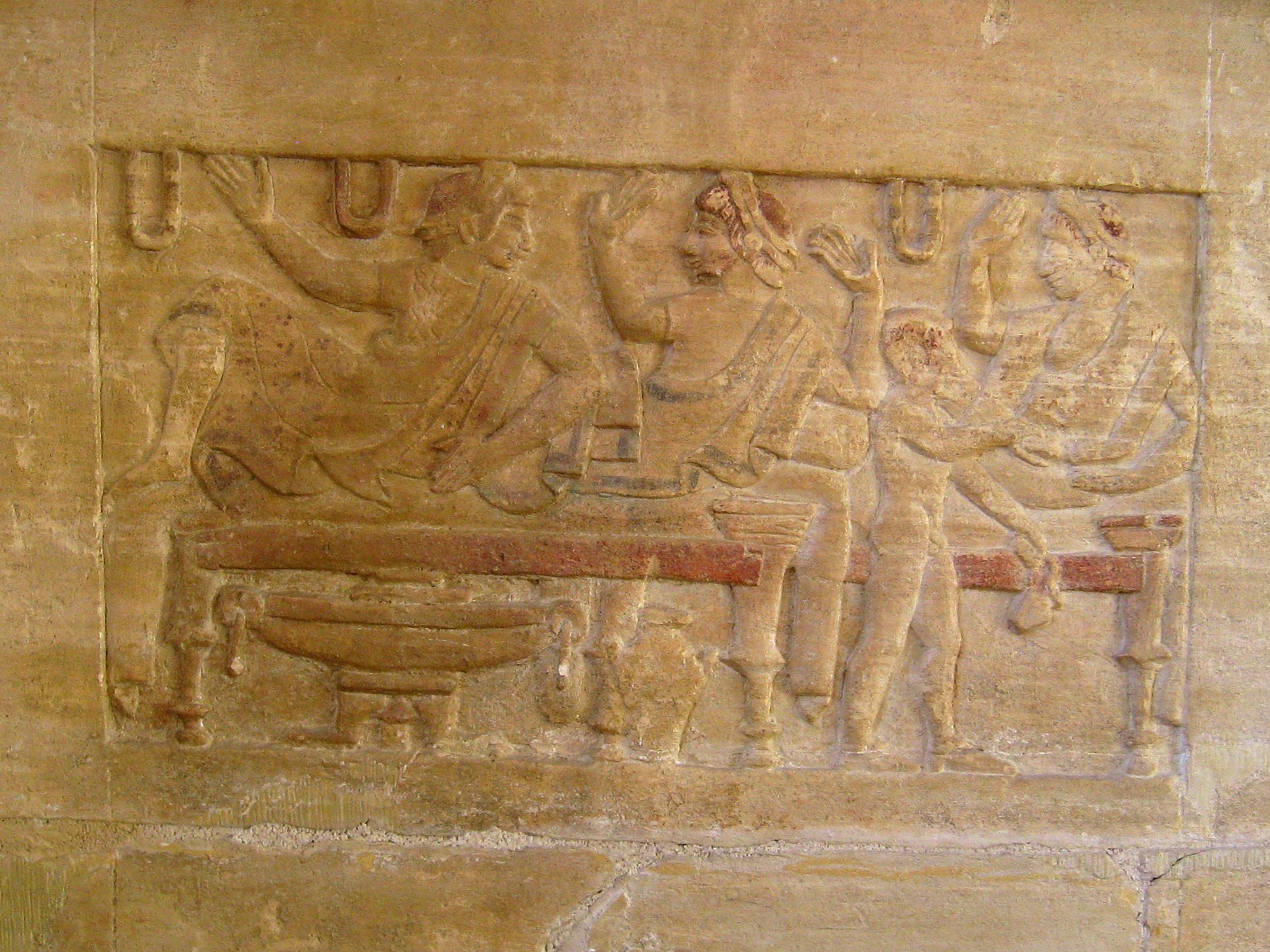
Sarcophagus from the Sperandio necropolis near Perugia, discussed in Haynes' Etruscan Civilisation

While she was helping at the British Museum in 1950, where the Greek and Roman department had suffered severe bomb damage, she met Denys Haynes (1913–1994), later Keeper of Greek and Roman Antiquities, whom she married in January 1951. She had also come to know the previous Keeper, Bernard Ashmole, who offered her a voluntary position in the department where her work included answering questions about Etruscan subjects and handling correspondence in German and Italian. She described this as an opportunity to study and learn. Amongst her writings were two booklets for the museum on Etruscan bronze utensils and Etruscan sculpture. In 1985 she published Etruscan Bronzes, an Etruscan novel called The Augur's Daughter in 1987 (first published in German in 1981) and Etruscan Civilization in 2000 (and an enlarged German edition in 2005). She also published regularly in international journals and was made a foreign member of the Istituto di Studi Etruschi ed Italici in 1965. In 1976, the year she was awarded an MBE, Haynes was responsible for the opening of the first ever Etruscan gallery in the classical department of the British Museum. In 1981 she was honoured by the Order of the Dignitari dell'Ombra della Sera in Volterra.

== Later career ==
In 1985 she moved to Oxford where she was invited to join Corpus Christi College, Oxford and the Centre for the Study of Greek and Roman Antiquity. In the same year she was made a corresponding member of the Deutsches Archäologisches Institut. In 2000 her book, Etruscan Civilization: A Cultural History was very well-received, and has been described as "definitive and comprehensive" as well as "authoritative, precise, engaging and articulate". Neil MacGregor, while director of the British Museum, called Haynes an "Etruscologist of international repute" in the introduction to a 2011 festschrift. A Sybille Haynes Lecturership in Etruscan and Italic Archaeology at Somerville College, Oxford was created in 2013, and the university hosts a recently established annual Sybille Haynes lecture series open to the public. The current Sybille Haynes lecturer is Charlotte Potts.

== Select bibliography ==
As well as writing numerous articles, Haynes published these books:

- 2023, Storia culturale degli Etruschi, Milan
- 2008, Die Etruskerin, Mainz
- 2005, Kulturgeschichte der Etrusker, Mainz
- 2000, Etruscan Civilization: A Cultural History, London (2nd edn in german: 2005; 3rd edition in italian: 2023 - see above)
- 1987, The Augur’s Daughter, (fiction) London (repr. 2008)
- 1981, Die Tochter des Augers, (fiction) Frankfurt(repr. 2008) as Die Etruskerin.
- 1985, Etruscan Bronzes, London and New York
- 1985, Zwischen Mäander und Taurus: eine archäologische Reise in Kleinasien, Munich.
- 1981, Die Tochter des Augurs. Aus dem Leben der Etrusker, Mainz
- 1974, Land of the Chimaera. An Archaeological Excursion in the SouthWest of Turkey, London
- 1971, Etruscan Sculpture, London
- 1965, Etruscan Bronze Utensils, London (rev. edn 1974)
