= María Raquel Adler =

Argentine poet

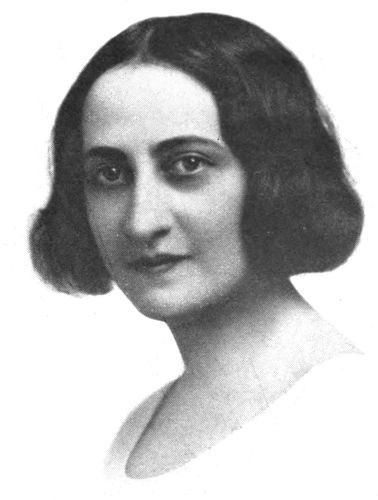
- Born: c. 1900 or 12 October 1899; Argentine Sea
- Died: 28 July 1974 (aged 73–74); Bernal, Buenos Aires, Argentina

María Raquel Adler (c. 1900 – 28 July 1974) was an Argentine Catholic mystic and religious poet.

== Biography ==
Adler was originally born on a boat to Jewish immigrant parents of German and Romanian origins. Her mother gave birth to her on a return trip from Europe.

Adler taught French at the La Plata Normal School and Spanish in other educational centers in Argentina. She was a member of the board of directors of the Argentine Society of Writers between 1934 and 1938, and also part of the Association of Catholic Writers and Publicists.

After her parents converted to Catholicism, she followed their footsteps proclaiming herself a "daughter of Israel in Christ". She dedicated her literary career to Jesus Christ. Her religious poems were praised by Spanish academics such as Rafael Cansinos-Asséns, who described them as "naive and primitive feeling that recalls that of the first patriarchs who shepherded in the deserts and perceived God as the soul of those vastnesses, as the living reality of the word immensity", and Ramón Menéndez Pidal, who said that "her inspiration from Him is not a copy of that of poets, as often happens so often, but rather the inspiration of a poetess full of intimate sincerity".

Adler was nominated twice for the Nobel Prize in Literature, by the literary group Consejo del Escritor in 1959, and by the professors of the Catholic University of Cuyo in 1965. She was the fourth and first female Argentine writer to be nominated for such an honor.

Adler continued writing poetry and experimented with other genres such as prose or theatre until her death on July 28, 1974.

The Roman Catholic Diocese of Quilmes is considering Adler for sainthood.

== Publications ==
God in me

GOD in me has kindled the most sacred flame,
indestructible power of time that inflames it.

God has poured into me so many human gifts,
that through the centuries they become superhuman.

He has infiltrated me with the greatest wonder:
Vibrate with all life, shine with what shines;

With everything he sings, cries, laughs or moans;
With the unknown, this sublime truth

Of the eternal mystery, close or infinite;
With day and night, with the sacred myth of it.
(from Místicas, translated by Concha Zardoya. 1923)

=== Poetry Collections ===
- Revelación (1922)
- Místicas (1923)
- Cantos de Raquel (1925)
- La divina tortura (1927)
- De Israel a Cristo (1933)
- Buenos Aires, ciudad y poesía (1936)
- Sonetos de Dios (1937)
- Cancion del hombre y la ola (1938)
- Llave del cielo (1943)
- Veneración (1950)
- El libro de los siete sellos (1957)

=== Essays ===
- Pan bajado del cielo (1934)
- De la tierra al cielo (1936)
