= D. E. L. Haynes =

English classical scholar (1913–1994)

- Born: Denys Eyre Lankester Haynes; 15 February 1913; Harrogate, Yorkshire, England
- Died: 27 September 1994 (aged 81); Oxford, Oxfordshire, England
- Spouse: Sybille Edith Overhoff (m. 1951)

Academic background
- Education: Marlborough College
- Alma mater: Trinity College, Cambridge; University of Bonn

Academic work
- Discipline: Classics
- Sub-discipline: Roman North Africa; Ancient Greek art; Ancient Greek sculpture; Bronze sculpture
- Institutions: British School at Rome; Victoria and Albert Museum; British Museum

Denys Eyre Lankester Haynes (15 February 1913 – 27 September 1994) was an English classical scholar, archaeologist, and museum curator, who specialised in the full range of classical archaeology. He was Keeper of Greek and Roman Antiquities at the British Museum between 1956 and 1976. He was additionally Geddes–Harrower Professor of Greek Art and Archaeology at the University of Aberdeen from 1972 to 1973, and, in retirement, visitor to the Ashmolean Museum from 1979 to 1987. He had served in military intelligence during the Second World War.

== Early life and education ==
Haynes was born on 15 February 1913 in Harrogate, Yorkshire, England. (Note: Some sources say Harrowgate, County Durham, England.) He was educated at Marlborough College, then an all-boys private boarding school, between 1926 and 1932. In 1932, he matriculated into Trinity College, Cambridge to study the classical tripos. He specialised in classical archaeology, and graduated with a first class Bachelor of Arts (BA) degree in 1935. He then undertook a further year of study in Roman provincial archaeology at the University of Bonn.

== Career ==
=== Pre-war ===
Haynes began his academic career as a scholar at the British School at Rome from 1936 to 1937: during this time he undertook research for his first book, Porta Argentariorum, which was published in 1939. In 1937, he joined the Victoria and Albert Museum (V&A) in London, having been appointed an assistant keeper in its Department of Metalwork. He developed an interest in foundry techniques and bronze figures during his two years at the V&A.

In 1939, Haynes was invited to join the staff of the British Museum by Bernard Ashmole, the newly-appointed Keeper of Greek and Roman Antiquities. On 11 April 1939, he was appointed assistant keeper in the Department of Greek and Roman Antiquities: he joined the department in the aftermath of a scandal involving the over-cleaning of the Elgin Marbles. With the outbreak of the Second World War, he was involved in the preparing and packing of the British Museum's extensive collection for safe storage.

=== Second World War ===
During the Second World War, Haynes was released by the British Museum for war work. On 11 September 1941, he enlisted in the Royal Artillery, British Army. He transferred to intelligence, and worked with the Intelligence Service in the United Kingdom. He also served abroad, having been assigned to the map room of General Harold Alexander during the Italian Campaign. As his intelligence work involved information that had been decoded via the cracked Enigma machine, he could not speak about it, and rarely spoke about his wider war work.

In either 1943 or 1945, he was appointed Antiquities Officer for Libya and was based in Tripoli. His duties were to record and preserve the sites of ancient Libya: this resulted in the publication of Ancient Tripolitania in 1946. This book was a guidebook aimed "primarily for the military tourist". It was layer revised and expanded to target a wider audience, and published as Antiquities of Tripolitania ten years later.

=== Post-war ===
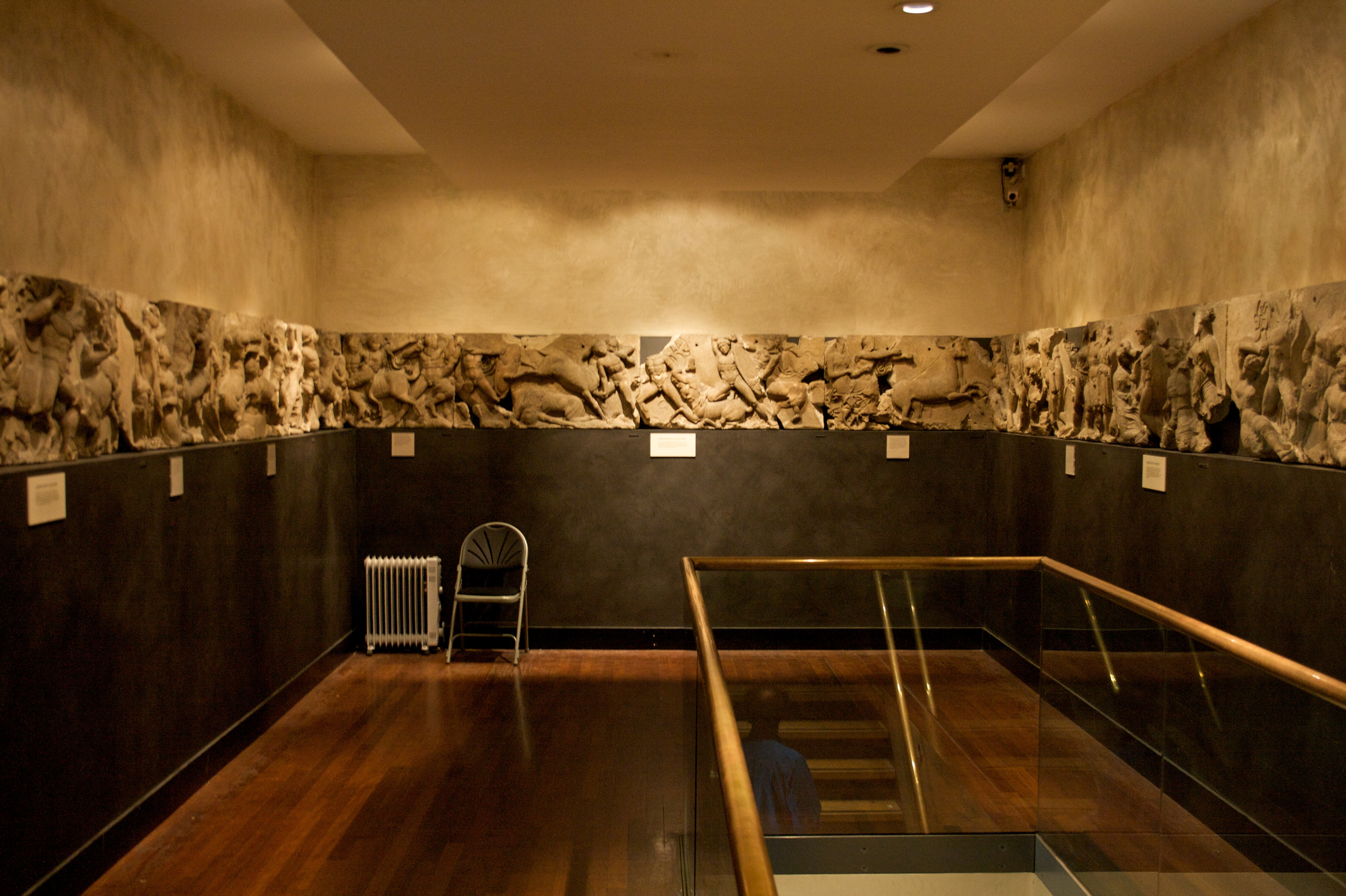
Gallery in the British Museum displaying the Bassae Frieze

Haynes returned to England in September 1946, and rejoined the British Museum. His first assignment was to return the antiquities that had been safely stored away to the museum. He was made Deputy Keeper of Greek and Roman Antiquities in 1954. When Ashmole moved to the University of Oxford in 1956, Haynes was selected to replace him as Keeper of Greek and Roman Antiquities and thereby head of the Department of Greek and Roman Antiquities. Among the galleries and exhibitions that he oversaw was the re-display of the Elgin Marbles in the Duveen Gallery which opened in 1962, and the creation of an exhibition on daily life in Ancient Greece and Rome. He also supervised building work that transformed ten ground floor rooms into fourteen rooms which held a chronological display of classical art and sculpture from the Greek Bronze Age through to the Roman Empire: this exhibition opened on 3 July 1969. Among the galleries created, was one built specifically for the Bassae Frieze with the same interior dimensions as the Temple of Apollo from which they originated.

Haynes main duties at the museum were curatorial and administrative. He did, however, have some time to continue academic pursuits. He wrote a number of books relating to various antiquities in his department, usually linked in with new exhibitions, and also had a number of papers published in learned journal. From 1972 to 1973, he was Geddes-Harrower Professor of Greek Art and Archaeology at the University of Aberdeen: this required the delivery of a lecture series which was later published as Greek Art and the Idea of Freedom. He also served as Chairman of the Society for Libyan Studies from 1973 to 1975.

Haynes retired from the British Museum in 1976, and was succeeded as Keeper of Greek and Roman Antiquities by Brian Cook.

== Personal life ==
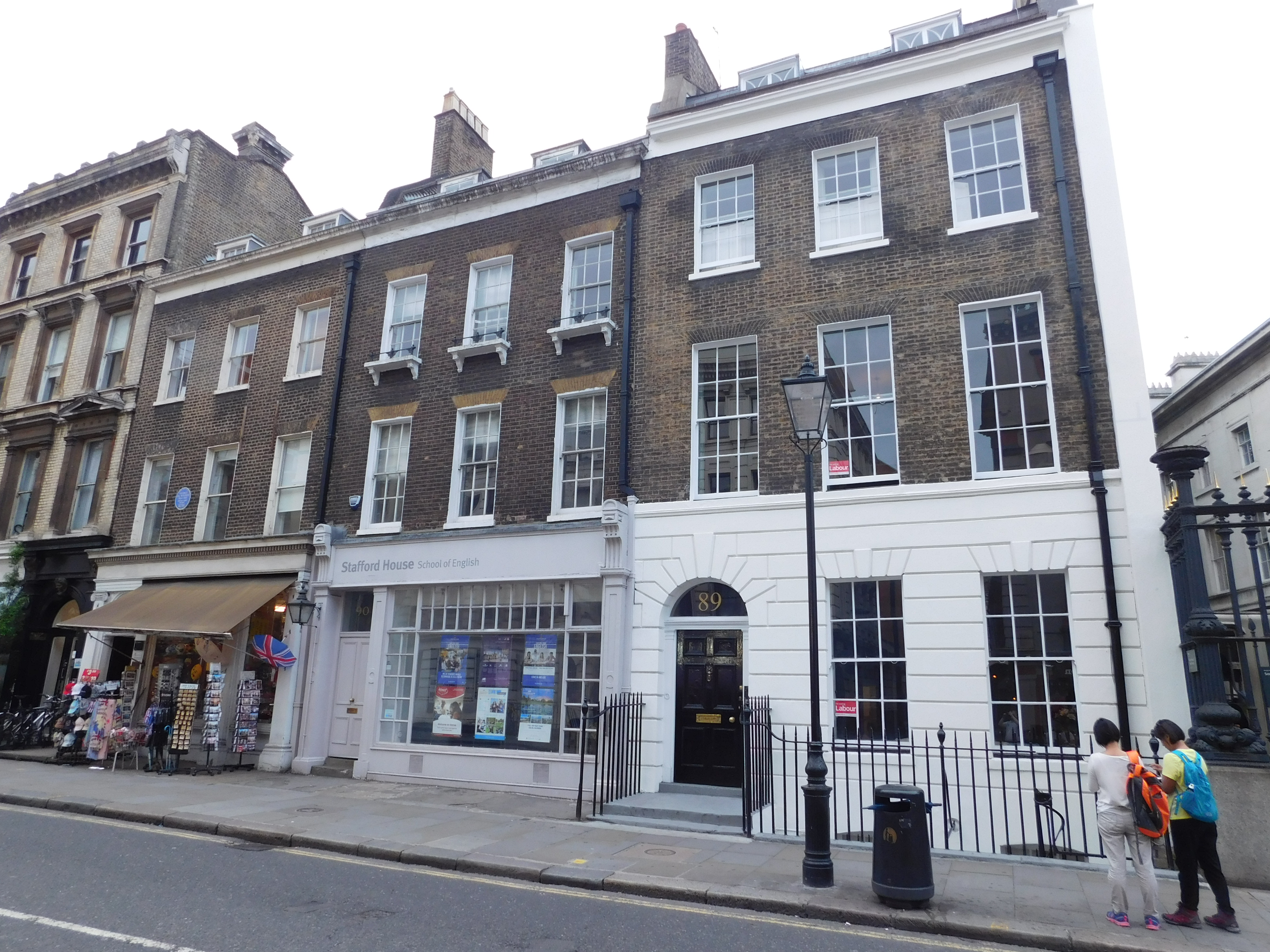
89 Great Russell Street

On 18 January 1951, Haynes married Dr Sybille Edith Overhoff. She is a classical archaeologist and noted Etruscologist. They did not have any children.

Following the Second World War and his marriage to Sybille, Haynes lived next to the British Museum at 89 Great Russell Street, London, and then at 24 Hereford Square, South Kensington. Following his retirement, they moved first to Dean, Oxfordshire, and then in 1985 to Banbury Road, Oxford.

Haynes led an active retirement, dedicating time to academic research and published a number of works. From September 1976 to June 1977, he was a member of the Institute for Advanced Study in Princeton, New Jersey. From 1979 to 1987, he was a visitor to the Ashmolean Museum: this is a position that forms part of the leadership and oversight of the museum.

On 27 September 1994, Haynes died of ischaemic heart disease at the Acland Hospital in Oxford; he was 81 years old. In his obituary in The Independent, he was described as "one of the last gentleman-scholars" to have worked at the British Museum.

== Honours ==
In 1953, Haynes was elected a corresponding member of the German Archaeological Institute: he was elected a full member in 1957.

== Selected works ==
- Haynes, D. E. L.; Hirst, P. E. D. (1939). Porta Argentariorum. London: MacMillan.
- Haynes, D. E. L. (1946). A Short historical and archaeological introduction to ancient Tripolitania. Government Press, British Administration Tripolitania.
- Haynes, D. E. L. (1956). An archaeological and historical guide to the pre-Islamic antiquities of Tripolitania. Antiquities Department of Tripolitania.
- Haynes, D. E. L. (1964). The Portland Vase. London: British Museum.
- Haynes, D. E. L. (1975). The Arundel marbles. Oxford: Ashmolean Museum. ISBN 978-0900090196.
- Haynes, D. E. L. (1981). Greek art and the idea of freedom. London: Thames and Hudson. ISBN 978-0500233313.
- Haynes, D. E. L. (1992). The technique of Greek bronze statuary. P. von Zabern. ISBN 978-3805314220.
