= Elfriede Knauer =

German classical archaeologist

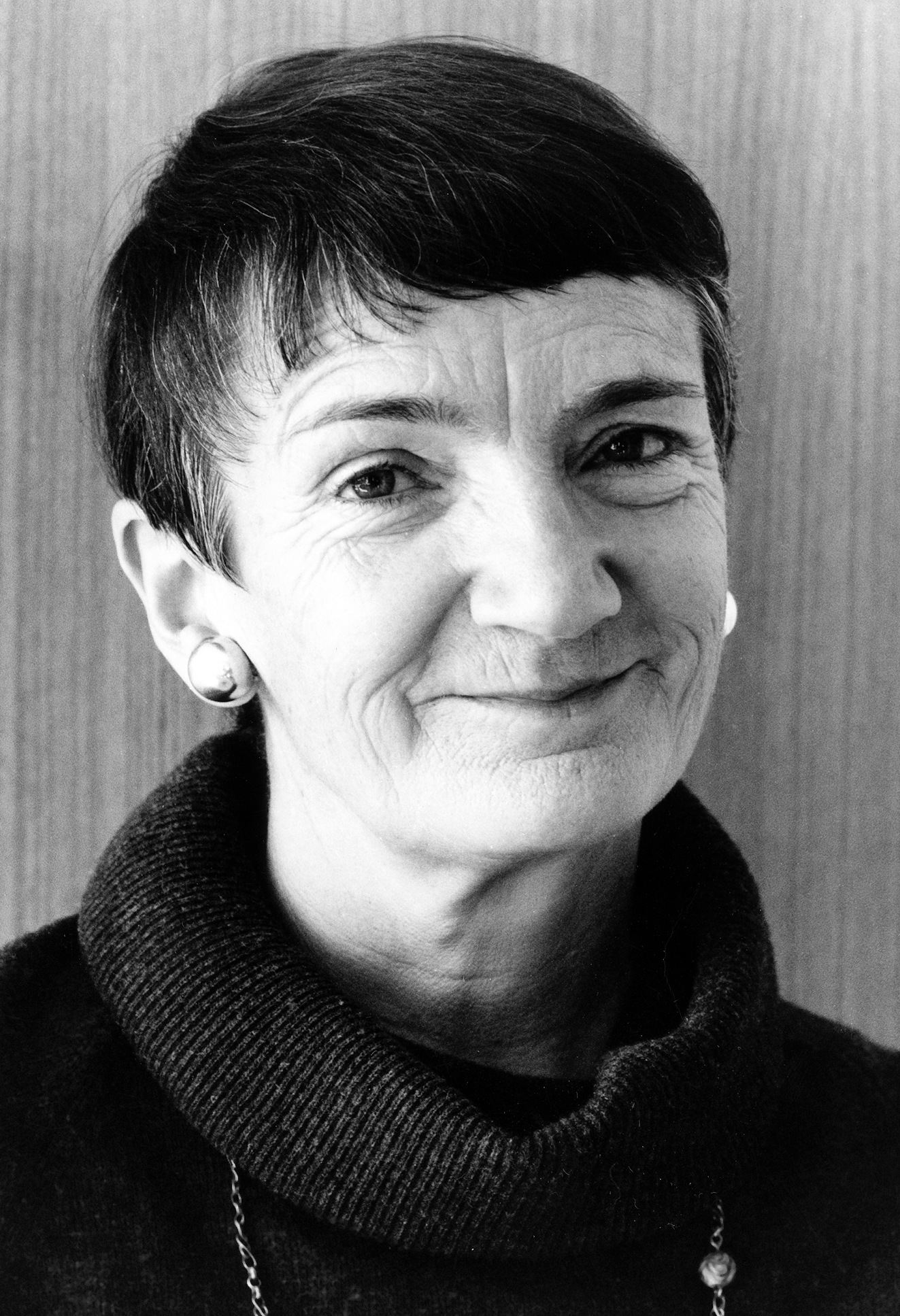
- Elfriede Knauer in the early 1980s
- Born: Elfriede Regina Overhoff; July 3, 1926; Leverkusen, Germany
- Died: June 7, 2010 (aged 83)
- Occupation: Classicist

Academic background
- Education: Goethe University Frankfurt

Elfriede Knauer (née Overhoff; 3 July 1926 – 7 June 2010) was a German Classicist and Ancient historian specialising in Greek vase painting, the survival of classical themes in Renaissance art, the history of cartography, classical influences on Central and East Asian art, and the Silk Road.

== Career ==
Knauer gained her PhD in 1951 on the subject of pre-Christian apsidal buildings in Greece and Italy from the Goethe University Frankfurt. It was supervised by Guido Kaschnitz von Weinberg. Elfriede, along with her husband Georg Nicolaus Knauer (a noted philologist) lived in West Berlin between 1954 and 1975; she worked as an assistant in the department of Greek and Roman Antiquities of the State Museums. The Knauers travelled widely together, particularly to the United States and in the Mediterranean countries. The Knauers both joined the University of Pennsylvania in early 1975, though rules at the time prevented husbands and wives from lecturing together – Elfriede was thus able to lecture only twice for the department of the history of art, in 1979 and 1981. This obstacle, however, has been cited as an important factor in allowing Elfriede nearly unlimited time for research and writing and contributed significantly to her substantial publication record. Elfried had written seventy-six books and articles at the time of her death. She was eventually appointed research associate in the Mediterranean Section at the Penn Museum and latterly served as a consulting scholar. In 1994, she was a visiting research fellow in classical archaeology and art history at the American Academy in Rome and was elected as a member of the American Philosophical Society in 1999. In 2002, she received the Director's Award for distinguished service to the Penn Museum.

Following her death, her archive of academic papers and photographs was donated to the Classical Art Research Centre at the University of Oxford.

== Personal life ==
Elfriede's grandfather Edmund Kloeppel was a board member of the Bayer company. She has a twin sister, Sybille (a noted Etruscologist). She married her husband Georg Nicolaus Knauer in 1951.

== Selected publications ==
- Knauer, E. R. 1965. Die Berliner Andokides-Vase. Stuttgart, Reclam Verl.
- Knauer, E. R. 1976. "Fragments of a cup by the Triptolemos Painter" Greek, Roman and Byzantine studies 17 p. 209-216.
- Knauer, E. R. 1998. The camel's load in life and death – iconography and ideology of Chinese pottery figurines from Han to Tang and their relevance to trade along the Silk Routes. Zurich, Akanthus.

== See also ==
- Triptolemos Painter
