= Triptolemos Painter =

Ancient Greek vase painter

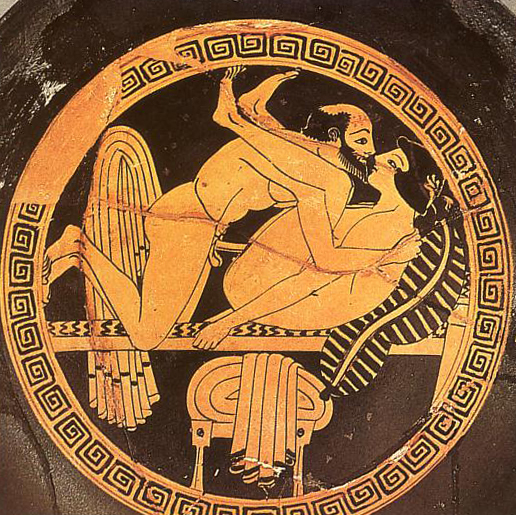
Erotic scene, interior image on a drinking cup, circa 470 v.Chr. Tarquinia, Museo Nazionale.

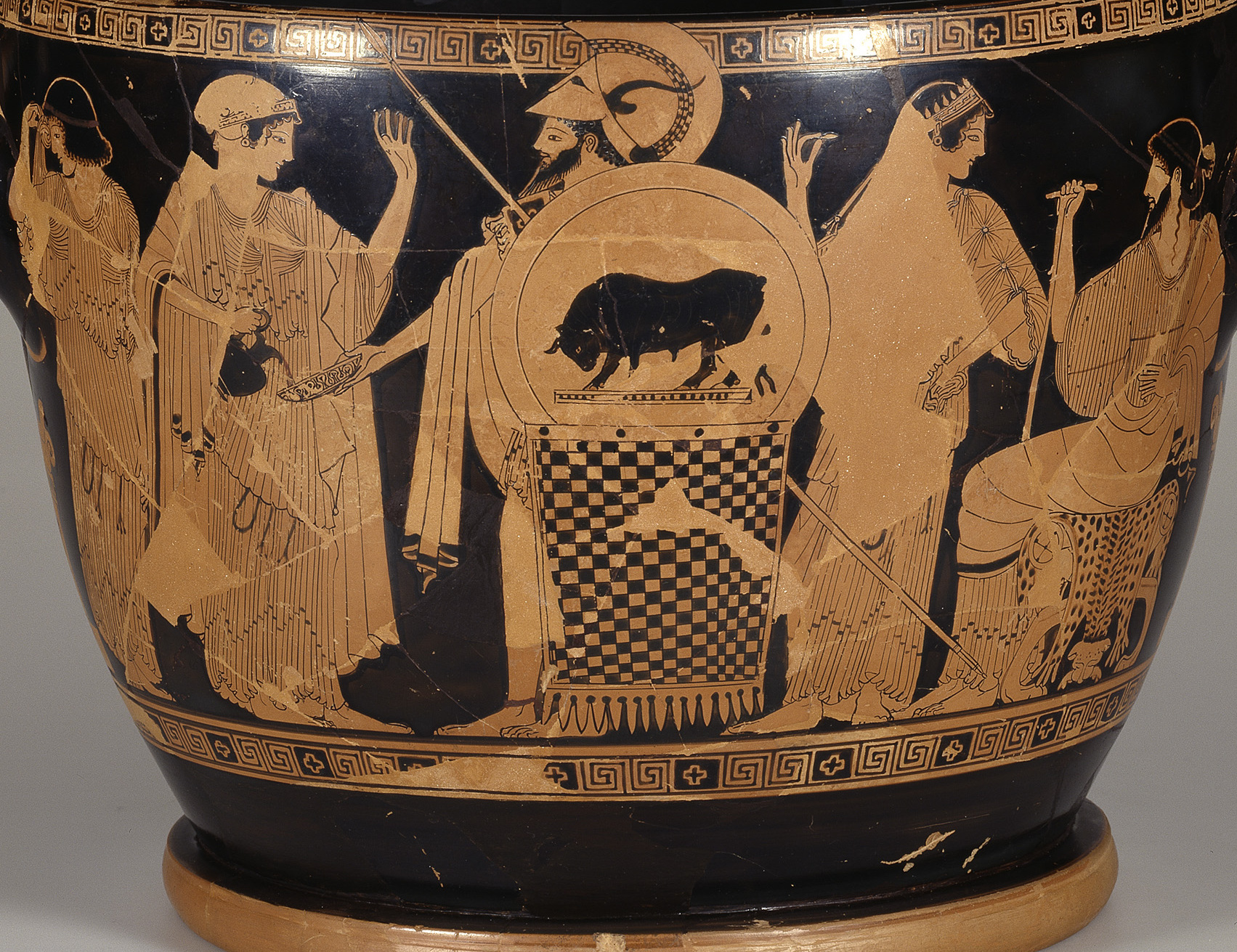
Departing warrior on a skyphos, Triptolemos Painter, 1st quarter of the 5th century BC

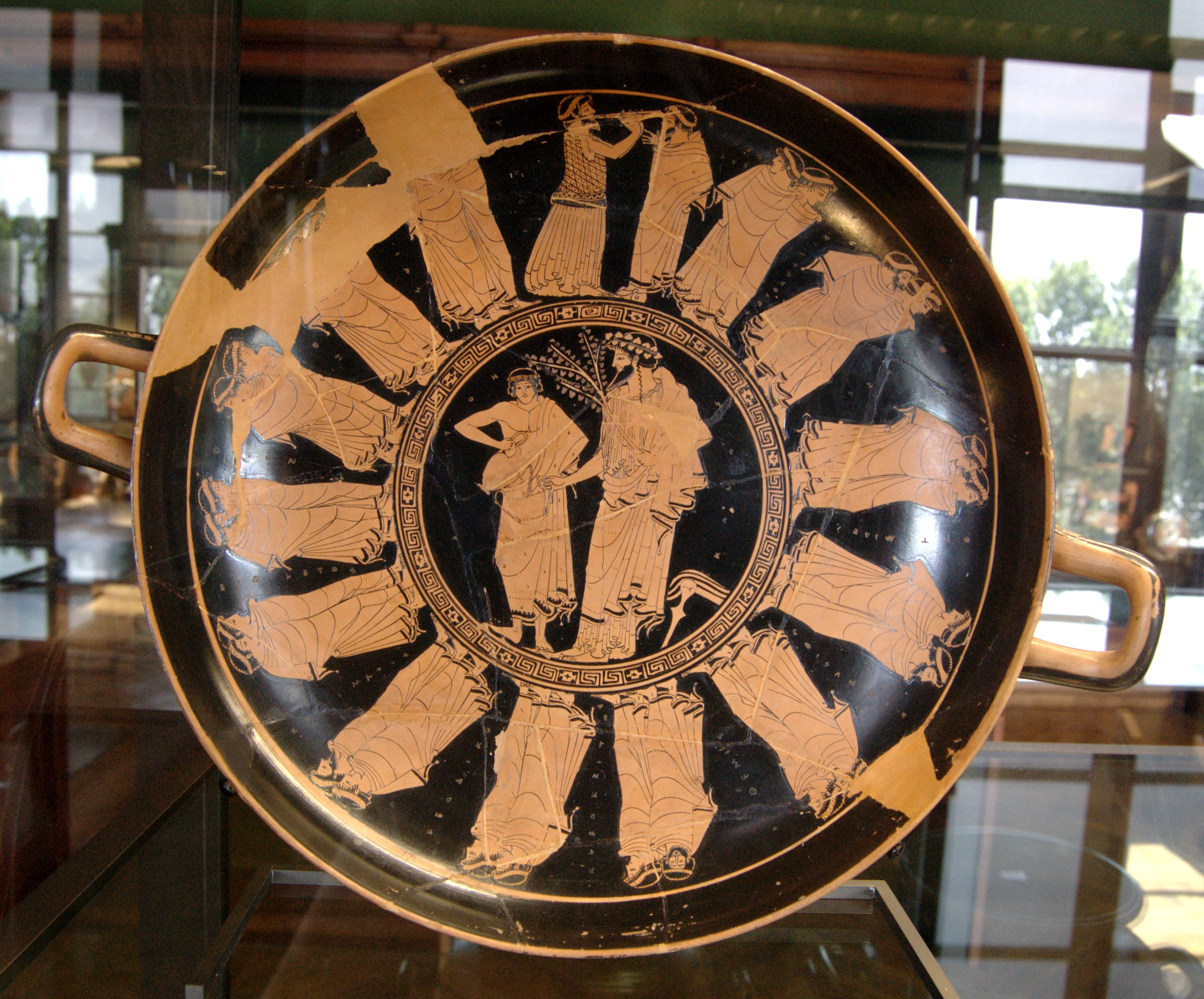
Procession of men, and youth pouring wine for Dionysos, interior of a kylix. Louvre, Paris

The Triptolemos Painter was an ancient Greek vase painter, belonging to the Attic red-figure style. He was active in Athens between 490 and 470 BC. His real name is not known. He started working in the workshop of Euphronios, where he was probably taught by Douris. Later, he also worked for the potters Brygos, Hieron and Python. Initially, his style was strongly influenced by Archaic art. His later works are mediocre in quality. Nonetheless, his repertoire is broad, reaching from the Apaturia procession via erotic scenes and Theban scenes to the departure of Triptolemos (his name vase).

== Bibliography ==
- Margot Schmidt: Der Zorn des Achill. Ein Stamnos des Triptolemosmalers. In: Opus nobile. Festschrift zum 60. Geburtstag von Ulf Jantzen (Wiesbaden 1969) p. 141-152.
- Elfriede R. Knauer: Ein Skyphos des Triptolemosmalers (Berlin 1973) (Winckelmannsprogramme der Archäologischen Gesellschaft zu Berlin, 125).
- Elfriede R. Knauer: Fragments of a cup by the Triptolemos Painter In: Greek, Roman and Byzantine studies 17 (1976) p. 209-216.
- Elfriede R. Knauer: Two cups by the Triptolemos Painter. New light on two Athenian festivals? In: Archäologischer Anzeiger 1996, p. 221-246.
- Elfriede R. Knauer: Fragments of a cup by the Triptolemos Painter from the Undset-Blindheim Collection. In: Acta ad archaeologiam et artium historiam pertinentia s.a. 9 (1997) p. 17-19.
