= Emil Knauer =

Austrian gynecologist and obstetrician

- Born: 27 February 1867; Preßburg, Austria-Hungary
- Died: 11 May 1935 (aged 68); Graz, Austria
- Education: University of Vienna
- Scientific career
- Fields: Gynaecology; Obstetrics
- Workplaces: University of Vienna, University of Graz

Emil Knauer (27 February 1867 – 14 May 1935) was an Austrian gynecologist and obstetrician.

== Career ==
Knauer was born in 1867 as the son of baker Georg Knauer (1822–1878) and his wife Karoline (1829–1905). After completing his schooling in his hometown, he studied medicine at the University of Vienna from autumn 1885 onwards.
In Vienna he completed training in pathological anatomy under Johann Kundrat and in internal medicine under Hermann Nothnagel. In 1891 Knauer got his doctorate and worked from October 1891 at the surgical clinic of Theodor Billroth.
In April 1893 he went to II. University Women's Hospital under Rudolf Chrobak, where he qualified in July 1901 for obstetrics and gynaecology habilitation.
Knauer had already published his first experimental work on hormonal control of sexual functions as an assistant. They led to the revision of the previous theory of a nerval reflex effect between ovulation and menstruation. By transplanting ovaries in rabbits he suspected the existence of a chemical substance produced in the ovaries and an internal secretion of the organ. His findings were soon confirmed by experiments of the young Josef Halban at the I. University Women's Hospital Vienna.
Knauer, Halban and Ludwig Fraenkel, who proved the endocrinological function of the corpus luteum, are regarded today as the founders of gynaecological endocrinology.
In April 1903 he succeeded Alfons von Rosthorn, who moved to the University Heidelberg, as professor at the University of Graz.
Here he mainly dedicated himself to the extension of the clinic, which was rebuilt in 1912 according to his plans. He was the academic teacher of Paul Mathes, Hermann Knaus and Hans Zacherl.
He managed the university women's clinic for almost 32 years until his death in 1935. He rejected several calls to other universities. He was also a member of the Academic Senate for 17 years.
Emil Knauer was married and father of 8 children.

== Selected publications ==
- Knauer, Emil (1896). "Some experiments on ovarian transplantation in rabbits". Zentralblatt für Gynäkologie. 20: 524–8.
- Emil Knauer: For ovarian transplantation (birth at the normal end of pregnancy after ovarian transplantation in rabbits). Zentralbl Gynäkol 22 (1898), pp. 201–203
- Emil Knauer: Ovarian Transplantation (Experimental Study). Arch Gynecol 60 (1900), pp. 322–376

== Literature ==
- Hans Zacherl: In memoriam Hofrat Prof. Dr. Emil Knauer. Monatsschr Geburtshilfe Gynäkol 99 (1935), pp. 379–380
- Hermann Knaus: Emil Knauer, Graz †. Arch Gynäk 159 (1935), p. 429, DOI:10.1007/BF02280559
- Victor Cornelius Medvei: The birth of endocrinology Part III. In: The History of Clinical Endocrinology: A Comprehensive Account of Endocrinology from Earliest Times to the Present Day. CRC Press, 1993, ISBN 9781850704270, p. 203
- Otto Weininger: Sex, Science, and Self in Imperial Vienna. In: Chandak Sengoopta: The Chicago Series on Sexuality, History, and Society. University of Chicago Press, 2000, ISBN 9780226748672, p. 77
