= Marie Luise Kaschnitz =

German short story writer, novelist and poet (1901–1974)

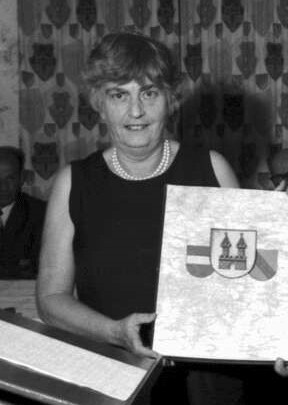
- M. L. Kaschnitz (19 August 1967)
- Born: 31 January 1901; Karlsruhe, Baden-Württemberg, Germany
- Died: 10 October 1974 (aged 73); Rome, Italy
- Occupations: writer and poet
- Partner: Guido Kaschnitz von Weinberg (m. 1925–1958)
- Children: Iris Schnebel-Kaschnitz
- Writing career
- Language: German
- Notable awards: Georg Büchner Prize (1955)

Marie Luise Kaschnitz (born Marie Luise von Holzing-Berslett; 31 January 1901 – 10 October 1974) was a German short story writer, novelist, essayist and poet. She is considered to be one of the leading post-war German poets.

== Biography ==
She was born in Karlsruhe. She married archaeologist Guido Freiherr Von Kaschnitz-Weinberg (the author of The Mediterranean Foundations of Ancient Art) in 1925, and travelled with him on archaeological expeditions.

She received high praise for her short stories, many of which were inspired by events in her life, complemented by her personal reminiscences. These stories were collected in books such as Orte and Engelsbrücke. She enjoyed travel greatly and her tales make use of diverse settings. They are thoughtful in nature, rather than eventful, often dealing with particular stages in a woman's life or a relationship. Her main collection is Lange Schatten ("Long Shadows"). Her favorite story was 1961's "Das dicke Kind".

Her post-war essay collection in Menschen und Dinge 1945 established her reputation in Germany. Her poems dealt with the war and the early post-war period, often expressing a yearning for a peaceful past, but also hope for the future. In the volume Dein Schweigen – meine Stimme she dealt with the death of her husband. After 1960 she became influenced by Pablo Neruda.

She briefly taught poetics at the University of Frankfurt. She was a member of PEN. She won many prizes, including the Georg Büchner Prize in 1955 and the Roswitha Prize in 1973. She was nominated for the Nobel Prize in Literature in 1965 and 1967. She died, aged 73, in Rome. The Marie Luise Kaschnitz Prize is named in her honor.

== Works ==
- Liebe beginnt (1988) – novel
- Elissa (1988) – novel
- Griechische Mythen (1988) – Greek myths
- Menschen und Dinge 1988. Zwölf Essays (1988) – essays
- Gedichte (1947) – poetry
- Totentanz und Gedichte zur Zeit (1947) – a play and poetry
- Gustave Courbet. Roman eines Malerlebens (also: Die Wahrheit, nicht der Traum) (1950) – novel
- Zukunftsmusik (1950) – poetry
- Ewige Stadt (1952) – poetry about Rome
- Das dicke Kind (1952) – short stories
- Engelsbrücke. Römische Betrachtungen (1955) – reflections
- Das Haus der Kindheit (1956) – novel
- Der Zöllner Matthäus (1956) – radio play (script)
- Lange Schatten (1960) – short stories
- Ein Gartenfest (1961) – radio play (script)
- Dein Schweigen – meine Stimme (1962) – poetry
- Hörspiele (1962) – radio plays
- Einer von zweien (1962)
- Wohin denn ich : Aufzeichnungen (1963) – reflections
- Überallnie (1965) – selected poems
- Ein Wort weiter (1965) – poetry
- Ferngespräche (1966) – short stories
- Beschreibung eines Dorfes (1966) – experimental novel
- Tage, Tage, Jahre (1968) – reflections
- Vogel Rock. Unheimliche Geschichten (1969) – stories
- Steht noch dahin (1970) – autobiographical reflections
- Zwischen Immer und Nie. Gestalten und Themen der Dichtung (1971) – essays on poetry
- Gespräche im All (1971) – radio plays
- Eisbären (1972) – selected stories
- Kein Zauberspruch (1972) – poems 1962–1972
- Gesang vom Menschenleben (1974) – poetry
- Florens. Eichendorffs Jugend (1974)
- Der alte Garten. Ein modernes Märchen (1975)
- Orte (1975) – autobiographical reflections
- Die drei Wanderer (1980) – ballad
- Jennifers Träume. Unheimliche Geschichten (1984) – stories
- Notizen der Hoffnung (1984) – essays
- Orte und Menschen (1986) – reflections, posthumous
- Menschen und Dinge (1986) – reflections, posthumous
- Liebesgeschichten (ed. E. Borchers) (1986) – love stories
- Tagebücher aus den Jahren 1936–1966 (2000) – diaries

=== British/American editions ===
- The House of Childhood (Das Haus der Kindheit)
- Circe's Mountain – story selections
- Whether or Not (Steht noch dahin)
- Selected Later Poems of Marie Luise Kaschnitz (ed. Lisel Mueller)
- Long Shadows (Lange Schatten)
