= Olof Gigon =

Swiss teacher and classical philologist (1912–1998)

Olof Alfred Gigon (28 January 1912 – 18 June 1998) was a Swiss classical philologist. He is particularly known as a historian of philosophy and translator of ancient philosophical texts.

== Biography ==
Olof Gigon, son of the physician Alfred Gigon (1883-1975), was born and grew up in Basel, where he studied classical and oriental philology. He spent one semester at the Ludwig-Maximilians-Universität München in the years 1932 and 1933. During his studies, he learned Arabic, Persian and Turkish. Gigon received his doctorate in 1934 with the dissertation research on Heraclitus. He spent the next two years studying in Paris. In 1937, he qualified as an assistant professor with an investigation of Theophrastus's About the winds.

In 1939, at the age of 27 years, Gigon was called a professor of classical studies at the University of Fribourg. After the Second World War, from 1946 to 1948, he was a guest professor teaching at the Ludwig-Maximilians-Universität München. In 1948, Gigon was appointed professor of Latin Studies at the University of Bern, where he worked until his retirement in 1982 and beyond. In the academic year 1966-67 he was rector of the University. He received in 1966 the honorary doctorate from the University of Gothenburg and in 1974 the National and Kapodistrian University of Athens. In Athens, he spent his last years.

== Research ==
Gigon was one of the most important historians of philosophy of the 20th century and dealt with the whole range of ancient philosophy. His books have been translated into many languages. An example of his work is the demystification of the figure of Socrates. Gigon pointed out that the Socrates, as represented by his student Plato, is a medium of Plato's own worldview. Gigon was also of the opinion that all problems of modern philosophy were recognizable already in ancient philosophy, even if sometimes only in their infancy.

== Works ==
Gigon's main writings are:

- The origins of Greek philosophy (1945)
- Basic problems of ancient philosophy (1959)
- Ancient culture and Christianity (1967)
