= Georg Nicolaus Knauer =

German-American Vergilian philologist

Georg Nicolaus Knauer (26 February 1926 – 28 October 2018) was a German-American Vergilian philologist who was a Professor in the Classics Department of the University of Pennsylvania. He also previously taught at the Freie Universität Berlin from 1954 to 1974 before becoming a Penn professor the following year. He is best known for Die Aeneis und Homer: Studien zur poetischen Technik Vergils mit Listen der Homerzitate in der Aeneis, published in 1964 by Vandenhoeck & Ruprecht in Göttingen, which is regarded as a comprehensive work on the influence of Homer upon Vergil. That work explains the similarities between the Aeneid and Homer's Iliad and Odyssey, and contains a comprehensive index of similarities between those works.

In 1951, Knauer married his late wife, Elfriede R. "Kezia" Knauer, who was also a professor emerita at Penn and an expert in the Silk Road working with the Penn Museum before she died in 2010.
