= Otis Fellows =

American scholar

Otis Edward Fellows (1909 – May 15, 1993) was an American scholar of 18th-century French literature. He taught in the humanities for almost forty years at Columbia University.

Born in Hanover, Connecticut, Fellows died on May 15, 1993, in Portland, Oregon, at the age of 84, but lived for most of his scholarly career in Morningside Heights in New York City. He earned his Ph.D. in Romance languages in 1936 at Brown University. Fellows began teaching at Columbia University in 1939, attaining the rank of professor in 1958. From 1970 to 1977 held an endowed chair, the Avalon Foundation Professorship.

== Work ==
Fellows's work on Denis Diderot was considered authoritative. He founded Diderot Studies, published in Geneva, in 1949, and was its editor for many years. Diderot, a biography and appreciative study of the editor of the French Encyclopédie, was published in 1977. Fellows co-edited a widely used anthology of 18th-century French literature entitled The Age of Enlightenment with Norman L. Torrey, his colleague at Columbia. Fellows also wrote From Voltaire to "La Nouvelle Critique": Problems and Personalities (1970) and co-authored a biography of Buffon with Stephen Milliken. In 1953 he edited a collection of detective stories by Georges Simenon.

== Recognition ==
Fellows was a Fellow of the Royal Society of Arts. He was the recipient of a Guggenheim Fellowship in 1959. He was awarded the Médaille de Chevalier dans l'Ordre des Palmes Académiques by the French government in 1959 for his work as an American intelligence officer during the Second World War, and for his scholarship.
