= EnviroLink Network =

EnviroLink Network, Inc
- Formation: October 1, 1991; 35 years ago
- Purpose: Providing a clearinghouse of environmental information on the Internet and assisting mission-related organizations in the adoption of emerging technologies.
- Headquarters: Pittsburgh, Pennsylvania
- Region served: Worldwide
- Method: Website and virtual worlds such as Second Life
- Key people: Joshua Knauer, Founder
- Endowment: $0
- Staff: 0 paid employees
- Volunteers: 15
- Website: https://www.envirolink.org/

The EnviroLink Network serves as a clearinghouse for environmental information on the Internet, as well as providing free services to help progressive organizations adopt emerging technologies. The EnviroLink Network with EIN 25-1721380 tax exempt status was revoked on the 5th of May 2012 with revocation posting date of 11 February 2013.

== Function ==
The EnviroLink Network is a non-profit organization providing environmental resources on the Internet. EnviroLink is a grass-roots on-line community uniting millions of people in over 150 countries on six continents. Services include the EnviroLink web site, chat rooms, bulletin boards, electronic mailing lists, and in partnership with the Institute for Global Communications, provides hosting services to nonprofit organizations. EnviroLink provides the largest worldwide forum for the global exchange of environmental information supplied by a vast community of participants.

== Programs ==
EnviroLink's main programs operate under the two core principles by which it was founded: to be a clearinghouse for environmental information and to provide free Internet services to non-profit organizations within the environmental movement. The mission is achieved through the following programs:

- The EnviroLink database and website provides users with a comprehensive listing of organizations, publications, educational resources, government agencies, and more on several hundred environmental topics in the EnviroLink database.
- EnviroLink News Service is a weekly service and mailing list, which provides quick summaries of the top environmental news stories from around the world.
- The EnviroLink Forum stimulates an active exchange of information and ideas within the environmental community through bulletin boards and real-time chats. Currently, the forum is visited by over 8,000 registered EnviroLink Forum users. In addition, EnviroLink offers free services for other organizations to host and customize their own on-line forums.
- EnviroLink in Virtual Worlds: EnviroLink provides free hosting services to mission-related organizations in Second Life.
