= Guido Kaschnitz von Weinberg =

Austrian-German archaeologist and art historian

- Kaschnitz von Weinberg c. 1950
- Born: June 28, 1890; Vienna, Austria-Hungary
- Died: September 1, 1958 (aged 68); Frankfurt, West Germany
- Education: University of Vienna
- Scientific career
- Fields: Archaeology
- Workplaces: University of Marburg; University of Königsberg; Goethe University Frankfurt

Guido Kaschnitz von Weinberg (28 June 1890 in Vienna – 1 September 1958 in Frankfurt am Main) was an Austrian-German archaeologist and art historian. He was the husband of writer Marie Luise Kaschnitz.

He studied at the University of Vienna, where one of his influences was art historian Max Dvořák. From 1910 to 1913 he took part in excavations in Dalmatia and participated in study trips to Greece, North Africa and Egypt. In 1913 he obtained his doctorate from Vienna with a dissertation-thesis on Greek vase painting. After performing military service in World War I, he worked for several years in Munich.

From 1923 he worked in Rome, where he conducted research at the German Archaeological Institute (DAI) and cataloged ancient Greek art at the Vatican. In 1932 he was appointed professor of classical archaeology at the University of Königsberg. Later on, he held professorships at the universities of Marburg (1937–1940) and Frankfurt (1940–1956). In 1953 he was named director of the DAI in Rome, where he resumed publication of the "Römische Mitteilungen", a journal that had been in hiatus since 1944.

As an art historian, he used structure analysis (Strukturforschung) rather than the concept of style when determining works of ancient art. From a standpoint of methodology, he was the nearest follower of Alois Riegl — with his "structural analysis" being considered a form of Riegl's notion of Kunstwollen ("will to art").

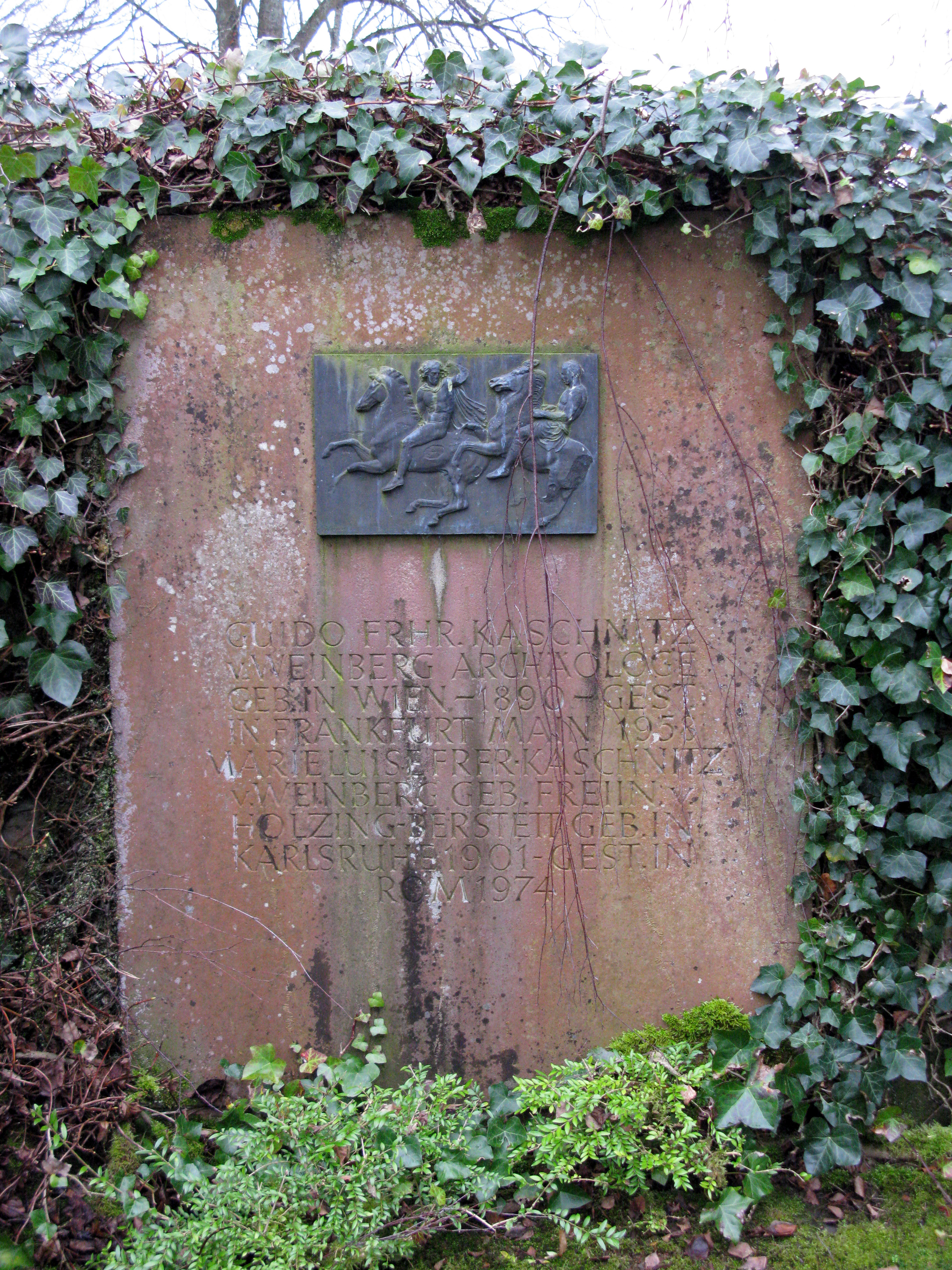
Gravesite of Guido Kaschnitz von Weinberg and Marie Luise Kaschnitz in Bollschweil

== Selected works ==
- Bemerkungen zur Struktur der ägyptischen Plastik (1933) – Remarks on the structure of Egyptian sculpture.
- Marcus Antonius, Domitian, Christus (1938) – Mark Antony, Domitian, Jesus Christ.
- Die mittelmeerischen grundlagen der antiken kunst (1944) – The Mediterranean foundation of ancient art.
- Die Grundlagen der antiken Kunst (2 volumes, 1944) – The basics of ancient art.
- Ludwig Curtius: das wissenschaftliche Werk (1958) – Ludwig Curtius, scientific work.
- Das Schöpferische in der römischen Kunst (1961) – Creativity in Roman art.
- Römische Kunst (3 volumes, 1961; edited and published by Helga Heintze) – Roman art.
- Die Baukunst im Kaiserreich (1963; edited and published by Helga Heintze) – Architecture of the Empire.
- Ausgewählte Schriften (3 volumes, 1965; edited and published by Helga Heintze) – Selected writings.
- Kleine Schriften zur Struktur (1965; edited and published by Helga Heintze) – Smaller works on structure.
- Mittelmeerische Kunst : eine Darstellung ihrer Strukturen (1965; edited and published by Peter H. von Blanckenhagen and Helga Heintze) – Mediterranean art: a presentation of its structures.
