= 1906 Nobel Prize in Literature =

- Giosuè Carducci
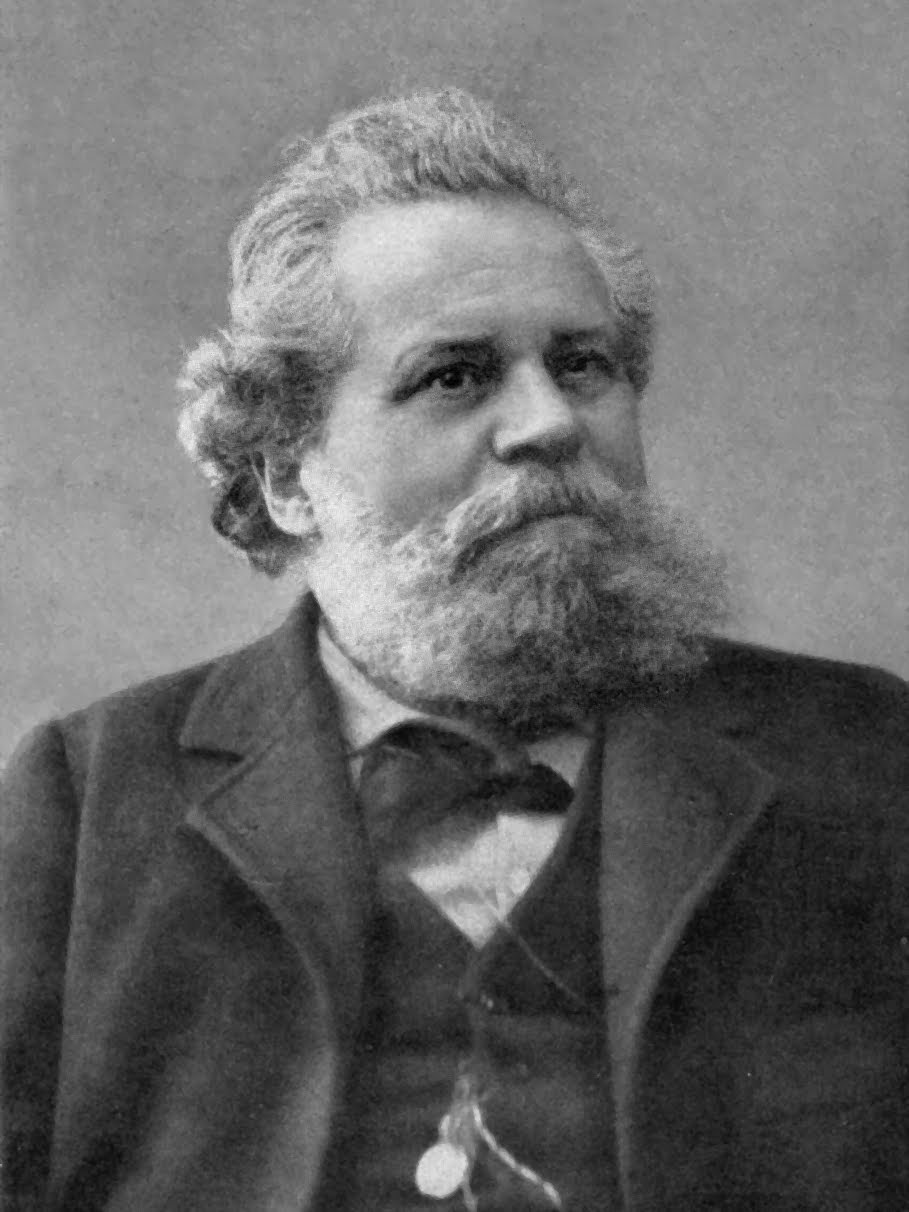
- "not only in consideration of his deep learning and critical research, but above all as a tribute to the creative energy, freshness of style, and lyrical force which characterize his poetic masterpieces."
- Date: 8 November 1906 (announcement); 10 December 1906 (ceremony)
- Location: Stockholm, Sweden
- Presented by: Swedish Academy
- First award: 1901
- Website: Official website

The 1906 Nobel Prize in Literature was awarded to the Italian poet Giosuè Carducci (1835–1907) "not only in consideration of his deep learning and critical research, but above all as a tribute to the creative energy, freshness of style, and lyrical force which characterize his poetic masterpieces." He was the first Italian author to receive the prize and was followed by Grazia Deledda in 1926.

== Laureate ==
Carducci started composing poetry while he was young, influenced by both the poets of his own time and those he had studied in the ancient and Italian periods. Rime ("Rhymes", 1857) was his debut book of poetry. In his active life he became an atheist, and the provocative poem Inno a Satana ("Hymn to Satan", 1865) is where he best displays his criticism of Christianity. Carducci confessed his sins and was reconciled to the Catholic Church in 1895. His other well-known poetry collections include Primavere elleniche ("Hellenic Springs", 1872), Odi barbare ("Barbarian Odes", 1877), and Giambi ed Epodi ("Giambi and Epodi", 1882).

== Deliberations ==
=== Nominations ===
Carducci was nominated on 9 occasions starting in 1902 by Antonio Fogazzaro, an Italian Senator and author. In 1906, he received four nominations from academics and writers which eventually led him to becoming the year's recipient.

The Nobel Committee of the Swedish Academy received 54 nominations for 24 writers among them Leo Tolstoy, Algernon Charles Swinburne, Selma Lagerlöf (awarded in 1909), Jaroslav Vrchlický, Georg Brandes, and Antonio Fogazzaro. Eleven of the nominees were nominated first-time such as Pedro Pablo Figueroa, Gaston Boissier, Louis Franck, George Lansing Raymond, Borden Parker Bowne, Angelo de Gubernatis, and William Booth. Selma Lagerlöf was the only female nominee recorded.

The authors Émile Boutmy, Eliza Brightwen, Ferdinand Brunetière, Ellen Mary Clerke, Anne Ross Cousin, José María de Pereda, Paul Laurence Dunbar, Max Eyth, Giuseppe Giacosa, Alexander Kielland, Jean Lorrain, Agnes Catherine Maitland, Bartolomé Mitre, Vasile Pogor, Charlotte Riddell, Hendrik Jan Schimmel, Elizabeth Missing Sewell, Eduard von Hartmann, and Adeline Dutton Whitney died in 1906 without having been nominated for the prize.

Official list of nominees and their nominators for the prize
No.	Nominee	Country	Genre(s)	Nominator(s)
1	Max Bewer (Note: Bewer: Germanisch-religiöser Dichter ("Germanic Religious Poet")) (1861–1921)	Germany	poetry, songwriting, essays	Max Stoye (?); Henry Thode (1857–1920); Friedrich Kluge (1856–1926)
2	Gaston Boissier (1823–1908)	France	history, essays, translation	Jacobus Johannes Hartman (1851–1924)
3	William Booth (Note: Booth: In Darkest England and the Way Out (1890)) (1829–1912)	Great Britain	theology, essays, songwriting	Otto Classen (1868–1939) (Note: This nomination was later declared invalid by the Nobel committee because Classen was found to be ineligible.)
4	Borden Parker Bowne (Note: B. P. Bowne, W. Neidig and G. L. Raymond were the first three nominees for the Nobel Prize in Literature from United States.) (1847–1910)	United States	philosophy, theology, essays	Albert Knudson (1873–1953); Henry MacCracken (1840–1918); William Henry Crawford (1855–1944); Caroline Borden (?) (Note: Miss Caroline Borden is the sister of Borden Parker Bowne.)
5	Georg Brandes (1842–1927)	Denmark	literary criticism, essays	Troels Frederik Lund (1840–1921) (Note: The nomination was made by Troels Frederik Troels-Lund and 17 other members of the Royal Danish Academy of Sciences and Letters.)
6	Giosuè Carducci (1835–1907)	Italy	poetry, literary criticism, biography, essays	Rodolfo Renier (1857–1915); Johan Vising (1855–1942); Carl Bildt (1850–1931); Ugo Balzani (1847–1916)
7	Houston Stewart Chamberlain (Note: Chamberlain: "for his work on Immanuel Kant.") (1855–1927)	Great Britain; Germany	philosophy	Leopold von Schroeder (1851–1920)
8	Angelo de Gubernatis (1840–1913)	Italy	drama, essays, philology, poetry	Francesco Lorenzo Pullè (1850–1934); Angelo Valdarnini (1847–1930); Paolo Boselli (1838–1932); Gaspare Finali (1829–1914); Tancredi Canonico (1828–1908)
9	Pedro Pablo Figueroa (1857–1909)	Chile	history, biography, essays	Leonardo Eliz y Las Rosas (1861–1939) (Note: This nomination was later declared invalid by the Nobel Committee because Eliz was found to be ineligible.)
10	Antonio Fogazzaro (1842–1911)	Italy	novel, poetry, short story	Carl Bildt (1850–1931) (Note: Carl Bildt nominated Antonio Fogazzaro if Giosué Carducci could not receive the Prize.)
11	Louis Franck (1868–1937)	Belgium	law	Ernest Nys (1851–1920)
12	Gerhart Hauptmann (1862–1946)	Germany	drama, novel	35 German and Austrian professors and members of societies (Note: The nomination was made by 35 German and Austrian professors and members of societies authorized to nominate a candidate for the Nobel Prize.)
13	Max Haushofer (Note: Haushofer: Die Verbannten ("The Banned")) (1840–1907)	Germany	poetry, drama, short story, essays	Emil Milan (1859–1917) (Note: This nomination was later declared invalid by the Nobel committee because Milan was found to be ineligible.)
14	Selma Lagerlöf (1858–1940)	Sweden	novel, short story	Fredrik Wulff (1845–1930); Adolf Noreen (1854–1925); Anton Christian Bang (1840–1913)
15	George Meredith (1828–1909)	Great Britain	novel, poetry	John Collier (1850–1934)
16	John Morley (1838–1923)	Great Britain	biography, literary criticism, essays	John Lubbock, 1st Baron Avebury (1858–1929)
17	Lewis Morris (1833–1907)	Great Britain	poetry, songwriting, essays	Herbert Warren (1853–1930); John Rhys (1840–1915); Francis St. John Thackeray (1832–1919); Thomas Francis Roberts (1860–1919); William Jackson (1838–1931)
18	William Jonathan Neidig (Note: Neidig: The First Wardens and Other Poems (1901)) (1870–1955)	United States	poetry, short story, essays	Henry Burrowes Lathrop (1867–1936)
19	George Lansing Raymond (Note: Lansing Raymond: The Essentials of Aesthetics (1906)) (1839–1929)	United States	essays, philosophy	Charles Needham (1848–1935); William Allen Wilbur (1864–1945); Mitchell Carroll (1870–1925); Hermann Schoenfeld (1861–1926); Charles Clinton Swisher (1856–1940 )
20	Albert Sorel (1842–1906)	France	history, essays	René Bazin (1853–1932); Gabriel Hanotaux (1853–1944); Frédéric Masson (1847–1923)
21	Algernon Charles Swinburne (1837–1909)	Great Britain	poetry, drama, literary criticism, novel	35 members of the Society of Authors
22	Leo Tolstoy (1828–1910)	Russia	novel, short story, drama, poetry	Ludovic Halévy (1837–1908)
23	Jaroslav Vrchlický (1853–1912)	Austria-Hungary (Czechoslovakia)	poetry, drama, translation	Bohuslav Raýman (1852–1910); Josef Hlávka (1831–1908); Arnošt Kraus (1859–1943)
24	Joseph Viktor Widmann (Note: Widmann: Der Heilige und die Thiere ("The Saint and the Animals", 1905) and Maikäferkomödie ("May Beetle's Comedy")) (1842–1911)	Switzerland	novel, short story, drama, literary criticism	Otto Benndorf (1838–1907); Theodor Gomperz (1832–1912); Wilhelm von Hartel (1839–1907); Jakob Minor (1855–1912); Erich Schmidt (1853–1913)

=== Prize decision ===
In their report to the Swedish Academy dated 24 September 1906, the Nobel committee unanimously proposed that that year's Nobel Prize in Literature should be awarded to the Italian poet Giosuè Carducci: "A learned literary historian, nourished by antiquity, Dante and Petrarch, Carducci is in his own right a poet (...) Now that his poems are of unusually high aesthetic value, he can be considered to be highly deserving of the Nobel Prize in Literature, for which the committee now proposes him. The Swedish Academy thereby pays tribute to a poet who has a world-wide reputation, and adds its measure of admiration to the many that have been bestowed upon him by his fatherland".

The members of the Swedish Academy voted unanimously for Carducci, a rare occasion by the Academy. The decision to award Carducci is considered one of the least controversial in the history of the Nobel Prize in Literature. He was the first and remain one of the few laureates who got all of the delivered votes from the members of the Swedish Academy.

== Award ceremony ==
At the award ceremony in Stockholm on 10 December 1906, Carl David af Wirsén, permanent secretary of the Swedish Academy said:

Carducci is a learned literary historian who has been nurtured by ancient literature and by Dante and Petrarch. But he cannot be easily classified. He is not devoted to romanticism, but rather to the classical ideal and Petrarchan humanism. Regardless of the criticism which can justly be launched against him, the irrefutable truth remains that a poet who is always moved by patriotism and a love of liberty, who never sacrifices his opinions to gain favour, and who never indulges in base sensualism, is a soul inspired by the highest ideals.

And insofar as his poetry in the aesthetic sense attains a rare force, Carducci can be considered worthy in the highest degree of the Nobel Prize in Literature.

The Swedish Academy thus pays respect to a poet who already enjoys a world-wide reputation, and adds its homage of admiration to the many praises already given him by his country.

Due to Carducci's declining health, he was not able to receive the prize personally in Stockholm. Instead, the Swedish ambassador in Italy received it on his behalf.
