= Diccionario biográfico de Chile =

The Diccionario biográfico de Chile por Pedro Pablo Figueroa is a national dictionary of Chilean biography. It was compiled in Spanish by Pedro Pablo Figueroa. The 4th edition was published in 1901 in 3 volumes.
