= Copley (crater) =

Crater on Mercury

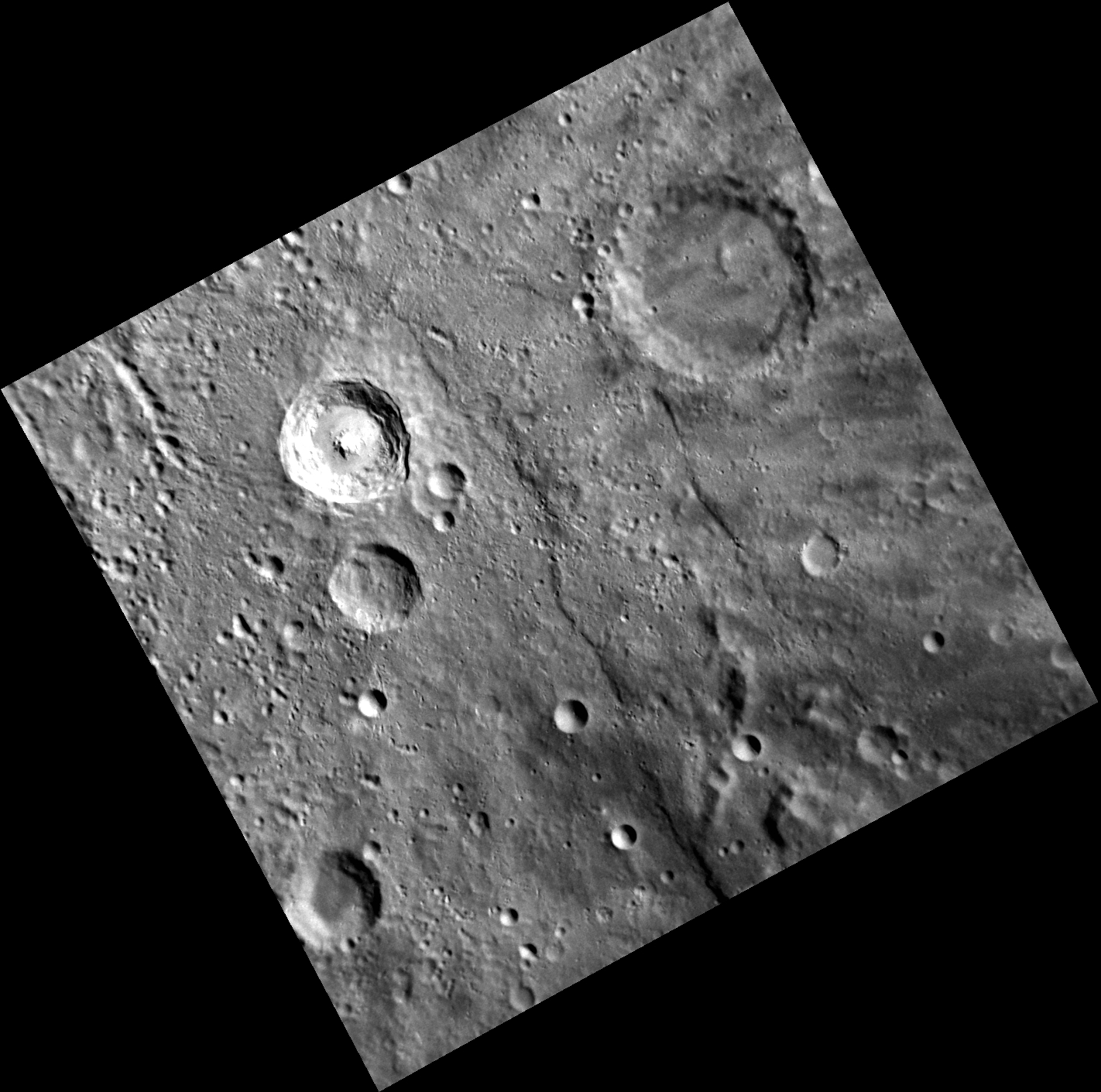
- MESSENGER image, with Copley left of center
- Feature type: Impact crater
- Location: Discovery quadrangle, Mercury
- Coordinates: 38.4°S 85.2°W
- Diameter: 34 km (21 mi)
- Eponym: John Singleton Copley

Copley is a crater on Mercury. It has a diameter of 34 kilometers. Its name was adopted by the International Astronomical Union (IAU) in 1976. Copley is named for the American painter John Singleton Copley, who lived from 1738 to 1815.

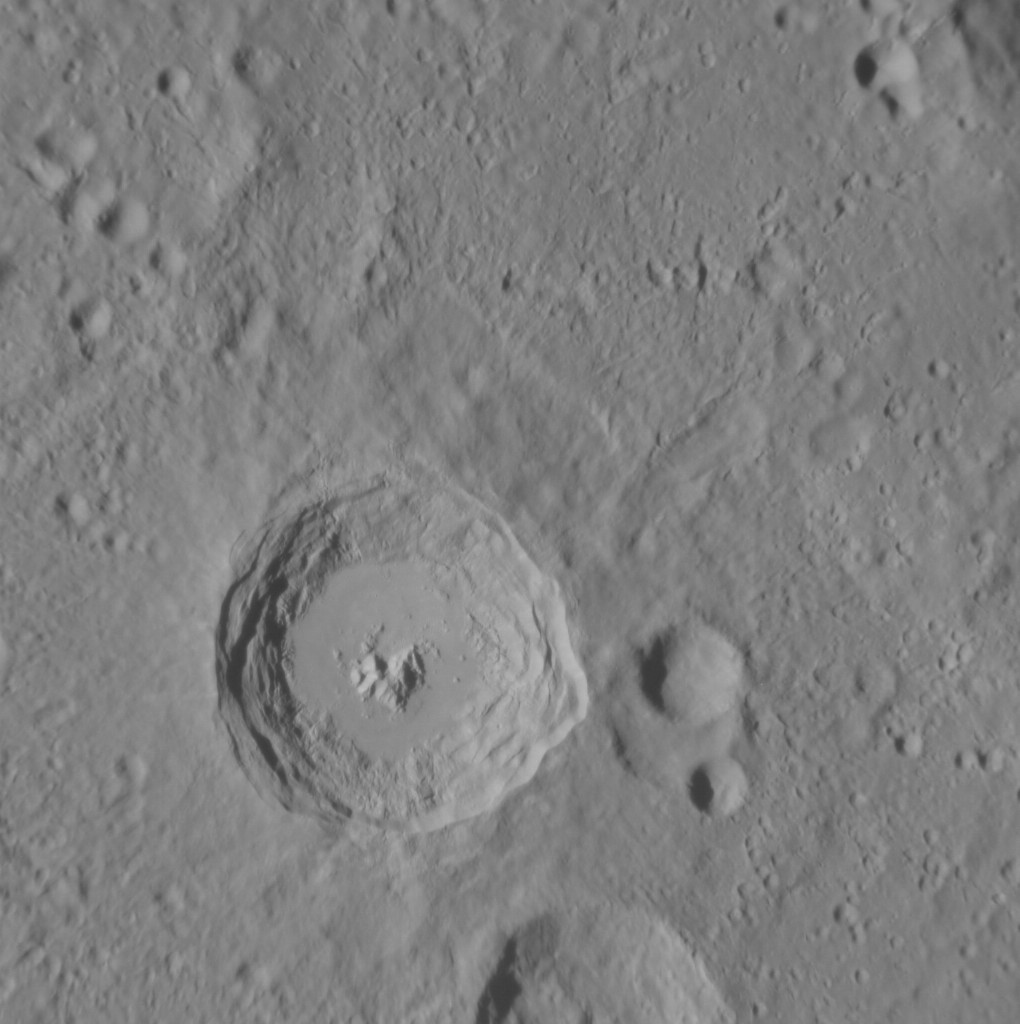
Copley crater detail

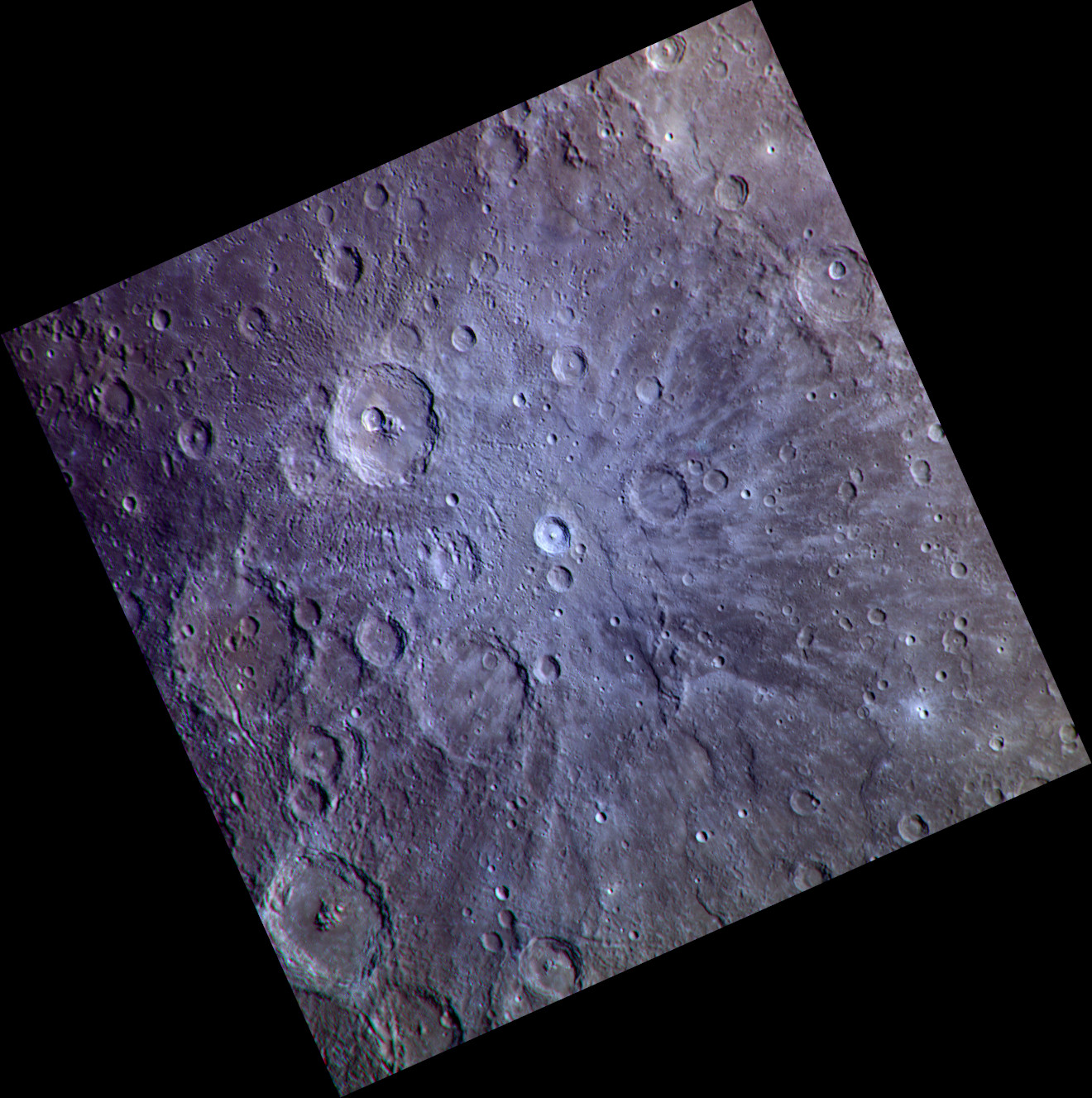
Copley crater region in exaggerated color

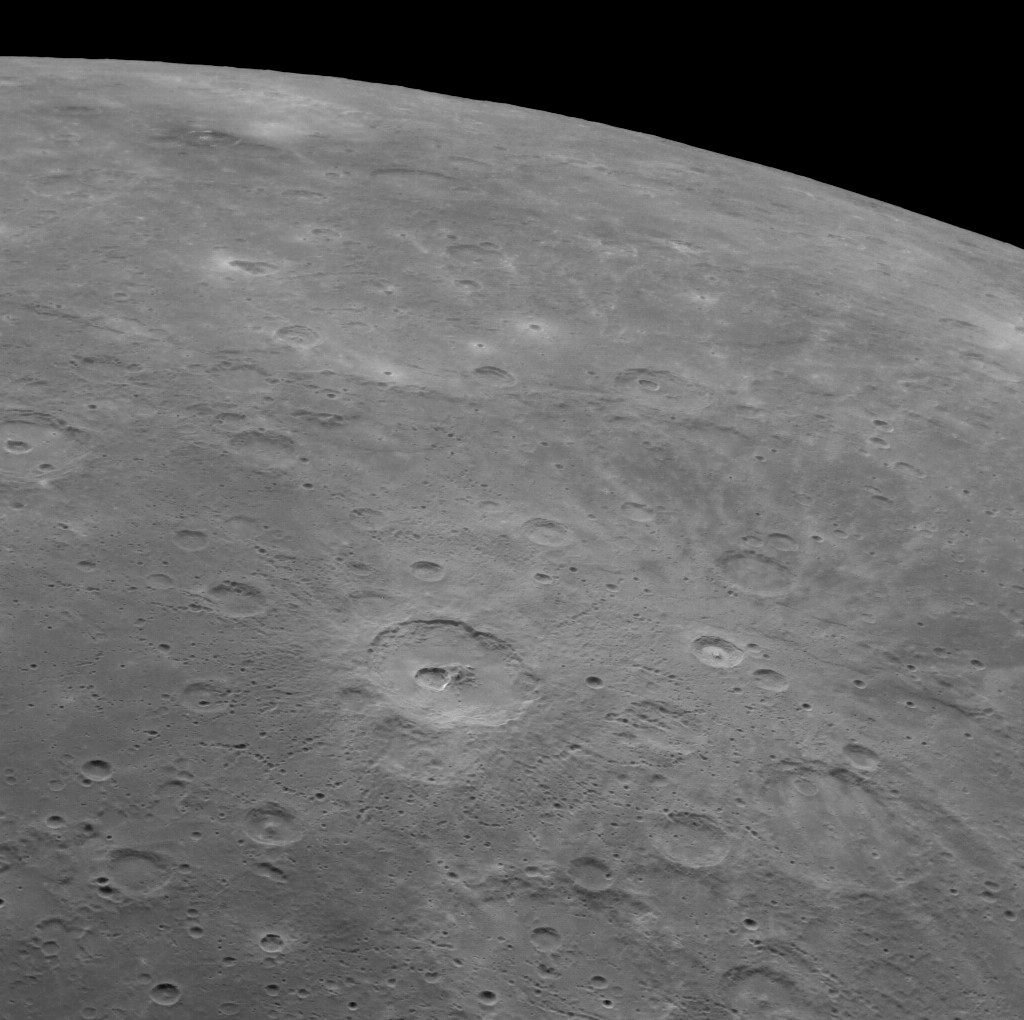
Oblique view of Carducci crater (below center) and Copley with bright rays
