= Museum of the Risorgimento, Bologna =

Museum in Italy

Coordinates: 44.4882°N 11.3574°E

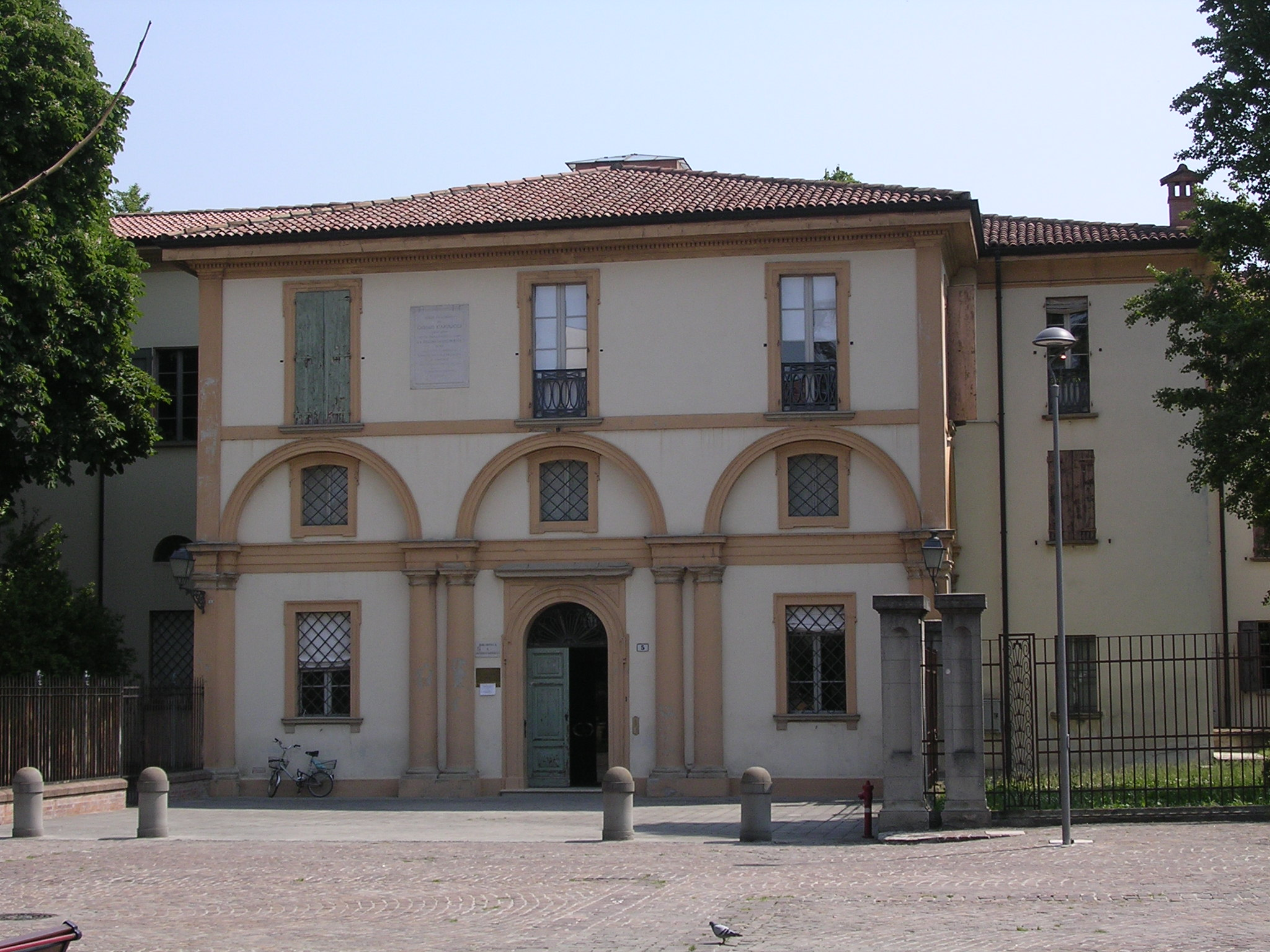
Carducci House, Bologna

The Civic Museum of the Risorgimento is located in the ground floor of the Casa Carducci, located in Piazza Carducci 5, in central Bologna, Italy.

== Church of Madonna del Piombo ==
Prior to being a Museum, part of the site had housed the church of the Madonna della Pietà, known commonly as the Madonna del Piombo (Virgin Mary of the Lead). It was so named because it contained a relief of the Madonna etched on a lead plate, attributed to Sperandio Savelli, that had gained veneration. There is also a legend that in the first years of the 16th century the icon had been discovered by youths playing here, near the city walls, and this led to the first chapel, then church.

This church burned down in 1712, but was soon replaced by a frescoed oratory completed in 1752. This oratory whose facade is represented by the three round arches with double central pilasters. After the Napoleonic occupation, the members of the company who owned the oratory had the structure deconsecrated and the contents sold off to antiquarians. The oratory had been decorated by the artists Antonio Rossi, Ercole Graziani the Younger, Gaetano Ferratini, Giuseppe Orsoni, Antonio Gionima, and Lorenzo Garbieri.

== The Museum ==
A Bolognese Museum of the Risorgimento (see Italian unification) was first inaugurated on June 12, 1893. The museum has exhibits that chronicle the history from the Napoleonic invasions to the end of the First World War. The main exhibits are divided into 5 eras:

- The Napoleonic Era (1796-1814)
- The Restoration of Papal States (1815-1848)
- The Epic of the Risorgimento (1848-1860)
- The Unification of Italy (1860-1914)
- Bologna at War (1915-1918)

The Museum houses a library of documents and an archive of diverse items from the period. It houses the a project towards maintenance of the city's monumental cemetery at the Certosa di Bologna.

The museum has varied in scope and themes across the decades. The initial founding of the museum focused on the patriotic events leading to Italian sovereignty and union. During and after the First World War, this conflict was defined as the Fourth War of Independence. Fascism added to the focus, the ideals of a greater Italy, the aggressive colonial wars that led to the formation of Italian East Africa, the Italian intervention in the Spanish Civil War, and the Second World War. The museum first closed in 1943, and did not reopen until 1954. Fascist wars and goals were now removed as a focus, and the Resistance to Fascism was viewed as the Second Risorgimento. The museum closed again from 1962 to 1975, and now focuses on the history prior to the Italy's entry into World War II.

The museum was located in the present Casa Carducci premises only in 1990, and includes the premises of the oratory. The Casa Carducci was the last home of the poet Giosuè Carducci, who was awarded the Nobel Prize in literature in 1906.
