= Giosuè Carducci =

Italian poet and teacher (1835–1907)

Giosuè Carducci OCI OSML
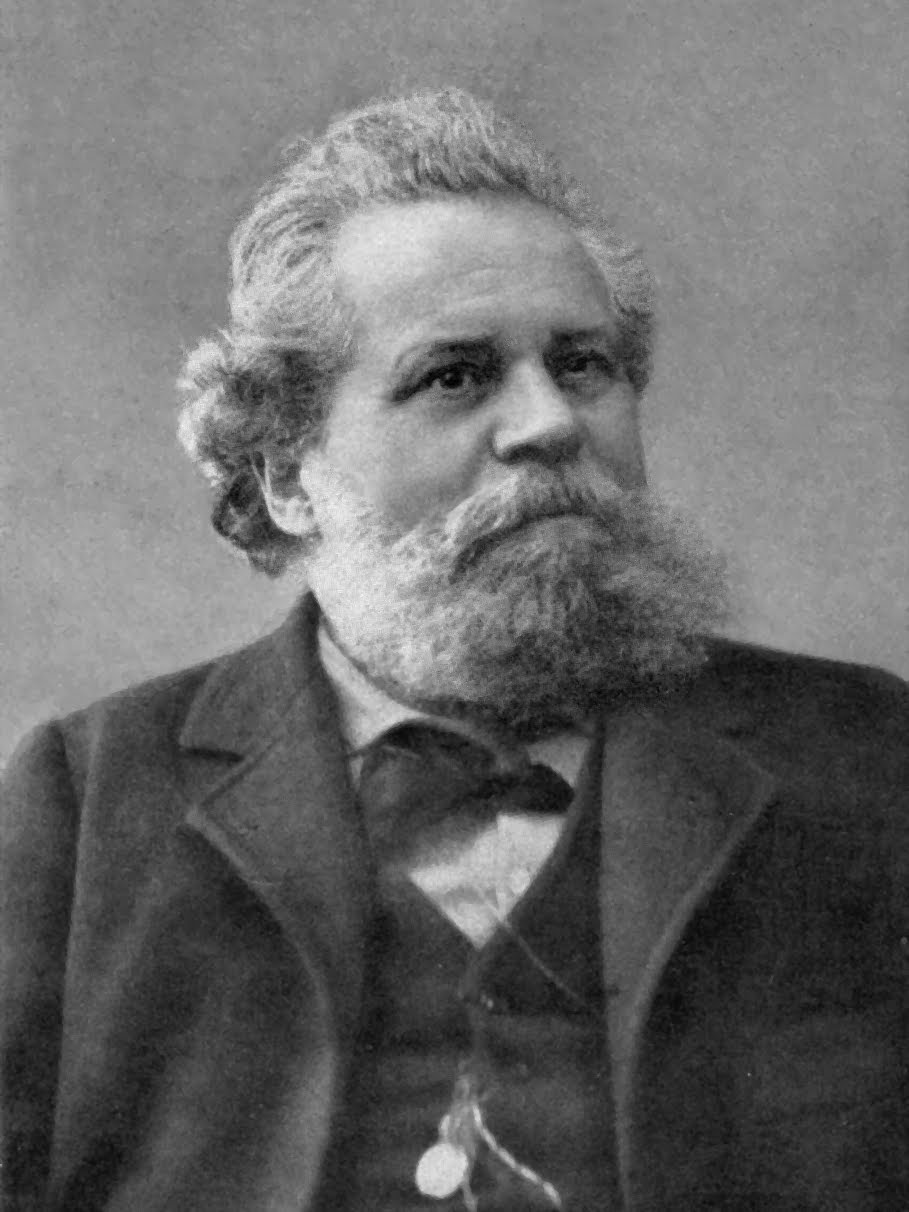
- Carducci c. 1900
- Born: Giosuè Alessandro Giuseppe Carducci; 27 July 1835; Valdicastello di Pietrasanta, Grand Duchy of Tuscany
- Died: 16 February 1907 (aged 71); Bologna, Kingdom of Italy
- Resting place: Certosa di Bologna, Bologna
- Education: Scuola Normale Superiore di Pisa
- Occupations: Poet; literary critic; academic
- Spouse: Elvira Menicucci (m. 1859)
- Parents: Michele Carducci (father); Ildegonda Celli (mother)
- Writing career
- Notable work: Barbarian Odes
- Notable awards: Nobel Prize in Literature; 1906
- Movement: Neoclassicism

Senator of the Kingdom of Italy
- In office 4 December 1890 – 16 February 1907
- Monarch: Umberto I

Signature
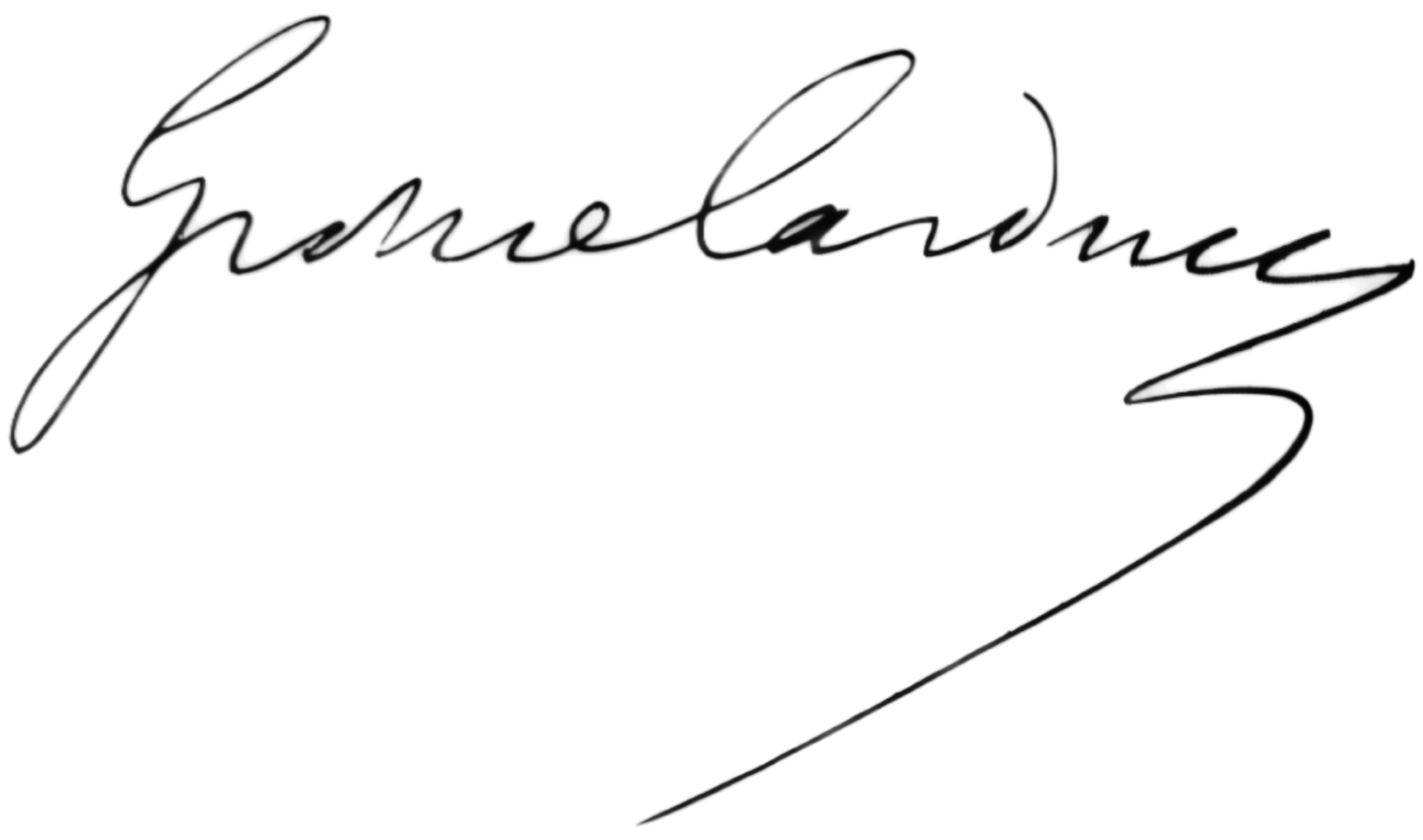

Giosuè Alessandro Giuseppe Carducci (Note: English: /kɑːrˈduːtʃi/ kar-DOO-chee; Italian: [dʒozuˈɛ kkarˈduttʃi]; also spelled Giosue Carducci (Italian pronunciation: [ˈdʒɔːzu.e karˈduttʃi]) in later years.) (27 July 1835 – 16 February 1907) was an Italian poet, writer, literary critic, and teacher. He was noticeably influential, and was regarded as the official national poet of modern Italy. In 1906, he became the first Italian to receive the Nobel Prize in Literature. The Swedish Academy awarded him the prize "not only in consideration of his deep learning and critical research, but above all as a tribute to the creative energy, freshness of style, and lyrical force which characterize his poetic masterpieces."

== Biography ==
=== Early life and education ===
Giosuè Carducci was born in Valdicastello in Pietrasanta, a small town currently part of the Province of Lucca in the northwest corner of Tuscany, which at the time was an independent grand duchy. His father, Michele, was a country doctor and an advocate of the unification of Italy. A member of the Carboneria, in his youth he had suffered imprisonment for his share in the revolution of 1831. Because of his politics, the family was forced to move several times during Carducci's childhood, eventually settling for a few years in Florence.

Carducci's father attempted to impart to his son his own fervent enthusiasm for the writings of Manzoni, but Carducci never acquired a taste for Romanticism. The boy was also taught Latin by his father and delighted in the works of Virgil and other ancient authors. He avidly read books on the history of Rome and anything dealing with the French Revolution. He wrote his first poems when he was still a boy, in 1846.

After the failure of the revolution of 1848, the Carducci family was obliged to move. The threat of violence became too great for Carducci's father, and the family relocated first to Lajatico, then to Florence.

Carducci went to religious schools until 1852, and was influenced by his rhetoric teacher, the Piarist Father Geremia Barsottini, who had translated into Italian prose all the odes or Horace. The boy became fascinated with the restrained style of Greek and Roman Antiquity, and translated Book 9 of Homer's Iliad into Italian. In these years Carducci became further impassioned in the cause of Italian unification and discovered the works of Ugo Foscolo and Giuseppe Mazzini. After completing his education, Carducci followed his wandering father to Celle sul Rigo on Monte Amiata, but soon after won a scholarship to the prestigious Scuola Normale Superiore di Pisa.

=== Early works ===
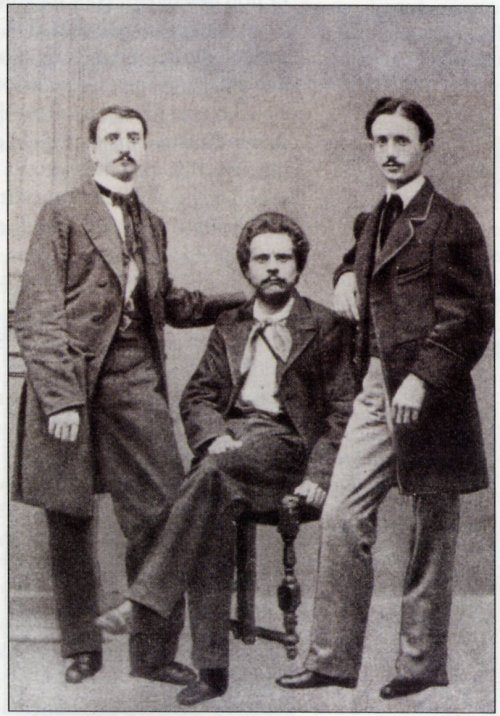
Giosuè Carducci (seated) with his friends Giuseppe Torquato Gargani and Giuseppe Chiarini, c. 1855

In 1855, Carducci published his first work, L'arpa del popolo, an anthology of Italian poetry for use in schools, and a year later he received his doctorate and a certification for teaching. He took a position as a rhetoric teacher in a secondary school at the gymnasium in San Miniato, Pisa.

In this period Carducci began working on his first major collection of poems. The collection was published in six books in 1871 under the title of Juvenilia. Carducci's early verses exhibit the strong influence of classical models, of the stilnovisti, of Dante and Petrarch and, among the moderns, Alfieri, Monti, Foscolo and Leopardi. But the Carduccian spirit is already visible; his love for the beauty of style, the purity of sentiments and the celebration of liberty, as well as the ability to appreciate all that is genuine, therefore also the language of the common people.

With several friends, among them Giuseppe Chiarini and Torquato Gargani, Carducci founded a literary society, Amici Pedanti, a group that was essentially anti-Romantic and anti-Catholic. They believed that ltaly's only hope for the future was in the revival of the classical, pagan spirit of the ancient world, which was emphasized as still existing in the Italian land and blood. Such opinions naturally provoked violent objections, both from Romantics and from those who favored the status quo, Carducci freely and ferociously responded in prose to the attacks many times. His first collection of poetry, Rime, appeared in July 1857.

Although Carducci won a competition for the Chair of Greek in a secondary school in Arezzo, his political opinions and his father's political record as a revolutionary caused the granducal government to deny him the appointment. Carducci was forced to return to Florence, where he eked out a living by giving private lessons. In November, his depression became worse when his brother Dante killed himself for unknown reasons. After the death of his father (1858), Carducci was compelled to take care of his family, whose affairs were in disarray. He moved with his mother and brother into a very poor house in Florence, continuing his private lessons. He also began to collaborate with the publisher Gaspero Barbera; together they founded a short-lived literary magazine, Il Poliziano. Despite his financial situation, Carducci married Elvira Menicucci in March, 1859.

=== Italian unification ===
Hymn to Satan

To thee of All Being
The First Cause immense
Of matter and spirit
Of reason and sense

Whilst in the full goblet
Shall sparkle the wine,
So bright the pupil
The souls of men shine,

Whilst earth still is smiling,
And the sun smiles above,
And men are exchanging
Their sweet words of love,

Thrills mystic of Hymen
Through high mountains course,
And broad plains are heaving
With life's fertile force,

On thee in verse daring,
From tight rein released,
On thee I call, Satan,
The King of the feast.

— From "Hymn to Satan" poem by Giosuè Carducci

On April 27 of that year, the Grand Duchy was dissolved and Tuscany joined the newly formed Kingdom of Italy. Carducci's fortunes began to turn for the better. First, he was offered the Chair of Greek in the secondary school of Pistoia, where he remained for nearly a year; then, the Minister of Public Education, Terenzio Mamiani della Rovere, appointed him to the Chair of Italian Eloquence at the University of Bologna. Carducci soon became a popular lecturer. He was somewhat ambivalent toward his professorial role and its traditional philological orientation and fretted about its effect on his poetry, but the position allowed him to deepen his acquaintance with the classics and with the literature of other nations. His political views also changed. Under Victor Emmanuel II, Carducci had been an idealistic monarchist in support of the union of Italy, but after Garibaldi was wounded and captured by Italian troops in the battle of Aspromonte in 1862, Carducci allied himself with the democratic republicans and became more pronouncedly Jacobin and anticlerical, venting his intense feelings in aggressive poetry.

His anti-clerical revolutionary vehemence was prominently showcased in one famous poem, the deliberately blasphemous and provocative "Inno a Satana" ("Hymn to Satan"). "Satan" / "Lucifer" was considered by Italian leftists of the time as a metaphor for the rebellious and freethinking spirit. The poem was composed in 1863 as a dinner party toast, published in 1865, and then republished in 1869 by Bologna's radical newspaper, Il Popolo, as a provocation timed to coincide with the First Vatican Council, a time when revolutionary fervour directed against the papacy was running high as republicans pressed both politically and militarily for an end to the Vatican's domination over the Papal States. In 1866 Carducci was initiated at the Masonic lodge "Galvani" of Bologna.

=== Literary fame ===
While "Inno a Satana" had quite a revolutionary impact, Carducci's finest poetry came in later years. He published his Giambi (iambics; later Giambi ed epodi), a collection of polemical poems, under the pseudonym "Enotrio Romano"; the poems reveal Carducci's affinities with Victor Hugo and Heinrich Heine. By 1872, Carducci had begun to control his polemical instincts, and some of his finest poems, later collected in The New Lyrics, were written in the 1870s. Barbarian Odes, begun in 1873, are considered his most influential work, and contain some of his most celebrated poems.

In the Barbarian Odes Carducci endeavored to imitate ancient classical stanza forms, such as the Alcaic and the Sapphic. Since they were based on stress and not on syllabic quantity, he believed they would have sounded ‘barbaric’ to classical poets: hence the title of the collection.

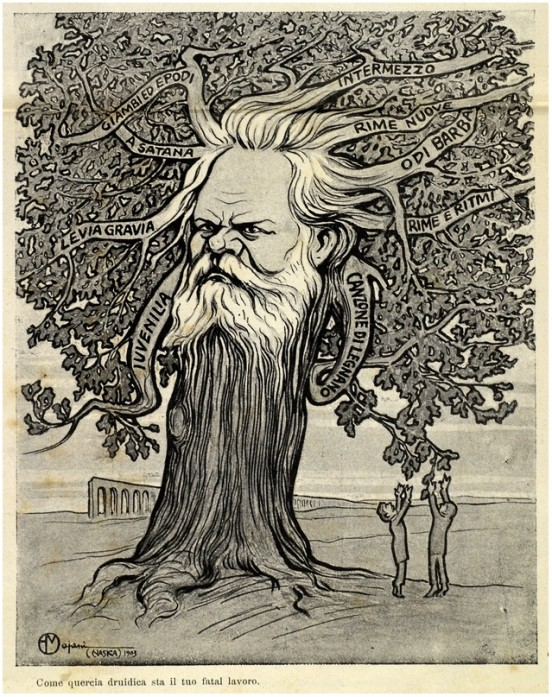
Caricature of Giusuè Carducci by Augusto Majani: the poet's head is at the top of the tree trunk with beard blended into the trunk and hair blended into the tree limbs. Several titles of his works are inscribed on limbs. Two people stand together, beneath the crown of the tree, stretching to touch or grasp the lowest branches

Following the publication of the Barbarian Odes, Carducci became an object of adulation for the younger generation of Italian poets. Periodicals such as Fanfulla della domenica, Cronaca Bizantina, and Domenica letteraria helped spread his fame. New Barbarian Odes solidified his reputation, and he assumed the role of national poet.

The 1880s were for Carducci a period of intense literary activity. In 1881 he began to write for Cronaca Bizantina, a flamboyant and very successful literary journal that numbered among its contributors the likes of Giovanni Marradi, Matilde Serao, Edoardo Scarfoglio, Guido Magnoni, and Gabriele D'Annunzio. Within the next few years he published the three admirable volumes of his Confessioni e Battaglie (1882), the Ça Ira sonnets (1883), and a considerable number of articles, pamphlets and essays.

His lyrical production progressed in these years of work; for the Canzone di Legnano, the Odes to Rome and to Monte Mario, the Elegy on the urn of Percy Bysshe Shelley, the ringing rhymes of the Intermezzo, in which he blended the satire of Heine with the lyrical form of his native poetry – all belong to this period.

In the Late 19th century Carducci's political and philosophical views shifted; he resigned himself to constitutional monarchy and acquired a more religious attitude, with some appreciation of the Church's mission, though he remained fundamentally anticlerical.

=== Later life and international success ===
The last two decades of Carducci's life were filled with misery. In 1885, he became ill. Five years later he was made a senator by the King of Italy, but in 1899, a stroke paralyzed his hand and nearly deprived him of speech. He continued working, despite the setbacks, publishing his last volume of poetry, Rime e ritmi (Rhymes and Rhythms), in 1899 and collecting his works from 1850 to 1900. In 1904, he resigned from teaching. His disciple Giovanni Pascoli replaced him as professor of Italian literature at the University of Bologna.

In 1906, Carducci became the first Italian to receive the Nobel Prize in Literature. He died the following year in Bologna, at the age of 71. His funeral, celebrated in San Petronio, was followed by a procession through the streets of the city attended by a large crowd. He is buried in the Certosa di Bologna. A monument in his honor was erected in Bologna between 1908 and 1926 to a design by Leonardo Bistolfi.

== Religious views ==
In his youth Carducci was an atheist, whose political views were vehemently hostile to the Catholic Church. In the course of his life, his views on religion shifted towards a socially oriented theism which he exposed in his famous "Discorso sulla libertà perpetua di San Marino" ("A Speech on San Marino's Perpetual Freedom"), pronounced on 30 September 1894 before the authorities and people of that ancient Republic and celebrating "the Universal God of Peoples, Mazzini's and Washington's God". According to some sources Carducci was reconciled to the Catholic Church in 1895. On 11 September 1978, Pope John Paul I mentioned him as a "model" for university professors and teachers of Latin.

== Legacy ==
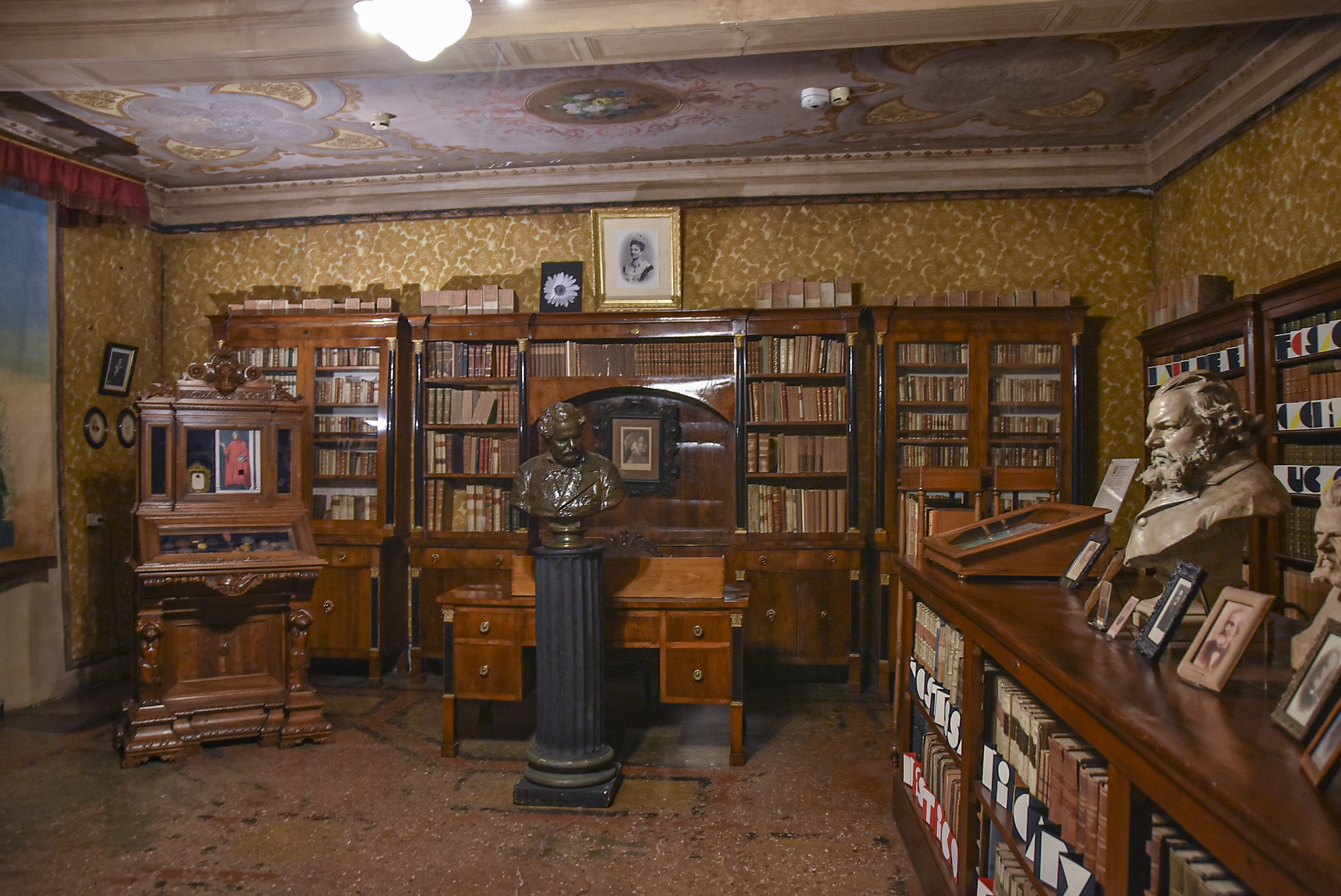
The library of Casa Carducci

Carducci dominated the Italian literary scene in the last thirty or forty years of the 19th century. He is considered one of the greatest lyric poets of modern Italy. Carducci's works are exceptional in their synthesis of literary qualities often seen as opposites. Though his life coincided with the height of Romanticism in Italy, he took the classical mode as his paradigm of artistic creation. This might have made him a curious anachronism, but his passion and his agility with classical form kept his works free of the servility that mars much neoclassical poetry. In the Rime nuove Carducci proves a skilful reworker of medieval themes in poems such as 'Il comune rustico', 'Sui campi di Marengo', and 'Faida di comune' (as also in La canzone di Legnano of 1879); whilst he achieves remarkable blends of neoclassical and Romantic motifs in 'Primavere elleniche' and pure moments of autobiographical lyricism in 'Idillio maremmano', 'Pianto antico', and 'Davanti a San Guido'. Of the Odi barbare 'Alla stazione in una mattina d'autunno', which culminates in the image of the steam engine carrying his beloved away from him like a fiery Moloch, is one of the most impressive Italian poems of all time. The Museum of the Risorgimento, Bologna is housed in the Casa Carducci, the house where he died, and contains an exhibit on the author. Carducci's influence has been far-reaching. His poems have been translated into English several times. According to Frederick John Snell, "English poetry, especially as incarnate in Swinburne, is signally indebted to Carducci". The crater Carducci on Mercury is named in his honor.

== Works ==
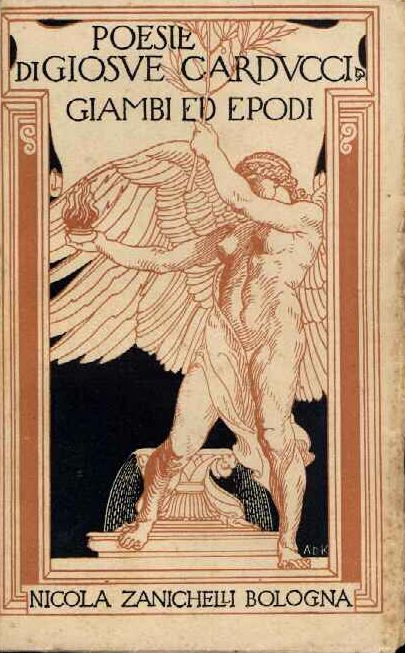
Carducci's Giambi ed Epodi, Bologna, Zanichelli, 1921

It is not always easy to follow the development of Carducci's poetry through the collections he edited. The poet in fact organized his compositions several times and in different ways and gave a definitive arrangement only later in the edition of his Opere published for Zanichelli between 1889 and 1909. The following is a list of poetic works published in one volume, then rearranged into the 20 volumes of his Opere.

- Rime, San Miniato, 1857.
- Levia Gravia, 1868.
- Poesie, Firenze, Barbera, 1871.
- Primavere elleniche, 1872.
- Nuove poesie, 1873.
- Odi barbare, 1877.
- Juvenilia, 1880.
- Levia Gravia, 1881.
- Giambi ed Epodi, 1882.
- Nuove odi barbare, 1882.
- Rime nuove, 1887.
- Terze odi barbare, 1889.
- Delle Odi barbare. Libri II ordinati e corretti, 1893.
- Rime e ritmi, 1899.
- Poesie. MDCCCL-MCM, 1901.

Below are the poetic volumes in the Opere. The volumes, however, do not correspond to the chronological order with which the poet had published his first collections, but refer more than anything else to the distinctions of genres and therefore we find poems of the same period in different collections. The collections follow this order:

- Juvenilia, in six books, 1850–1860
- Levia Gravia, in two books, 1861–1871
- Inno a Satana, 1863
- Giambi ed Epodi, in two books, 1867–1879
- Intermezzo, 1874–1887
- Rime Nuove, in nine books, 1861–1887
- Odi barbare, in two books, 1873–1889
- Rime e Ritmi, 1889–1898
- Della Canzone di Legnano, Part I, 1879

Although his reputation rests primarily on his poetry, Carducci also produced a large body of prose works. Indeed, his prose writings, including literary criticism, biographies, speeches and essays, fill some 20 volumes. Carducci's best critical works are his ample commentary on the works of Parini, his essay on Dante's Rime, his defense of Tasso's Aminta, and his study of the early works of Foscolo. Carducci edited several editions of Italian classical authors, including Petrarch, Lorenzo de' Medici, Poliziano and Salvator Rosa. He was also an important translator of German poetry into Italian, in particular of Heine and Goethe.

== See also ==
- Jessie White Mario

== Sources ==
- "Nobel Prize Presentation Speech". www.nobelprize.org. 1906.
- Muret, Maurice (1907). "Le poète Giosuè Carducci". Revue des deux Mondes. 40 (1): 103–32. JSTOR 44803840.
- Chisholm, Hugh, ed. (1911). "Carducci, Giosuè" . Encyclopædia Britannica. Vol. 5 (11th ed.). Cambridge University Press.
- Carducci. A selection of his poems, with verse translations, notes, and three introductory essays. Translated by Geoffrey Langdale Bickersteth. London: Longman. 1913.
- Mazzoni, Guido (1930). "CARDUCCI, Giosuè". Enciclopedia Italiana. Rome: Istituto dell'Enciclopedia Italiana.
- Giuntoni, Julius (1931). "The Reaction of Giosuè Carducci to Romanticism". Italica. 8 (1): 9–12. doi:10.2307/475894. JSTOR 475894.
- Schifalacqua, G. B. (1940). "La Révolution Française Dans Les Chants de Giosuè Carducci". Annales Historiques de la Révolution Française. 17 (100): 218–33. JSTOR 41925077.
- Hazelton Haight, Elizabeth (1949). "Giosuè Carducci, the Italian Horace". Studies in Philology. 46 (3): 387–99. JSTOR 4172893.
- "Giosuè Carducci". Cyclopedia of world authors. Vol. 1. New York: Harper & Brothers. 1958. pp. 181–183.
- Wellek, René (1960). "Italian Criticism after De Sanctis". Italian Quarterly. 4: 30–54.
- Salinari, Giambattista (1969). "Giosuè Carducci". In E. Cecchi; N. Sapegno (eds.). Storia della Letteratura Italiana. Vol. VIII: dall'Ottocento al Novecento. Milan: Garzanti. pp. 625–729.
- Groves, David (2000). "Carducci, Giosuè". Encyclopedia of Literary Translation Into English. Vol. 1: A-L. London and Chicago: Taylor & Francis. pp. 230–232. ISBN 978-1-884964-36-7.
- Arapaia, Paul (2002). "Constructing a National Identity from a Created Literary Past: Giosuè Carducci and the Development of a National Literature". Journal of Modern Italian Studies. 7 (2): 192–214. doi:10.1080/13545710210137947.
- Carsaniga, Giovanni (2002). "Carducci, Giosuè". The Oxford Companion to Italian Literature. Oxford: Oxford University Press.
