= Carducci (crater) =

Crater on Mercury

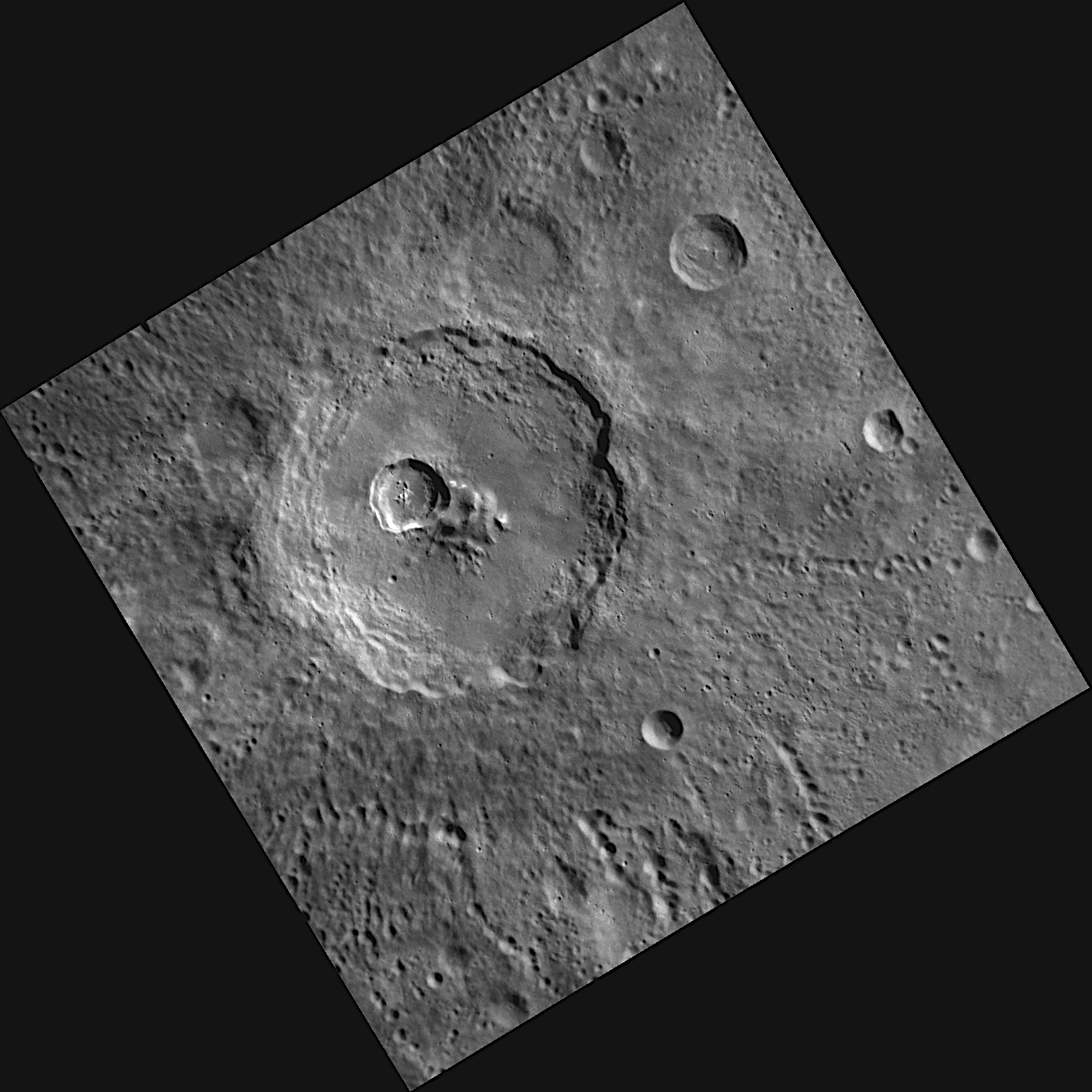
- MESSENGER image of Carducci
- Feature type: Impact crater
- Location: Discovery quadrangle, Mercury
- Coordinates: 36.6°S 89.9°W
- Diameter: 108.19 km (67.23 mi)
- Eponym: Giosue Carducci

Carducci is a crater on Mercury. It has a diameter of 108.19 kilometers. Its name was adopted by the International Astronomical Union (IAU) in 1976. Carducci is named for the Italian poet Giosuè Carducci, who lived from 1835 to 1907.

An unnamed crater of about 20 km (12 mi) diameter has obliterated the western portion of Carducci's central peak complex.

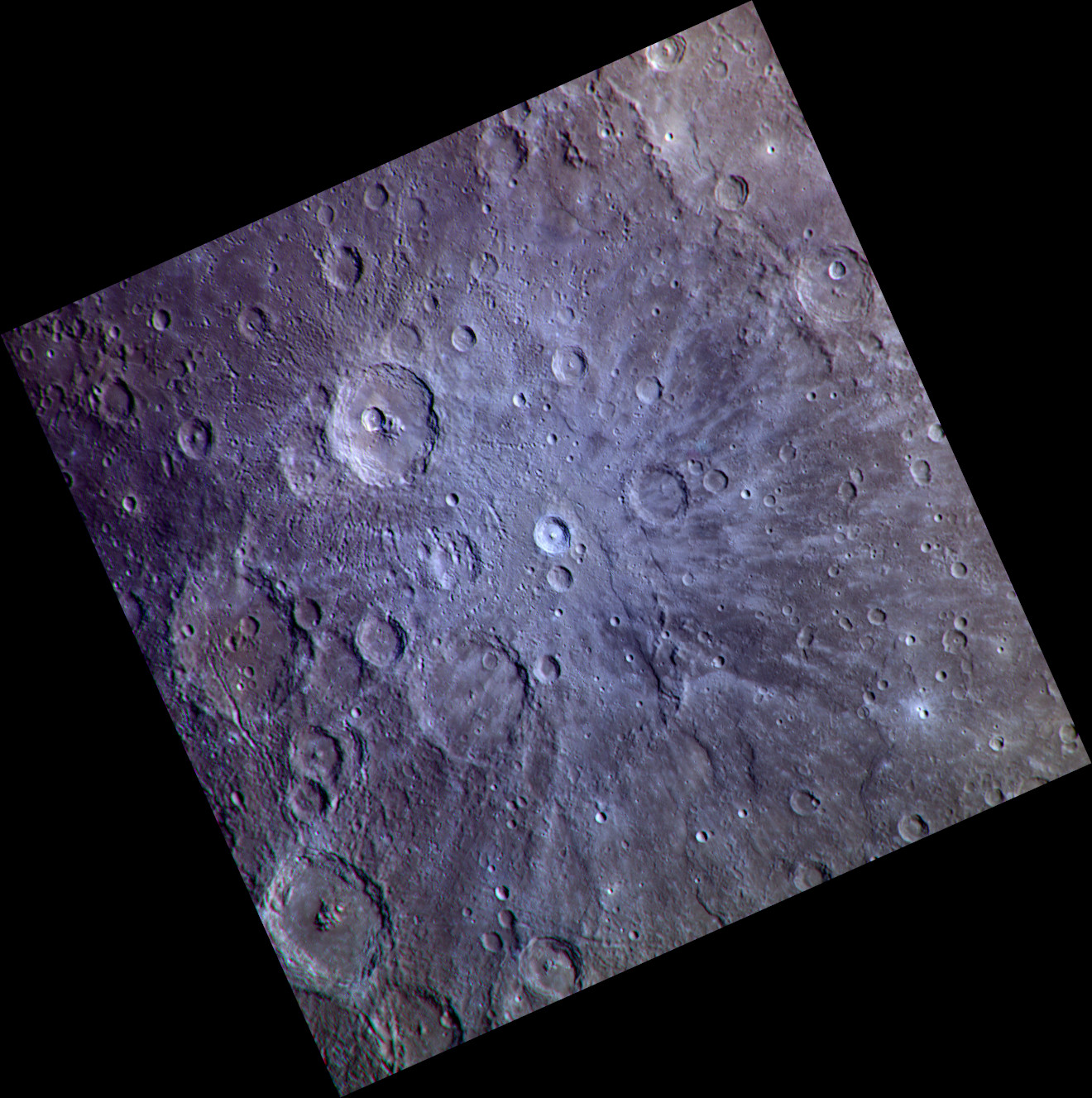
Carducci crater region in exaggerated color

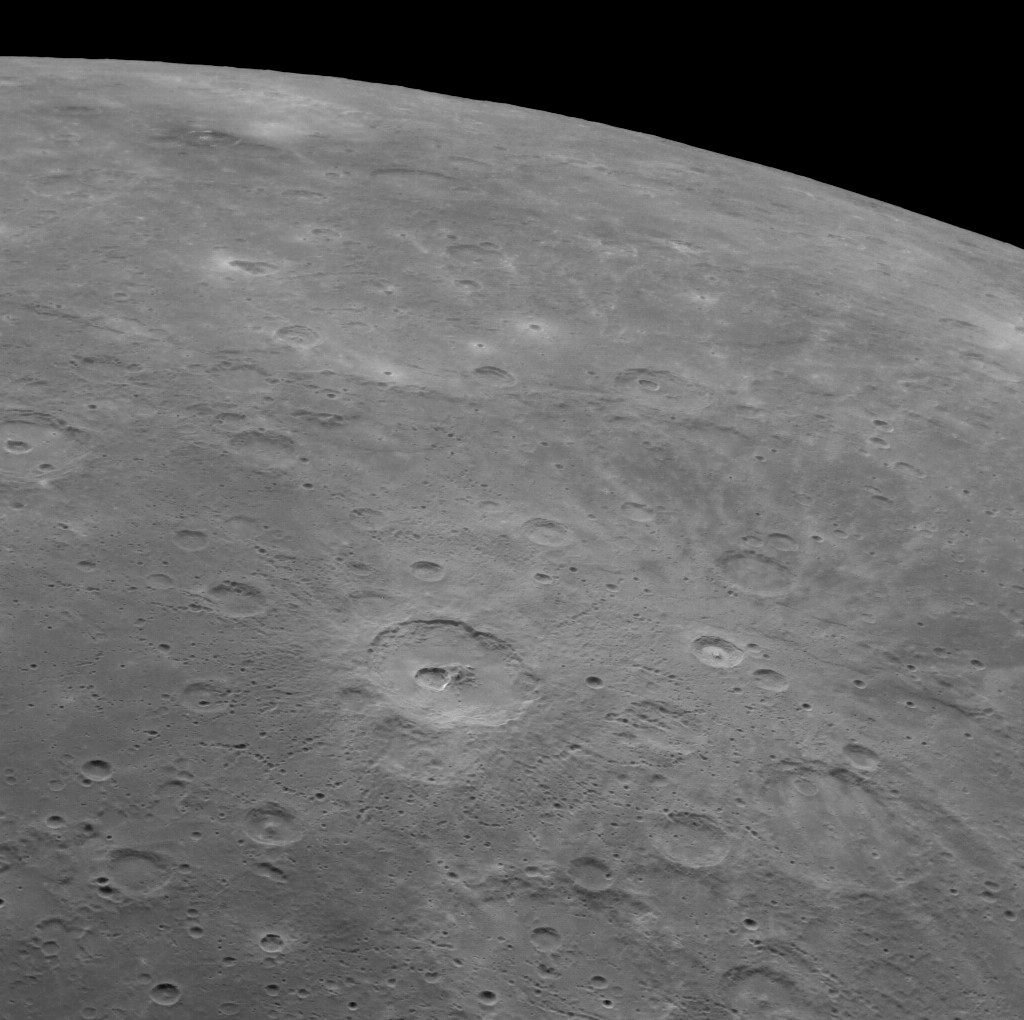
Oblique view of Carducci crater (below center) and Copley crater with bright rays
