= Barbarian Odes =

Italian poetry collection by Giosuè Carducci

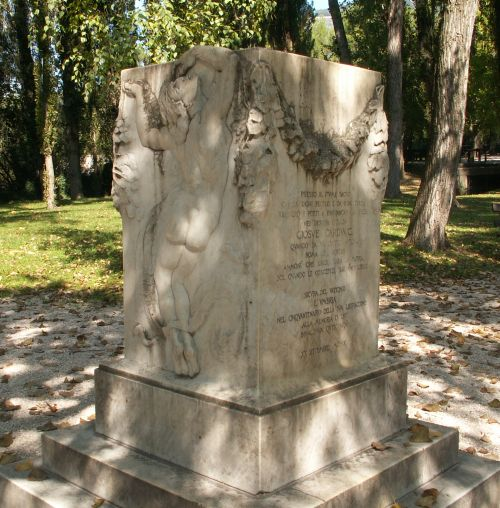
A monument to Carducci at the headwaters of the Clitunno, inspiration for one of the Barbarian Odes

Barbarian Odes (Italian: Odi barbare) is a collection of three books of poetry by Giosuè Carducci, published between 1877 and 1889.

== Overview ==
Together, the three books of Barbarian Odes contain 56 poems. Of the adjectives available in English—"barbarian," "barbaric," and "barbarous"—to translate the Italian barbaro (barbare is the feminine plural form in Italian), "barbarian" is the choice of most English translators, including the Nobel Prize committee in its 1906 literature award to Carducci. The word, here, is to be understood not in the negative sense of something savage, but simply as a reference to the Classical and pre-Christian setting of the ancient world of the Greeks and Romans, a reference that is a constant in Carducci's poetry. Prominent translators such as William Fletcher Smith also use the term "barbarian".

The Nobel prize award speech says of the Barbarian Odes that "… Carducci's full lyrical maturity and accomplished stylistic beauty appear…" and that "… Carducci's genius has never reached greater heights than in some of his Odi barbare." Carducci was a patriot and committed to the aspirations of the Risorgimento, the 19th-century movement to unify Italy; thus, there are in the Barbarian Odes poems in praise of Garibaldi and queen Margherita. Most of the poems, however, are Classical in theme and even in style, as Carducci often uses forms and meter imitative of Latin poets such as Horace and Virgil.

An example from the Barbarian Odes and perhaps the one most familiar to Italians, in general, and Italian school children, in particular, is entitled Le fonti del Clitumno ("The Head-waters of the Clitumnus"), a description of that spot in the hills of Umbria where the Clitunno River has its beginning. Carducci wrote the ode between July and October 1876. It is generally considered one of Carducci's highest evocations of the Classical world, combining pastoral purity and nostalgia for the glories of ancient Italy. The first seven verses in Italian are:

Ancor dal monte, che di foschi ondeggia
frassini al vento mormoranti e lunge
per l’aure odora fresco di silvestri
salvie e di timi,

scendon nel vespero umido, o Clitumno,
a te le greggi: a te l’umbro fanciullo
la riluttante pecora ne l’onda
immerge, mentre

ver’ lui dal seno del madre adusta,
che scalza siede al casolare e canta,
una poppante volgesi e dal viso
tondo sorride:

pensoso il padre, di caprine pelli
l’anche ravvolto come i fauni antichi,
regge il dipinto plaustro e la forza
de’ bei giovenchi,

de’ bei giovenchi dal quadrato petto,
erti su ‘l capo le lunate corna,
dolci ne gli occhi, nivei, che il mite
Virgilio amava.

Oscure intanto fumano le nubi
su l’Appennino: grande, austera, verde
da le montagne digradanti in cerchio
L’Umbrïa guarda.

Salve, Umbria verde, e tu del puro fonte
nume Clitumno! Sento in cuor l’antica
patria e aleggiarmi su l’accesa fronte
gl’itali iddii.

The last verse cited above is particularly famous and has become proverbial in modern Italy. An accurate prose translation of the above is:

The flocks still come down to you, o Clitumnus, from the far mountains that move with the murmur of breeze-swept ash groves and fresh scent of sage and thyme in the damps of evening. The young Umbrian shepherd immerses his reluctant sheep in your waters. By a farmhouse a barefoot mother sits and sings, nursing her child, who looks to the shepherd and smiles. The pensive father with goatish hair, at his painted cart, turns on his hips like the beasts of old, with the strength of a young bull, like those square of breast, erect and crowned by crescent horns, sweet in their eyes and snow-white, much beloved by gentle Virgil. The darkening clouds hang like smoke on the Apennines: grand, austere and green from the spreading mountains, Umbria watches. Hail, green Umbria, and you the fount of god Clitumnus. I feel in my heart the ancient home, my fevered brow touched by the olden gods of Italy.

(translation: J. Matthews)
