= George Lansing Raymond =

American philosopher (1839–1929)

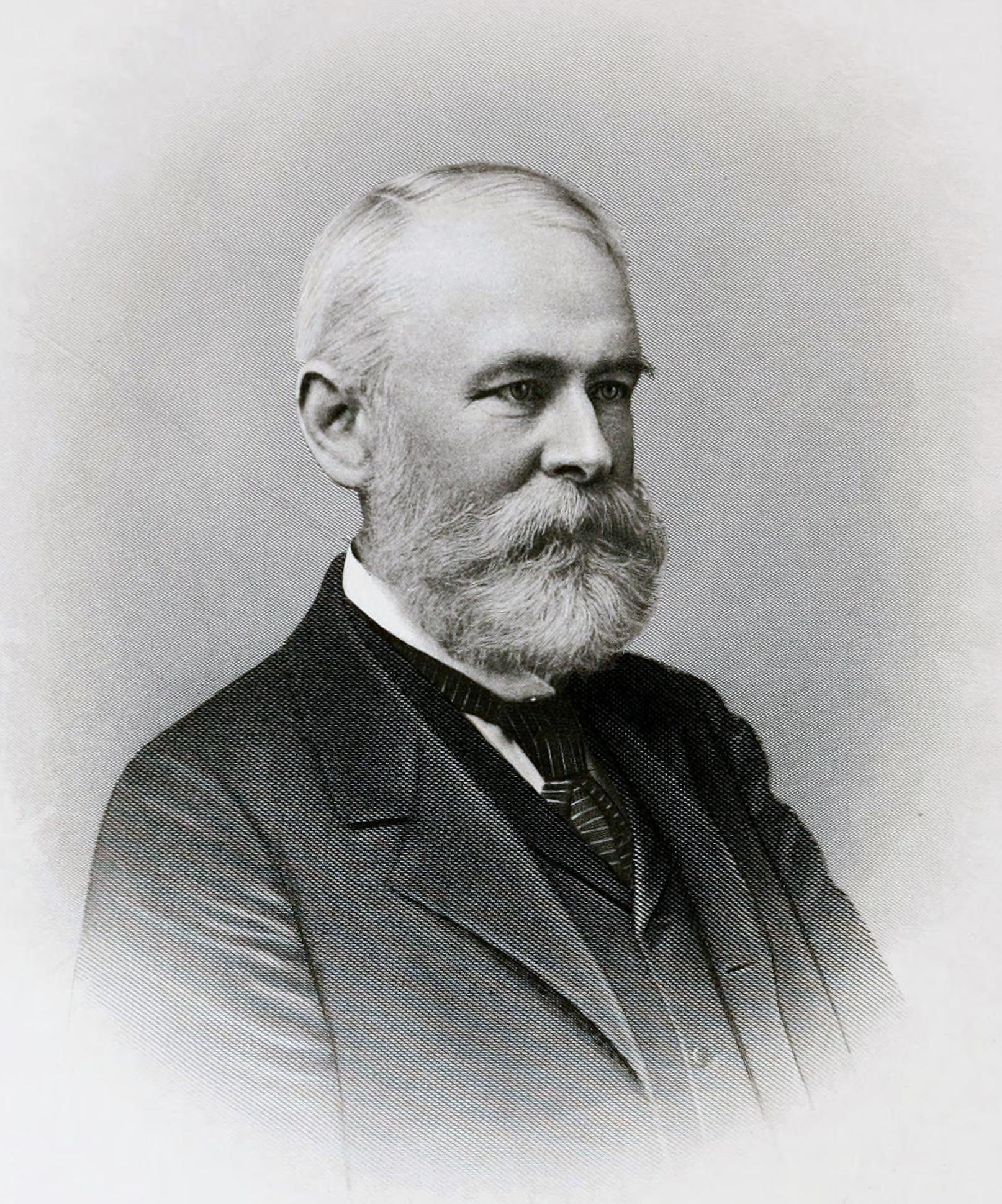
- Born: September 3, 1839; Chicago, Illinois
- Died: July 11, 1929 (aged 89); Washington, D.C.
- Resting place: Princeton Cemetery
- Education: Phillips Academy; Williams College; Princeton Theological Seminary
- Occupations: Professor and author

Signature
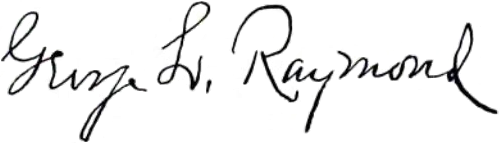

George Lansing Raymond (September 11, 1839–July 11, 1929) was a prominent professor of Aesthetic Criticism at Princeton University from 1881 to 1905, and author of a new system of aesthetics. He was nominated for the Nobel Prize in Literature seven times.

He also served as a professor at George Washington University (D.C.) and Williams College (his alma mater).

== Personal life ==
Raymond was born in Chicago on September 3, 1839, the son of Benjamin Wright Raymond, twice Mayor of Chicago. He was educated at Phillips Academy, Andover, graduating in 1858, Williams College, where he was a member of the Kappa Alpha Society, and Princeton Theological Seminary.

He married Mary Elizabeth Blake on July 31, 1872, and they had one child.

Raymond died at Garfield Hospital in Washington, D.C., on July 11, 1929.

== Career ==
Raymond was the author of a systematic theory of art published by G.P. Putnam, published in seven volumes during the period 1886 to 1900, and republished as a set of uniform volumes in 1909. An eighth volume was published as a summary of the seven volumes, titled, Essentials of Esthetics. A volume of excerpts of his seven books, edited by the classical scholar Marion Mills Miller, was also published by Putnam in 1920.

Raymond was an art theorist who created the first comprehensive and systematic theory of the arts. The New York Times said "In a spirit at once scientific and that of the true artist, he pierces through the manifestations of art to their sources, and shows the relations, intimate and essential, between painting, sculpture, poetry, music, and architecture."

He was rare among art theorists of the time (and since), to use psychology and physiology and biological factors to ground his art theory, and to use detailed discussions of specific art works to validate his views.

Although his work is neglected, some scholars say his system deserves resurrection.

His basic approach is as stated in his summary one-volume book Essentials of Esthetics:

The phenomena of the arts of the highest class have been traced [in this book] to their sources in material nature and in the human mind; the different arts have been shown to be developed by exactly similar methods; and these methods have been shown to characterize the entire work of artistic imagination, from the formulation of psychical concepts to that of their most physical expressions in rhythm, proportion and harmony.

He was also a vocal advocate of a scientific and rational Christianity. He seemed to be following in Aquinas' footsteps in believing he could rationalize religious belief with science.

He was also a widely published poet during the latter part of the 19th century, though with no lasting celebrity.

He wrote works on oratory (i.e., rhetoric), early in life, since he was a professor of oratory; and later in life after retiring from his professorships, he wrote a book on ethics and natural law.

== Works on aesthetics ==
All works are published by G.P. Putnam's Sons, New York.

- 1886 – Poetry as a Representative Art (reissued 1909)
- 1893 – Genesis of Art Form (reissued 1909)
- 1894 – Art in Theory (reissued 1909)
- 1894 – Rhythm and Harmony in Poetry and Music; Music as a Representative Art (reissued 1909)
- 1895 – Painting, Sculpture and Architecture as Representative Arts (reissued 1909)
- 1899 – Proportion and Harmony of Line and Color in Painting, Sculpture and Architecture (reissued 1909)
- 1900 – Representative Significance of Form (reissued 1909)
- 1906 – Essentials of Aesthetics (reissued 1909 and 1921) Summary textbook of first seven volumes
- 1920 – An Art Philosopher's Cabinets (reissued 1926?) edited by Marion Mills Miller

== See also ==
- American philosophy
- List of American philosophers
