= Marie-Louis-Antoine-Gaston Boissier =

French classical scholar (1823-1908)

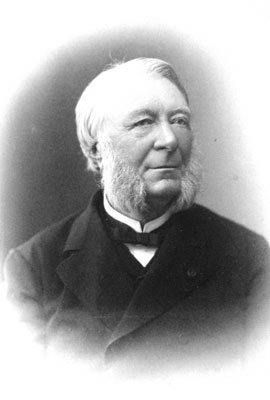
- Gaston Boissier
- Born: 15 August 1823; Nîmes
- Died: 20 November 1908 (aged 85)
- Occupation: classical scholar

Marie-Louis-Antoine-Gaston Boissier (15 August 1823 – 20 November 1908), French classical scholar, and secretary of the Académie française, was born at Nîmes.

The Roman monuments of his native town very early attracted Gaston Boissier to the study of ancient history. He made epigraphy his particular theme, and at the age of twenty-three became a professor of rhetoric at the University of Angoulême, where he lived and worked for ten years without further ambition. A travelling inspector of the university, however, happened to hear him lecture, and Boissier was called to Paris to be professor at the Lycée Charlemagne.

He began his literary career by a thesis on the poet Attius (1857) and a study on the life and work of Marcus Terentius Varro (1861). In 1861 he was made professor of Latin oratory at the Collège de France, and he became an active contributor to the Revue des deux mondes. In 1865 he published Cicéron et ses amis (Eng. trans. by AD Jones, 1897), which has enjoyed a success such as rarely falls to the lot of a work of erudition. In studying the manners of ancient Rome, Boissier had learned to re-create its society and to reproduce its characteristics with exquisite vivacity.

In 1874 he published La Religion romaine d'Auguste aux Antonins (2 vols.), in which he analysed the great religious movement of antiquity that preceded the acceptance of Christianity. In L'Opposition sous les Césars (1875) he drew a remarkable picture of the political decadence of Rome under the early successors of Augustus. By this time Boissier had drawn to himself the universal respect of scholars and men of letters, and on the death of HJG Patin, the author of Études sur les tragiques grecs, in 1876, he was elected a member of the Académie française, of which he was appointed perpetual secretary in 1895.

His later works include Promenades archéologiques: Rome et Pompei (1880; second series, 1886); L'Afrique romaine, promenades archéologiques (1901); La Fin du paganisme (2 vols, 1891); La Conjuration de Catilina (1905); Tacite (1903, Eng, trans. by WG Hutchison, 1906). He was a representative example of the French talent for lucidity and elegance applied with entire seriousness to weighty matters of literature. Though he devoted himself mainly to his great theme, the reconstruction of the elements of Roman society, he also wrote monographs on Madame de Sévigné (1887) and Saint-Simon (1892). He died in June 1908.

== Main works ==
- Le Poète Attius, étude sur la tragédie latine pendant la République (1857)
- Étude sur la vie et les ouvrages de Marcus Terentius Varro (1861)
- La religion romaine, d'Auguste aux Antonins (1874)
- L'Opposition sous les Césars (1875)
- Promenades archéologiques : Rome et Pompéi (1880)
- Cicéron et ses amis. Étude sur la société romaine du temps de César (1884)
- Nouvelles promenades archéologiques : Horace et Virgile (1886). Chapitre premier, La Maison de campagne d’Horace, sur wikisource.
- Madame de Sévigné (1887)
- L'Afrique romaine. Promenades archéologiques en Algérie et en Tunisie] (1895)
- La Conjuration de Catilina (1905)
- La fin du paganisme : étude sur les dernières luttes religieuses en Occident au quatrième siècle (1891)
- Louis de Rouvroy, duc de Saint-Simon (1899)
- Tacite (1903)

== Bibliography ==
- Velay, Serge; Boissard, Michel; Bernié-Boissard, Catherine (2009). Petit dictionnaire des écrivains du Gard (in French). Nîmes: Alcide. pp. 41–42. ISBN 978-2-917743-07-2. Archived from the original on 2015-07-23.
