= Pedro Pablo Figueroa =

Chilean writer (1857–1909)

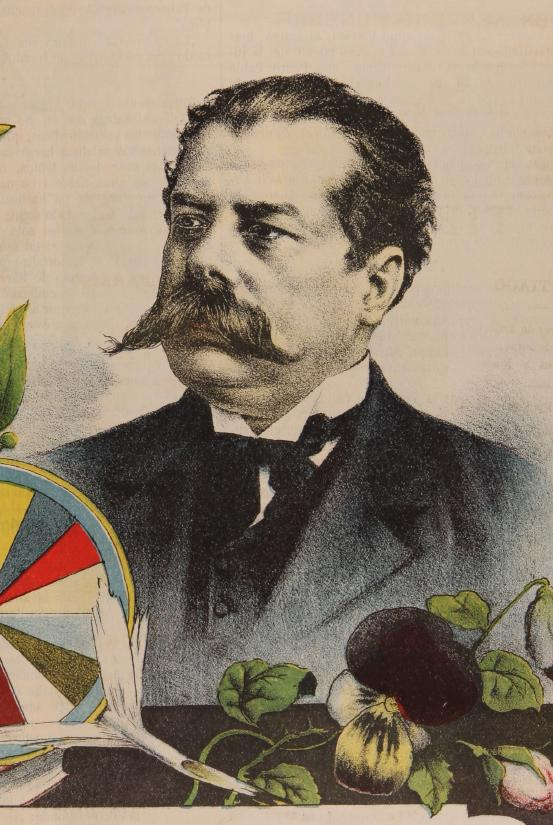
Pedro Pablo Figueroa Luna

Pedro Pablo Figueroa Luna (December 25, 1857 in Copiapó, Chile – January 4, 1909 in Santiago) was a Chilean writer and researcher. Among his works is the Diccionario biográfico de Chile, first published in 1887.

== Bibliography ==
- Biografía de don Benjamín Vicuña Mackenna (1884)
- Tradiciones y leyendas (1885)
- Apuntes históricos (1885)
- Galería de escritores chilenos (1885)
- La sombra del genio (1885)
- Diccionario biográfico de Chile (1887)
- Estudios históricos Sudamericanos (1890)
- Diccionario biográfico de extranjeros 1890)
- Los principios del liberalismo democrático (1893)
- Vida del general José Francisco Vergara Gana (1894)
- La librería de Chile (1894)
- Reseña histórica de la literatura chilena (1900)
- Album Militar (1903)
- Rómulo Mandiola, su vida y sus escritos inéditos (1903)
- Historia de la fundación del carbón de piedra (1908)
- Biografía de don Jorge Rojas Miranda (1908)
- Antología chilena (1908)
